= The Adventures of Champion =

The Adventures of Champion may refer to:

- The Adventures of Champion (TV series), a children's television series aired on CBS
- The Adventures of Champion (radio series), a western serial radio drama
