= The Adventures of Champion (radio series) =

- Genre: Juvenile adventure serial
- Running time: 15 minutes
- Country of origin: United States
- Language(s): English
- Syndicates: Mutual
- TV adaptations: The Adventures of Champion
- Directed by: William Burch
- Original release: June 20, 1949 – November 1949

The Adventures of Champion is an American Western serial radio drama directed by William Burch about screen cowboy Gene Autry's horse Champion. Each 15-minute episode was broadcast weekday afternoons on the Mutual Broadcasting System in 1949 and 1950. (Another source says that the program ran "June to November 1949.")

== Background ==
The radio series was a spin-off from Gene Autry's Melody Ranch, a 1940-1956 CBS radio network Sunday-afternoon program featuring the singing cowboy. Jack French and David S. Siegel, in their book Radio Rides the Range: A Reference Guide to Western Drama on the Air, 1929-1967, opined: "The Adventures of Champion was not a spin-off of [Autry's] popular radio show, Melody Ranch, even though both programs had the efforts of the same people. Just grasping the basic scenario of The Adventures of Champion required a substantial suspension of belief in what its juvenile listeners knew to be gospel. Champion was Autry's horse and had a major role in all of his movies, television programs, and personal appearances."

== Format ==
Episodes focus on 12-year-old Ricky West, who is raised in the wilderness by his adoptive Uncle Smoky and his German Shepherd named Rebel. Champion is depicted as a wild horse who lets only Ricky ride him. While the series covered gold mines, rustlers, and Indian problems, the primary focus was on the faith and loyalty between a boy, a dog, and a horse. Stories ran in five installments each, beginning on Monday and ending on Friday.

== Cast ==
Little is known about the cast of the program. French and Siegel wrote, "One of the most curious mysteries about this series was who played the leads of Ricky and Uncle Smoky; contemporary accounts of the program have been unsuccessful in unearthing their identities, and the vast Autry Library and Research Services in Los Angeles, CA, has no record of who the performers were." One participant who was identified was Dave Light, an animal imitator who provided sounds of all animals on the program.

== Television adaption ==
A television series called The Adventures of Champion aired for 26 episodes on CBS during the 1955–1956 season and starred Barry Curtis and Jim Bannon.

== See also ==
- The Adventures of Champion (TV series)
- Gene Autry's Melody Ranch
