= Run for the Roses =

Run for the Roses may refer to:

- "The Run for the Roses," a nickname for the Kentucky Derby
- Run for the Roses (film), a 1977 film directed by Henry Levin
- "Run for the Roses" (song), a 1980 song by Dan Fogelberg, included on the 1981 album The Innocent Age
- Run for the Roses (album), a 1982 album by Jerry Garcia
  - "Run for the Roses", a song by Jerry Garcia and Robert Hunter, from the album of the same name
