= The Treasure Seekers =

The Treasure Seekers may refer to:

- The Story of the Treasure Seekers, an 1899 novel by E. Nesbit
- The Treasure Seekers (TV series), a 1961 British TV series, based on the novel by E. Nesbit
- The Treasure Seekers (1979 film), directed by Henry Levin
- The Treasure Seekers (1996 film), a made-for-TV movie, based on the novel by E. Nesbit
