= Henry Levin (director) =

American film director (1909–1980)

- Born: June 5, 1909; Trenton, New Jersey, U.S.
- Died: May 1, 1980 (aged 70); Glendale, California, U.S.
- Occupations: Director, actor

Henry Levin (5 June 1909 – 1 May 1980) was an American film director. He directed over 50 feature films between 1944 and 1980, with his best known works including Jolson Sings Again (1949), Journey to the Center of the Earth (1959) and Where the Boys Are (1960). He has been described as "a true Hollywood journeyman."

== Early life ==
Levin grew up in Trenton, New Jersey, where his parents Sam and Mary Leevin ran a theatrical boarding house. Levin had three brothers. He attended high school in Trenton and then went to Pennsylvania University, graduating with a degree in economics. "I was a song and dance kid and an actor," recalled Levin, playing in family burlesque, vaudeville and many benefit amateur productions."

Levin went to work as a Wall Street trader in June 1929, but that career ended after Wall Street's crash. For the next three years Levin lived in Trenton, working in real estate, while acting and directing little theatre productions in his spare time.

=== Theatre actor and director ===
In 1936 Levin moved to East Hampton where he worked with the student stock company in the John Drew Theatre at the Rollins School of acting. He appeared in Prelude to Exile in 1936. In the summers of 1937, 1938 and 1930 Levin directed at the Rollins School. In the winters he was assistant stage manager for a number of New York Theatre Guild productions.

From 1940-41 he acted and stage mangaed for Brock Pemberton stage productions.

He was on Broadway in Somewhere in France (1941) and appeared in summer stock in Cuckoos on the Hearth (1941). In 1942 he tried to enlist in the army but was rejected; he then moved to Los Angeles.

== Directing ==
=== Columbia ===
In December 1942 it was announced Levin signed a contract with Columbia to direct a low budget Western, but the project never materialized. By May 1943 it was announced Levin had been signed to work at Columbia Pictures as a dialogue director. He was one of three stage directors recruited by the studio – the others were William Castle and Leslie Urbach. Levin's job was to work with the younger Columbia actors. In April Levin was assigned to work as dialogue director on The Clock Struck Twelve (later titled Passport to Suez) with Warren William, one of the Lone Wolf films. He later went on to be dialogue director on Dangerous Blondes (1943), Appointment in Berlin (1943) and Two Man Submarine (1944). Levin later said he worked for sixteen months as a dialogue director.

Levin was then promoted to director along with several other "potentials" who began as dialogue directors: Fred Sears, William Castle, Mel Ferrer and Robert Gordon. His first film as director was Cry of the Werewolf (1944) with Nina Foch. He followed it with Sergeant Mike (1944) with Larry Parks and Dancing in Manhattan (1944) with Ann Savage, who had worked with Levin as a dialogue director and paid tribute to his "quiet and unassuming manner" which "would soon quiet my nerves."

Levin directed a documentary The Negro Sailor (1945) and the film I Love a Mystery (1945), based on the radio show. Levin directed a swashbuckler The Fighting Guardsman (1945) and was called in to do some work on The Bandit of Sherwood Forest (1946), a Robin Hood movie thas originally directed by George Sherman, and was hugely popular.

He directed Night Editor (1946), another based on a radio show, and two sequels to I Love a Mystery, The Devil's Mask (1946) and The Unknown (1946). Levin did another swashbuckler, The Return of Monte Cristo (1946). Levin's next credit was the drama The Guilt of Janet Ames (1947), replacing Charles Vidor during filming.

By now Levin was one of Columbia's leading directors, making The Corpse Came C.O.D. (1948), a comedy; The Gallant Blade (1948), a swashbuckler with Larry Parks; The Mating of Millie (1948), a comedy with Glenn Ford; and The Man from Colorado (1949) a Western with Ford and William Holden. On Colorado he replaced Vidor again during filming.

Levin helped direct Mr. Soft Touch (1949) with Ford, replacing an ill Gordon Douglas. He had the biggest hit of his career with Jolson Sings Again (1949) starring Parks. He made a romantic comedy And Baby Makes Three (1949) then replaced Vidor another time on a musical with Joan Caulfield, The Petty Girl (1950). In January 1950 Variety reported that Levin was Columbia's most commercially successful director, his three films for the studio released over the prior year earning an aggregated $9.1 million in gross.

Levin was reunited with Ford for Convicted (1950), and The Flying Missile (1950). He did some film noirs, Two of a Kind (1951) and The Family Secret (1951).

=== 20th Century Fox ===
In April 1951 Levin signed an exclusive contract with 20th Century Fox. His first film for them was meant to be Mabel and Me Instead he did Belles on Their Toes (1952); The President's Lady (1952) a biopic of Andrew Jackson with Charlton Heston; The Farmer Takes a Wife (1953) with Betty Grable; Mister Scoutmaster (1953) with Clifton Webb; Three Young Texans (1954), a Western with Jeffrey Hunter; and The Gambler from Natchez (1954) a Western with Dale Robertson. He also did some uncredited work on Way of a Gaucho (1952).

Levin went to England to make The Dark Avenger (1954) with Errol Flynn, a co production between Fox and Allied Artists. In 1956 he was announced for Love Story with Barbara Stanwyck and producer Paul Goldstein but the film was not made. For Allied he made Let's Be Happy (1957).

Back at Fox Levin directed Pat Boone's first film, Bernardine (1957). At Paramount he did a Western with Jack Palance, The Lonely Man (1957), then Fox called him back to do Boone's second film, April Love (1957). During the making of this he said "I see psychological dramas and get depressed. I prefer working with pleasant people."

Levin went to England to do a film for Fox, A Nice Little Bank That Should Be Robbed (1958), then back in Hollywood did two comedies with Clifton Webb, The Remarkable Mr. Pennypacker (1959) and Holiday for Lovers (1959). Webb was also meant to be in Levin's Journey to the Center of the Earth (1959) but fell ill and was replaced by James Mason; Pat Boone co-starred and the film was a huge hit - it is often cited as Levin's best movie.

=== MGM ===
Levin went to MGM where he did Where the Boys Are (1960), an ensemble romantic comedy for producer Joe Pasternak. It was a hit and MGM signed the director to a four-year contract to make one film a year. For the same studio he did The Wonders of Aladdin (1961), produced by Joseph Levine and shot in Tunisia. He then went into The Wonderful World of the Brothers Grimm (1962), an expensive costume picture which he did for George Pal in Cinerama; Pal did the fairy tale sequences and Levin did the Grimm brother scenes.

At Universal, Levin made If a Man Answers (1962) with Sandra Dee and Bobby Darin.

Back at MGM he did the last two pictures on his contract, Come Fly with Me (1963), a Where the Boys Are style comedy about air stewardesses, and Honeymoon Hotel (1964). While making the latter he had been living in Rome for the past three years, and travelling to work.

=== Irving Allen ===
Levin returned to Columbia for Genghis Khan (1965), produced by Irving Allen. Columbia also released Kiss the Girls and Make Them Die (1965) which Levin directed for Dino de Laurentis. Levin was going to do a film about the Danish resistance for Allen, The Savage Canary from a script by John Paxton but it was not made. Instead Levin did two Matt Helm films with Dean Martin for Allen, Murderers' Row (1966) and The Ambushers (1967). During the making of the latter, a newspaper profile was published which claimed Levin's marriage was in trouble. He made a Western for Allen, The Desperados (1969).

=== Later years ===
Levin's later credits included That Man Bolt (1973), Run for the Roses (1977), and The Treasure Seekers (1979). At the end of his career, he finally did some television work, directing some episodes of Knots Landing in 1979 and his last work, the television movie Scout's Honor (1980). Levin died of a heart attack on the last day of filming Scout's Honour.

Despite having been a stage actor, his only screen acting credit was in an episode of the 1974 television series Planet of the Apes.

== Personal life ==
Levin was married to Mildred Cohen (1912 - 1966) Cohen and they had a daughter, Elizabeth (b 1944) and a son David (b 1948). They divorced and she married Maurice Donahue. Levin married Rozann Atlas Gottlieb.

== Theatre credits ==
- The Jazz Singer (Feb 1934)
- Merry Go Round (Oct 1934) - actor, director Tranton
- Gold in the Hills (July 1936) - actor
- Lovers Are Fools (Aug 1936) - actor
- Prelude to Exile (Dec 1936) - actor
- To Quito and Back (Oct 1937) - actor
- Having a Wonderful Time (Dec 1937) - road company, actor
- Glamour Preferred (Oct-Nov 1940) - actor, for Brock Pemberton
- Tovarich (June 1941) - stage manager at Bass Rocks MA, along with Martin Manulis - starred Ramon Navarro
- Two Story House (Jun-Sept 1941) - stage manager for Bass Rocks Theatre, produced by Brock Pemberton, also actor
- Cuckoos on the Heart (Sept 1941) - actor produced by Brock Pemberton

== Filmography ==
=== Dialogue director ===
- Passport to Suez (1943)
- Dangerous Blondes (1943)
- Appointment in Berlin (1943)
- Two Man Submarine (1944)

=== Director ===
- Sergeant Mike (1944)
- Cry of the Werewolf (1944)
- Dancing in Manhattan (1945)
- I Love a Mystery (1945)
- The Negro Sailor (1945)
- The Return of Monte Cristo (1946)
- The Unknown (1946)
- The Devil's Mask (1946)
- Night Editor (1946)
- The Bandit of Sherwood Forest (1946)
- The Fighting Guardsman (1946)
- The Corpse Came C.O.D. (1947)
- The Guilt of Janet Ames (1947)
- The Man from Colorado (1948)
- The Gallant Blade (1948)
- The Mating of Millie (1948)
- And Baby Makes Three (1949)
- Jolson Sings Again (1949)
- Mr. Soft Touch (1949)
- The Flying Missile (1950)
- Convicted (1950)
- The Petty Girl (1950)
- The Family Secret (1951)
- Two of a Kind (1951)
- Belles on Their Toes (1952)
- Mister Scoutmaster (1953)
- The Farmer Takes a Wife (1953)
- The President's Lady (1953)
- The Gambler from Natchez (1954)
- Three Young Texans (1954)
- The Dark Avenger (1955)
- April Love (1957)
- The Lonely Man (1957)
- Bernardine (1957)
- Let's Be Happy (1957)
- A Nice Little Bank That Should Be Robbed (1958)
- Journey to the Center of the Earth (1959)
- Holiday for Lovers (1959)
- The Remarkable Mr. Pennypacker (1959)
- Where the Boys Are (1960)
- Le Meraviglie di Aladino (1961)
- If a Man Answers (1962)
- The Wonderful World of the Brothers Grimm (1962)
- Come Fly with Me (1963)
- Honeymoon Hotel (1964)
- Genghis Khan (1965)
- Kiss the Girls and Make Them Die (1966)
- Murderers' Row (1966)
- Se Tutte le Donne del Mondo (1966)
- The Ambushers (1967)
- The Desperados (1969)
- That Man Bolt (1973)
- Run for the Roses (1977)
- The Treasure Seekers (1979)
- Scout's Honor (1980 TV movie)

== Notes ==
- McClelland, Doug (1987). Blackface to blacklist : Al Jolson, Larry Parks, and The Jolson story. Scarecrow Press.
