= Charles O'Neal =

American dramatist (1904–1996)

- Born: Charles Eldridge O'Neal; January 6, 1904; Raeford, North Carolina, U.S.
- Died: August 29, 1996 (aged 92); Beverly Hills, California, U.S.
- Other name: Blackie O'Neal
- Occupations: Screenwriter; Novelist
- Spouse: Patricia Ruth O'Callaghan (m. 1940)
- Children: 2, including Ryan
- Relatives: Tatum, Griffin and Patrick O'Neal (grandchildren)

Charles Eldridge O'Neal (January 6, 1904 – August 29, 1996) was an American film and television screenwriter and novelist.

== Early life ==
Charles Eldridge "Blackie" O'Neal was born in Raeford, North Carolina, the son of Elizabeth Maude (née Belton) of English descent, and Charles Samuel O'Neal of Irish descent. He attended the University of Iowa, where he played football.

== Career ==
Before acting and writing, O'Neal was a horse groom, telephone repairman and bank clerk. He moved to San Diego, where he joined an acting troupe that included his future wife, Patricia O'Callaghan.

After publishing a short story in Esquire, he decided to forgo performing and turned to screenwriting mostly B-movies, among them The Seventh Victim, Cry of the Werewolf, The Missing Juror, I Love a Mystery, Montana, and Golden Girl. O'Neal's television credits include The 20th Century Fox Hour and The Untouchables.

Together with Abe Burrows, O'Neal adapted his 1949 novel The Three Wishes of Jamie McRuin for the short-lived 1952 musical Three Wishes for Jamie. The production ran on Broadway March 21–June 7, 1952.

O'Neal moved his family around Europe and the Caribbean, writing a newspaper column for Copley Newspapers.

O'Neal is the father of actor Ryan O'Neal and screenwriter/actor Kevin O'Neal and grandfather of Tatum, Griffin, Patrick, Redmond O'Neal. He died in Los Angeles, California, at the age of 92.

== Selected filmography ==
=== Actor ===
- The Hearts of Age (1934)

=== Writer ===
Selected feature film credits are listed in The American Film Institute Catalog of Motion Pictures.

- You're Telling Me (1942, credited as Charles O'Neil)
- The Seventh Victim (1943)
- The Missing Juror (1944)
- Cry of the Werewolf (1944)
- I Love a Mystery (1945)
- The Falcon's Alibi (1946)
- The Unknown (1946)
- The Devil's Mask (1946)
- Something in the Wind (1947)
- Return of the Bad Men (1948)
- Montana (1950)
- Mutiny (1952)
- Golden Girl (1952)
- Vice Squad (1953)
- Johnny Trouble (1957)
- The Alligator People (1959)
- Lassie's Great Adventure (1963)

== Awards ==
O'Neal received the first Christopher Award for his debut novel The Three Wishes of Jamie McRuin (1949).
