= Dancing in Manhattan =

1944 film by Henry Levin

- Directed by: Henry Levin
- Produced by: Wallace MacDonald
- Cinematography: L. William O'Connell
- Edited by: Richard Fantl
- Distributed by: Columbia Pictures
- Release date: 1944
- Country: USA
- Language: English

Dancing in Manhattan is a 1944 American film directed by Henry Levin.

It was originally called Tonight We Dance.

== Plot ==
A garbage truck driver, Eddie Martin (Fred Brady) from Manhattan finds a bag of $5,000 during his rounds. He decides to take his sweetheart, Julie Connors (Jeff Donnell) for a wild night on the town, buying and spending on things they've always wanted, but never thought they would have. Problem 1 is that the money actually belonged to a blackmailing hood named Steve Crawford (William Wright). Problem 2 is when the police start asking uncomfortable questions about why the marked money they hoped to trap Crawford with, is now in the possession of Martin and Connors.

== Cast ==
- Fred Brady as Eddie Martin
- Jeff Donnell as Julie Connors
- William Wright as Steve Crawford
- Ann Savage as Valerie Crawford
- Cy Kendall as Inspector J. J. Kirby
- Carla Balenda as Billie
