= Barton Yarborough =

American actor (1900–1951)

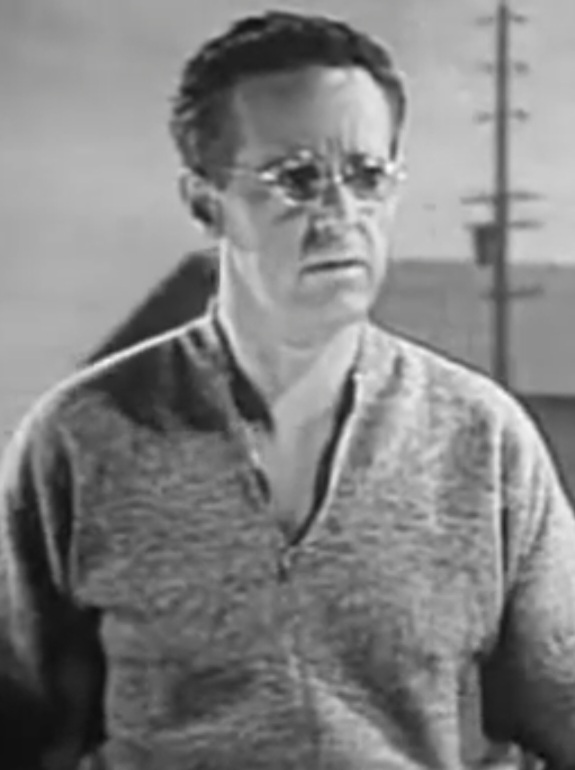
- Yarborough in Let's Go Collegiate (1941)
- Born: William Barton Yarborough; October 2, 1900; Goldthwaite, Texas, U.S.
- Died: December 19, 1951 (aged 51); Burbank, California, U.S.
- Resting place: Forest Lawn Memorial Park, Glendale, California
- Occupation: Actor
- Years active: 1920s–1951
- Spouses: Barbara Jo Allen (m. 1931; div. 1931); Janet Warren (m. 1949)
- Children: 1

William Barton Yarborough (October 2, 1900 – December 19, 1951) was an American actor who worked extensively in radio drama, primarily on the NBC Radio Network. He is famous for his roles in the Carlton E. Morse productions I Love a Mystery, in which he played Doc Long, and One Man's Family, spending 19 years portraying Clifford Barbour. In addition, Yarborough spent three years portraying Sgt. Ben Romero on Jack Webb's Dragnet.

== Early years ==
He was born in Goldthwaite, Texas. As a youth, Yarborough ran away from home, attracted by the vaudeville stages, and he first worked in radio during the 1920s. After joining a touring musical comedy show, he progressed from bit parts to leading man as the troupe played in various places in Oklahoma and Texas. He attended college at the University of Nevada, Reno, and the University of Southern California, where in 1925 he became a member of Phi Sigma Kappa fraternity.

One of Yarborough's earliest reported activities in acting was in November 1922, when he was a member of the cast of a Rebekah and Odd Fellows lodges production of The Prince Chap in Reno, Nevada. He was active in dramatic productions at the University of California, including a one-act play on radio station KLX in 1924. His work on stage at UC ranged from drama (The Frogs) to farce (She Stoops to Conquer).

== Career ==
After graduating from the University of California in 1925, Yarborough acted in London, New York, and California, having the leading-man role in Outward Bound. He was a member of the Eva Le Gallienne Civic Repertoire in New York City. Yarborough's NBC radio debut was in 1930, broadcasting from San Francisco.

In 1932, Yarborough began a long run as Clifford Barbour on the radio serial One Man's Family, continuing in the role throughout his life. Yarborough was probably best known for his roles as Doc Long in the West Coast cast of Carlton E. Morse's I Love a Mystery (and the subsequent I Love Adventure) and Sergeant Ben Romero, Joe Friday's original partner, on Dragnet.

Yarborough's other radio work includes the title role in Hawk Larabee, as well as the roles of Brazos John in Hawk Durango, Sleepy Stevens in Hashknife Hartley, Skip Turner in Adventures by Morse, also by Carlton E. Morse, and the title attorney's assistant in Attorney for the Defense.

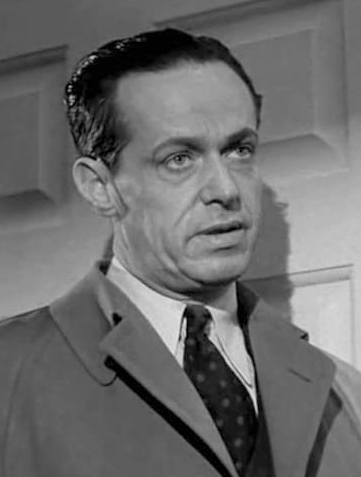
Yarborough in Saboteur (1942)

Yarborough appeared as Doc Long in three feature films for Columbia Pictures, based on the radio series I Love a Mystery: I Love a Mystery in 1945, The Devil's Mask and The Unknown. Yarborough adopted a Southern accent for the Doc Long character, and would retain the dialect for Dragnet. (In private life Yarborough spoke without a trace of an accent, as evidenced in his motion picture appearances of the early 1940s.)

He started work on the Dragnet television series in 1951. However, the day after he filmed the second episode, he suffered a heart attack, and died four days later at age 51. After his death, his One Man's Family character was dropped without explanation while his death was worked into Dragnet by having Ben Romero also die of a heart attack in the episode "The Big Sorrow."

== Personal life ==
Yarborough married radio actress Barbara Jo Allen (later known professionally as Vera Vague). They had a daughter, Joan, and divorced shortly after in 1931. He married again in 1949, to Janet Warren.

== Death ==
Yarborough died of a heart attack in Burbank, California, at age 51. Dragnet was in production at the time, and the radio episode "The Big Sorrow", which aired eight days after Yarborough's death, portrayed Joe Friday dealing with the sudden death of Ben Romero and being assigned a new partner. The like-named television episode, which was broadcast on September 25, 1952, opened with star Jack Webb reciting a dedication of the episode to Yarborough's memory. (Note: For more information about this dedication, see Dragnet Ep. 133, "The Big Sorrow") Yarborough is interred at Forest Lawn Memorial Park in Glendale, California.

== Selected filmography ==
- They Meet Again (1941) – Bob Webster
- Let's Go Collegiate (1941) – Coach Walsh
- The Ghost of Frankenstein (1942) – Dr. Kettering
- Saboteur (1942) – First FBI Man at Mason's House (uncredited)
- I Love a Mystery (1945) – Doc Long
- Captain Tugboat Annie (1945) – Missouri Jones
- The Red Dragon (1945) – Joseph Bradish
- Idea Girl (1946) – Pete Barlow
- The Devil's Mask (1946) – Doc Long
- The Unknown (1946) – Doc Long
- Wife Wanted (1946) – Walter Desmond
- Kilroy Was Here (1947) – Prof. Thomas Shepherd
- Shed No Tears (1948) – 2nd Insurance Investigator (uncredited)
- The Babe Ruth Story (1948) – Doctor at Huggins Bedside (uncredited)
- Henry, the Rainmaker (1949) – The Reverend Bascom
- Deadline – U.S.A. (1952) – Male Secretary (uncredited) (final film role)
