= The Missing Juror =

1944 film by Budd Boetticher

- Directed by: Budd Boetticher (as Oscar Boetticher Jr.)
- Screenplay by: Charles O'Neal
- Story by: Leon Abrams; Richard Hill Wilkinson
- Produced by: Wallace MacDonald
- Starring: Jim Bannon; Janis Carter; George Macready; Jean Stevens
- Cinematography: L. William O'Connell (as L.W. O'Connell)
- Edited by: Paul Borofsky
- Color process: Black and white
- Production company: Columbia Pictures
- Distributed by: Columbia Pictures
- Release date: November 16, 1944
- Running time: 66 minutes
- Country: United States
- Language: English

The Missing Juror is a 1944 American film noir mystery film directed by Budd Boetticher (as Oscar Boetticher Jr.) and starring Jim Bannon, Janis Carter, George Macready and Jean Stevens.

== Plot ==
In this suspenseful film, a sinister figure is targeting the individuals who played a role in condemning a murderer to death. In the midst of this drama, after six members of the pivotal jury have met gruesome fates, investigative journalist Jim Bannon embarks on a relentless pursuit to locate the surviving jurors and ultimately unveil the enigmatic killer. What emerges is a shocking revelation: the original murderer, presumed dead in a conflagration at a mental institution, has somehow managed to escape his supposed demise. To add to the twisted plot, the body of the jury foreman was mistakenly identified as the murderer's, thereby allowing the vengeful culprit to execute a sinister plan for retribution. Janis Carter plays a crucial role as Bannon's romantic partner, offering her unwavering support throughout the harrowing ordeal.

== Cast ==
- Jim Bannon as Joe Keats
- Janis Carter as Alice Hill
- George Macready as Harry Wharton/ Jerome K. Bentley
- Jean Stevens as Tex Tuttle
- Joseph Crehan as Willard Apple aka Falstaff

== See also ==
- List of American films of 1944
