= Jim Bannon =

American actor (1911–84)

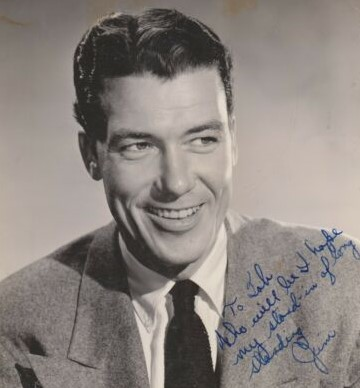
- Bannon in 1945
- Born: James Shorttel Bannon; April 9, 1911; Kansas City, Missouri, U.S.
- Died: July 28, 1984 (aged 73); Ventura, California, U.S.
- Occupations: Actor; announcer
- Years active: 1938–1965
- Spouses: Bea Benaderet (m. 1938; div. 1950) Barbara Cork (m. 1961; div. 1981)
- Children: 2, including Jack Bannon

James Shorttel Bannon (April 9, 1911 – July 28, 1984) was an American actor and radio announcer known for his work on the I Love a Mystery and Red Ryder series during the 1940s and 1950s.

== Early life ==
Born in 1911 in Kansas City, Missouri, Bannon attended Rockhurst High School and Rockhurst University, where he played football, baseball, and polo. In 1944, he was ineligible (classified 4-F) for World War II service, owing to an ulcer, so served as a civilian flight instructor.

== Career ==
Bannon began his broadcasting career on local radio station KCKN, then briefly at KMOX in St. Louis. He moved to Los Angeles in 1937, beginning his show-business career in radio as an announcer on The Great Gildersleeve, The Chase and Sanborn Hour, and Stars over Hollywood, among others, with his most prominent acting role being that of Detective Jack Packard in the serial I Love a Mystery. A motion-picture adaptation of the show, with Bannon reprising his radio character, was released by Columbia Pictures in 1945 in hopes of launching a franchise, but only two additional pictures were produced; he later described the original film as "a weakened product" in his 1975 autobiography.

Bannon left radio in 1946 to sign with Columbia as a contract player in his attempt to become a Western movie star, but then left the next year for Republic Pictures. He first served as a stuntman and double before being cast as the lead in his first picture with the company, the 1948 serial Dangers of the Canadian Mounted. While filming The Man from Colorado (1949), Bannon punched director Charles Vidor during an on-set altercation. Vidor was later fired from the production because of conflicts with star William Holden and replaced by Henry Levin, who had directed Bannon in the I Love a Mystery film adaptation. Bannon teamed with Whip Wilson and Fuzzy Knight in five low-budget Westerns for Monogram Pictures, all released in 1951.

Bannon is best known for being the last of four actors to portray the fictional cowboy Red Ryder in the long-running B-movie series, completing between 1949 and 1950 what would be the final four pictures in the franchise that were distributed by Eagle-Lion Films, after Republic had let its series rights expire. Bannon openly campaigned for the part by outfitting his car with a Texas Longhorn hood ornament and a Colt 45-style gearshift knob while dressing in Western attire. Upon being cast, he dyed his salt-and-pepper hair red and regularly visited a hairstylist in Louisville, Kentucky, to keep it maintained. Bannon said in 1965 that it was the "toughest part of" playing Red Ryder, "since the pictures were in color." His offscreen requirements in portraying the character included making personal appearances in costume across the country, in addition to a stint with the Tom Packs Circus in 1950.

Following the end of the Red Ryder series, Bannon appeared in films of varying genres before transitioning to Western roles on television. He starred along with Barry Curtis in Flying A Productions' 1955 series The Adventures of Champion, which lasted for one 26-episode season. He then filmed two guest appearances on another Flying A show, Annie Oakley, the next year. Meanwhile, fellow Red Ryder actor Allan "Rocky" Lane and he shot separate pilots for a proposed television series in 1951 and 1955, respectively, but both failed to sell. Bannon relocated to Chicago in 1955 to film one season of soap opera Hawkins Falls, Population 6200.

Bannon worked sporadically in the 1960s with bit parts on programs such as Sea Hunt, Wagon Train, and Lassie. His final role was a one-time guest spot on Death Valley Days in 1965. He then moved to Phoenix, Arizona, to join radio station KTAR as a morning news broadcaster and the host of his own afternoon show.

== Personal life ==
Bannon was the first husband of American actress and comedian Bea Benaderet. They wed in 1938 and had two children, Jack (1940–2017) and Maggie (b. 1947). However, his Red Ryder contract obligations took a toll on their marriage, and Benaderet filed for divorce in 1950. Their son, Jack Bannon, became an actor like his parents. In 1961, Jim Bannon married Barbara Cork, 23 years his junior; the couple divorced in 1981.

Later in his life, Bannon suffered from emphysema. He died in Ventura, California, on July 28, 1984, at age 73.

== Selected filmography ==
- Riders of the Deadline (1943)
- The Soul of a Monster (1944) - Dr. Roger Vance
- Sergeant Mike (1944) - Lt. Patrick Henry
- The Missing Juror (1944) - Joe Keats
- Tonight and Every Night (1945) - Life Photographer
- I Love a Mystery (1945) - Jack Packard
- The Gay Senorita (1945) - Phil Dolan
- Out of the Depths (1945) - Capt. Faversham
- The Devil's Mask (1946) - Jack Packard
- Renegades (1946) - Cash Dembrow
- The Unknown (1946) - Jack Packard
- Johnny O'Clock (1947) - Chuck Blayden
- The 13th Hour (1947) - Jerry Mason
- Framed (1947) - Jack Woodworth
- The Corpse Came C.O.D. (1947) - Det. Lt. Mark Wilson
- T-Men (1947) - Agent Lindsay
- Dangers of the Canadian Mounted (1948, Serial) - Sgt. Chris Royal, RCMP
- Trail to Laredo (1948) - Dan Parks
- Miraculous Journey (1948) - Nick Travelli
- Frontier Revenge (1948) - Brant - Henchman
- The Man from Colorado (1948) - Nagel
- Ride, Ryder, Ride! (1949) - Red Ryder
- Daughter of the Jungle (1949) - Kenneth Richards
- Roll, Thunder, Roll! (1949) - Red Ryder
- The Fighting Redhead (1949) - Red Ryder
- Cowboy and the Prizefighter (1949) - Red Ryder
- Jiggs and Maggie Out West (1950) - 'Snake-Bite' Carter
- Kill the Umpire (1950) - Dusty (uncredited)
- Sierra Passage (1950) - Jud Yorke
- Ridin' the Outlaw Trail (1951) - Ace Donley
- Dead or Alive (1951) - U. S. Marshal Jim Bannon
- Canyon Raiders (1951) - Himself
- Nevada Badmen (1951) - Himself
- The Texas Rangers (1951) - Jeff Barton - Outlaw (uncredited)
- Stagecoach Driver (1951) - Himself
- Unknown World (1951) - Andy Ostergaard
- Lawless Cowboys (1951) - Himself
- The Great Missouri Raid (1951)
- Rodeo (1952) - Bat Gorman
- Phantom from Space (1953) - Police Sergeant
- The Great Jesse James Raid (1953) - Bob Ford
- Jack Slade (1953) - Farnsworth
- War Arrow (1953) - Capt. Roger Corwin
- The Command (1954) - Infantryman (uncredited)
- Chicago Confidential (1957) - Pilot (uncredited)
- Too Much, Too Soon (1958) - Actor as Thomas Jefferson in Play (uncredited)
- Bat Masterson (1958) - Town Sheriff
- Girls on the Loose (1958) - Vault Guard (uncredited)
- The Shaggy Dog (1959) - Betz, FBI Stenographer (uncredited)
- They Came to Cordura (1959) - Capt. Paltz
- Inside the Mafia (1959) - Louie - Regent Associate (uncredited)
- 40 Pounds of Trouble (1962) - Western Gambler (uncredited)
- A Gathering of Eagles (1963) - Col. Morse
- Man's Favorite Sport? (1964) - Forest Ranger (uncredited)
- Good Neighbor Sam (1964) - Policeman (uncredited)
