= Three Wishes for Jamie =

- Original Cast Recording
- Music: Ralph Blane
- Lyrics: Ralph Blane
- Book: Charles O'Neal; Abe Burrows
- Basis: Charles O'Neal' novel The Three Wishes of Jamie McRuin
- Productions: 1952 Broadway

Three Wishes for Jamie is a musical with a book by Charles O'Neal and Abe Burrows and music and lyrics by Ralph Blane.

Based on O'Neal's 1949 novel The Three Wishes of Jamie McRuin, the fantasy focuses on the title character, a young Irishman who, when offered three wishes by the Queen of the Fairies, chooses travel, a bride, and a son who can speak Gaelic. The granting of the first brings him to Atlanta, Georgia, where the second is fulfilled in the form of Maeve Harrigan. But the third will prove to be more difficult to enjoy when it is discovered his new wife is unable to conceive and the couple adopts a mute boy.

== Production history ==
In July 1951, the musical was staged at the Philharmonic Auditorium, Los Angeles and at the Curran Theatre in San Francisco by producer Edwin Lester and director Albert Lewis with John Raitt as Jamie and Cecil Kellaway as Owen Travis, but neither critical nor audience reaction justified a move to New York City. Abe Burrows replaced O'Neal's original collaborator Charles Lederer, consolidated the three acts into two, tailored the role of Jamie specifically for John Raitt, and eliminated most of the West Coast cast.

After tryouts in New Haven, Boston, and Philadelphia, the Broadway production opened on March 21, 1952 at the Mark Hellinger Theatre. The opening had been delayed for two weeks to give Burrows "more time in which to improve the musical", and so added a tryout in Philadelphia. It transferred to the Plymouth Theatre for the final week of its 92 performance run. Directed by Burrows and choreographed by Herbert Ross, Eugene Loring, and Ted Cappy. The cast included Raitt, Anne Jeffreys as Maeve, with Bert Wheeler, Charlotte Rae, Walter Burke, Malcolm Keen, and Jeff Morrow in supporting roles.

Musicals Tonight! (New York) presented the musical in October - November 2010 in a staged concert. The Backstage reviewer wrote "With its convoluted, plot-heavy book and generic, second-tier score, it's not hard to understand how 'Three Wishes for Jamie' folded after only 91 performances."

An original cast recording was released by Capitol Records.

== Songs ==
Source:The Guide to Musical Theatre

Act I

- The Wake
- The Girl That I Court in My Mind
- My Home's a Highway
- We're for Love
- My Heart's Darlin
- Goin' On a Hayride
- Love Has Nothing to Do With Looks (Lyrics by Charles Lederer)
- My Heart's Darlin (Reprise)
- I'll Sing You a Song
- It Must Be Spring
- Wedding March

Act II

- The Army Mule Song
- What Do I Know?
- Expectant Father (Music by Lee Pockriss)
- It's a Wishing World
- Trottin' to the Fair
- Love Has Nothing to Do With Looks (Reprise)
- April Face
- It's a Wishing World (Reprise)
