= List of Dragnet (radio series) episodes =

Dragnet, the radio series, premiered on NBC on June 3, 1949, and ended on February 26, 1957. A set of 314 original episodes aired between June 1949 and September 1955 with ".22 Rifle For Christmas" and "The Big Little Jesus" usually re-run during Christmas time. Re-runs were broadcast from the end of September 1955 to February 1957. The vast majority of the episodes are available free on various sites around the Internet.

== 1949 season ==
No.	Title	Case Details (Partner/Boss/Department)	Background Information (Date/Weather)	Original release date
1	"Production #1 Robbery" "George Slocum, Thief"	Ben Romero; Chief of Detectives Ed Backstrand; Robbery	N/A	June 3, 1949
In the series' first episode, LAPD Sergeant Joe Friday and his partner Ben Romero must keep an eye on George Slocum, a known thief who has escaped prosecution before.
2	"Production #2 Homicide" "The Nickel Plated Gun"	Ben Romero; Chief of Detectives Ed Backstrand; Homicide (Nightwatch)	Tuesday March 25th Cold	June 10, 1949
A nickel-plated .44 caliber Smith & Wesson is used to shoot two officers, but conflicting descriptions of the assailants from multiple witnesses create a unique challenge, further complicated when it turns out there are two guns involved.
3	"Production #3 Robbery" "The Werewolf"	Ben Romero; Chief of Detectives Ed Backstrand; Robbery (Early Morning Watch)	Thursday February 2nd Raining	June 17, 1949
Friday and Romero go searching for a criminal dubbed "The Werewolf" by the media, who has beaten up and robbed eighteen young women in LA's Central district. The nickname for the criminal caught on because he is big, hairy, and ugly. He always seems to be one step ahead of the LAPD.
4	"Production 4 Homicide" "Quick Trigger Gunmen"	Ben Romero; Chief of Detectives Ed Backstrand; Homicide (Nightwatch)	Wednesday April 17th Warm	June 24, 1949
A cop on a stake-out is killed by a shotgun blast from three quick-trigger gunmen in a bar. Friday's boss wants the killers caught before the next sunrise; soon, Friday, Romero, and other members of the LAPD trap the killers in an apartment house.
5	"The Helen Corday Murder" "Who Killed Helen Corday?"	Ben Romero; Chief of Detectives Ed Backstrand; Homicide (Nightwatch)	Thursday March 19th Foggy	July 7, 1949
A well-liked 21-year-old waitress named Helen Corday is murdered with a steel pipe. With no known motive for the killing, Friday and Romero follow a perplexing trail of false leads in search of the truth. Later remade for television in Season 5 of the 1951 TV Series, episode #126, "The Big Pipe".
6	"The Red Light Bandit" "The Impostor"	Ben Romero; Chief of Detectives Ed Backstrand; Robbery (Nightwatch)	Wednesday June 4th Warm	July 14, 1949
A robber disguised as a police officer goes on a crime spree over several months. Helpless citizens are kidnapped, robbed, and beaten senseless by the fake cop. He usually strikes when his victims pull up to a red traffic light; when one of his victims dies, the LAPD turns up the heat, especially when Friday and Romero realize the killer has been taunting them the entire time without them realizing it.
7	"Attempted City Hall Bombing"	Ben Romero; Chief of Detectives Ed Backstrand; Not Assigned	Tuesday November 15th Raining	July 21, 1949
Friday has been off duty for two hours when he receives an emergency phone call from Chief of Detectives Ed Backstrand. An entire block in the heart of the city has been threatened with complete destruction by Vernon Carney. He is threatening to blow up City Hall with a bomb if his brother isn't freed from jail by nine o'clock. Friday and Romero are tasked with getting the bomb away from him before it is too late.
8	"Missing Persons - Juanita Lasky" "The Big Missing"	Ben Romero; Chief of Detectives Ed Backstrand; Missing Persons (Daywatch)	Monday December 12th Cold	July 28, 1949
As the Christmas season approaches, Friday and Romero receive a call from Utah from the mother of a woman named Juanita Laskey, who tells them that her daughter has stopped writing to her and is calling to report her missing. Friday and Romero must try to bring her home for a Christmas reunion.
9	"Benny Trounsel - Narcotics"	Ben Romero; Chief of Detectives Ed Backstrand; Narcotics (Nightwatch)	Thursday March 23rd Windy	August 4, 1949
Friday and Romero search for the murderer of an informant — small-time narcotics user Benny Trounsel — who was beaten to death shortly after tipping the authorities to a new narcotics ring stealing from doctor's offices and hospitals.
10	"Maniac Murderer" "A Mad Killer at Large"	Ben Romero; Chief of Detectives Ed Backstrand; Homicide (Nightwatch)	Wednesday January 12th Raining	August 11, 1949
Friday and Romero are on the trail of a psychotic homicidal maniac who has killed and mutilated several young women in Los Angeles. Special Note: This marks the first series appearance of Harry Morgan, who would later play Officer Bill Gannon in both the 1966 film and the subsequent TV series. He plays the hotel manager, Ford.
11	"Sixteen Days of Jewel Thefts" "Master Jewel Thief"	Ben Romero; Chief of Detectives Ed Backstrand; Burglary (Daywatch)	Tuesday June 17th Warm	August 18, 1949
A sudden wave of jewel thefts is sweeping the city. In sixteen days, sixteen burglaries have been committed, one each night. The trail leads to Walter Tracy, but Friday and Romero soon realise that finding the loot is a lot harder than finding Tracy, who won't reveal the location of the stolen jewels.
12	"Police Academy - Mario Koski" "The Blitz Bandits"	Ben Romero; Chief of Detectives Ed Backstrand; Robbery (Daywatch)	Thursday October 23rd Windy	August 25, 1949
A gang of "blitz bandits" have started to rob liquor stores and restaurants around Los Angeles. They are fast and efficient, with three to four and even five robberies each night. While Friday and Romero search for this gang of robbers, one of Joe's Army buddies joins the police force.
13	"Auto Burglaries - Myra the Redhead"	Ben Romero; Chief of Detectives Ed Backstrand; Traffic: Auto Theft (Nightwatch)	Monday March 2nd Cold	September 1, 1949
The mysterious "Myra" has been using teams of youngsters to break into and steal valuables from parked automobiles. In three months, they have broken into 250 cars, and property mounting well over $1,000 has been stolen. Two useful members of the gang have been apprehended, and Friday and Romero interrogate them in an attempt to reveal the name of the operation's ringleader.
14	"Eric Kelby - Buried Body in Nursery" "Missing Woman"	Ben Romero; Chief of Detectives Ed Backstrand; Homicide (Daywatch)	Wednesday September 15th Warm	September 3, 1949
Agnes Kelby has suddenly disappeared from her home; on the surface, it appears only as a routine missing persons case. Friday and Romero investigate and find that Eric Kelby, Agnes's husband, is acting very suspiciously by insisting that his wife isn't missing.
15	"Sullivan Kidnapping - The Wolf"	Ben Romero; Chief of Detectives Ed Backstrand; Homicide (Nightwatch)	Tuesday October 18th Cloudy	September 10, 1949
Friday and Romero try to catch a kidnapper after a 21-year-old girl has disappeared and a letter has been received demanding $30,000 for the girl's return. The letter is signed "The Wolf." The specific case that this episode is based on is the Marion Parker case in 1927.
16	"James Vickers - Cop Killing"	Ben Romero; Chief of Detectives Ed Backstrand; Homicide (Daywatch)	Thursday November 16th Foggy	September 17, 1949
Officer John Bemis is shot and mortally wounded. One of the suspects, the shooter, James Vickers, is apprehended by Friday and Romero, but the other is still at large. When the officer dies, and the suspect in custody is shot and killed while attempting to escape, the hunt for the other shooter intensifies.
17	"Brick-Bat Slayer"	Ben Romero; Chief of Detectives Ed Backstrand; Homicide (Daywatch)	Tuesday June 3rd Warm	September 24, 1949
A homicidal maniac wielding a brick-bat is loose in the city. In every instance he leaves the murder weapon behind and there are no fingerprints or clues for the police to identify him. A 1,000-man dragnet slowly gets him cornered, and it's up to Friday, Romero and the other members of the LAPD to get the killer before he strikes again.
18	"Tom Laval - Truck Hi-jackers"	Ben Romero; Chief of Detectives Ed Backstrand; Burglary (Nightwatch)	Thueday March 6th Windy	October 1, 1949
A gang of hijackers has started to work in Los Angeles and have stolen truckloads of $80,000 in valuable merchandise. The cops have a lead on a Thomas Laval, who admits to being involved in a truck hijacking. While in Friday and Romero's custody, he jumps out of a window, and both detectives are accused of pushing him to his death.
19	"Second Hand Killer"	Ben Romero; Chief of Detectives Ed Backstrand; Homicide	N/A	October 6, 1949
Unknown, Program not available.
20	"The Big Buy - Narcotics"	Ben Romero; Chief of Detectives Ed Backstrand; Narcotics	N/A	October 13, 1949
Unknown, Program not available.
21	"The Big Lamp" "Conrad Buckley - Anthracene"	Ben Romero; Chief of Detectives Ed Backstrand; Burglary	N/A	October 20, 1949
Unknown, Program not available.; Though the Radio episode is unavailable, there has been a TV adaptation which is still available. In the TV adaptation a veteran thief is acquitted and a year later the police monitor him when he returns to LA.
22	"The Big Drink" "Hugh Taylor - Wife Murderer"	Ben Romero; Chief of Detectives Ed Backstrand; Homicide	N/A	October 27, 1949
Unknown, Program not available.
23	"Casco And Breen" "Forgery - Johnny Casco, Marty Breen"	Ben Romero; Chief of Detectives Ed Backstrand; Forgery	TBA	November 3, 1949
Unknown, Program not available.
24	"The Big Bar" "Robbery-Murder - Juan Pedillo, Wesley Guttridge"	Ben Romero; Chief of Detectives Ed Backstrand; Robbery	N/A	November 10, 1949
Unknown, Program not available.
25	"Bunco - Harry Girard"	Ben Romero; Chief of Detectives Ed Backstrand; Bunco	N/A	November 17, 1949
Unknown, Program not available.
26	"Mrs. Rinard, Albert Barry – Mother-in-Law Murder"	Ben Romero; Chief of Detectives Ed Backstrand; Homicide (Daywatch)	Saturday November 5th Foggy	November 24, 1949
Mr. Reynard's mother has been murdered and his wife is suspected of being the killer. But the clear cut case of a woman murdering her mother-in-law to hide an affair soon falls apart, leaving Joe and Ben to search for the real killer.
27	"Spring Street Gang - Juveniles"	Ben Romero; Chief of Detectives Ed Backstrand; Juvenile (Nightwatch)	Sunday March 27th Windy	December 1, 1949
A rash of thefts and robberies have broken out across the city and suspicion points to an organized gang of juveniles hanging out on Spring Street, where a shady soda fountain owner is suspected of being their fence. One of the gang members has been wounded and another is shot by a night watchman while committing a robbery. Friday and Romero must try to round up and arrest the gang of youths before anyone else is killed.
28	"George Quan – The Jade Thumb Rings"	Ben Romero; Chief of Detectives Ed Backstrand; Robbery (Daywatch)	Monday December 1st Foggy	December 8, 1949
Friday and Romero search for a suspect who beat a Chinese man using a handful of buckshot in a handkerchief and stole $8,000 in rare Chinese jade. The only witness is an observant six-year-old boy with a wild imagination.
29	"The Garbage Chute Murder – Laura Barkley"	Ben Romero; Chief of Detectives Thad Brown; Homicide (Daywatch)	Tuesday January 9th Stormy	December 15, 1949
A young woman named Laura Barkley has been murdered—strangled with a lamp cord—and her body was discovered behind locked doors. The killer seems to have entered through an unused garbage chute and is still at large.
30	".22 Rifle for Christmas"	Ben Romero; Chief of Detectives Thad Brown; Homicide (Nightwatch)	Thursday December 22nd Cold	December 22, 1949
A young boy, aged 9 years old, named Stanley Johnstone is reported missing from his home, and so is the .22 caliber rifle he was going to get for Christmas. Foul play is suspected.
31	"The Roseland Roof Murders"	Ben Romero; Chief of Detectives Thad Brown; Robbery (Nightwatch)	Saturday July 21st Hot	December 29, 1949
A gang of holdup men have been running loose in Los Angeles and are heavily armed and quick to shoot. They have committed more than a dozen robberies, usually drugstores, but one night they rob and kill the manager of a dance hall. A stake-out in a garage yields some arrests and a total of twelve guns are recovered. After a trial, two of the gang break out of jail and have to be recaptured.

== 1950 season ==
No.	Title	Case Details (Partner/Boss/Department)	Background Information (Date/Weather)	Original release date
32	"Max Tyler – Escaped Convict" "The Big Escape"	Ben Romero; Chief of Detectives Thad Brown; Robbery (Nightwatch)	Tuesday February 8th Cold	January 5, 1950
Two armed bandits have robbed large jewelry stores in the city. One suspect escapes but one is apprehended and identified as a friend of Friday's, Max Tyler. However, Tyler escapes from jail, and shoots and injures Romero. It's up to Friday to recapture him again.
33	"The Big Man Part 1 (Narcotics)"	Ben Romero; Chief of Detectives Thad Brown; Narcotics (Nightwatch)	Thursday January 21st Cold	January 12, 1950
A vicious criminal has resumed his narcotics operations in the city. The police know his name and know he's guilty, so Friday goes undercover to try to get evidence on him by infiltrating a Flats gang of narcotics pushers.
34	"The Big Man Part 2 (Narcotics)"	Ben Romero; Chief of Detectives Thad Brown; Narcotics (Nightwatch)	Wednesday July 9th Warm	January 19, 1950
For seven months, Friday's been working with federal and state agents in breaking a narcotics ring. After returning to active duty from his undercover assignment (from part 1), he helped apprehend a small fry in the narcotics trade. The police then turn their attention to the number one man in the narcotics business on the west coast, the big man, Arthur Z. Belmont. A stakeout begins in Manhattan Beach.
35	"Claude Jimmerson - Child Killer"	Ben Romero; Chief of Detectives Thad Brown; Homicide (Nightwatch)	Monday October 27th Cloudy	February 2, 1950
Two little girls, aged seven and eleven, are reported missing at about 3:45pm. Somewhere between their homes and the neighbourhood grocery store they dropped from sight. Foul play is suspected when their pet Collie is later found beaten to death.: Jack Webb gives a disclaimer about this episode not being suitable for children.
36	"The Big Girl"	Ben Romero; Chief of Detectives Thad Brown; Robbery (Nightwatch)	Wednesday October 3rd Warm	February 9, 1950
The cops search for a big blonde who shoots her victims in cold blood. So far sixteen persons have been robbed and beaten senseless. The victims describe the assailant as a tall, beautiful woman, but there is a possibility it could be a man wearing woman's clothing.
37	"The Big Grifter"	Ben Romero; Chief of Detectives Thad Brown; Bunco (Daywatch)	Tuesday July 28th Warm	February 23, 1950
An expert confidence man, "Gentleman Wallace", has resumed operations in Los Angeles. His criminal record dates back thirty-five years. He's a born con-man, a master in the art of the gentle swindle whose taken advantage of two used-car dealers, and many others.
38	"The Big Kill"	Ben Romero; Chief of Detectives Thad Brown; Homicide (Daywatch)	Sunday May 23rd Warm	March 2, 1950
A police officer is shot down on the front steps of his home. There's no apparent motive for the shooting and the assailant escaped in a blue sedan. Jack Carver, just out of Folsom, is later suspected of killing the cop for revenge for sending him to prison. Friday poses as a criminal in jail to find the missing murder weapon.
39	"The Big Thank You"	Ben Romero; Chief of Detectives Thad Brown; Homicide (Daywatch)	Thursday March 9th Foggy	March 9, 1950
A confessed murderer, Annie Johnson, is paroled from the state prison for women following a murder conviction. After seven months, the parole office loses contact with her. She is then suspected of harming Laura Muller, the woman responsible for her parole and has since disappeared. Foul play is suspected. Based on the story of Louise Peete.
40	"The Big Boys"	Ben Romero; Chief of Detectives Thad Brown; Robbery (Daywatch)	Friday December 10th Cold	March 16, 1950
A gang of four young hoodlums and their puppy have come to Los Angeles from San Francisco. They are already wanted for a series of robberies in San Francisco and are planning to pull a big job in Los Angeles. They're armed, reckless and cold-blooded, but a long stake-out with an alcoholic desk clerk might provide results.
41	"The Big Gangster Part 1"	Ben Romero; Chief of Detectives Thad Brown; Homicide (Nightwatch)	Tuesday July 18th Hot	March 23, 1950
Attempts have been made on the life of a notorious gangster, Gus Valentine. If he dies, it could mean an open gang war. Even though he is on the wrong side of the law, the cops must protect him.
42	"The Big Gangster Part 2"	Ben Romero; Chief of Detectives Thad Brown; Homicide (Nightwatch)	Saturday July 22nd Hot	March 30, 1950
Notorious gangster Gus Valentine has been shot to death, a gang war is threatened, and his gang members seek revenge. It is Friday and Romero's job to find his killers before the other gangsters do.
43	"The Big Book" "The Big Smut Press"	Ben Romero; Inspector Lester; Juvenile (Daywatch)	Monday October 21st Cool	April 6, 1950
High schools have been flooded with obscene, filthy, pornographic "comic" book literature. The Police stamp out one source and a dozen more spring up. Friday and Romero make a presentation to the local PTA and a lead brings them to a cigar stand downtown and a man called "Barney" and then eventually to the printer.
44	"The Big Watch"	Ben Romero; Chief of Detectives Thad Brown; Robbery (Nightwatch)	Wednesday February 3rd Cold	April 13, 1950
A gang of vicious "Hitch-Hike Bandits" are committing assaults, robberies and attempted murders. Their victims are army officers stationed in the city. After one of the victims is killed by the gunmen, a manhunt is on.
45	"The Big Trial"	Ben Romero; Captain Sullivan; Traffic: Accident Investigation- Hit and Run Felony Detail (Nightwatch)	Monday September 4th Hot	April 20, 1950
In the early hours of the morning Sheila Gordon is struck down by a hit-and-run driver. After three months of grueling police work, she takes a payoff not to show up for the trial of the guy who struck her down. Friday and Romero have to chase her down.
46	"The Big Job"	Ben Romero; Captain Blane Steve; Bunco-Fugitive (Nightwatch)	Thursday April 27th Warm	April 27, 1950
The Police receive information that an escaped criminal, called Alfred Garvey, is hiding out in the City. While searching for him at a hotel Garvey shoots an off-duty cop, and friend of Friday and Romero, John Maxwell. He was about to go on vacation but decided to visit Friday and Romero first. Soon a Police manhunt is launched to find Garvey.
47	"The Big Badge"	Ben Romero; Chief of Detectives Thad Brown; Homicide (Nightwatch)	Wednesday March 7th Cloudy	May 4, 1950
For two months, "The Badge Bandit", a depraved criminal who pretends to be a police officer, has struck fifteen times. Men and women have been robbed, brutally attacked. Friday and Policewoman Dorothy Rivers go on a stakeout to catch him, along with several other members of the LAPD.
48	"The Big Knife"	Ben Romero; Captain Bowling; Juvenile (Daywatch)	Thursday November 4th Windy	May 11, 1950
Twenty one girls have been knifed while at a high school. So far there's only been assaults, no murders, but with a potential killer roaming the halls of the high school, the Police are called in.
49	"The Big Pug"	Ben Romero; Captain Ed Walker; Robbery (Daywatch)	Saturday August 9th Hot	May 18, 1950
Two criminals rob and beat up Myrtle Shaw, an elderly woman, who was on her way to the bank. The suspects are cruel and ruthless, so it's the police and Friday's job to find them.
50	"The Big Key"	Ben Romero; Captain Blane Steve; Homicide	Sunday December 25th Raining	May 25, 1950
Maria Comacho is found murdered in a churchyard; her body shows the marks of a savage attack. The clues are meager: a key, a pen, and some shoe polish smear.
51	"The Big Fake"	Ben Romero; Deputy Chief Coleman; Personnel (Daywatch)	Wednesday April 9th Foggy	June 1, 1950
A drunk files a report of robbery and assault (including breaking his arm) against a rookie police officer. The Rookie cop denies the accusations.
52	"The Big Smart Guy"	Ben Romero; Chief of Detectives Thad Brown; Homicide (Nightwatch)	Friday March 16th Damp	June 8, 1950
Elizabeth Benham has been shot to death. The apparent motive, according to her husband, was a robbery. The killer, Jack Morrison, also known as Tommy Kane, is suspected to have committed the murder, but it is believed that he had help.
53	"The Big Purse"	Ben Romero; Captain Ed Walker; Robbery (Nightwatch)	Monday July 1st Mild	June 15, 1950
Scores of lone women have been beaten and robbed by two young purse-snatchers working in a downtown neighbourhood. The victims have been unable to identify the two young hoodlums.
54	"The Big Mink"	Ben Romero; Captain Blane Steve; Homicide (Nightwatch)	Saturday November 23rd Warm	June 22, 1950
The owner of a fur store, Albert Criver, has been shot and killed; his wife found the body. The only lead is a missing mink fur coat which had been taken before the murder. Albert's 1940 Oldsmobile is also missing and his wife mentions the license keychain tag distributed by the Veteran's Administration.
55	"The Big Grab"	Ben Romero; Chief of Detectives Thad Brown; Homicide (Nightwatch)	Tuesday April 4th Warm	June 29, 1950
A woman, Mrs. Kessell, has been kidnapped, taken from her home by a man posing as a police officer. Friday, Romero, and Brown join Professor Kessell for a Passover Seder.
56	"The Big Frame"	Ben Romero; Lieutenant Calfy; Traffic: Accident Investigation - Hit and Run Felony Detail (Daywatch)	Monday April 19th Windy	July 6, 1950
A dead body is found in the streets in the early hours of the morning. He is later identified as Edward Stokes, a victim of a hit and run driver.
57	"The Big Bomb"	Ben Romero; Deputy Chief Lin White; Unassigned	Tuesday November 15th Raining	July 13, 1950
Friday has been off-duty for 2 hours when he receives an emergency phone call from the Deputy Chief of Police. An entire block in the heart of the city has been threatened with complete destruction by Vernon Carney. He is threatening to blow up City Hall with a bomb if his brother, Elwood Carney, isn't freed from jail by nine o'clock.: Remake of "Attempted City Hall Bombing".
58	"The Big Gent Part 1" "Frank Chaney - The Gentleman Bandit: Part 1"	Ben Romero; Captain Ed Walker; Robbery (Daywatch)	Tuesday October 6th Cool	July 20, 1950
A hold-up has been committed in a neighbouring city where a bystander is shot to death and two others are wounded. The bandits are ruthless, well armed and currently known to be in the area. Friday and Romero identify one of them as Frank Cheney, The Gentleman Bandit, a rich man who robs and kills for fun, even after an eighteen year stay in Folsom State Prison. Soon, Stanley Turk Webber, Cheney's partner in crime, is captured, but Cheney remains at large.
59	"The Big Gent Part 2" "Frank Chaney - The Gentleman Bandit: Part 2"	Ben Romero; Captain Ed Walker; Robbery (Daywatch)	Tuesday June 6th Cloudy	July 27, 1950
Three persons are shot down in a twelve thousand dollar hold up. One of the bandits, Stanley Turk Webber, is apprehended, convicted and sent to prison for life. The other one, Frank Chaney, is still at large. But thanks to a tip from Cheney's father, he is captured at a freighter loading dynamite in the harbor. Meanwhile, in an unrelated subplot, Friday calls fellow officer, Dorothy Rivers, about her lost purse and their date at the movies the previous night. Friday works up the courage to ask her to have dinner with him at his mother's next week.
60	"The Big Dare"	Ben Romero; Captain Blane Steve; Homicide (Nightwatch)	Wednesday September 29th Warm	August 3, 1950
A woman is knifed to death, and her body bears the mark of a brutally slain attack. The Police are called in by the woman's son who had found the body. During the investigation, it's revealed the mom had several boyfriends, and one of her current boyfriends was jealous of her having other boyfriends. As the Dragnet closes in on the killer, his sister arranges for the suspect to surrender.
61	"The Big Actor"	Ben Romero; Captain Curney; Narcotics (Daywatch)	Monday October 23rd Foggy	August 10, 1950
St. Christopher's Hospital pharmacy is held up and $10,000 worth of high grade narcotics are stolen. The Police are called but the bandits escape.
62	"The Big Youngster"	Ben Romero; Inspector Bowling; Juvenile (Daywatch)	Tuesday April 10th Cool	August 17, 1950
A vicious case of wanton and willful destruction of private property occurs to a lawyers office and suspicion points to a juvenile. The police try to find out who did it and why. Meanwhile, a young boy named Arnold Waterman confesses to a murder. When no body is found, Waterman is suspected of being the vandal Friday is looking for.
63	"The Big Chance"	Ben Romero; Chief of Detectives Thad Brown; Homicide (Early Morning Watch)	Monday June 4th Sultry	August 24, 1950
A highway patrolman has disappeared from his cruiser, out in the countryside. His cruiser was found with the motor running and lights on.
64	"The Big Check"	Ben Romero; Captain Elliot; Forgery (Daywatch)	Monday February 4th Cold	August 31, 1950
Friday and Romero must track down an accomplished check forger who passes dozens of small checks—all of them bad. He has started working the city and his victims are small businessmen. The police know his MO but not his identity; soon they get a name Harry Johansson and the Dragnet closes in.
65	"The Big Poison"	Ben Romero; Captain Blane Steve; Homicide (Daywatch)	Saturday September 30th Warm	September 7, 1950
Mr. and Mrs. Apperson, an elderly couple, living in a fashionable neighborhood of the city, have disappeared. There is no trace of them; not a clue to their whereabouts. Foul play is suspected and soon a bottle of cyanide points to a grim conclusion, involving the live-in nephew.
66	"The Big Make"	Ben Romero; Captain Ed Walker; Robbery (Nightwatch)	Tuesday November 3rd Chilly	September 14, 1950
A small bakery, "Stendahl's Bakery Shop", is held up. The perpetrator shot the shop owner and his daughter down without reason.
67	"The Big Pair"	Ben Romero; Chief of Detectives Thad Brown; Burglary (Daywatch)	Monday August 3rd Warm	September 21, 1950
A couple of unidentified thieves start a campaign of burglaries in the city. Homes are broken into and stripped of their furnishings, with the thieves selling all the furniture from the homes they break into, to families out of town, starting with the house of a little girl and her grandfather.
68	"The Big Death"	Ben Romero; Chief of Detectives Thad Brown; Homicide (Daywatch)	Monday February 17th Raining	September 28, 1950
A socially prominent man decides to plot to kill his wife and hires Joe Friday for the job.
69	"The Big 38"	Ben Romero; Captain Walker; Robbery (Nightwatch)	Friday August 17th Hot	October 5, 1950
A store clerk has been murdered, shot to death in a robbery. The holdup man is described as tall, well dressed. Witnesses say he escaped in a taxi cab. The Number of the cab was covered up some way. Seven other armed robberies have been committed in the past 16 days by the same man with the same M.O.
70	"The Big Quack"	Ben Romero; Chief of Detectives Thad Brown; Burglary (Daywatch)	Sunday November 22nd Chilly	October 12, 1950
A man posing as a doctor is burglarizing homes in the city. Marla Hutchins commits suicide after being robbed by the phony Dr. Schulte, owner of the Los Angeles College of Psychotherapeutics. The police have his description and must find him.
71	"The Big Grandma"	Ben Romero; Captain Elliot; Forgery (Daywatch)	Monday April 17th Warm	October 19, 1950
An elderly woman has been passing bad checks for the last nine years. She is an accomplished forger and looks like everyone's grandmother, and never passes a bad check between May and October. She's written more than twenty thousand dollars in bad checks.
72	"The Big Meet"	Ben Romero; Chief of Detectives Thad Brown; Narcotics	Wednesday June 24th Sultry	October 26, 1950
A gang of veteran dope peddlers moves into LA. They offer a hundred thousand dollars' worth of heroin for sale. Sergeant Friday tries to trap Howard Scully, a careful narcotics wholesaler, who leads the gang. Friday goes undercover and poses as a buyer; he meets the leaders contacts and they're ready to do business.
73	"The Big Church"	Ben Romero; Captain Steve; Homicide (Nightwatch)	Tuesday March 8th Cold	November 2, 1950
A new member of the congregation receives anonymous letters and phone calls threatening her with murder. The notes bear the mark of a fanatic, but police suspect fraud until a faked attack confirms their suspicion.: The Second Reformed Church of the Holy Book is the name of the church.
74	"The Big Mother"	Ben Romero; Captain Steve; Homicide (Nightwatch)	Thursday January 28th Raining	November 9, 1950
A newborn, one of the three-day-old Striker baby twins, has been stolen from Mercy Hospital nursery. There is no trace of the infant and there is no trace of the abductor.
75	"The Big Parrot"	Ben Romero; Chief of Detectives Thad Brown; Homicide (Early Morning Watch)	Wednesday April 2nd Windy	November 16, 1950
A man and his wife are found strangled to death in a rooming house, and the killer has set fire to the room to cover his tracks. Also a dead parrot, who's also been strangled, lies on the floor beside the bodies.
76	"The Big Betty"	Ben Romero; Captain McCally; Bunco (Daywatch)	Tuesday December 14th Cold	November 23, 1950
A bunco gang of petty swindlers have set up operations in the city. They work the obituary racket, selling worthless merchandise to the relatives of the deceased. They're experienced, cunning and they work fast.
77	"The Big Car"	Ben Romero; Chief of Detectives Thad Brown; Robbery (Nightwatch)	Monday February 12th Cold	November 30, 1950
In four months, fifteen food markets in Los Angeles have been held up and robbed. The bandit is well-dressed and well-armed, and a bright red Pontiac looks like a clue for the police.
78	"The Big Picture"	Ben Romero; Inspector Bowling; Juvenile (Daywatch)	Tuesday May 7th Mild	December 7, 1950
A pair of fake talent scouts are at work in the city; their victims are young girls seeking careers in Hollywood. The criminals are vicious and relentless.
79	"The Big Break"	Ben Romero; Ed Walker; Robbery (Nightwatch)	Wednesday March 18th Cold	December 14, 1950
Friday and Romero have been tracking a hold up man for months. They finally get a line on where he's hiding but he's dangerous and well armed. After a shoot-out, the criminal, George Hoffman, is arrested but escapes at his arraignment by climbing down the side of a building.
80–30	".22 Rifle for Christmas"	Ben Romero; Chief of Detectives Thad Brown; Homicide (Nightwatch)	Thursday December 22nd Cold	December 21, 1950 (Re-recording of December 22, 1949)
A young boy, aged 9 years old, named Stanley Johnstone is reported missing from his home and so is the .22 caliber rifle he was going to get for Christmas. Foul play is suspected.: This is a re-recording of the previous year's Christmas episode.
81	"The Big Family"	Ben Romero; Chief of Detectives Thad Brown; Missing Persons (Daywatch)	Saturday February 6th Foggy	December 28, 1950
A wealthy businessman in the city drops from sight. His car is found on the dock—an apparent suicide scenario—but there's no body. Friday and Romero start to search for him, but after a lot of missing persons police work, no laws are broken and the man is found just trying to get away from it all.

== 1951 season ==
No.	Title	Case Details (Partner/Boss/Department)	Background Information (Date/Weather)	Original release date
82	"The Big Holdup"	Ben Romero; Chief of Detectives Thadd Brown; Homicide (Nightwatch)	Thursday March 9th Windy	January 4, 1951
A potential killer is on the loose; he's robbed six people. Nicknamed "The Rattlesnake Bandit", he takes great pleasure in beating his victims senseless before shooting them. There's no reason at all for these senseless beatings, and he moves fast and is well armed.
83	"The Big Jump"	Ben Romero; Captain Steve; Homicide (Daywatch)	Thursday September 6th Warm	January 11, 1951
Walter Harrison crouches on the window ledge of a downtown building, thirteen stories above the street. He threatens to leap to his death within the hour.
84	"The Big Dance"	Ben Romero; Captain Harry Didian; Robbery (Nightwatch)	Sunday March 3rd Raining	January 18, 1951
For three months Friday's been tracking a pair of hold-up men, "The Kid Bandits", who are robbing and beating their victims. There is no pattern to their operation. They're young and they're brutal, but a pack of matches leads Friday to Fred Guenther.
85	"The Big Tomato"	Ben Romero; Captain Curney; Narcotics (Daywatch)	Thursday April 11th Warm	January 25, 1951
A high school boy named Kenneth Morrow is killed in an auto accident. He had been using marijuana. It looks as if a band of dope peddlers have launched a full-scale operation in the city and are selling their merchandise to high school students. Friday and the cops have to track down the man known as "The Big Tomato."
86	"The Big Children"	Ben Romero; Captain Kinslin; Juvenile (Daywatch)	Tuesday April 27th Overcast	February 1, 1951
Friday and Romero receive a complaint about an eight-year-old boy and his sister. A neighbour reports they've been going from door to door begging for food. Supposedly the children are from well to do parents. Friday and Romero investigate and find that the children's mother, Mrs. Kessler, is missing. Meanwhile, one of the children soon dies at only 22-months-old.
87	"The Big Cast"	Ben Romero; Chief of Detectives Thadd Brown; Homicide (Daywatch)	Wednesday October 6th Sultry	February 8, 1951
Twelve men drop completely from sight over a short period of time. One of them is Paul Davis. There's evidence of foul play. Four months pass before Friday and Romero finally locate the main suspect in the case. As they interview him, they realize they may have found a serial killer.
88	"The Big Crime"	Ben Romero; Inspector Bowling; Juvenile (Daywatch)	Saturday August 7th Hot	February 15, 1951
A worried mother calls the police and reports her four-year-old twins girls as missing. Hours pass and the children fail to turn up. A neighborhood search commences but soon the girls come home and reveal they have been molested. Friday and the other cops become determined to convict the sick fiend.
89	"The Big Couple"	Ben Romero; Captain McCully; Bunco (Daywatch)	Monday April 20th Windy	February 22, 1951
Mr. and Mrs. Herbert are a husband and wife confidence team specializing in victimizing churches and clergymen. Their criminal records date back 17 years and they are masters in the art of swindling. As the pair start hitting churches in LA, Friday and Romero are assigned to bring them in.
90	"The Big Partner"	Ben Romero; Captain Didian; Robbery (Daywatch)	December 2nd Chilly	March 1, 1951
A lone bandit robs a jewelry store in broad daylight and takes five thousand dollars in precious stones. The bandit is reckless and well-armed but soon gets caught by the police after causing a traffic collision during his attempted escape. Then the robber escapes from the lockup and must be recaptured again.
91	"The Big New Years"	Ben Romero; Chief of Detectives Thadd Brown; Homicide (Nightwatch)	December 31st Cold	March 8, 1951
It's New Year's Eve in Los Angeles and Friday's on special duty. Thousands of people crowd the downtown streets and one of them is a killer after a veteran cop is found murdered. Friday notifies his wife, and a club owner later identifies a drug addict as the probable suspect. The killer is convicted of manslaughter and paroled in 6 years.
92	"The Big Ben"	Ben Romero; Chief of Detectives Thadd Brown; Robbery (Daywatch)	Monday July 9th Warm	March 15, 1951
A man named Harvey Kimbrel is on his way to work when he is pulled from his car on a deserted street, robbed, and beaten viciously before his car is stolen. The criminal makes good his escape. In the course of the investigation, Friday is shot by the main suspect.: Romero takes over the narration for Friday after he is shot.; In the TV adaption of this episode "The Big Frank" it is Friday's then-partner Sergeant Frank Smith that is shot and not Friday.
93	"The Big Trunk"	Ben Romero; Captain Lohrman; Homicide (Daywatch)	Tuesday June 10th Mild	March 22, 1951
An attractive divorcée named Josephine Allen disappears from her home. She was last seen hanging up clothes in her back yard. There's no lead to her whereabouts and there's evidence of foul play.
94	"The Big Lover"	Ben Romero; Captain Steve; Bunco (Daywatch)	Wednesday February 12th Cold	March 29, 1951
For the past year a confidence man named Benton has been cheating women in LA by proposing marriage to them and then stealing their money. Mrs. Harris is the latest victim of his crime and was fleeced out of $100. She reports it to Friday and Romero who try to get a lead on him.
95	"The Big Friend"	Ben Romero; Chief of Detectives Thadd Brown; Homicide (Nightwatch)	Tuesday January 9th Rainy and Windy	April 5, 1951
A phone call comes into the police from a Mr. Gray, who tells them his wife Hazel has been murdered. He's not sure who the killer is, but when questioned he can't tell the same story twice about how it happened.
96	"The Big Threat"	Ben Romero; Captain Didian; Robbery (Daywatch)	Tuesday October 8th Overcast	April 12, 1951
A middle-aged businessman, Louis Butler, is robbed and beaten senseless. The hold-up men escape but Mr. Butler doesn't want to tell the police about it, and even refuses to report the crime because of threats against his family.
97	"The Big Speech"	Ben Romero; Chief of Detectives Thadd Brown; Robbery (Daywatch)	Monday August 7th Warm	April 19, 1951
A young narcotics addict pistol-whips a doctor leaving him in critical condition, he also steals a large quantity of narcotics from him. Meanwhile, Sergeant Friday is asked by his old high school to give a talk. After the young addict is caught, Friday delivers a speech about the use of narcotics by teenagers.: We find out in this episode that Friday lives at 1456 Collis Avenue, Los Angeles.
98	"The Big Saint"	Ben Romero; Captain Stilson; Traffic: Auto Theft (Daywatch)	Monday May 11th Fair	April 26, 1951
A well-organized ring of car thieves comes to town. A 1949 Cadillac is stolen, Friday and Romero find it at Herman Lester's salvage yard. Plus Lester's salvage business is busy but shouldn't be due to the Korean War. Friday and Romero try to break the stolen car racket.
99	"The Big Casing"	Ben Romero; Chief of Detectives Thadd Brown; Homicide (Daywatch)	Sunday March 9th Windy	May 3, 1951
Friday and Romero go to an apartment house in answer to a shooting and dead body call. The woman, Marie Robertson, has been shot dead with a .45 automatic. Her husband, Andrew, tells them it's suicide but it looks more like murder. Friday and Romero investigate the truth.
100	"The Big Drills"	Ben Romero; Captain Wisdom; Burglary (Daywatch)	Wednesday September 16th Hot	May 10, 1951
For the past eighteen weeks, a gang of safe men have been breaking into large grocery stores, the Wilson Bros Markets, all over the city. They work fast and have stolen over $100,000, and the police can't localize their operations. Friday and Romero are assigned to bring them in.
101	"The Big Blast"	Ben Romero; Chief of Detectives Thadd Brown; Homicide (Night Watch)	Monday July 9th Warm	May 17, 1951
A young mother is murdered in bed while her 7-year-old son sleeps by her side.
102	"The Big Mailman"	Ben Romero; Captain Harry Elliot; Forgery (Daywatch)	Monday March 3rd Raining	May 24, 1951
Friday and Romero partner with a US Postal Inspector to catch a mail thief in Los Angeles.
103	"The Big Bindle"	Ben Romero; Captain Curney; Narcotics (Daywatch)	Tuesday October 5th Foggy and Raining	May 31, 1951
A group of high-grade heroin traffickers come to town. Using a fake bindle (drug container) to pass himself off as a dealer looking to make a big buy, Friday tries to go undercover and infiltrate the ring.
104	"The Big Imposter"	Ben Romero; Inspector Bowling; Juvenile (Daywatch)	Wednesday August 4th Hot	June 7, 1951
A ten-year-old boy disappears from his home in a remote section of the city.
105	"The Big Building"	Ben Romero; Chief of Detectives Thadd Brown; Homicide (Daywatch)	Monday February 8th Foggy	June 14, 1951
A wealthy society woman in Los Angeles vanishes. There is suspicion of foul play.
106	"The Big Run"	Ben Romero; Captain Benny Cowell; Traffic: Accident investigation - Hit and Run Felony Detail (Daywatch)	Saturday September 5th Mild	June 21, 1951
107	"The Big Cliff"	Ben Romero; Chief of Detectives Thadd Brown; Homicide (Daywatch)	Friday November 12th Cold	June 28, 1951
108	"The Big Love"	Ben Romero; Captain Blain Steve; Homicide (Daywatch)	Tuesday April 20th Overcast	July 5, 1951
109	"The Big Set-Up"	Ben Romero; Captain Wisdom; Burglary	Wednesday January 10th Cold	July 12, 1951
110	"The Big Sophomore"	Ben Romero; Inspector Bowling; Juvenile (Nightwatch)	Tuesday February 4th Cloudy	July 19, 1951
111	"The Big Late Script"	Ben Romero; Captain Lohrman; Homicide (Nightwatch)	Wednesday October 10th Mild	July 26, 1951
112	"The Big Cop"	Ben Romero; Chief Of Detectives Thadd Brown; Burglary (Daywatch)	Tuesday May 9th Warm	August 2, 1951
113	"The Big Screen"	Ben Romero; Captain McCally; Bunco (Daywatch)	Monday January 19th Overcast	August 9, 1951
114	"The Big Winchester"	Ben Romero; Chief of Detectives Thadd Brown; Homicide (Daywatch)	Wednesday January 10th Cold	August 16, 1951
115	"The Big In-Laws"	Ben Romero; Captain Didian; Robbery (Daywatch)	Saturday November 8th Foggy	August 23, 1951
116	"The Big Crazy"	Ben Romero; Chief of Detectives Thadd Brown; Homicide (Daywatch)	Monday June 9th Warm	August 30, 1951
117	"The Big Seventeen"	Ben Romero; Captain Stien; Juvenile (Nightwatch)	Thursday April 10th Warm	September 6, 1951
118	"The Big Waiter"	Ben Romero; Chief of Detectives Thadd Brown; Homicide	Wednesday February 19th Cloudy	September 13, 1951
119	"The Big Sour"	Ben Romero; Captain Harry Didian; Robbery (Daywatch)	Saturday October 3rd Hot	September 20, 1951
120	"The Big September Man"	Ben Romero; Chief of Detectives Thadd Brown; Homicide (Nightwatch)	Wednesday September 28th Hot	September 27, 1951
121	"The Big Want Ad"	Ben Romero; Captain Nelson; Traffic: Auto Theft	Tuesday February 19th Chilly	October 4, 1951
122	"The Big Shoplift"	Ben Romero; Captain Wisdom; Burglary (Daywatch)	Tuesday August 22nd Hot	October 11, 1951
123	"The Big Story Man"	Ben Romero; Captain Wisdom; Burglary (Daywatch)	Sunday March 5th Cloudy	October 18, 1951
124	"The Big Market"	Ben Romero; Captain Didian; Robbery (Daywatch)	Tuesday September 26th Hot	October 25, 1951
125	"The Big Lease"	Ben Romero; Chief of Detectives Thadd Brown; Homicide (Daywatch)	Wednesday February 6th Cold	November 1, 1951
126	"The Big Hit and Run Killer"	Ben Romero; Captain Calfey; Traffic: Accident Investigation - Hit and Run Felony Detail (Nightwatch)	Tuesday December 21st Windy	November 8, 1951
127	"The Big Bungalow"	Ben Romero; Captain Wisdom; Burglary (Daywatch)	Monday April 16th Foggy	November 15, 1951
128	"The Big Hands"	Ben Romero; Chief of Detectives Thadd Brown; Homicide (Daywatch)	Tuesday October 26th Cold	November 22, 1951
129	"The Big Affair"	Ben Romero; Captain Didian; Robbery (Daywatch)	Wednesday March 10th Cold	November 29, 1951
130	"The Big Canaries"	Ben Romero; Chief of Detectives Thadd Brown; Homicide (Daywatch)	Tuesday February 18th Cold	December 6, 1951
131	"The Big Overtime"	Ben Romero; Chief of Detectives Thadd Brown; Homicide (Early Morning Watch)	Tuesday October 18th Cloudy	December 13, 1951
132–30	".22 Rifle for Christmas"	Ben Romero; Chief of Detectives Thadd Brown; Homicide (Nightwatch)	Thursday December 22nd Cold	December 20, 1951 (Repeated from December 21, 1950, itself a re-recording of December 22, 1949)
133	"The Big Sorrow"	Ed Jacobs; Captain Didian; Robbery (Daywatch)	Saturday April 24th Hot	December 27, 1951
Ben Romero (Barton Yarborough) passes away immediately before this episode opens. The show opens with a dedication to the memory of actor Barton Yarborough who had likewise died eight days before the episode aired.; Barney Phillips assumes the role as Joe Friday's partner, Ed Jacobs.

== 1952 season ==
No.	Title	Case Details (Partner/Boss/Department)	Background Information (Date/Weather)	Original release date
134	"The Big Red Part 1"	Ed Jacobs; Captain Curney; Narcotics (Special Detail)	Tuesday August 9th Hot	January 3, 1952
135	"The Big Red Part 2"	Ed Jacobs; Captain Curney; Narcotics (Special Detail)	Sunday August 14th Cool	January 10, 1952
136	"The Big Juvenile Division"	Ed Jacobs; Captain Lohrman; Homicide (Special Detail)	Tuesday October 14th Cloudy	January 17, 1952
137	"The Big Court"	Ed Jacobs; Captain Didian; Robbery (Daywatch)	Wednesday March 12th Cold	January 24, 1952
138	"The Big Almost No-Show"	Ed Jacobs; Captain Lohrman; Homicide (Daywatch)	Wednesday November 14th Overcast	January 31, 1952
139	"The Big Honeymoon"	Ed Jacobs; Captain Steve; Bunco*	Unknown	February 7, 1952
Due to technical difficulties at the time of its broadcast, we are not told what division Friday & Jacobs are working, but they mention that the culprit they are pursuing is a bunco suspect.
140	"The Big Phone Call"	Ed Jacobs; Captain Didan; Robbery (Daywatch)	Thursday July 18th Sultry	February 14, 1952
141	"The Big Producer"	Ed Jacobs; Captain Stien; Juvenile (Daywatch)	Wednesday November 8th Windy	February 21, 1952
142	"The Big Plant"	Ed Jacobs; Chief of Detectives Thad Brown; Homicide (Daywatch)	Wednesday September 15th Hot	February 28, 1952
The episode is a remake of Episode 14 "Eric Kelby - Buried Body in Nursery" with new names, and Ed Jacobs as Joe's partner.
143	"The Big Evans"	Ed Jacobs; Lieutenant Jesop; Personnel (Daywatch)	Tuesday June 11th Mild	March 6, 1952
144	"The Big Fire"	Ed Jacobs; Captain Lohrman; Homicide (Nightwatch)	Wednesday May 9th Hot	March 13, 1952
145	"The Big Border"	Ed Jacobs; Captain Didian; Robbery (Daywatch)	Wednesday October 6th Cloudy	March 20, 1952
146	"The Big Rose"	Ed Jacobs; Chief of Detectives Thad Brown; Homicide (Daywatch)	Monday June 3rd Overcast	March 27, 1952
147	"The Big Streetcar"	Ed Jacobs; Chief of Detectives Thad Brown; Homicide (Nightwatch)	Thursday January 20th Mild	April 3, 1952
148	"The Big Show"	Ed Jacobs; Captain Stien; Juvenile (Daywatch)	Wednesday August 14th Hot	April 10, 1952
149	"The Big Bunco"	Bill Lockwood * Captain Steve; Bunco (Daywatch)	Tuesday September 9th	April 17, 1952
Ed Jacobs becomes an instructor for the police academy, and Ben Romero's nephew, Officer Bill Lockwood (Note: Martin Milner portrayed Bill Lockwood in Episodes 149, 150, and 152. Ken Peters would portray Bill in episode 157. Ken Patterson portrayed Bill in his only television episode.) (Martin Milner), becomes Joe's new partner for the next few episodes.
150	"The Big Elevator"	Bill Lockwood; Captain Lohrman; Homicide (Nightwatch)	Wednesday November 9th Foggy	April 24, 1952
151	"The Big Safe"	Frank Smith; Captain Wisdom; Burglary-Safe Detail (Daywatch)	Sunday June 8th Warm	May 1, 1952
Bill Lockwood is out with a sprained ankle, and Frank Smith (Note: Frank Smith would be portrayed by several actors in the radio series: Harry Bartell - Episode 151, Herb Ellis - Episodes 153-156 and 165-169, Vic Perrin - Episodes 158-163, Ken Patterson Episode 164, Ben Alexander Episodes 170-318. Herb Ellis and Ben Alexander would also portray Frank in the 1951-1958 television series.) works with Joe, portrayed by Harry Bartell.
152	"The Big Gamble"	Bill Lockwood; Lieutenant Bingham; Vice (Daywatch)	Monday February 9th Foggy	May 8, 1952
153	"The Big Mail"	Frank Smith; Captain Didian; Robbery (Nightwatch)	Monday August 4th	May 15, 1952
Friday and new partner Frank Smith are after a trio of robbers who hijacked a Registered Mail truck for its cash. Actor Herb Ellis takes over as Frank Smith for four episodes.: This case marks the second appearance of Frank Smith, who would be Joe's partner for the rest of the radio series
154	"The Big Shakedown"	Frank Smith; Captain Hayes; Vice (Daywatch)	Tuesday October 18th Hot	May 22, 1952
155	"The Big Fourth"	Frank Smith; Captain Stien; Juvenile (Daywatch)	Wednesday June 18th Warm	May 29, 1952
156	"The Big Whiff"	Frank Smith; Captain Lohrman; Homicide (Nightwatch)	Thursday October 16th Cloudy	June 5, 1952
157	"The Big Donation"	Bill Lockwood; Captain Steve; Bunco (Daywatch)	Tuesday February 16th Cold	June 12, 1952
Ken Peters portrays Bill Lockwood instead of Martin Milner.
158	"The Big Jules"	Frank Smith; Captain Curney; Narcotics (Daywatch)	Thursday October 8th Hot	June 19, 1952
Vic Perrin takes over as Frank Smith for six episodes.
159	"The Big Roll"	Frank Smith; Captain Lohrman; Homicide (Nightwatch)	Monday March 18th Overcast	June 26, 1952
160	"The Big Trio"	Frank Smith; Deputy Chief Coldwell; Traffic: Accident Investigation (Nightwatch)	Thursday July 3rd Warm	July 3, 1952
161	"The Big Hate"	Frank Smith; Captain Lohrman; Homicide (Nightwatch)	Tuesday January 18th Cold	July 10, 1952
162	"The Big Signet"	Frank Smith; Captain Didian; Robbery (Daywatch)	Monday June 2nd Smoggy	July 31, 1952
163	"The Big Impression"	Frank Smith; Captain Didan; Robbery (Daywatch)	Tuesday July 12th Hot	August 7, 1952
164	"The Big Drive"	Frank Smith; Captain Lohrman; Homicide (Daywatch)	Wednesday February 6th Cold	August 14, 1952
Ken Patterson portrays Frank Smith in this episode.
165	"The Big Paper"	Frank Smith; Chief of Detectives Thad Brown; Forgery (Daywatch)	Tuesday July 22nd Hot	August 21, 1952
Herb Ellis returns to the role of Frank Smith for five more episodes.
166	"The Big Test"	Frank Smith; Captain Lohrman; Homicide (Daywatch)	Monday August 9th Warm	August 28, 1952
167	"The Big Ray"	Frank Smith; Chief of Detectives Thad Brown; Homicide (Nightwatch)	Wednesday September 4th Warm	September 4, 1952
168	"The Big Tear"	Frank Smith; Captain Wisdom; Burglary (Daywatch)	Tuesday July 10th Hot	September 11, 1952
169	"The Big Bull"	Frank Smith; Captain Didian; Robbery (Daywatch)	Tuesday March 6th Windy	September 14, 1952
170	"The Big Shot"	Frank Smith; Chief of Detectives Thad Brown; Homicide (Daywatch)	Wednesday April 7th Warm	September 21, 1952
Ben Alexander takes over the role of Frank Smith and will remain for the rest of the radio series.
171	"The Big Brain"	Frank Smith; Chief of Detectives Thad Brown; Robbery (Daywatch)	Wednesday February 18th Raining	September 28, 1952
172	"The Big Jolt"	Frank Smith; Captain Stien; Juvenile (Daywatch)	Wednesday October 3rd Warm	October 5, 1952
173	"The Big Lie"	Frank Smith; Captain Lohrman; Homicide (Daywatch)	Saturday May 12th Warm	October 12, 1952
174	"The Big Pill"	Frank Smith; Captain Lohrman; Homicide (Daywatch)	Tuesday July 10th Hot	October 19, 1952
175	"The Big Number"	Frank Smith; Captain Didian; Robbery (Daywatch)	Monday January 21st Cold	October 26, 1952
176	"The Big Light"	Frank Smith; Captain Lohrman; Homicide (Daywatch)	Friday August 5th Warm	November 2, 1952
177	"The Big Dive"	Frank Smith; Chief of Detectives Thad Brown; Homicide (Daywatch)	Thursday April 17th Warm	November 9, 1952
178	"The Big Walk"	Frank Smith; Captain Curney; Narcotics (Daywatch)	Tuesday August 3rd Warm	November 16, 1952
179	"The Big Guilt"	Frank Smith; Chief of Detectives Thad Brown; Homicide	Sunday February 10th Cold	November 23, 1952
180	"The Big Shirt"	Frank Smith; Captain Lohrman; Homicide (Daywatch)	Monday July 5th Hot	November 30, 1952
181	"The Big Mole"	Frank Smith; Captain Wisdom; Burglary (Daywatch)	Wednesday January 23rd Cold	December 7, 1952
182	"The Big Eavesdrop"	Frank Smith; Captain Curney; Narcotics (Nightwatch)	Tuesday April 8th Windy	December 14, 1952
183	".22 Rifle for Christmas"	Frank Smith; Captain Lohrman; Homicide (Nightwatch)	Thursday December 22nd Cold	December 21, 1952
A new recording of the same story aired in the past 3 Christmases, with Frank Smith as Joe's partner.
184	"The Big Mask Part 1"	Frank Smith; Captain Didian; Robbery (Daywatch)	Thursday February 7th Raining	December 28, 1952

== 1953 season ==
No.	Title	Case Details (Partner/Boss/Department)	Background Information (Date/Weather)	Original release date
185	"The Big Mask Part 2"	Frank Smith; Captain Didian; Robbery (Daywatch)	Saturday March 22nd Cold	January 4, 1953
186	"The Big Small"	Frank Smith; Captain Welsh; Forgery (Daywatch)	Wednesday February 6th Cool	January 11, 1953
187	"The Big String"	Frank Smith; Chief of Detectives Thad Brown; Homicide (Nightwatch)	Tuesday July 7th Hot	January 18, 1953
188	"The Big Lay-Out"	Frank Smith; Captain Curney; Narcotics (Daywatch)	Tuesday April 6th Warm	January 25, 1953
Joe's friend confesses that his teenage son is a heroin addict.
189	"The Big Strip"	Frank Smith; Captain Nelson; Traffic: Auto Theft (Daywatch)	Tuesday August 5th Warm	February 1, 1953
190	"The Big Press"	Frank Smith; Captain Welsh; Forgery (Daywatch)	Thursday April 8th Windy	February 8, 1953
191	"The Big Tooth"	Frank Smith; Chief of Detectives Thad Brown; Robbery (Nightwatch)	Sunday October 9th Cool	February 15, 1953
192	"The Big Smoke"	Frank Smith; Chief of Detectives Thad Brown; Homicide (Daywatch)	Tuesday August 12th Warm	February 22, 1953
193	"The Big Want"	Frank Smith; Captain Steed; Bunco Fugitive Detail (Daywatch)	Tuesday June 4th Hot	March 1, 1953
194	"The Big Laugh"	Frank Smith; Captain Steed; Bunco Fugitive Detail (Daywatch)	Wednesday February 12th Cold	March 8, 1953
195	"The Big Impossible"	Frank Smith; Captain Didion; Robbery (Daywatch)	Monday July 7th Warm	March 15, 1953
196	"The Big Informant"	Frank Smith; Captain Wisdom; Burglary (Daywatch)	Tuesday August 10th Warm	March 22, 1953
197	"The Big Dream"	Frank Smith; Captain Didion; Robbery (Daywatch)	Monday March 10th Raining	March 29, 1953
198	"The Big Chet"	Frank Smith; Captain Didion; Robbery (Daywatch)	Tuesday September 6th Warm	April 5, 1953
199	"The Big Compulsion"	Frank Smith; Captain Didion; Robbery (Daywatch)	Wednesday May 6th Warm	April 12, 1953
200	"The Big Rip"	Frank Smith; Chief of Detectives Thad Brown; Burglary (Daywatch)	Tuesday August 18th Warm	April 19, 1953
201	"The Big Scrapbook"	Frank Smith; Captain Didion; Robbery (Nightwatch)	Monday October 5th Warm	April 26, 1953
202	"The Big Carney"	Frank Smith; Chief of Detectives Thad Brown; Burglary (Daywatch)	Thursday December 10th Cold	May 3, 1953
203	"The Big Joke"	Frank Smith; Captain Lohrman; Homicide (Daywatch)	Monday February 9th Cold	May 10, 1953
204	"The Big False Make"	Frank Smith; Captain Didion; Robbery (Daywatch)	Wednesday June 3rd Hot	May 17, 1953
205	"The Big Gun Part 1"	Frank Smith; Captain Nelson; Traffic: Auto Theft (Daywatch)	Monday April 12th Warm	May 24, 1953
206	"The Big Gun Part 2"	Frank Smith; Chief of Detectives Thad Brown; Traffic: Auto Theft (Daywatch)	Wednesday June 24th	May 31, 1953
207	"The Big Will"	Frank Smith; Captain Lohrman; Homicide (Nightwatch)	Sunday April 26th Raining	June 7, 1953
208	"The Big Lilly"	Frank Smith; Captain Lohrman; Homicide (Nightwatch)	Friday June 10th Hot	June 14, 1953
209	"The Big Revolt"	Frank Smith; Chief of Detectives Thad Brown; Missing Persons (Nightwatch)	Tuesday June 16th Warm	June 21, 1953
210	"The Big Ham"	Frank Smith; Captain Lohrman; Homicide (Daywatch)	Monday June 8th Warm	June 28, 1953
211	"The Big Bop"	Frank Smith; Captain Donahoe; Robbery (Daywatch)	Friday June 10th Warm	September 1, 1953
212	"The Big Lift"	Frank Smith; Captain Wisdom; Burglary (Daywatch)	Wednesday June 3rd Hot	September 8, 1953
213	"The Big Cab"	Frank Smith; Chief of Detectives Thad Brown; Robbery (Daywatch)	Wednesday February 18th Raining	September 15, 1953
214	"The Big Slip"	Frank Smith; Captain Nelson; Traffic: Auto Theft (Daywatch)	Monday May 4th Warm	September 22, 1953
215	"The Big Try"	Frank Smith; Captain Lohrman; Homicide (Daywatch)	Wednesday November 18th Cold	September 29, 1953
216	"The Big Little Mother"	Frank Smith; Captain Welsh; Forgery (Daywatch)	Friday September 18th Warm	October 6, 1953
217	"The Big Plea"	Frank Smith; Chief of Detectives Thad Brown; Robbery (Daywatch)	Tuesday April 14th Warm	October 13, 1953
218	"The Big Paint"	Frank Smith; Captain Nelson; Traffic: Auto Theft (Daywatch)	Tuesday June 13th Overcast	October 20, 1953
219	"The Big Fraud"	Frank Smith; Captain Didian; Bunco Fugitive Detail (Daywatch)	Tuesday August 10th Warm	October 27, 1953
220	"The Big Rain"	Frank Smith; Captain Lohrman; Homicide (Nightwatch)	Tuesday November 17th Raining	November 3, 1953
221	"The Big Kid"	Frank Smith; Captain Powers; Juvenile (Nightwatch)	Tuesday September 8th Warm	November 10, 1953
222	"The Big Flight"	Frank Smith; Chief of Detectives Thad Brown; Robbery (Daywatch)	Tuesday November 3rd Cold	November 17, 1953
223	"The Big Present"	Frank Smith; Captain Bernard; Burglary (Daywatch)	Monday December 14th Cold	November 24, 1953
224	"The Big Odd"	Frank Smith; Chief of Detectives Thad Brown; Robbery (Daywatch)	Wednesday June 4th Warm	December 1, 1953
225	"The Big Pick"	Frank Smith; Captain Didian; Bunco Fugitive Pickpocket Detail (Daywatch)	Tuesday May 10th N/A	December 8, 1953
226	"The Big Brink"	Frank Smith; Chief of Detectives Thad Brown; Robbery (Nightwatch)	Thursday June 5th Warm	December 15, 1953
227	"The Big Little Jesus"	Frank Smith; Captain Bernard; Burglary (Daywatch)	Wednesday December 24th Cold	December 22, 1953
228	"The Big Steal"	Frank Smith; Captain Bernard; Burglary (Daywatch)	Tuesday May 7th Warm	December 29, 1953

== 1954 season ==
No.	Title	Original release date	
229	"The Big Listen"	January 5, 1954	1954-01-05
230	"The Big Switch"	January 12, 1954	1954-01-12
231	"The Big Bill"	January 19, 1954	1954-01-19
232	"The Big Bid"	January 26, 1954	1954-01-26
233	"The Big Filth"	February 2, 1954	1954-02-02
234	"The Big Broad"	February 9, 1954	1954-02-09
235	"The Big Sucker"	February 16, 1954	1954-02-16
236	"The Big Pipe"	February 23, 1954	1954-02-23
237	"The Big TV"	March 2, 1954	1954-03-02
238	"The Big Cup"	March 9, 1954	1954-03-09
239	"The Big Rod"	March 16, 1954	1954-03-16
240	"The Big Mustache"	March 23, 1954	1954-03-23
241	"The Big Confession"	March 30, 1954	1954-03-30
242	"The Big Saw"	April 6, 1954	1954-04-06
243	"The Big Note"	April 13, 1954	1954-04-13
244	"The Big Net"	April 20, 1954	1954-04-20
245	"The Big Lift"	April 27, 1954	1954-04-27
246	"The Big Stop"	May 4, 1954	1954-05-04
247	"The Big Look"	May 11, 1954	1954-05-11
248	"The Big Help"	May 18, 1954	1954-05-18
249	"The Big Watch"	May 25, 1954	1954-05-25
250	"The Big Cowboy"	June 1, 1954	1954-06-01
251	"The Big Student"	June 8, 1954	1954-06-08
252	"The Big Cat"	June 15, 1954	1954-06-15
253	"The Big Customer"	June 22, 1954	1954-06-22
254	"The Big Chick"	June 29, 1954	1954-06-29
255	"The Big Search"	July 6, 1954	1954-07-06
256	"The Big Rescue"	July 13, 1954	1954-07-13
257	"The Big Heel"	July 20, 1954	1954-07-20
258	"The Big Match"	July 27, 1954	1954-07-27
259	"The Big Stand"	August 3, 1954	1954-08-03
260	"The Big Wish"	August 10, 1954	1954-08-10
261	"The Big Cad"	August 17, 1954	1954-08-17
262	"The Big Shock"	August 24, 1954	1954-08-24
263	"The Big Office"	August 31, 1954	1954-08-31
264	"The Big Trunk"	September 7, 1954	1954-09-07
265	"The Big Cut"	September 14, 1954	1954-09-14
266	"The Big Try"	September 21, 1954	1954-09-21
267	"The Big Bible"	September 28, 1954	1954-09-28
268	"The Big Handsome Bandit"	October 5, 1954	1954-10-05
269	"The Big Tar Baby"	October 12, 1954	1954-10-12
270	"The Big Mannequin"	October 19, 1954	1954-10-19
271	"The Big Key"	October 26, 1954	1954-10-26
272	"The Big Locker"	November 2, 1954	1954-11-02
273	"The Big Coins"	November 9, 1954	1954-11-09
274	"The Big Dog"	November 16, 1954	1954-11-16
275	"The Big Switch"	November 23, 1954	1954-11-23
276	"The Big Gone"	November 30, 1954	1954-11-30
277	"The Big Dig"	December 7, 1954	1954-12-07
278	"The Big Lens"	December 14, 1954	1954-12-14
279–227	"The Big Little Jesus"	December 22, 1953	1954-12-21
280	"The Big Underground"	December 28, 1954	1954-12-28

== 1955 season ==
No.	Title	Original release date	
281	"The Big Mug"	January 4, 1955	1955-01-04
282	"The Big Complex"	January 11, 1955	1955-01-11
283	"The Big Token"	January 18, 1955	1955-01-18
284	"The Big Bounce"	January 25, 1955	1955-01-25
285	"The Big Bird"	February 1, 1955	1955-02-01
286	"The Big Gap"	February 8, 1955	1955-02-08
287	"The Big Hat"	February 15, 1955	1955-02-15
288	"The Big Slug"	February 22, 1955	1955-02-22
289	"The Big Set-Up"	March 1, 1955	1955-03-01
290	"The Big Father"	March 8, 1955	1955-03-08
291	"The Big Set"	March 15, 1955	1955-03-15
292	"The Big Talk"	March 22, 1955	1955-03-22
293	"The Big Death"	March 29, 1955	1955-03-29
294	"The Big No Tooth"	April 5, 1955	1955-04-05
295	"The Big Tie"	April 12, 1955	1955-04-12
296	"The Big Deal"	April 19, 1955	1955-04-19
297	"The Big Child"	April 26, 1955	1955-04-26
298	"The Big Momma"	May 3, 1955	1955-05-03
299	"The Big Revision"	May 10, 1955	1955-05-10
300	"The Big Squealer"	May 17, 1955	1955-05-17
301	"The Big Siege"	May 24, 1955	1955-05-24
302	"The Big Sisters"	May 31, 1955	1955-05-31
303	"The Big Limp"	June 7, 1955	1955-06-07
304	"The Big Fall Guy"	June 14, 1955	1955-06-14
305	"The Big Grab"	June 21, 1955	1955-06-21
306	"The Big Convertible"	June 28, 1955	1955-06-28
307	"The Big Rush"	July 5, 1955	1955-07-05
308	"The Big Genius"	July 12, 1955	1955-07-12
309	"The Big Bobo"	July 19, 1955	1955-07-19
310	"The Big Housemaid"	July 26, 1955	1955-07-26
311	"The Big Sheet"	August 2, 1955	1955-08-02
312	"The Big Missus"	August 9, 1955	1955-08-09
313	"The Big Beer"	August 16, 1955	1955-08-16
314	"The Big Blonde"	August 23, 1955	1955-08-23
315	"The Big Fellow"	August 30, 1955	1955-08-30
316	"The Big Ruling"	September 6, 1955	1955-09-06
317	"The Big Daughter"	September 13, 1955	1955-09-13
318	"The Big Close"	September 20, 1955	1955-09-20
170	"The Big Shot"	September 21, 1952	1955-09-27
171	"The Big Brain"	September 28, 1952	1955-10-04
172	"The Big Jolt"	October 5, 1952	1955-10-11
173	"The Big Lie"	October 12, 1952	1955-10-18
174	"The Big Pill"	October 19, 1952	1955-10-25
175	"The Big Number"	October 26, 1952	1955-11-01
176	"The Big Light"	November 2, 1952	1955-11-08
177	"The Big Dive"	November 9, 1952	1955-11-15
178	"The Big Walk"	November 16, 1952	1955-11-22
179	"The Big Guilt"	November 23, 1952	1955-11-29
180	"The Big Shirt"	November 30, 1952	1955-12-06
181	"The Big Mole"	December 7, 1952	1955-12-13
30	".22 Rifle for Christmas"	December 22, 1949	1955-12-20
184	"The Big Mask Part 1"	December 28, 1952	1955-12-27

== 1956 season ==
No.	Title	Original release date	
185	"The Big Mask Part 2"	January 4, 1953	1956-01-03
186	"The Big Small"	January 11, 1953	1956-01-10
187	"The Big String"	January 18, 1953	1956-01-17
188	"The Big Lay-Out"	January 25, 1953	1956-01-24
189	"The Big Strip"	February 1, 1953	1956-01-31
190	"The Big Press"	February 8, 1953	1956-02-07
191	"The Big Tooth"	February 15, 1953	1956-02-14
192	"The Big Smoke"	February 22, 1953	1956-02-21
193	"The Big Want"	March 1, 1953	1956-02-28
194	"The Big Laugh"	March 8, 1953	1956-03-06
195	"The Big Impossible"	March 15, 1953	1956-03-13
30	".22 Rifle for Christmas"	December 22, 1949	1956-03-20
196	"The Big Informant"	March 22, 1953	1956-03-27
197	"The Big Dream"	March 29, 1953	1956-04-03
198	"The Big Chet"	April 5, 1953	1956-04-10
199	"The Big Compulsion"	April 12, 1953	1956-04-17
200	"The Big Rip"	April 19, 1953	1956-04-24
201	"The Big Scrapbook"	April 26, 1953	1956-05-01
202	"The Big Carney"	May 3, 1953	1956-05-08
203	"The Big Joke"	May 10, 1953	1956-05-15
204	"The Big False Move"	May 17, 1953	1956-05-22
205	"The Big Gun Part 1"	May 24, 1953	1956-05-29
206	"The Big Gun Part 2"	May 31, 1953	1956-06-05
207	"The Big Will"	June 7, 1953	1956-06-12
208	"The Big Lilly"	June 14, 1953	1956-06-19
209	"The Big Revolt"	June 21, 1953	1956-06-26
210	"The Big Ham"	June 28, 1953	1956-09-18
211	"The Big Bop"	September 1, 1953	1956-09-25
212	"The Big Lift"	September 8, 1953	1956-10-02
213	"The Big Cab"	September 15, 1953	1956-10-09
214	"The Big Slip"	September 22, 1953	1956-10-16
215	"The Big Try"	September 29, 1953	1956-10-23
223	"The Big Present"	November 24, 1953	1956-10-30
224	"The Big Odd"	December 1, 1953	1956-11-06
225	"The Big Pick"	December 8, 1953	1956-11-13
226	"The Big Brink"	December 15, 1953	1956-11-20
228	"The Big Steal"	December 29, 1953	1956-11-27
229	"The Big Listen"	January 5, 1954	1956-12-04
230	"The Big Switch"	January 12, 1954	1956-12-11
231	"The Big Bill"	January 19, 1954	1956-12-18
227	"The Big Little Jesus"	December 22, 1953	1956-12-25

== 1957 season ==
No.	Title	Original release date	
232	"The Big Bid"	January 26, 1954	1957-01-01
233	"The Big Filth"	February 2, 1954	1957-01-08
234	"The Big Broad"	February 9, 1954	1957-01-15
235	"The Big Sucker"	February 16, 1954	1957-01-22
236	"The Big Pipe"	February 23, 1954	1957-01-29
237	"The Big TV"	March 2, 1954	1957-02-05
238	"The Big Cup"	March 9, 1954	1957-02-12
239	"The Big Rod"	March 16, 1954	1957-02-19
240	"The Big Mustache"	March 23, 1954	1957-02-26

== Sources ==
- John Dunning, On The Air: The Encyclopedia of Old-Time Radio, Oxford University Press, 1998, ISBN 0-19-507678-8.
