= The Hearts of Age =

- The full film
- Directed by: Orson Welles; William Vance
- Written by: Orson Welles
- Starring: Orson Welles; Virginia Nicolson; William Vance; Edgerton Paul; Blackie O'Neal
- Release date: 1934
- Running time: 8 minutes
- Country: United States
- Language: Silent film

The Hearts of Age is an early film made by Orson Welles. The film is an eight-minute short that he co-directed with friend William Vance in 1934. The film stars Welles's first wife, Virginia Nicolson, and Welles himself. He made the film at his former school, the Todd School for Boys in Woodstock, Illinois, at the age of 19.

== Plot ==
An elderly woman sits on a bell as it rocks back and forth, while a servant in blackface pulls at a rope. A dandified gentleman appears at the top of a stairway and doffs his hat to the lady; he smiles and courts her attention. She does not respond, but the servant hangs himself. The scene changes to a darkened interior: the gentleman sits at a grand piano and plays, but something is wrong. He opens the piano's lid and finds the woman lying inside, dead. He leafs through a number of tombstone-shaped cards with different inscriptions - "Sleeping", "At Rest", "With The Lord" - and finally chooses one that says "The End".

== Cast ==
- Orson Welles as Death
- Virginia Nicolson as the Old Woman/Keystone Kop
- William Vance as the Indian in blanket
- Edgerton Paul as the Bell-ringer in blackface
- Blackie O'Neal

== Background ==
The film's action, such as it is, is intercut with random shots of bells, headstones, a church cross and other images, sometimes printed in negative. Many years later Welles acknowledged that the film was an imitation of the early surrealist films of Luis Buñuel and Jean Cocteau. He did not consider it a serious piece of work, and was amused at the idea of its being added to his creative canon.

Many point to The Hearts of Age as an important precursor to Welles's first Hollywood film, Citizen Kane. Welles and Vance were college friends. The latter's only other film on record is another student short – an adaptation of Dr. Jekyll and Mr. Hyde in 1932.

Cast member Charles "Blackie" O'Neal became a screenwriter (The Seventh Victim) and the father of actor Ryan O'Neal.

== Rediscovery ==
Vance kept the original copy of The Hearts of Age, and he eventually donated it to the Greenwich Public Library (Connecticut) as a part of the Vance Collection. Acting on a tip from University of Wisconsin film Professor Russell Merritt, film historian Joseph McBride rediscovered the film in the late 1960s. McBride announced his discovery in the Spring 1970 issue of Film Quarterly in an article, entitled “Welles Before Kane." In McBride's later book, What Ever Happened to Orson Welles: A Portrait of an Independent Career, he stated that “Welles seemed bemused and somewhat irritated by the discovery" of The Hearts of Age, quoting Gary Graver, Welles’ longtime cinematographer: "Orson kept saying, "Why did Joe have to discover that film?"

The American Film Institute eventually preserved the 16mm copy and deposited a print in the Library of Congress.

== Home media ==
The Hearts of Age is a home movie and no copyright was ever filed. The film is in the public domain. The once-rare film is easily seen today thanks to DVD extras and sites such as YouTube.

The film was released by Kino on the first DVD in its Avant Garde series, Avant-Garde: Experimental Cinema of the 1920s and '30s (August 2, 2005, UPC 738329040222). The DVD was produced from the film holdings of the Raymond Rohauer Collection by Bret Wood.
