= Hawk Larabee =

Radio program

- Other names: Hawk Durango
- Genre: Western
- Running time: 30 minutes
- Country of origin: United States
- Language(s): English
- Syndicates: CBS
- Starring: Elliott Lewis; Barton Yarborough; Barney Phillips
- Announcer: James Matthews
- Written by: Gomer Cool; E. Jack Neuman; Arthur E. Orlock; Dean Owen; Kenneth Perkins
- Directed by: William N. Robson; Richard Sanville
- Produced by: William N. Robson
- Original release: July 5, 1946 – February 7, 1948

Hawk Larabee is an American old-time radio western. It was broadcast on CBS from July 5, 1946, until February 7, 1948.

== Format ==
In his book, On the Air: The Encyclopedia of Old-Time Radio, radio historian John Dunning described Hawk Larabee as "radio's first half-hearted attempt at an adult western drama, a concept that was not fully realized until the arrival of Gunsmoke five years later." Although adults listened to earlier radio westerns, such as The Lone Ranger and Red Ryder, the main audience for those programs was children. Another radio historian, Jim Cox, wrote in his book, Say Goodnight, Gracie: The Last Years of Network Radio, that Hawk Larabee "fell short in providing the stark realism of a grown-up narrative."

A summer replacement for The Adventures of Maisie, the program began as Hawk Durango, with the main character having that name. Those episodes focused on the adventures of Durango and his partner, Brazos John. After six weeks, the program ended. On October 3, 1946, Hawk Larabee debuted, with the title character being the owner of Black Mesa Ranch. Larabee and his partner, Somber Jones, encountered adventures in and around the town of Sundown Wells. Larabee often found himself accused of crimes that he had not committed and thus had to solve the crimes to save himself from misfortune.

== Personnel ==
The changes in title and format were accompanied by a change in who had the title role. Elliott Lewis played Hawk Durango, with Barton Yarborough as Brazos John. In the Hawk Larabee program, Yarborough played the title role, while Barney Phillips portrayed Somber Jones. James Matthews was the announcer. William N. Robson was producer and director, and Richard Sanville was assistant director. Writers were Gomer Cool, E. Jack Neuman, Arthur E. Orlock, Dean Owen, and Kenneth Perkins.

Music was by Wilbur Hatch, and episodes incorporated singing by the Texas Rangers quartet. They sang the theme and provided bridges and background music for the broadcasts. Each episode also included three one-minute arrangements of songs in case some local stations wanted to insert commercials for the otherwise unsponsored program. In later episodes, Andy Parker's Plainsmen replaced the Texas Rangers.
