= The Unknown (1946 film) =

1946 film by Henry Levin

- Directed by: Henry Levin
- Written by: Carlton E. Morse; Charles O'Neal; Dwight V. Babcock
- Based on: radio play Faith, Hope and Charity Sisters; 1939--1944; 1947--1952 radio series by Malcolm Stuart Boylan; Julian Harmon
- Produced by: Wallace MacDonald
- Starring: Karen Morley; Jim Bannon; Jeff Donnell
- Narrated by: Frank Martin
- Cinematography: Henry Freulich
- Edited by: Arthur Seid
- Color process: Black and white
- Production company: Columbia Pictures
- Distributed by: Columbia Pictures
- Release date: 1946
- Running time: 71 minutes
- Country: United States
- Language: English

The Unknown is a 1946 American horror mystery film directed by Henry Levin made by Columbia Pictures as the third and final part of its I Love a Mystery series based on the popular radio program. The previous films were I Love a Mystery (1945) and The Devil's Mask (1946).

The film is a loose adaptation of the I Love a Mystery radio episode Faith, Hope, and Charity, Sisters, which was remade in a later version of the radio series, in '49, as The Thing That Cries in the Night, starring Russell Thorson, Jim Boles, and Tony Randall as the private detectives, and Mercedes MacCambridge as the stewardess and Cherry (Charity).

== Plot ==
In a grand Kentucky mansion, Captain Selby Martin and his wife Phoebe discover their daughter Rachel has been secretly married to Richard Arnold, although they want Rachel to be engaged to James Wetherford. Selby and Richard fight, and Selby is accidentally killed. Phoebe arranges for her husband to be buried in a crypt by their sons Ralph and Edward, and refuses to allow Rachel to marry Richard. Rachel becomes mentally unbalanced and gives birth to a baby girl who Phoebe has raised by others

Years later the baby girl, now a grown woman called Nina, returns home for the reading of Phoebe's will. She is accompanied by two detectives, Doc and Jack. Nina discovers Rachel has gone mad, and Ralph and Edward are resentful to her. The will goes missing which means the estate goes to Ralph, Edward and Rachel.

A series of mysterious incidents happen: someone pushes Nina down the stairs, Jack and Doc are locked up, Edward's murdered body is discovered in the crypt and Richard arrives. Phoebe appears, revealing she faked her death to bring Rachel, Richard and Nina together. Phoebe is then killed.

It is revealed that the killer of Edward and Phoebe was Ralph, who hates his family. Nina inherits the estate and watches as her parents Rachel and Richard are reunited.

== Cast ==
- Rachel Martin Arnold – Karen Morley
- Jack Packard – Jim Bannon
- Nina Arnold – Jeff Donnell
- Reed Cawthorne – Mark Roberts
- Richard Arnold – Robert Wilcox
- Doc Long – Barton Yarborough
- Edward Martin – James Bell
- Ralph Martin – Wilton Graff
- Phoebe Martin – Helen Freeman
- Joshua - J. Louis Johnson

== Production ==
It is also known as The Coffin. Filming stated in April 1946.

== Critical reception ==
Variety wrote the film was an "effective spine-tingling fare for the horror hounds. < All the usual scarifying gimmicks are thrown into the works including an antique mansion with subterranean passageways, elemented inmates, a hooded shadow, and a couple of stabbings. Accent in the pic is less on -the whodunit elements than on an out-and-out attempt to shock the patrons into frightened squeals."

TV Guide gave the film two out of five stars, describing it as "filled with all the things that are guaranteed to make audiences jump out of their seats, such as hidden passageways, a hooded grave robber, eerie shadows, and mysterious killings".
