= The Devil's Mask =

1946 film by Henry Levin

- Directed by: Henry Levin
- Written by: Charles O'Neal; Dwight V. Babcock
- Based on: I Love a Mystery; 1939-52 radio series by Carlton E. Morse
- Produced by: Wallace MacDonald
- Starring: Anita Louise; Jim Bannon; Michael Duane; Mona Barrie
- Narrated by: Frank Martin
- Cinematography: Henry Freulich
- Edited by: Jerome Thoms
- Music by: George Duning; Irving Gertz
- Production company: Columbia Pictures
- Distributed by: Columbia Pictures
- Release date: May 23, 1946
- Running time: 65 minutes
- Country: United States
- Language: English

The Devil's Mask is a 1946 American crime film directed by Henry Levin and starring Anita Louise, Jim Bannon and Michael Duane.The film was the second of three B pictures based on the popular radio series I Love a Mystery. As well as its crime theme, the film also incorporates elements of horror. It was preceded by I Love a Mystery, and followed by The Unknown.

== Plot ==
Police find a shrunken head in the wreckage of a plane crash. Capt. Quinn of the San Francisco police department visits a local museum to see if any heads are missing from its collection and meet private detectives Jack and Doc. They are meeting Mrs. Louise Mitchell, the wife of museum director Quentin Mitchell, who recently disappeared while on an expedition in South America. Louise is worried a man called Rex Kennedy has been following her and wants to kill her with her stepdaugter Janet.

Janet believes Louise is romantically involved with Arthur Logan, an associate of her father, and that the two conspired to murder her father in the jungle.

Jack and Doc visit the Mitchell house and meet Logan, who shows slides of an expedition in South America. Quinn exposes Rex as a gamber and conman. Rex makes Janet to visit Dr Krager who hynpotises Janet.

Hartman reveals he killed Jayne's father in South America.

== Cast ==
- Anita Louise as Janet Mitchell
- Jim Bannon as Jack Packard
- Michael Duane as Rex Kennedy
- Mona Barrie as Louise Mitchell
- Barton Yarborough as Doc Long
- Ludwig Donath as Dr. Karger
- Paul E. Burns as Leon Hartman
- Frank Wilcox as Prof. Arthur Logan
- Bud Averill as Museum Guard
- Edward Earle as E.R. Willard
- John Elliott as John the Butler
- Fred Godoy as Mendoza
- Richard Hale as Curator Raymond Halliday
- Coulter Irwin as Frank
- Thomas E. Jackson as Detective Captain Quinn
- Frank Mayo as Gordon R. Mitchell
- Mary Newton as Karger's Nurse
- Harry Strang as Brophy - Night Watchman

== Production ==
Filming took place in February 1946.

== Critical reception ==
Daily News called it "a gory little number."

TV Guide called it an "enjoyable programmer".

== Bibliography ==
- Bansak, Edmund G. Fearing the Dark: The Val Lewton Career. McFarland, 2003.
- Sterling, Christopher H. & O'Dell, Cary. The Concise Encyclopedia of American Radio. Routledge, 2011.
