= I Love a Mystery (film) =

1945 film by Henry Levin

- Directed by: Henry Levin
- Screenplay by: Charles O'Neal
- Based on: I Love a Mystery; 1939-52 radio series by Carlton E. Morse episode "The Decapitation of Jonathan Monk"
- Produced by: Wallace MacDonald
- Starring: George Macready; Jim Bannon; Nina Foch
- Cinematography: Burnett Guffey
- Edited by: Aaron Stell
- Production company: Columbia Pictures
- Distributed by: Columbia Pictures
- Release date: January 25, 1945
- Running time: 69 minutes
- Country: United States
- Language: English

I Love a Mystery is a 1945 American mystery film directed by Henry Levin and starring Jim Bannon, Nina Foch, George Macready, and Barton Yarborough. Based on Carlton E. Morse's popular radio serial of the same name, I Love a Mystery was the first of three Columbia "B" pictures inspired by the radio series and the only one actually based on a script written by Morse for the radio series. The Devil's Mask and The Unknown followed in 1946.

== Plot ==
The opening narration tells the audience it is watching, "I Love a Mystery, featuring the adventures of Jack Packard and Doc Long in the Decapitation of Jefferson Monk."

Two private detectives, Jim Packard (Jim Bannon) and Doc Long (Barton Yarborough), make the uneasy acquaintance of Jefferson Monk (George Macready) at a nightclub. When a flaming dessert is nearly spilled onto the trio, Monk reveals it was meant for him. He explains that, according to a prophecy, he is to die in three days. Upon learning their profession, Monk hires the two for protection, particularly from a hideous, peg-legged horror who stalks the streets, toting a valise, supposedly to use in transporting Monk's severed head to an ancient secret society. When Packard and Doc trail Monk and a woman companion outside the nightclub, the one-legged man appears, but he eludes capture.

Eventually, Packard comes to suspect someone is trying to drive Monk to suicide. He has learned Monk's two-million dollar inheritance will go to charity instead of to his wife Ellen should he divorce her (Nina Foch). Since Mrs. Monk has the most to gain from Monk's demise, it is assumed she is the person behind the conspiracy. In the end, Packard discovers Monk has begun killing off his wife's fellow conspirators, one by one, including the one-legged stalker. Later Monk presumes Packard and Long have figured all this out. He thus decides to kill them. However, the detectives foil his scheme, and Monk is forced to flee in his car. He loses control of the speeding auto and is involved in a collision. Ironically, this results in his own decapitation.

== Cast ==
- Jim Bannon as Jack Packard
- Nina Foch as Ellen Monk
- George Macready as Jefferson Monk
- Barton Yarborough as Doc Long
- Carole Mathews as Jean Anderson
- Lester Matthews as Justin Reeves / Mr. Gee

== Production ==
The radio series I Love a Mystery had been running since 1939 and starred Jim Bannon and Barton Yarborough as detectives Jack Packard and Doc Long. The story "The Decapitation of Jefferson Monk" aired in September 1943 and went for 25 episodes. Mercedes McCambridge appeared in the show.

Columbia brought the rights to the radio series, intending to produce two films annually over a period of five years. However only three films would be made, all directed by Henry Levin, produced by Wallace MacDonald and starring Barton and Yarborough.

Filming started October 1944.

== Reception ==
Variety called it "a fairly suspensful low budget chiller."
