= The Adventures of Champion (TV series) =

American television series

- Also known as: Champion the Wonder Horse
- Genre: Western/Children's
- Directed by: George Archainbaud; Ford Beebe; John English
- Starring: Barry Curtis; Jim Bannon
- Theme music composer: Norman Luboff (music); Marilyn Bergman (lyrics)
- Opening theme: "Champion, the Wonder Horse"
- Country of origin: United States
- Original language: English
- No. of seasons: 1
- No. of episodes: 26

Production
- Executive producer: Armand Schaefer
- Producers: Gene Autry; Louis Gray; Eric Jenson
- Production locations: Newhall, California; Lone Pine, California
- Running time: 30 minutes
- Production company: Flying A Productions

Original release
- Network: CBS
- Release: September 23, 1955 – March 3, 1956

The Adventures of Champion is an American children's Western television series that aired from September 23, 1955, to March 3, 1956, for 26 episodes on CBS. In the United Kingdom, the series was re-broadcast under the title Champion the Wonder Horse. The series was repeated on and off by the BBC in the UK throughout the 70s, 80s and early 90s, with its final BBC broadcast being the episode "The Stone Heart" on 23 January 1993.

== Synopsis ==
Set in the 1880s in the American Southwest, the show features 12-year-old Ricky North, who lives on a ranch with his uncle Sandy. Ricky has an uncanny ability to find himself in some kind of trouble, but is always rescued by his faithful friend Champion, the Wonder Horse, a wild stallion who has befriended Ricky. His adventures (and rescues) always involve Ricky's other constant companion, a German Shepherd named Rebel.

== Cast ==
- Champion as Champion, the Wonder Horse
- Barry Curtis as Ricky North
- Jim Bannon as Sandy North
- Blaze as Rebel, the dog

== Background and production ==
=== Casting (animals) ===
The horse starring in The Adventures of Champion was known as Television Champion, or TV Champ, for short. In real life, the Wonder Horse, Champion, was owned by Gene Autry who, over many years, owned a succession of celebrity horses bearing the same name. TV Champ was distinguished by his chestnut coat, blond mane and tail, four white stockings and broad white facial blaze. He made frequent appearances with Autry in films and television during the 1950s. Unlike his fictional namesake, TV Champ was a gelding.

Ken Beck and Jim Clark, in their book, The Encyclopedia of TV Pets: A Complete History of Television's Greatest Animal Stars, quote animal trainer Bob Blair as identifying the dog as J.R. [credited as 'Blaze'], the canine that had the title role in The Adventures of Rin Tin Tin TV program. "He was the best-trained dog in the business," Blair said.

=== Filming ===
Filmed by Flying A Productions, the series was shot on location within California. Vasquez Rocks. 34.479887°N 118.31657°W was used for the introduction and episodes. The Andy Jauregui Ranch at Placerita Canyon, Newhall 34.377°N 118.475°W was also used for several exteriors.

== Episodes ==
No.	Title	Directed by	Written by	Original release date
1	"The Saddle Tramp"	George Archainbaud	Robert Schaefer & Eric Freiwald	September 23, 1955
A prospector helps Ricky capture a gang of rustlers.
2	"Crossroad Trail"	George Archainbaud	Robert Schaefer & Eric Freiwald	September 30, 1955
A young ranch hand falls in with bad companions, but when Ricky is blinded from a fall the ranch hand comes to his aid.
3	"Salted Ground"	Ford Beebe	Orville Hampton	October 8, 1955
Ricky and Sandy try to prevent a store owner from buying a salted gold mine from con men.
4	"The Medicine Man Mystery"	George Archainbaud	Peter Dixon	October 15, 1955
Ricky believes the ventriloquist dummy being stuffed into a box is a real boy, but when Sandy investigates he discovers thieves have hidden jewelry inside the dummy.
5	"Lost River"	Ford Beebe	Paul Gangelin	October 22, 1955
A drought has struck the valley where the Norths have their ranch. Champion searches for a waterhole to help a herd of wild horses, and an elderly woman is being forced to sell her ranch for less than its worth.
6	"Renegade Stallion"	George Archainbaud	Maurice Geraghty	October 29, 1955
A prospector who just found gold is killed by outlaws, who then stampede a herd of wild horses to hide evidence of their crime. The sheriff believes Champion is responsible for the prospector's death, and tries to have him shot.
7	"Canyon of Wanted Men"	Ford Beebe	Paul Franklin	November 5, 1955
A crooked horse trader tries to get the ranchers to allow him to round up all wild horses in the valley. When they resist, the man breaks down fences so it appears as though the wild herds are destroying property.
8	"Challenge of the West"	George Archainbaud	J. Benton Cheney	November 8, 1955
Ricky tries to prove an outlaw's son didn't rob Sandy's ranch.
9	"The Outlaw's Secret"	George Archainbaud	Maurice Geraghty	November 15, 1955
A man confesses to robbing a stage coach, but claims a banker was his partner in his crime.
10	"Hangman's Noose"	Ford Beebe	J. Benton Cheney	November 22, 1955
A man discovers oil on a neighboring ranch and plans to kill the ranch owner and frame another rancher for the crime. When Ricky finds evidence, his life is in danger.
11	"King of the Rodeo"	Ford Beebe	Oliver Drake	November 29, 1955
A carnival owner steals Champion and offers a prize to anyone who can ride the horse.
12	"A Bugle for Ricky"	George Archainbaud	Ty Cobb	December 6, 1955
Ricky obtains a bugle and must use it to signal for help when he is trapped by outlaws.
13	"The Stone Heart"	John English	Orville H. Hampton	December 13, 1955
Ricky tries to help a wounded prisoner who had been forced to take part in a jail break, and is now in danger from the escaped outlaws.
14	"The Deer Hunters"	George Archainbaud	Oliver Drake	December 20, 1955
Ricky rescues a fawn caught in a snare by trappers providing meat for railroad construction workers. Ricky and Sandy try to convince the construction boss to find a new source of meat for his work crew.
15	"The Golden Hoax"	Ford Beebe	Sloan Nibley	December 27, 1955
Champion discovers stagecoach robbers are hiding money in an abandoned mineshaft. Ricky and Sandy try to capture the criminals.
16	"Johnny Hands Up"	George Archainbaud	Robert Schaefer & Eric Freiwald	January 3, 1956
Ricky and Sandy help a young lawman who is being held responsible for the mistakes of the former law officer.
17	"Black Kachina"	George Archainbaud	Samuel Newman & Richard Morgan	January 10, 1956
An evil medicine man holds a tribe's chief captive while attempting to incite violence between natives and ranchers.
18	"Mystery Mountain"	John English	Eric Freiwald & Robert Schaefer	January 17, 1956
When an Easterner is tricked into performing gold assays for a swindler Ricky and Sandy come to the man's rescue.
19	"Rails West"	George Archainbaud	Polly James	January 24, 1956
Ricky and Sandy are able to persuade the railroad to bypass the range used by Champion and a herd of wild horses, but when prospectors believe they've found gold in the area they refuse to give up their claim.
20	"The Real Unfriendly Ghost"	John English	Elizbeth Beecher	January 31, 1956
Ricky and Sandy search for a missing man in a ghost town. They discover an eccentric living resident, and suspect there may be an actual ghost there.
21	"Andrew and the Deadly Double"	John English	Joe Richardson	February 7, 1956
Mary Jane, Ricky's young neighbor, learns her newly appointed guardian, Uncle Andrew, plans to sell her ranch and force her to move East with him. When Mary Jane suspects her guardian is an imposter she is taken captive by the man.
22	"Bad Men of the Valley"	George Archainbaud	Victor Arthur	February 14, 1956
An ex-convict and his wife buy a ranch near the North's ranch and try to begin a new life. Former gang members threaten to hurt the man's wife if he doesn't help with a bank robbery.
23	"The Return of Red Cloud"	George Archainbaud	Oliver Drake	February 21, 1956
Red Cloud returns to his tribe, but he is framed for murder. Ricky and Sandy work to prove him innocent.
24	"Brand of the Lawless"	John English	J. Benton Cheney	February 28, 1956
An escaped outlaw and his gang plot to rob a bank. When a posse pursues them the gang leader tries to blackmail the escaped man's sister in order to get grubstake money from her.
25	"The Die-Hards"	George Archainbaud	Robert Schaefer & Eric Freiwald	March 3, 1956
A newly arrived Southern doctor treats Ricky's dog, Rebel. But lingering hard feelings over the Civil War may force the doctor and his wife to leave the area.
26	"Calhoun Rides Again"	John English	Ty Cobb, Eric Freiwald, & Robert Schaefer	March 3, 1956
An old cowboy returns to the area and helps Ricky and Sandy capture a gang of outlaws.

== Home Media ==
Twenty-three episodes were released on DVD by Film Chest Media in 2014. The set consisted of three discs. A PAL version containing 23 episodes was released in a six disc collection by Elstree Hill Entertainment in 2005.

== Related shows ==
The television program used characters similar to those in the 1949–50 radio serial, The Adventures of Champion. The radio serial told of young Ricky West (rather than Ricky North), who was raised on a ranch by his adoptive Uncle Smoky (rather than Sandy). Ricky was often accompanied by his German Shepherd, Rebel.

Beginning in 1950, The Gene Autry Show, a western/cowboy television series, aired for 91 episodes on CBS. The Adventures of Champion was a prime time spinoff for the 1955–1956 season.
