= Run for the Roses (film) =

1977 film by Henry Levin

- Directed by: Henry Levin
- Written by: Mimi Avins; Joseph G. Prieto
- Based on: story by Mario Crespo
- Produced by: Mario Crespo
- Starring: Vera Miles; Stuart Whitman; Panchito Gómez; Henry Brandon; Lisa Eilbacher; Sam Groom
- Cinematography: Raúl Domínguez
- Edited by: Alfredo Rosas Priego
- Music by: Raúl Lavista
- Production company: Pan American Films
- Distributed by: Kodiak Films
- Release date: July 8, 1977 (Lexington)
- Running time: 93 minutes
- Country: United States
- Language: English
- Budget: less than $500,000

Run for the Roses (also known as The Thoroughbreds and Champions) is a 1977 American drama film about horse-racing directed by Henry Levin and starring Vera Miles, Stuart Whitman and Panchito Gómez.

== Plot ==
A young boy named Juanito Hernandez befriends and nurses back to health a horse that undergoes an operation. When the horse recovers, owner Clarissa Stewart and her trainer, Charlie, come to believe Juanito's hunch that the recovered horse now has a good chance to win the Kentucky Derby.

== Cast ==
- Panchito Gómez as Juanito Hernandez
- Vera Miles as Clarissa Stewart
- Stuart Whitman as Charlie
- Henry Brandon as Jeff
- Lisa Eilbacher as Carol
- Sam Groom as Jim
- James Murphy as Eddie

== Production ==
It was the first English language film from Pan American Films, the company owned by Maple Lawn Farm horseman Mario Crespo, the film's executive producer. He specialised making Spanish language films in South America and Puerto Rico. Reportedly Crespo also made pornographic films.

The movie was originally going to be shot in the Dominican Republic but it was decided to film it in Kentucky after the formation of the Kentucky Film Commission (this was the first movie shot in the state after the formation of the commission).

Filming started October 11, 1976, in Lexington, Kentucky, under the title The Thoroughbreds. Filming took four weeks with post production in Mexico. Most of the technicians were Spanish.

The film cost less than $500,000 with finance being raised from Lexington citizens. Henry Levin had made April Love in Lexington 19 years earlier.

The film was meant to star Ida Lupino but she dropped out shortly after filming began, having contracted the flu, and was replaced by Vera Miles. Locations used include Spindletop Farm, Keeneland and Camulet Farm.

== Reception ==
The film opened in Lexington in June 1977 as The Thoroughbreds. It received a limited release. Reportedly no distributor would handle the film "until a substantial amount of money had been spent on reshooting and remaking" portions of the film.

The film was released in other territories in 1978 as Run for the Roses. The Danville Register called it "a modestly produced, fairly well acted horse racing yarn."

== Lawsuit ==
Dr. Arnold Pessin, a veterinarian who was executive producer, and producer Mario Crespo were later sued by six Louisville residents over the financing and promotion of the movie. The residents claim Pessin and Crespo made several "untrue statements" while soliciting investments. They claimed losses in excess of $90,000 plus $100,000 for punitive damages.

An employee of Crespo's, Melanie Flynn, went missing in 1977.

== See also ==
- List of films about horses
- List of films about horse racing
