= Barry Curtis (actor) =

American film and television actor (1943–2019)

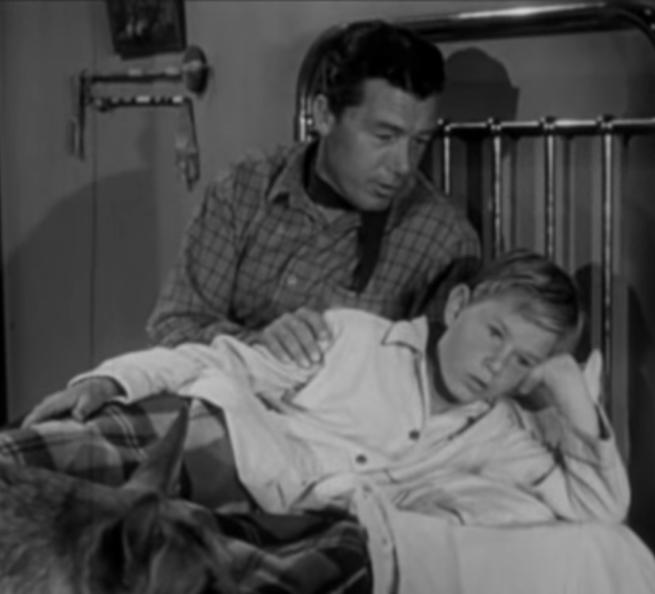
- Curtis (bottom) with Jim Bannon in The Adventures of Champion, 1955
- Born: Barry Alan Curtis; September 10, 1943; Los Angeles, California, U.S.
- Died: January 13, 2019 (aged 75); Hilo, Hawaii, U.S.
- Education: University of California; Harvard University
- Occupations: Film and television actor
- Years active: 1952–2011
- Spouse: Julie Curtis

Barry Alan Curtis (September 10, 1943 – January 13, 2019) was an American film and television actor. He was known for playing Ricky North in the American western television series The Adventures of Champion.

Born in Los Angeles, California. Curtis decided to become an actor at the age of six. He began his career in 1952, appearing in the film The Marrying Kind. Curtis then appeared in the 1953 film Abbott and Costello Go to Mars. In 1955, he starred in the new CBS western television series The Adventures of Champion playing Ricky North. He starred alongside actor, Jim Bannon, who played the role of Sandy North. Curtis played Nugget Saunders in the 1955 film One Desire. His television credits include Leave it to Beaver, Father Knows Best,The Lone Ranger, The Sheriff of Cochise, Sergeant Preston of the Yukon, Annie Oakley and State Trooper.

Curtis retired in 1960, last appearing in the sitcom television series Leave It to Beaver. After retiring, he attended the University of California, earning his philosophy degree. He then attended Harvard University, earning his doctor of philosophy degree, in 1975. Curtis taught at numerous universities, the last of which was the University of Hawaiʻi at Hilo, where he began teaching in 2011.

Curtis died on January 13, 2019, in a hospital in Hilo, Hawaii, at the age of 75.
