= I Love a Mystery =

American radio drama series, 1939-1944

I Love a Mystery cast (l to r): Russell Thorson (who portrayed Jack Packard) watches Athena Lord (as Jerri Booker) and her real-life husband, Jim Boles (as Doc).

I Love a Mystery is an American radio drama series that aired 1939–44 and 1949–52, and was written and directed by Carlton E. Morse, about three friends who ran a detective agency and traveled the world in search of adventure. The adventure-mystery series stood in stark contrast to Morse's other major radio success, the drama series One Man's Family.

The central characters, Jack Packard, Doc Long, and Reggie York, met as mercenary soldiers fighting the Japanese in China. Later, they met again in San Francisco, where they decided to form the A-1 Detective Agency. Their motto was "No job too tough, no adventure too baffling". The agency served as a plot device to involve the trio in a wide variety of stories. These straddled the genres of mystery, adventure, and supernatural horror, and the plot lines often took them to exotic locales. Over the years, Jack was played by Michael Raffetto, Russell Thorson, Jay Novello, Jim Bannon, and John McIntire. Doc was played by Barton Yarborough and Jim Boles. Reggie was portrayed by Walter Paterson and Tony Randall. The agency's secretary, Jerry Booker, was played by Gloria Blondell. After Paterson committed suicide in 1942, his friend Morse could not bear to recast the role and Reggie was written out of the series. In later shows, Jerry's role was increased, and she replaced Reggie.

== Broadcast history ==
Sponsored by Fleischmann's Yeast, I Love a Mystery first aired on the NBC West Coast network from January 16 to September 29, 1939, weekdays at 3:15 p.m. Pacific time, and then moved to the full NBC network from October 2, 1939, to March 29, 1940, airing weeknights at 7:15 p.m.

In 1940, it expanded to 30-minute episodes from April 4 to June 27 on NBC Thursdays at 8:30 p.m. Continuing on the Blue Network from September 30, 1940, to June 29, 1942, it was heard Mondays and Wednesdays at 8 p.m.

Procter & Gamble (for Oxydol and Ivory Soap) replaced Fleishmann's Yeast as the sponsor in the series broadcast by CBS from March 22, 1943, to December 29, 1944, with 15-minute episodes heard weeknights at 7 p.m.

== Revivals ==
After a four-year lapse, Jack, Reggie, and Doc returned in 1948 with a title change to I Love Adventure, broadcast on ABC from April 25 to July 18, 1948. It followed the post-war adventures of the trio who worked for the Twenty-One Old Men of 10 Gramercy Park in London, an extra-governmental organization of some power. I Love Adventure ran for 13 episodes.

A year later, I Love a Mystery was revived on the Mutual Broadcasting System, and the production relocated from Hollywood to New York. This series, which was sustaining, began October 3, 1949, and continued until December 26, 1952, with 15-minute episodes heard weeknights at 7 p.m. during 1949-1950 and then 10:15 p.m. from 1950 to 1952. The Mutual series recreated the original scripts written by Morse for the earlier NBC series.

== Cast ==
The primary characters of I Love a Mystery and I Love Adventure were played by the following actors:

- Jack Packard:
  - Michael Raffetto (1939–1942; 1948)
  - John McIntire (1943–1944)
  - Jay Novello (1943–1944)
  - Russell Thorsen (1949–1952)
  - Robert Dryden (1952)
- Doc Long:
  - Barton Yarborough (1939–1944; 1948)
  - Jim Boles (1949–1952)
- Reggie York:
  - Walter Paterson (1939–1942)
  - Tom Collins (1948)
  - Tony Randall (1949–1952)
- Jerry Booker: Gloria Blondell (1942–1944)

== Story situations and characters ==
Tough, charismatic group leader Jack is usually the first to figure solutions to the mysteries. Jack has more of an edge than the typical radio hero of the period. He distrusts the attractive women who always seem to show up, and he professes to dislike women in general. The series' writer claimed that Jack's problems with women had to do with his youth. He had gotten a girl pregnant and had to leave his home town in shame. This was only a back story detail and was never made explicit on the show. Doc and Reggie are slightly less edgy characters. The Texas-born Doc is a hard-fighting, boastful, high-spirited character who provides comic relief. Reggie, an Englishman noted for his great strength, however, usually shied away from the fairer sex.

Morse, whom some critics have ranked among the leading writers of radio drama, created detailed settings for the show and elaborate, often bizarre plots. In contrast to the serious, strait-laced heroes typical of radio at the time, his three protagonists were reckless and exuberant. Jack, Doc and Reggie were more interested in the thrill of adventure than in righting wrongs, and whenever they collected a fee, they set out to spend it as quickly as possible.

=== Controversy ===
- Actor Peter Lorre once sent Morse a letter threatening legal action because a character named Michel in two of the serials sounded like Lorre. Morse dropped the character from the series shortly after.
- "The Temple of the Vampires" was the first serial to cause concerned parents to write letters to the network expressing concern about its effect upon children.
- When Walter Paterson committed suicide, the character of Reggie was written out of the series, but he was mentioned by name two years later.

=== Theme music ===
Valse Triste by Jean Sibelius was the program's theme music. During the show's Mutual run, its opening was a train approaching a grade crossing sounding its horn full-tilt.

=== Epilogue ===
In 2009 Audio Cinema Entertainment, Inc. got the blessings of the Morse Estate to do recreations of the full series based on the Hollywood run.

== Surviving serials ==
Despite the popularity of the program, few series have survived in a listenable state.

=== Series that have survived in their entirety ===
- "The Thing That Cries in the Night"
- "Bury Your Dead, Arizona"

=== Series that have survived in part ===
Several or all episodes of the following series are missing, but recreations have been made:

- "Fear Creeps Like a Cat"; all episodes are recreations.
- "The Temple of Vampires"; episodes 8-15 are recreations.

Several episodes of the following series are missing, hence explaining plot holes in surviving copies:

- "The Million Dollar Curse"
- "Battle of the Century"
- "The Hermit of San Felipe Atabapo"

=== Reconstructed versions ===
In 1989, Episodes 8-15 of "The Temple of Vampires" were recreated for Bud Carey's Old Radio Theater on KALW with Frank Knight, Pat Franklin, Nicky Emmanuel and Rosemary Leever.

"The Fear That Creeps Like A Cat", the serial preceding "The Thing That Cries in the Night", was completely recreated in 1996 by Jim Harmon Productions starring Les Tremayne as Jack Packard, Tony Clay as Doc Long, Frank Bresee as Reggie York, and Fred Foy as the announcer.

== Series log ==
First season

(NBC Pacific Coast, Monday-Friday 15-minute episodes)

- 1 "The Case of the Roxy Mob" (1/16 – 2/3 1939, 15 episodes)
- 2 "Death Aboard the Lady Mary" (2/6 – 2/24 1939, 15 episodes)
- 3 "The Case of the Nevada Cougar" (2/27 – 3/31 1939, 25 episodes)
- 4 "Mystery of the Lady K Ranch" (4/3 – 4/28 1939, 20 episodes)
- 5 "Strange Affair of Sandy Spring Sanatorium" (5/1 – 5/19 1939, 15 episodes)
- 6 "The Texas Border Smugglers" (5/22 – 6/9 1939, 15 episodes)
- 7 "The El Paso, Texas Murders" (6/12 – 12/30 1939, 15 episodes)
- 8 "Flight to Death" (7/3 – 7/31 1939, 15 episodes)
- 9 "Murder Hollywood Style" (7/27 – 8/11 1939, 15 episodes)
- 10 "Incident Concerning Death" (8/14 – 9/1 1939, 15 episodes)
- 11 "Yolo County/Battle of the Century" (9/7 – 9/29 1939, 18 episodes)
- 12 "The Blue Phantom" (10/2 – 10/20 1939, 15 episodes)
- 13 “Castle Island" (10/23 – 11/17 1939, 20 episodes)
- 14 “Hollywood Cherry" (11/20 – 12/8 1939, 15 episodes)
- 15 "Bury Your Dead, Arizona" (12/11 – 12/29 1939, 15 episodes)
- 16 "San Diego Murders" (1/1 – 1/19 1940, 15 episodes)
- 17 "Temple of Vampires" (1/22 – 2/16 1940, 20 episodes)
- 18 "The Brooks Kidnapping" (2/19 – 3/8 1940, 15 episodes)
- 19 "Murder in Turquoise Pass" (3/11 – 3/29 1940, 15 episodes)

(NBC Red Network, Thursdays, 30-minute episodes)

- 20 "The Snake with the Diamond Eyes" (4/4 – 6/27 1940, 13 episodes)

Second season

(NBC Blue Network, Mondays, 30-minute episodes)

- 21 "The Tropics Don't Call It Murder" (9/30 – 12/30 1940, 13 episodes)
- 22 "The Case of the Transplanted Castle" (1/6 – 3/3 1941, 9 episodes)
- 23 "Murder on February Island" (3/10 – 5/5 1941, 9 episodes)
- 24 "Eight Kinds of Murder" (5/12 – 6/30 1941, 8 episodes)

Third season

- 25 "The Monster in the Mansion" (10/6 – 11/24 1941, 8 episodes)
- 26 "Secret Passage to Death" (12/1/1941 – 02/02/1942, 10 episodes)
- 27 "Terror of Frozen Corpse Lodge" (2/9 – 4/4 1942, 9 episodes)
- 28 "Pirate Loot of the Island of Skulls" (4/13 – 6/29 1942, 12 episodes)

Fourth season

(CBS, Monday-Friday, 15-minute episodes)

- 29 "The Girl in the Gilded Cage" (3/22 – 4/9 1943, 15 episodes)
- 30 "Blood on the Cat" (4/12 – 5/7 1943, 20 episodes)
- 31 "The Killer of Circle M" (5/10 – 6/4 1943, 20 episodes)
- 32 "Stairway to the Sun" (6/7 – 7/16 1943, 30 episodes)
- 33 "The Graves of Whamperjaw, Texas" (7/19 – 8/6 1943, 15 episodes)
- 34 "Murder Is the Word for It" (8/9 – 8/27 1943, 15 episodes)
- 35 "The Decapitation of Jefferson Monk" (8/30 – 10/1 1943, 25 episodes)
- 36 "My Beloved Is a Vampire" (10/4 – 11/5 1943, 25 episodes)
- 37 "The Hermit of San Felipe Atabapo" (11/8 – 12/3 1943, 20 episodes)
- 38 "The Deadly Sin of Richard Coyle" (12/6 – 12/24 1943, 15 episodes)
- 39 "The Twenty Traitors of Timbuktu" (12/27/1943 – 02/24/1944, 44 episodes)
- 40 "The African Jungle Mystery" (2/28 – 3/24 1944, 20 episodes)
- 41 "The Widow with the Amputation" (3/27 – 4/21 1944, 20 episodes)
- 42 "I Am the Destroyer of Women" (4/24 – 5/12 1944, 15 episodes)
- 43 "You Can't Pin a Murder on Nevada" (5/15 – 6/2 1944, 15 episodes)
- 44 "The Corpse in Compartment C, Car 75" (6/5 – 6/9 1944, 5 episodes)
- 45 "The Thing Wouldn't Die" (6/13 – 7/7 1944, 20 episodes)
- 46 "The Case of the Terrified Comedian" (7/10 – 8/7 1944, 21 episodes)
- 47 "The Man Who Hated to Shave" (8/8 – 8/21 1944, 10 episodes)
- 48 "Temple of Vampires" (8/22 – 9/18 1944, 20 episodes)
- 49 "The Bride of the Werewolf" (9/19 – 10/9 1944, 15 episodes)
- 50 "The Monster in the Mansion" (10/10 – 11/09 1944, 23 episodes)
- 51 "Portrait of a Murderess" (11/10 – 12/7 1944, 20 episodes)
- 52 "Find Elsa Holberg, Dead or Alive" (12/8 – 12/29 1944, 16 episodes)

== Film, TV and comics adaptations ==
A 1945 mystery film called I Love A Mystery starred Jim Bannon as Jack, Barton Yarborough as Doc, George Macready, and Nina Foch. Reggie did not appear in the movies as he had been written out of the radio series. The movie was about a man who seeks protection after he predicts his own death in three days. Two more movies in the series starring Bannon and Yarborough followed in 1946: The Devil's Mask and The Unknown.

Also, Jim Bannon starred in a fourth ILAM theatrical movie—sort of—when "The Fear That Creeps Like A Cat" was adapted as "The Missing Juror". The names Jack Packard, etc. were dropped and Bannon played a Packard-like character named Joe Keats.

A TV movie which was also a pilot for a proposed I Love a Mystery TV series, was produced in 1967 for Universal Pictures and starred Les Crane as Jack, David Hartman as Doc, and Hagan Beggs as Reggie. The film was based on the radio episode "The Thing That Cries in the Night". After being shelved for six years, NBC broadcast the movie in 1973.

I Love a Mystery was an influence in the development of the long-running Hanna-Barbera franchise Scooby-Doo in its early stages of development as a live-action series under the working titles Mysteries Five and Who's Scared?

The radio show was also adapted in a comic book version by Don Sherwood.
