= The Treasure Seekers (1979 film) =

1979 British-American action film by Henry Levin

- Directed by: Henry Levin
- Written by: Rod Taylor; Walter Brough
- Produced by: Sam Manners
- Starring: Rod Taylor; Stuart Whitman
- Cinematography: Joe Jackman; Richard Kelley
- Edited by: Keith Stafford
- Music by: Byron Lee
- Production companies: Halart Productions; Metro-Goldwyn-Mayer; Cannon Films
- Distributed by: United Artists
- Release date: 1979
- Countries: United States; United Kingdom
- Language: English

The Treasure Seekers (also known as Forty Million Bucks, On a Dead Man's Chest, Treasure of Death, 40 Million Bucks on a Dead Man's Chest, Contraband and Jamaican Gold) is a 1979 British-American action film directed by Henry Levin and starring Rod Taylor, Stuart Whitman and Elke Sommer. It was written by Taylor and Walter Brough.

== Premise ==
Two men who used to play college football together - wealthy lawyer Marian Casey and down to earth Stack Baker - meet by chance at Montego Bay Marina in Jamaica. Baker shows Casey around the island, and the two friends get involved in a brawl. Baker introduces Casey to Meat Cleaver Stewart, a gruff scavenger, and his daughter Debbie. Cleaver has a treasure map but no money to fund a proper search.

Reginald Landers proposes Casey becomes his partner in the search for Henry Morgan's treasure. Debbie tries to seduce Casey but he refuses. Landers' mistress, Ursula, is also seeing Baker.

== Cast ==
- Rod Taylor as Marian Casey
- Stuart Whitman as Stack Baker
- Elke Sommer as Ursula
- Jeremy Kemp as Reginald Landers
- Bob Phillips as Joe
- Jennie Sherman as Debbie
- Keenan Wynn as Meat Cleaver Stewart
- Keith Foote as Lincoln
- Dan Jackson as Supt. Prinz
- Patrick Wymore as Shelley
- Patricia Hornung as Alicia
- Hans Kahn as German captain
- Paul Methuen as Merril Jr
- Joanna Wilhelm as Merril Jr.'s wife
- Dermot Hussey as Stevan

== Production ==
In June 1975 it was announced Taylor would star with Stuart Whitman in On a Dead Man's Chest directed by Henry Levin.

Filming took place on location in Jamaica in 1976 and was finished by June. Locations included Montego Bay, Kingston, Admiral's Inn, Coldeck Castle and Bowden Wharf.

There were a number of problems during the shoot and post production.

== Reception ==
Derek Winnert wrote: "Rod Taylor and Stuart Whitman are both pretty dull, while Jeremy Kemp and Keenan Wynn (as Meat Cleaver Stewart) overact but liven things up a bit, and it is good to have Elke Sommer aboard as the alluring Ursula. However, director Levin does not manage much energy or excitement, though there is an entertaining action climax."
