= Brigid Bazlen =

American actress (1944–1989)

Brigid Mary Bazlen
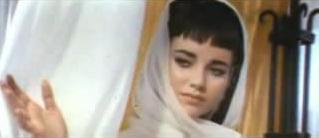
- Bazlen as Salome in the King of Kings (1961)
- Born: June 9, 1944; Fond du Lac, Wisconsin, U.S.
- Died: May 25, 1989 (aged 44); Seattle, Washington, U.S.
- Occupation: Actress
- Years active: 1958–1972
- Spouse(s): Jean-Paul Vignon (1966–1968, divorced); Marlin Greene (1972–1979)
- Children: 1

Brigid Mary Bazlen (June 9, 1944 – May 25, 1989) was an American film, television and stage actress. Although she made only three Hollywood films, The Honeymoon Machine, King of Kings, and How the West Was Won, she is still remembered for the latter two. Bazlen retired from acting while she was in her late 20s (1972), and she died from cancer at the age of 44.

== Early life and career ==
Bazlen was born in Fond du Lac, Wisconsin. Her father was Arthur Bazlen, a retail chain executive, and her mother was Maggie Daly, a newspaper columnist with Chicago's American (Chicago Today and the Chicago Tribune). Maggie Daly was, with her three sisters, one of what Time magazine referred to as "the celebrated Daly sisters", who were known for their writing and work in journalism, fashion and advertising. Life magazine ran two feature stories on the sisters with a young Bazlen appearing in the second. Columnist Maggie ("Daly Diary" in Chicago's American), the oldest sister, a one-time model was known for her lunch time Chicago fashion shows and as a radio and television talk show guest and TV show host. Kay Daly, who worked in advertising with such people as Richard Avedon, became a Revlon vice president responsible for its advertising. Novelist and writer Maureen Daly became famous for writing Seventeenth Summer at age 19. Sheila Daly, the youngest, who wrote a Chicago Tribune teen column beginning at a very young age, eventually went into advertising as well.

Bazlen was "discovered" in 1950 at the age of 6 waiting for a school bus in front of her house by an NBC executive. The network was testing for the then groundbreaking soap opera Hawkins Falls, Population 6200 (which went on to become the first successful television soap opera) starring Maurice Copeland and Bernardine Flynn, and the executive asked Bazlen's parents for permission to test her. While her mother initially refused, she later relented and Bazlen won a part and became a regular on the show for two years, winning rave reviews.

=== The Blue Fairy (1958) ===
In 1958, Bazlen won the starring role in the children's program The Blue Fairy, broadcast by the independent station WGN-TV in Chicago on Monday nights (7:30 pm – 8:00 pm). It was one of the earliest children's shows to be produced in color. The producer of the show had spotted Bazlen playing hopscotch outside of Bazlen's Chicago home and told Bazlen's mother that "your little girl is just right for my TV series". In the show, the Blue Fairy, played by Bazlen, lived in the "Blue Forest". Dressed in a blue gown and diamond tiara, she also clasped a silver wand. At the beginning of each show, Bazlen, suspended by wires, would fly (as if on elfin wings) across the stage saying "I'm the Blue Fairy, I'll grant you a wish to make all your dreams come true." She would then sit on an oversized mushroom visited by creatures such as Tugnacious R. Jones, Myrtle Flower, and an old nasal voiced wizard (which were puppets designed by George Nelle and writer-director Don Kane), and introduced stories enacted by the Rufus Rose Marionettes. They also engaged in projects which included constructing a popcorn machine that would not stop popping and making a sewing machine that turned out marbles. Bazlen won enormous critical praise for her performance (one critic describing it as "beguiling" and "mesmerising" and Hedda Hopper declared Bazlen "the Celtic Alice in Wonderland"), and the show was recognized as the top children's program of 1958 winning a Peabody Award. Bazlen herself said of her role that she "flew around and had a wonderful time". Although The Blue Fairy could only be seen locally in Chicago on Channel 9, the Peabody Award it won brought it and Bazlen to national attention. The show also inspired Ernie Kovacs into doing one of his notorious comedy sketches where Kovacs (wearing a mustache, chewing a cigar, dressed in a blue gown and blonde wig, and holding a silver wand) flew across a stage, slammed head first into a wall on the opposite side, and was then left dangling in mock lifelessness in mid-air.

=== Too Young to Go Steady (1959) ===
Based on her performances in The Blue Fairy, offers poured in for Bazlen. Richard Rodgers and Oscar Hammerstein wanted her to co-star with Mary Martin in the theatrical production of The Sound of Music, Otto Preminger wanted her for his upcoming production of Exodus, and Paddy Chayefsky wanted her for his Broadway play The Dybbuk of Woodlawn. Bazlen's mother, however, turned these down and instead allowed her to take a part in the NBC TV comedy drama Too Young to Go Steady. The series starred Joan Bennett, and Bazlen played her daughter Pamela Blake. Martin Huston, then 18, was cast as Johnny Blake.

=== King of Kings (1961) ===
Bazlen portrays Salome in King of Kings (1961), seen here performing an erotic dance in order to incite King Herod with lust into giving her "anything [she] wants" – in other words, the head of John the Baptist.

Through her role in Too Young to Go Steady and because she was "precociously attractive" (as one critic put it) in a way similar to Elizabeth Taylor at the same age, Bazlen came to be dubbed "the next Elizabeth Taylor" and was signed by Metro-Goldwyn-Mayer (who started promoting her as "the new American Bardot"). The first film she did for MGM was King of Kings, which also starred Jeffrey Hunter as Jesus. Bazlen played the role of Salome. Bazlen won the part when she met the film's producer, Samuel Bronston, at a party to which Bazlen's mother had taken her. Bazlen said of the offer, that "It was like [being spotted] all over again, for Mr Bronston offered me the Salome part straight away." Nevertheless, Bazlen's performance as Salome came in for especially hostile criticism at the time, the ferocity of it being partly inspired by the fact that Bazlen's selection for the role was viewed as MGM dictated. Nevertheless, just as the film itself is now highly regarded, Bazlen's performance has likewise been re-evaluated down the years as being superb (her voluptuous seduction of a drunken lascivious Herod winning her especially rave reviews.) Hunter's performance as Jesus, especially in the Sermon on the Mount scene, has also won much acclaim, as have the performances of Robert Ryan as John the Baptist and Frank Thring as Herod Antipas – the film is included in Danny Peary's list of "must see" films in his book Guide for the Film Fanatic). In its review of the film, Film Fanatic states: "My favorite 'Roman scene' shows the infamous Salome (played by Brigid Bazlen as a sexy teenage hussy) tempting her stepfather, King Herod (Thring), into decapitating John the Baptist (a shaggy-headed Robert Ryan) and bringing her his head on a platter; while this vignette may not be substantiated by biblical scholars, it plays well on the screen!". Accordingly, Bazlen's performance as Salome is regarded as her best performance. Bazlen said of her role as Salome: "A fantastic amount of research went into King of Kings and it seems that Salome was in her teens when she demanded the head of John the Baptist. She may well be the first juvenile delinquent on record. Some people are surprised that I used no veils in my dance, but it is a false assumption that Salome did a strip tease. I had to form my seductive charming of Herod with a pure Oriental-African dance movement of the period." According to Bazlen's daughter Marguerite, despite the unfair criticism Bazlen received at the time of the film's release, Bazlen was very proud of her performance. Furthermore, shortly after making the film, Bazlen said that "I was a little overwhelmed to have such an important role for my first film part, but I found Nicholas Ray to be a most considerate director."

=== The Honeymoon Machine (1961) ===
Bazlen's next film for MGM was The Honeymoon Machine alongside Steve McQueen, Jim Hutton, and Paula Prentiss. Although the film was made after King of Kings, it was released before it, thus becoming Bazlen's first Hollywood movie. In The Honeymoon Machine, Bazlen stars as Julie Fitch, girlfriend of Lieutenant Fergie Howard (played by Steve McQueen) and daughter of Admiral Fitch (played by Dean Jagger). According to Christopher Sandford in his biography on Steve McQueen, Bazlen briefly became involved with McQueen while making The Honeymoon Machine, although McQueen fought "Bazlen nonstop" over issues relating to the film. Nevertheless, Peter Haigh in ABC Film Review said of her performance in the film that Bazlen "displayed a nice sense of comedy", and Bazlen said that she found making the film "less of a strain" than the making of King of Kings. As with King of Kings, however, the film critics of the time were scathing in their assessment of Bazlen's performance, with one's stating that Bazlen was "incapable of anything but looking pretty". Nonetheless, just as with her performance in King of Kings, her performance in The Honeymoon Machine has been re-evaluated down the years as being of a very high standard. Moreover, Bazlen responded to the overly harsh criticism by simply stating that she was "a hard worker".

=== How the West Was Won (1962) ===
Bazlen's final film role was as Dora Hawkins, daughter of Jeb Hawkins, a river pirate played by Walter Brennan in How the West Was Won, a film about the history of the western expansion in the United States as told from the perspective of one pioneer family. She appears in only one sequence, coaxing fur trapper Linus Rawlings (James Stewart) into a trap, stabbing him and sending him falling into a lake. Presumed dead, Stewart crawls out of a trap, just in time to save the Prescott family (played by Karl Malden, Agnes Moorehead, Debbie Reynolds and Carroll Baker), whom he had befriended before, from being robbed and possibly murdered. The fight that follows results in the complete destruction of the Hawkins clan when Rawlings sets off some gun powder.

== Reflections on youth ==
During the making of King of Kings, The Honeymoon Machine, and How the West Was Won, as Bazlen was still only 17 years of age at the time, she had to attend educational classes between takes in order to comply with the Los Angeles Board of Education's requirement that she complete three hours of study per day Monday to Friday. Moreover, when answering a question during this time about whether young people were misunderstood by the older generation, she said "Yes, but I'm sure that's been the case down the ages. It's too much to expect people of the older generation completely to understand people of my age. Some of the ways in which we behave were unheard of in my mother's young days, but each generation finds different symbols to express its discontent." Also, when asked at the same time about how she felt about her rapid rise to stardom at such a young age, Bazlen said "I realise what a lucky person I am, and I'm anxious to repay the trust a lot of important people have placed in me. Reaching so high so young has put a lot of responsibility on my shoulders, but I feel that responsibility is part of the pattern of living and it is not to be taken lightly."

== Later career and life after acting ==
How the West Was Won completed Bazlen's three-film contract deal with MGM and her contract was not renewed following the criticism of her performance as Salome in King of Kings.

After completing her role in How the West Was Won, Bazlen returned to Chicago where she appeared in many stage roles until 1966 when she gave up performing to marry the French singer Jean-Paul Vignon. The marriage produced one daughter (Marguerite Vignon – the birth coming as a pleasant surprise to Bazlen because she had been told that she would never have children; it was only four months into the marriage that she found out she was pregnant), but ended in divorce. Bazlen later married Nashville session player/producer Marlin Greene. This marriage also ended in divorce after seven years. At the time her acting career was at its zenith in 1961 and 1962, she said that her ideal marriage would take place when she was between 20 and 22 years of age and to "someone 10 to 20 years my senior, preferably not an actor. Marriages between actors seldom work out satisfactorily. If it is an actor I marry, it won't be a young one. I find young actors are too egotistical. I prefer more mature men; James Stewart is a wonderful example." She also added that the person she would like to marry would be "someone I could learn from".

Bazlen returned to acting briefly in the early 1970s in Chicago dinner theater plays that included Nobody Loves an Albatross as Jean Hart playing opposite Gig Young, Under the Yum Yum Tree and Once More with Feeling. Then, in 1972, she took the role of Mary Anderson in the NBC daytime TV drama Days of Our Lives. After this role, however, she completely retired from acting. Her mother later stated that Bazlen lost interest in acting as she grew older. Moreover, Bazlen's daughter, Marguerite, stated in a 2007 interview that Bazlen was a very private person who spoke very little about her past and that "She was very kind-hearted, very fair, emotional. Not affectionate, as kind-hearted as she was, she was not a touchy, feely kind of person." Bazlen's daughter also recalled that Bazlen was a very witty person with a dry sense of humor and that her reluctance to talk openly about her acting career was related to her shyness because "Whenever one of her movies would air, she made sure we all went out for dinner so we couldn't stay home and watch! It wasn't that she was embarrassed by it, but I think once she left that world she was shy about it. She was very proud of her work on The Blue Fairy."

== Later life and death ==
Bazlen moved to Bellevue, Washington, outside of Seattle and spent the latter part of her life caring for her mother Maggie Daly, who had developed a tumor on her left leg which ultimately led to the leg being amputated below the knee. Bazlen worked as a designer in stained glass. She was a heavy smoker and her health began to decline as she entered her mid-40s. She died on May 25, 1989, less than a month before her 45th birthday, although her death was not reported until almost a month later.

== Film and television appearances ==
- Hawkins Falls (1955, TV series) as Nellie Corey
- Too Young to Go Steady (1959, TV series) as Pam Blake
- The Honeymoon Machine (1961) as Julie Fitch
- King of Kings (1961) as Salome
- How the West Was Won (1962) as Dora Hawkins
- Days of Our Lives (1965, TV series) as Mary Anderson #1 (1972)
- Bright Promise (1969, TV series) as Nurse Radford (1972) (final appearance)
