= Oldsmobile Music Theatre =

American TV musical anthology series (1959)

- Presented by: Bill Hayes; Florence Henderson

Production
- Producers: Jacqueline Babbin; David Susskind

Original release
- Network: NBC
- Release: March 26 – May 7, 1959

Oldsmobile Music Theatre is an American musical anthology television series that was broadcast on NBC from March 26, 1959, until May 7, 1959.

Bill Hayes and Florence Henderson, who were already known as "goodwill salesmen for Oldsmobile", were hosts of the series. The show featured episodes "in which a musical element was woven into the storyline". Episodes ranged from musical comedies to dramas, and none of the music was original with the show. Hayes said, "The show hits that large middle ground among performers — actors who want to sing and singers who want to act."

Hayes and Henderson appeared in some of the stories. Guest stars on the series included Carol Lawrence and Roddy McDowall. The Herbie Mann Quartet also sang on the show.

== Episodes ==
The premiere episode was "A Nice Place to Hide', with French singer Genevieve and Jackie Cooper, in which a librarian from France helped a "literary-minded bum" avoid arrest.

Other episodes included:

- "An Almost Perfect Plan", with James Shigeta and Michi Kobi, which had cultures of the East and West interacting at a soda fountain.
- "The Sound of Murder", with Dorothy Collins and Ralph Meeker, in which a worker at a carnival was afraid to talk about a robbery.

The April 30, 1959, episode departed from the usual format, featuring Hayes and Henderson in 30 minutes of songs.

== Production ==
Oldsmobile Music Theatre was produced by Jacqueline Babbin and David Susskind. The show was broadcast on Thursdays from 8:30 to 9 p.m. Eastern Time. It was replaced by Too Young to Go Steady.

== Critical response ==
Jack Gould, in a review distributed by the New York Times News Service, described the show's format as "a half-hour story in which snatches from popular songs are awkwardly inserted." additionally, in the opening episode, he added, the lead character "never had time to offer more than a few bars" when a song was inserted. He added that the commercials were "a little too cloying."

Shortly after the program was canceled, Val Adams wrote in The New York Times that Oldsmobile Music Theatre "has been universally criticized by the press for its lack of originality and its mediocrity. It ranks 114th in program popularity among 125 programs."
