= One More Minute (disambiguation) =

"One More Minute" is a song by Saint Tropez.

One More Minute may also refer to:

- "One More Minute", a song by "Weird Al" Yankovic from the 1985 album Dare to Be Stupid
- "One More Minute", a song by Authority Zero from the 2002 album A Passage in Time
- One More Minute, an album by Taylor Henderson

== See also ==
- "One Minute More", by Capital Cities
