= Rhymer =

Rhymer may refer to:

- Rhymer (actor), an actor in a seasonal folk play
- Rhymer (poet), a bad poet
- Rhymer (rapper), South Korean rapper and founder of Brand New Music
- Thomas the Rhymer, 13th century Scottish laird and reputed prophet

== People with the surname ==
- Don Rhymer (1961–2012), American screenwriter
- Greg Rhymer (born 1972)
- Kitwana Rhymer (born 1978)
- Paul Rhymer (1905–1964), American radio writer
