= Hawkins Falls, Population 6200 =

American TV soap opera (1950–1955)

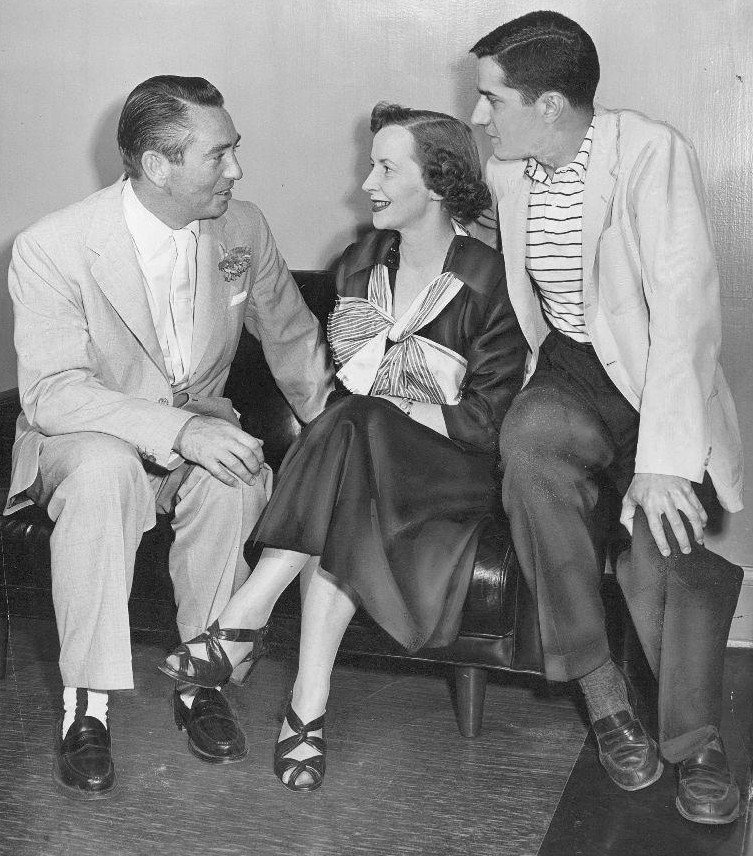
- Bernadette Flynn (center) with Macdonald Carey and Frank Pacelli, the show's director, 1953.
- Also known as: Hawkins Falls: A Television Novel
- Created by: Doug Johnson
- Starring: Bernardine Flynn; Maurice Copeland; Jim Bannon; Arthur Peterson
- Narrated by: Hugh Downs; Wed Howard
- Country of origin: United States
- Original language: English

Production
- Producers: Dave Brown; Ben Park
- Production locations: Chicago, Illinois, United States
- Running time: 50 minutes (June 1950–August 1950); 12–13 minutes (April 1951–July 1955)

Original release
- Network: NBC
- Release: June 17, 1950 – July 1, 1955

Hawkins Falls, Population 6200 is an American television soap opera that was broadcast in the 1950s, live from Chicago. Though it was not the first original (non-radio-derived) soap opera on American television, it was the first to be successful, running for more than five years.

Sponsored by Unilever's blue detergent, Surf, the program began as a prime time one-hour weekly comedy-drama on June 17, 1950, and ran in prime time on the NBC network until October 12, 1950.

On April 2, 1951, the series was moved to a fifteen-minute daytime slot, where it was retitled Hawkins Falls: A Television Novel, and developed into a soap opera format. Hawkins Falls ran until July 1, 1955, making it NBC's longest-running soap opera until The Doctors exceeded it in 1967.

The town of Hawkins Falls was patterned after the real-life town of Woodstock, Illinois.

== Overview ==
The Drewer family lived in the town of Hawkins Falls. Lona Drewer was played by Bernardine Flynn, while her husband Knap was played by Frank Dane. After the first year, according to Hugh Downs, Dane came to feel that as the lead actor he was indispensable to the show. He demanded more money and fewer hours. In a move that set the model for countless future encounters between imprudent stars and their management, Dane walked off the set and refused to return until his demands were met. The producer and writer saw their chance to accommodate Dane's desire for less work and crafted a script that sent Mr. Drewer on a plane flight that was lost over the sea.

After Knap's demise, Lona married Floyd Corey, the town doctor, and the couple became the main focus of the show. Other characters included Clate Weathers, editor of the town newspaper, the upright and righteous Belinda Catherwood, and the happily married Laif and Millie Flaigle.

== Cast ==
- Jim Bannon as Mitch Fredericks (1954–1955)
- Doug Chandler as Sheriff Boylan (1954)
- Maurice Copeland as Dr. Floyd Corey (1953–1955)
- Arthur Peterson as Andy Anderson
- Brigid Daly Bazlen as Nellie Corey
- Bruce Dane as Roy Bettert Corey
- Frank Dane as Knap Drewer (1951–1953)
- Bernardine Flynn as Lona Drewer Corey (1951–55)
- Michael Golda as Dr. Floyd Corey (1950–1953)
- Lee Henry as Dr. Glen Bowden (1954)
- Philip Lord as Judge Sharp
- Tom Poston as Toby Winfield (1953)
- Russ Reed as Spec Bassett (1953)
- Elmira Roessler as Elmira Cleebe (1953)
- Win Stracke as Laif Flagle (1951–1952)
- Hope Summers as Belinda Catherwood (1951–1952)
- Ros Twohey as Millie Flagle (1953–1954)
- Art Van Harvey as Calvin Sperry (1954–1955)

== Production notes ==
Hawkins Falls was broadcast live from Chicago. Among the series announcers was Hugh Downs.

Two of the actors in the series, Art Van Harvey and Bernardine Flynn, had previously spent over a decade together as the title characters in the radio series Vic and Sade. On Hawkins Falls, the two were only briefly cast members together; although Flynn played Lona Drewer Corey for the entire duration of the show, Van Harvey only joined the cast in 1954.

== Reception ==
Billboard magazine compared it quite favorably with radio soaps, and called it "pleasurable viewing".

== Episode status ==
Out of the hundreds of episodes produced, only about 15 survive. Five episodes, dating from May 1953 through June 1955, survive on Kinescope at the Walter J. Brown Media Archives, University of Georgia.
