= Too Young to Go Steady =

American TV situation comedy (1959)

- Genre: Sitcom
- Created by: Ronald Alexander
- Starring: Brigid Bazlen; Donald Cook; Joan Bennett; Martin Huston; Lorna Gillam
- Country of origin: United States

Production
- Executive producer: David Susskind
- Producer: Ronald Alexander
- Production company: Talent Associates

Original release
- Network: NBC
- Release: May 14 – June 25, 1959

Too Young to Go Steady is an American television situation comedy that was broadcast on NBC from May 14, 1959, until June 25, 1959.

== Premise ==
Tom Blake, an attorney, and his wife, Mary, were the parents of teenagers Pam and John Blake. At age 14, Pam was "trying to make the transition from tomboy to young lady." She and her girlfriend, Timmy, dealt with feelings of love and infatuation. Tom and Mary "were generally understanding" as they raised their son and daughter. Topics of episodes included Pam's failing to win a part in her school's play.

== Cast ==
- Pam Blake - Brigid Bazlen
- Tom Blake - Donald Cook
- Mary Blake - Joan Bennett
- John Blake - Martin Huston
- Timmy Barnes - Lorna Gillam

== Pilot ==
Don Ameche was originally cast as Tom Blake. The New York Times reported one week before the premiere broadcast that Cook had replaced Ameche in the cast. The Times said, "It was reported that Mr. Ameche had withdrawn after a dispute over his authority to approve the scripts and the director of the show." Other actors in the pilot were Polly Rowles as Mary, Tuesday Weld as Pam, Doug Lambert as John, and Joyce Bulifant as Timmy. The pilot was financed by CBS.

== Production ==
Too Young to Go Steady was broadcast live in black and white from New York by Talent Associates in association with Screen Gems. David Susskind was the executive producer. Ronald Alexander created and produced the series and was one of its writers and one of its directors. Other directors included Frank Pacelli. and Peter Tewksbury. It was broadcast on Thursdays from 8:30 to 9 p.m. Eastern Time, replacing The Oldsmobile Theater (also known as Oldsmobile Music Theatre). General Foods and Oldsmobile were among the sponsors. Competition for the series included Yancy Derringer on CBS.

== Critical response ==
Ben Gross wrote in a review in the New York Daily News that Too Young to Go Steady was "pleasant mass or family entertainment". The review acknowledged that the family-themed concept was much like that of other TV shows, but it added that the writing made the show better than average. Gross also praised the four main actors, singling out Bazlen as "a standout".
