= I Spy (1955 TV series) =

- Starring: Raymond Massey
- Country of origin: United States
- Original language: English

Production
- Running time: 30 minutes

Original release
- Network: Syndicated
- Release: 1955 – 1956

I Spy is an American syndicated anthology television series created by Edward Montagne and Phil Reisman Jr. and made by Rean Productions, Inc. and Guild Films. It ran from 1955–56 for a total of 39 episodes.

Episodes depicted activities of spies from a variety of locales and eras. The series starred Raymond Massey as Anton, the Spymaster. He began and ended each episode and narrated. Other actors who appeared in the series included Royal Beal, Donald Buka, Bob Ellenstein, Florence Henderson, and Joyce Lear.

Montagne was the producer and director; Reisman was the associate producer and script editor. Eugene W. Gutowski was the production supervisor. Freelance writers provided scripts.

I Spy was filmed in New York.
