= My Son Jeep =

American radio and TV situation comedy series

My Son Jeep is an American situation comedy that ran on NBC Radio January 25, 1953 - June 14, 1953 and was revived on CBS Radio October 3, 1955 – November 9, 1956. A television version ran on NBC July 4, 1953 - September 22, 1953, preceded by a "sneak preview" on June 3, 1953.

== Radio ==
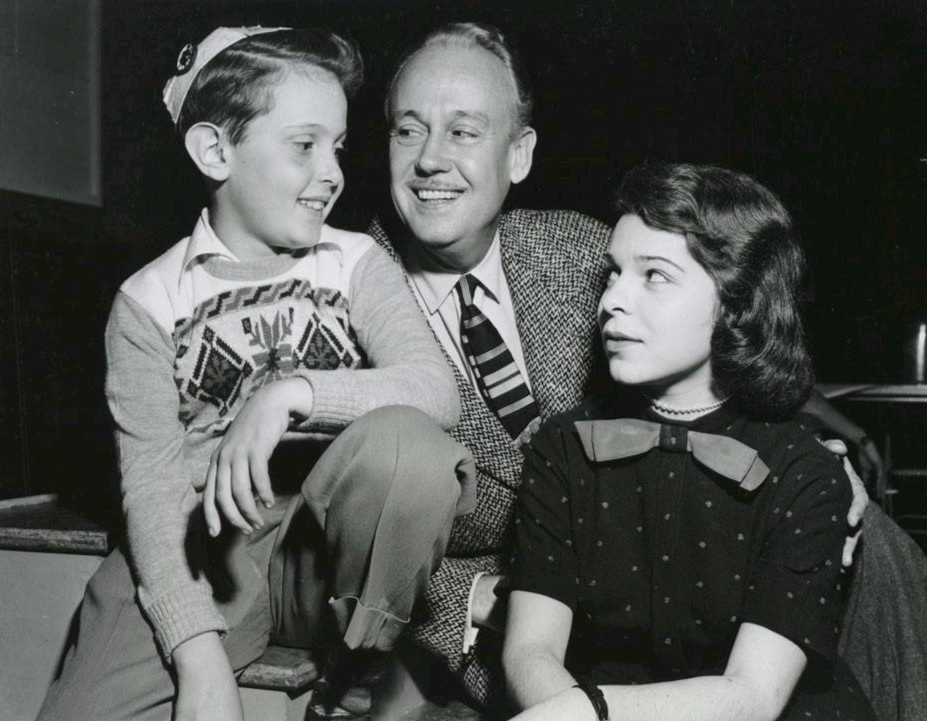
Radio cast of the program. From left: Bobby Alford ("Jeep" Allison), Paul McGrath (Dr. Martin Allison), and Joan Lazer (Peggy Allison).

=== Format ===
The program focused on the family of Robert Allison, a doctor in the small town of Grove Falls. Widower Allison tried to raise his children, Peggy and 10-year-old Jeep, by himself. Mrs. Bixby was the Allisons' maid. Barbara Miller was the receptionist in the doctor's office and his "low-key romantic interest".

The main character's nickname resulted from his fascination with a Jeep that he saw in a parade. His sister wanted to be called "Margaret", thinking that it had a more grown-up sound than "Peggy".

Dr. Allison narrated the episodes.

=== Cast ===
- Jeep Allison - Martin Huston and Bobby Alford
- Dr. Robert Allison - Donald Cook and Paul McGrath
- Peggy Allison - Joan Lazer
- Barbara Miller - Lynn Allen and Joyce Gordon
- Mrs. Bixby - Leona Powers

=== Production ===
The program was broadcast on Sundays from 7:30 to 8 p.m. Eastern Time until April 1953, when it was moved to the 7 - 7:30 p.m. E. T. slot.

=== Revived version ===
In October 1955, My Son Jeep was revived in a 15-minute version that ran weeknights at 8 p.m. E. T. That version was later moved to 9 p.m. E. T. Singer Don Cherry was a guest star, playing himself on the March 9, 1956, episode.

== Television ==
My Son Jeep
- Genre: Sitcom
- Starring: Jeffrey Lynn; Martin Huston
- Country of origin: United States
- Original language: English
- No. of seasons: 1

Original release
- Network: NBC
- Release: July 4, 1953 – September 22, 1963

=== Format ===
The format was essentially the same as that of the radio program. One source noted that Peggy's age was 13 and that Miller's work as a receptionist was part-time, as she was also a substitute teacher. Boots was Jeep's best friend and a frequent accomplice in getting into trouble.

=== Cast ===
- Jeep Allison - Huston
- Dr. Robert Allison - Jeffrey Lynn
- Peggy Allison - Betty Lou Keim
- Barbara Miller - Anne Sargent
- Mrs. Bixby - Powers
- Tommy Clifford - William Lally
- Boots - Richard Wigginton

=== Production ===
My Son Jeep was produced by Rockhill and Jeep Productions, with Hudson Faussett as the producer. Grey Lockwood was the director. Walter Black and William Mendreck were the writers. My Son Jeep initially was broadcast on Saturdays from 7:30 to 8 p.m. E. T. Beginning September 1, 1953 it was moved to Tuesdays from 8 to 8:30 p.m. E. T. An early broadcast occurred on June 5, 1953, when pre-emption of the hour-long Kraft Television Theatre by a half-hour presidential broadcast left NBC with 30 minutes to fill. Reaction to that broadcast led to NBC's putting the show on the air on a sustaining basis as the summer replacement for Ethel and Albert.

The Library of Congress contains one episode of the show.

=== Critical response ===
A review of the June 3, 1953, episode in The New York Times called it "a genuinely amusing video version of the radio show". The review complimented Huston's portrayal of Jeep and said that the episode "was blessed with some good writing, a most engaging cast, and a tongue-in-cheek attitude." Although the show focused on the boy, the adults in the episode drew compliments, too.

A review of the same episode in the trade publication Variety said that Lynn's portrayal of the father had "an air of warmth and ease", while Huston played Jeep as "a study in eagerness, enthusiasm, indifference and all the other attributes of a 10-year-old." The review also complimented the work of the rest of the cast, the pace of the directing, the camerawork, and the overall production.
