= Light's Diamond Jubilee =

1954 TV special

- Written by: Mark Twain; G. K. Chesterton; John Steinbeck; David O. Selznick; Ben Hecht; Irwin Shaw; Max Shulman
- Directed by: King Vidor; William Wellman; Norman Taurog; Christian Nyby; Roy Rowland; Alan Handley; Bud Yorkin
- Presented by: George Gobel
- Starring: Lauren Bacall; Robert Benchley (archive footage); Joseph Cotten; Dorothy Dandridge; Kim Novak; David Niven; Debbie Reynolds; Judith Anderson; Helen Hayes; Brandon deWilde; Eddie Fisher; Erin O'Brien-Moore; Walter Brennan; Dwight D. Eisenhower
- Music by: Victor Young
- Country of origin: United States

Production
- Producer: David O. Selznick
- Running time: 120 minutes

Original release
- Network: DuMont; CBS; NBC; ABC
- Release: October 24, 1954

Light's Diamond Jubilee (1954) is a two-hour TV special that aired on October 24, 1954, on all four U.S. television networks of the time, DuMont, CBS, NBC, and ABC. The special won a Primetime Emmy Award for Victor Young for Best Music for a Variety or Dramatic series.

The special was produced by David O. Selznick, had seven directors, and featured major stars of the day. The special was sponsored by General Electric in honor of the 75th anniversary of the invention of the incandescent light bulb by Thomas Edison. In 1929, a previous celebration of "light's golden jubilee" was produced by General Electric and created by PR pioneer Edward Bernays.

Robert Benchley's appearance was a segment from his MGM short film How to Raise a Baby (1938).

== Episode status ==
A copy of the CBS Television version of the broadcast, showing a copyright notice of Selznick Releasing Organization Inc., is in the collection of the UCLA Film and Television Archive. The Library of Congress has copies available for viewing by appointment.

== See also ==
- List of programs broadcast by the DuMont Television Network
- List of surviving DuMont Television Network broadcasts
- General Foods 25th Anniversary Show: A Salute to Rodgers and Hammerstein (March 1954 TV special aired on all four American TV networks)

== Bibliography ==
- David Weinstein, The Forgotten Network: DuMont and the Birth of American Television (Philadelphia: Temple University Press, 2004) ISBN 1-59213-245-6
- Alex McNeil, Total Television, Fourth edition (New York: Penguin Books, 1980) ISBN 0-14-024916-8
- Tim Brooks and Earle Marsh, The Complete Directory to Prime Time Network TV Shows, Third edition (New York: Ballantine Books, 1964) ISBN 0-345-31864-1
