= General Foods 25th Anniversary Show: A Salute to Rodgers and Hammerstein =

- Directed by: Ralph Levy
- Starring: Mary Martin; Groucho Marx; Jack Benny; John Raitt; Gordon MacRae; Florence Henderson; Ed Sullivan; Edgar Bergen; Ezio Pinza; Yul Brynner; Janice Rule; Patricia Morison
- Music by: Richard Rodgers; Oscar Hammerstein
- Country of origin: United States

Production
- Producer: Ralph Levy
- Running time: 120 mins.

Original release
- Network: DuMont; CBS; NBC; ABC
- Release: March 28, 1954

General Foods 25th Anniversary Show: A Salute to Rodgers and Hammerstein is a two-hour TV special broadcast live on March 28, 1954, on all four major TV networks of the time, DuMont, CBS, NBC, and ABC.

The special was hosted by Groucho Marx, Mary Martin, Jack Benny, Ed Sullivan, and Edgar Bergen with his puppet Charlie McCarthy.

The performance of the segment from the musical Oklahoma! was the first time that actress Florence Henderson appeared on television.

== Songs ==
Sources:

- "Oklahoma" from Oklahoma! – Gordon MacRae, Florence Henderson, and chorus
- "It Might as Well Be Spring" from State Fair (1945) – Mary Martin
- "If I Loved You" from Carousel – John Raitt, Jan Clayton
- "Soliloquy" from Carousel – John Raitt
- "You Are Never Away" from Allegro – Bill Hayes and Janice Rule
- "I'm Gonna Wash That Man Right Outa My Hair" from South Pacific – Mary Martin and chorus
- "Some Enchanted Evening" from South Pacific – Mary Martin and Ezio Pinza
- "A Puzzlement" from The King and I – Yul Brynner
- "Oh, What a Beautiful Mornin'" from Oklahoma! – Gordon MacRae
- "I'm in Love with a Wonderful Guy" from South Pacific – Mary Martin
- "Getting to Know You" from The King and I – Patricia Morison
- "The Big Black Giant" and "No Other Love" from Me and Juliet – Rosemary Clooney, Tony Martin
- "People Will Say We're in Love" from Oklahoma! – Gordon MacRae, Florence Henderson

== See also ==
- List of programs broadcast by the DuMont Television Network
- List of surviving DuMont Television Network broadcasts
- Light's Diamond Jubilee (October 1954 special aired on all four American TV networks)

== Bibliography ==
- David Weinstein, The Forgotten Network: DuMont and the Birth of American Television (Philadelphia: Temple University Press, 2004) ISBN 1-59213-245-6
- Alex McNeil, Total Television, Fourth edition (New York: Penguin Books, 1980) ISBN 0-14-024916-8
- Tim Brooks and Earle Marsh, The Complete Directory to Prime Time Network TV Shows, Third edition (New York: Ballantine Books, 1964) ISBN 0-345-31864-1
