= Diagnosis: Unknown =

- Genre: Medical drama
- Created by: Alan Woods; James A. Bank, based on "Diagnosis: Homicide" by Lawrence G. Blochman
- Written by: Joel Carpenter; Arnold Manoff; Bill S. Ballinger; Elliott Norman; Steven Gethers; Theodore Apstein; Alvin Boretz; Ernest Kinoy
- Directed by: Fielder Cook; Paul Stanley; William Corrigan
- Starring: Patrick O'Neal; Phyllis Newman; Chester Morris; Martin Huston; Cal Bellini
- Theme music composer: Irwin Kostal; Edward Scott; Joe Hamilton
- Opening theme: "Diagnosis: Unknown" (aka "Coffee's Theme")
- Composer: Irwin Kostal
- Country of origin: United States
- Original language: English
- No. of seasons: 1
- No. of episodes: 9

Production
- Executive producer: Bob Banner
- Producer: Leo Davis
- Running time: 45–48 minutes
- Production companies: Bob Banner Associates, Inc. Red Wing Productions, Inc. CBS Television

Original release
- Network: CBS
- Release: July 5 – September 20, 1960

Diagnosis: Unknown is an American medical drama that aired on CBS television from July 5 to September 20, 1960. The series aired as a summer replacement for The Garry Moore Show from 10 to 11 p.m. on Tuesdays.

== Premise ==
Daniel Coffee, head of a hospital's pathology lab, worked with police (particularly Detective Captain Max Ritter) to find criminals who committed bizarre murders. Lab assistants Doris Hudson and Motilal Mookerju supported Coffee in his work. Another regular character was Link, a boy who worked as handyman and kept the lab clean.

== Personnel ==
Bob Banner was the producer. Joel Carpenter wrote the script for the program's premiere episode.

=== Cast ===
- Patrick O'Neal as Coffee
- Phyllis Newman as Hudson
- Cal Bellini as Mookerji
- Martin Huston as Link
- Chester Morris as Ritter

== Theme ==
"Coffee's Theme", the program's theme song, was recorded by Warren Covington and the Tommy Dorsey Orchestra (Decca 31146).

== Critical reception ==
In a review of the program's initial episode in The New York Times, Jack Gould called the show "sick television" and said it indicated that "beatniks have taken over" at CBS. The review said that the show's "laboratory is populated by gone kids" and noted elements in the laboratory's environment: "haze of cigarette smoke... the din of transistor radios... jive talk".

Critic John Crosby wrote that he liked the emphasis on the mystery, and he complimented O'Neal's portrayal of Coffee. He liked the dialogue's "intelligence and flashes of humor" but added that some scenes were "awfully talky" while others were "pretty awkward".

== Episodes ==
No.	Title	Directed by	Written by	Original release date
1	"A Case of Radiant Wine"	Fielder Cook	Joel Carpenter	July 5, 1960
Guest star: Tom Bosley
2	"Main Course -- Murder"	Unknown	Unknown	August 2, 1960
3	"A Sudden Stillness"	Unknown	Unknown	August 9, 1960
4	"Final Performance"	Unknown	Unknown	August 16, 1960
5	"The Case of the Elder"	Unknown	Unknown	August 23, 1960
6	"The Curse of the Gypsy"	Unknown	Unknown	August 30, 1960
7	"Gina, Gina"	Unknown	Unknown	September 6, 1960
8	"The Parasite"	Unknown	Unknown	September 13, 1960
9	"The Red Death"	Unknown	Unknown	September 20, 1960
