= Victor Young =

American violinist, composer and conductor (1899–1956)

- Victor Young

Background information
- Born: Albert Victor Young; August 8, 1899; Chicago, Illinois, U.S.
- Died: November 10, 1956 (aged 57) Palm Springs, California, U.S.
- Occupations: Composer; arranger; violinist; conductor
- Instruments: Violin; piano
- Years active: 1920–56

Albert Victor Young (August 8, 1899– November 10, 1956) was an American composer, arranger, violinist, and conductor. He was posthumously awarded the Academy Award for Best Music Score of a Dramatic or Comedy Picture for Around the World in 80 Days at the 29th Academy Awards in 1957.

== Biography ==
Young was reportedly born in Chicago on August 8, 1900, but per U.S. Census data and his birth certificate, he was born in 1899. His grave marker shows 1901 as his birth year. He was born into a very musical Jewish family; his father was a tenor with Joseph Sheehan's touring opera company. However, his father abandoned the family after Young's mother died.

The young Victor, who had begun playing violin at the age of six, was sent to Poland when he was 10 to stay with his grandfather and study at Warsaw Imperial Conservatory (taught by Polish composer Roman Statkowski), where he earned the Diploma of Merit. He also studied piano with Isidor Philipp of the Paris Conservatory. While still a teenager, he embarked on a career as a concert violinist with the Warsaw Philharmonic under assistant conductor Juliusz Wertheim in 1915–16.

When Young graduated from the Warsaw Conservatory, World War I prevented him from returning to the United States. He remained in Poland (then under German occupation), partly earning his keep by playing with the Philharmonic and in a quartet and a quintet. He also gave lessons. His future wife, Rita Kinel, who met him in late 1918, used to smuggle food to him since he could not afford it.

He returned to Chicago in 1920 to join the orchestra at Central Park Casino, then traveled to Los Angeles to join Kinel. He first worked as a fiddler in impresario Sid Grauman's Million Dollar Theatre Orchestra and was later appointed concertmaster for Paramount-Publix Theatres. After turning to popular music, Young worked as a violinist-arranger for Ted Fio Rito.

In 1930, Chicago bandleader and radio star Isham Jones commissioned Young to write an instrumental ballad band arrangement of Hoagy Carmichael's "Stardust", which until then had been played as an up-tempo number. Young slowed it down and played the melody as a gorgeous romantic violin solo, which inspired Mitchell Parish to write lyrics for what then became a much-performed love song. Bing Crosby recorded it at least three times: in 1931, 1939, and 1942.

In the mid-1930s, he moved to Hollywood, where he concentrated on films, recordings of light music, and backing for popular singers, including Bing Crosby. His composer credits include "When I Fall in Love", "Blue Star (The Medic Theme)", "Moonlight Serenade (Summer Love)" from the motion picture The Star (1952), "Sweet Sue, Just You", "Can't We Talk It Over", "Street of Dreams", "Love Letters", "Around the World", "My Foolish Heart", "Golden Earrings", "Stella by Starlight", "Delilah", "Johnny Guitar", and "I Don't Stand a Ghost of a Chance with You".

== Records ==
Young was signed to Brunswick in 1931, where his studio groups recorded scores of popular dance music, waltzes, and semiclassics through 1934. His studio groups often contained some of the best jazz musicians in New York, including Bunny Berigan, Tommy Dorsey, Jimmy Dorsey, Joe Venuti, Arthur Schutt, Eddie Lang, and others. He used first-rate vocalists, including Paul Small, Dick Robertson, Harlan Lattimore, Smith Ballew, Helen Rowland, Frank Munn, the Boswell Sisters, Lee Wiley, and others.

One of his most interesting recordings was the January 22, 1932, session containing songs written by Herman Hupfeld: "Goopy Geer (He Plays Piano And He Plays By Ear)" and "Down the Old Back Road", on which Hupfeld sang and played piano (his only two known vocals).

In late 1934, Young signed with Decca. He continued recording in New York until mid-1936, when he relocated to Los Angeles.

== Radio, film and television ==
On radio, Young was musical director of The Old Gold Don Ameche Show and Harvest of Stars. He was musical director for many of Bing Crosby's recordings for the American branch of Decca Records, for which he also conducted the first album of songs from the 1939 film The Wizard of Oz, a "presoundtrack" cover version rather than a true soundtrack album. The album featured Judy Garland and the Ken DarbySingers singing songs from the film in Young's own arrangements. Young often collaborated with Ken Darby and the Singers for radio programs starring popular Met Opera baritone John Charles Thomsen; he also composed music for several Decca spoken-word albums.

Young received 22 Academy Award nominations for his work in film. He was twice nominated four times in a single year, but did not win an Oscar during his lifetime. Young received his only Oscar posthumously for his score of Around the World in Eighty Days (1956). Thus, Victor Young holds the record for most Oscar nominations before winning his first award.

His other nominated scores include Anything Goes (1936), The Big Broadcast of 1937 (1936), Artists and Models (1937), The Gladiator (1938), Golden Boy (1939), For Whom the Bell Tolls (1943), The Uninvited (1944), Love Letters (1945), So Evil My Love (1948), The Emperor Waltz (1948), The Paleface (1948), Samson and Delilah (1949), A Connecticut Yankee in King Arthur's Court (1949), Gun Crazy (1950), Our Very Own (1950), September Affair (1950), My Favorite Spy (1951), Payment on Demand (1951), The Quiet Man (1952), Scaramouche (1952), Something to Live For (1952), Shane (1953), The Country Girl (1954), A Man Alone (1955), The Conqueror (1956), and The Maverick Queen (1956).

He contributed two tone poems, "White" and "Black", to the 1956 album Frank Sinatra Conducts Tone Poems of Color.

His last scores were for the 1957 films Omar Khayyam, Run of the Arrow, and China Gate, which were released after his death. The last was left unfinished at the time of his death and was completed by his longtime friend Max Steiner.

"The Call of the Faraway Hills", which Young composed for the film Shane, was also used as the theme for the U.S. TV series Shane.

Young won a Primetime Emmy Award for his scoring of the TV special Light's Diamond Jubilee, which aired October 24, 1954, on all four major U.S. television networks.

As an occasional bit player, Young can be glimpsed briefly in The Country Girl (1954), playing a recording studio leader conducting Bing Crosby while he tapes "The Search is Through (You've Got What It Takes).“

== Death ==
Young died at age 57 on November 10, 1956, in Palm Springs, California, following a cerebral haemorrhage. He is interred in the Beth Olam Mausoleum in Hollywood Forever Cemetery, Hollywood, California. Dr. Max Nussbaum, rabbi of Temple Israel, Hollywood, officiated. His family donated his artifacts and memorabilia (including his Oscar) to Brandeis University.

== Broadway ==
- Murder at the Vanities (1933) – musical – contributing composer
- Blackbirds of 1933 (1933) – revue – featured songwriter
- Arms and the Girl (1950) – musical – performer for the role of "Son of Liberty"
- Pardon Our French (1950) – revue – composer
- Seventh Heaven (1955) – musical – composer

== Awards and nominations ==
=== Academy Awards ===
Year	Film	Category	Result
1939	Breaking the Ice	Best Original Score	Nominated
1939	Army Girl	Best Original Score	Nominated
1940	Man of Conquest	Best Original Score	Nominated
1940	Gulliver's Travels	Best Original Score	Nominated
1940	Golden Boy	Best Original Score	Nominated
1940	Way Down South	Best Music (Scoring)	Nominated
1941	North West Mounted Police	Best Original Score	Nominated
1941	Dark Command	Best Original Score	Nominated
1941	Arizona	Best Original Score	Nominated
1941	Arise, My Love	Best Music, Score	Nominated
1942	Hold Back the Dawn	Best Scoring of a Dramatic Picture	Nominated
1943	Take a Letter, Darling	Best Scoring of a Dramatic or Comedy Picture	Nominated
1943	Silver Queen	Best Scoring of a Dramatic or Comedy Picture	Nominated
1943	Flying Tigers	Best Scoring of a Dramatic or Comedy Picture	Nominated
1944	For Whom the Bell Tolls	Best Scoring of a Dramatic or Comedy Picture	Nominated
1946	Love Letters	Best Original Song for "Love Letters" (shared with Edward Heyman)	Nominated
1946	Love Letters	Best Scoring of a Dramatic or Comedy Picture	Nominated
1949	The Emperor Waltz	Best Scoring of a Musical Picture	Nominated
1950	My Foolish Heart	Best Original Song for "My Foolish Heart" (shared with Ned Washington)	Nominated
1951	Samson and Delilah	Best Scoring of a Dramatic or Comedy Picture	Nominated
1957	Around the World in 80 Days	Best Scoring of a Dramatic or Comedy Picture	Won
1957	Written on the Wind	Best Original Song for "Written on the Wind" (shared with Sammy Cahn)	Nominated

=== Golden Globes ===
Year	Film	Category	Result
1952	September Affair	Best Original Score	Won
1953	The Quiet Man	Best Original Score	Nominated

=== Primetime Emmy Awards ===
Year	Project	Category	Result
1955	Light's Diamond Jubilee	Best Scoring of a Dramatic or Variety Program	Won
1955	Medic	Best Original Music Composed for TV	Nominated
1955	Light's Diamond Jubilee	Best Original Music Composed for TV	Nominated
