= Warren Leslie =

American writer (1927–2011)

Warren Leslie (May 3, 1927 – July 6, 2011) was an American author, journalist, and business executive.

== Early life and career ==
Born in Manhattan, he served in the United States Marines during World War II and was educated at Yale University. He began his career as a reporter for The Dallas Morning News. He then became an executive at Neiman Marcus where he ultimately became vice president and chief spokesman for the company. He also worked as an executive for Revlon and operated his own public relations firm in New York City. He was married 4 times to 3 women, twice to Bonnie Titley Leslie, was then widowed by Revlon executive Kay Daly, and adopted her three sons. He was married to Carol Corbett-Leslie until his death in 2011.

== Works ==
While working for Neiman Marcus, Leslie published Dallas Public and Private: Aspects of an American City in April 1964. The controversial work profiled the city of Dallas in light of the assassination of John F. Kennedy just four months after the tragic event, and was highly critical of the conservative political culture of Dallas.

Leslie published the novels The Best Thing That Ever Happened (1952), Love or Whatever It Is (1960), Under The Skin (1970) and The Starrs of Texas (1978). He also co-authored scripts for the soap opera The Secret Storm with his sister, the actress and writer Bethel Leslie.

== Death ==
He died in Chicago in 2011 at the age of 84. He was survived by one son, Michael Leslie; two adopted sons, Richard Bradford and Kelly Bradford, two stepsons, Sidney Corbett and David Corbett, grandchildren Jason Leslie & Kelly Leslie, Anne Bradford, Chase Bradford, Rory Bradford, William Bradford, Charlie Corbett, Josef Corbett; great-grandson, Jayden Valentine; and two great-granddaughters, Malavaya Leslie & Dallas Leslie. He was preceded in death by his son, Warren Leslie IV.
