= Alan Handley =

American businessman

- Born: March 11, 1912; Indiana, U.S.
- Died: January 5, 1990 (aged 77); Los Angeles, California, U.S.
- Occupations: actor, television director, television producer novelist
- Years active: 1936-1975

Alan Handley (March 11, 1912 – January 5, 1990) was an American producer and director of television programmes. In 1966, he was awarded the Emmy in the category "Outstanding Directorial Achievement in Variety or Music" for his work on The Julie Andrews Show (1965).

== Stage career ==
In the 1930s, Handley acted in a number of theatrical productions, on and off Broadway. His acting career came to an end with the advent of World War II, during which he served in the Army Engineers.

== Television career ==
Handley's career as a television producer at NBC was initially most marked by his work on The Dinah Shore Show (1951–1957). Walter Ames, television critic for the Los Angeles Times, referred to him as "Dinah Shore's guardian angel".

His directorial debut was in 1954, as one of the seven directors to work on the television spectacular Light's Diamond Jubilee, a celebration of the 75th anniversary of the invention of the incandescent light bulb.

He was director of the telecasts of the 30th, 31st and 32nd Academy Awards (1958–1960).

== Writing career ==
In 1948, Handley's whodunnit novel Kiss Your Elbow was first published. Its setting is the New York theatrical scene. To mark their sixtieth anniversary in 2009, Harlequin NA republished Kiss Your Elbow as one of their six earliest books, with the original text and cover art.

Handley died of a heart attack at the age of 77.
