= Saint Tropez (disco group) =

- Years active: 1970s - 1980s
- Labels: Butterfly Records, Destiny Records, Baby Records, Destiny Productions
- Past members: Carmen Twillie; Ida Boros; Jean-Paul Vignon; Laurin Rinder; Lisa Roberts; Louis Aldebert; Lyndie White; Marilyn Jackson; Mona Lisa Young; Monique D'Ozo; Myrna Matthews; Pam Feener; Phyllis Rhodes; Suzanne Mireille; Venette Gloud; W. Michael Lewis

Saint Tropez was a disco group active during the 1970s and 1980s who had success with the single, "One More Minute". They also had other hits as well as album chart success.

== Background ==
Saint Tropez was a creation of producers, W. Michael Lewis and Laurin Rinder. It featured female vocalists that included Pat Feener, Debra Pratt and Nancy Texidor, and occasionally Jean-Paul Vignon.

The group's hit period lasted from 1977 to 1983 with the hits "Je t'aime / Violation / On a rien à perdre", "One More Minute", " Fill My Life with Love", "I Want to Do Something Freaky to You", medley; "The Love Stealers" / "I've Been Watching You" / "I Want to Do Something Freaky to You", "Femmes Fatales" and "Morning Music".

== Career ==
=== 1970s ===
The group recorded for the Butterfly Records label. With the label being just six months old, it had released two albums, Je T'Aime by Saint Tropez and Just Folks ... A Firesign Chat by Firesign Theatre.

==== Belle de Jour album ====
The group's follow up album was Belle De Jour was released in 1978. It was mentioned by Brian Chin in the 3 February 1979 issue of Record World. He noted Jean-Paul Vignon's vocals on the slower Barry White-influenced tracks as well as the three female vocalists, Pat Feener, Debra Pratt and Nancy Texidor who were highlighted on the prime disco tracks. He singled out the tracks, "Fill My Life", mentioning the bongo, tambourine and occasional synthesizer rumbles, and "One More Minute" with its up-front jumpy clavinet and wah-wah alternation.

One track on the album, "Hold on to Love" was originally by Page Three (band) and a hit for them in 1977.

==== "One More Minute" ====
"Fill My Life with Love" / "One More Minute" debuted at no. 23 in the Record World Disco File Top 30 chart for the week of 24 February 1979. For the week of 17 March, the chart had changed its name to Disco File Top 40. "Fill My Life with Love" / "One More Minute" was at its second week at no. 16.

For the week of 16 April, "One More Minute" / "Fill My Life" peaked at no. 7 on the RMR Weekly Disco Clubs chart.

For the week of 21 April with "One More Minute" on its own, and with the Record World chart now called Disco File Top 50, it was at no. 15.

"One More Minute" was one of the Record World Single Picks in the magazine's 21 April issue. The reviewer said that the Dave Jordan and Barry Blue composition kicked off Saint Tropez' new album with great style, and with the female vocals being the focal point, the disc was ready for radio and disco action.

For the week of 5 May, "One More Minute" debuted at no. 89 in the Record World singles chart. By 26 May it was at no. 60.

==== Further activities ====
The girls from Saint Tropez had been pictured on the cover of the March 1979 issue of Oui magazine and were featured in a ten-page spread.

It was reported in the 29 June 1979 issue of Radio & Record News that Chrysalis was handling the releases of Saint Tropez albums, Je T'Aime and Belle de Jour which was currently a hit album in the US. The group's single, "One More Minute" was released in the US in both 7" and 12" formats. The publicity for the release was enhanced when the male member of the group, Jean Paul Vignon joined the female members of the group in a spicy photo shoot described by the writer as "Look at my suntan".

=== 1980s ===
In January 1982 the group released their Hot and Nasty album, which was produced by W. Michael Lewis and Laurin Rinder for Rinlew Productions.

The female members of the ensemble were pictured on the front cover of the 10 July 1982 issue of Cash Box. According to the magazine, the group looked as sultry as a Helmut Newton photograph. They had also caused quite a stir with the racey cover of their album which was released on the Destiny label.
