= Florence Henderson =

American actress (1934–2016)

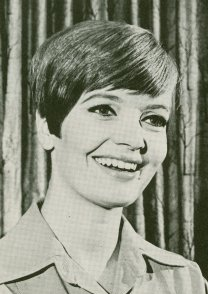
- Henderson in 1967
- Born: February 14, 1934; Dale, Indiana, U.S.
- Died: November 24, 2016 (aged 82); Los Angeles, California, U.S.
- Burial place: Westwood Village Memorial Park
- Education: American Academy of Dramatic Arts
- Occupations: Actress; singer
- Years active: 1952–2016
- Known for: Carol Brady in The Brady Bunch; Fanny; A Very Brady Christmas; The Bradys
- Spouses: Ira Bernstein (m. 1956; div. 1985) John Kappas (m. 1987; died 2002)
- Children: 4
- Awards: TV Land Pop Culture Award

Florence Agnes Henderson (February 14, 1934 – November 24, 2016) was an American singer and actress. With a career spanning six decades, she is best known for her starring role as Carol Brady on the ABC sitcom The Brady Bunch. Henderson also appeared in film, as well as on stage, and hosted several long-running cooking and variety shows over the years. She appeared as a guest on many scripted and unscripted (talk and reality show) television programs and as a panelist on numerous game shows. Henderson was also a contestant on Dancing with the Stars in 2010.

Henderson hosted her own talk show, The Florence Henderson Show, and cooking show, Who's Cooking with Florence Henderson, on Retirement Living TV during the years leading up to her death at age 82 on Thanksgiving 2016 from heart failure.

== Early life ==
Henderson, the youngest of 10 children, was born on February 14, 1934, in Dale, Indiana, a small town in the southwestern part of the state. She was a daughter of Elizabeth (née Elder), a homemaker, and Joseph Henderson, a tobacco sharecropper. During the Great Depression, she was taught to sing at the age of two by her mother, who had a repertoire of 50 songs. By the time she was eight, her family called her "Florency," and by age 12, she was singing at local grocery stores.

Henderson graduated from St. Francis Academy in Owensboro, Kentucky, in 1951 and shortly thereafter went to New York City, enrolling in the American Academy of Dramatic Arts. She was an Alumna Initiate of the Alpha Chi chapter of Delta Zeta sorority.

== Career ==
Henderson started her career on the stage performing in musicals, such as the touring production of Oklahoma! and South Pacific at Lincoln Center.

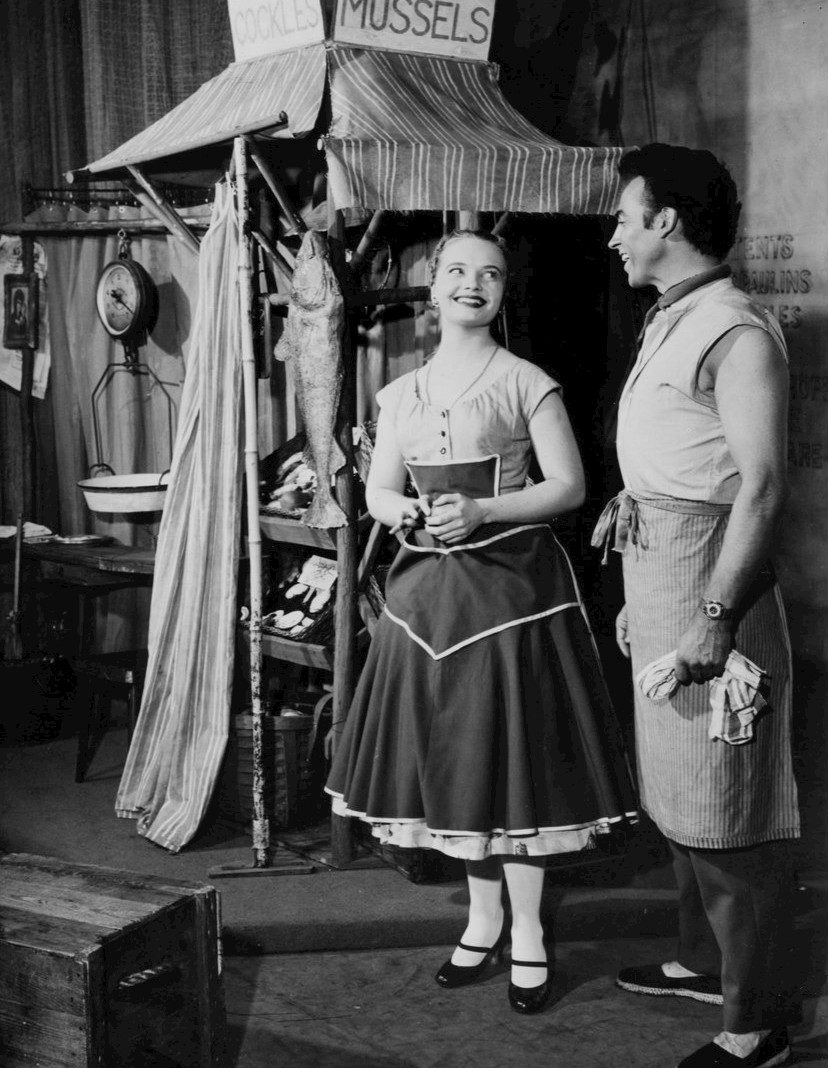
Florence Henderson and William Tabbert from the Broadway production of Fanny (1955)

She debuted on Broadway in the musical Wish You Were Here in 1952, and later starred on Broadway in the long-running 1954 musical, Fanny (888 performances) in which she originated the title role. Henderson appeared with Gordon MacRae in the Oklahoma! segment of the 90-minute television special General Foods 25th Anniversary Show: A Salute to Rodgers and Hammerstein (1954). She later appeared in "The Abbe and the Nymph", an episode of the 1950s TV series I Spy (not to be confused with the 1960s series of the same name). She also portrayed Meg March in a CBS-TV musical adaptation of Little Women, which aired October 16, 1958.

Henderson appeared in two episodes of The United States Steel Hour. She portrayed Mary Jane in an episodic adaptation of Adventures of Huckleberry Finn, which aired on November 20, 1957. She also appeared in "A Family Alliance", an episodic adaptation of a short story from A Harvest of Stories (1956) by Dorothy Canfield Fisher, which aired on June 4, 1958.

Henderson, along with Bill Hayes, appeared in the Oldsmobile commercials from 1958 through 1961 on The Patti Page Show for which Oldsmobile was the sponsor. In 1959, she sang "Don't Let a Be-Back Get Away", in Good News About Olds, an industrial musical for Oldsmobile. Bill Hayes and she also gave a musical performance on the January 13, 1960, broadcast of Tonight Starring Jack Paar. Henderson also appeared on Broadway in The Girl Who Came to Supper (1963).

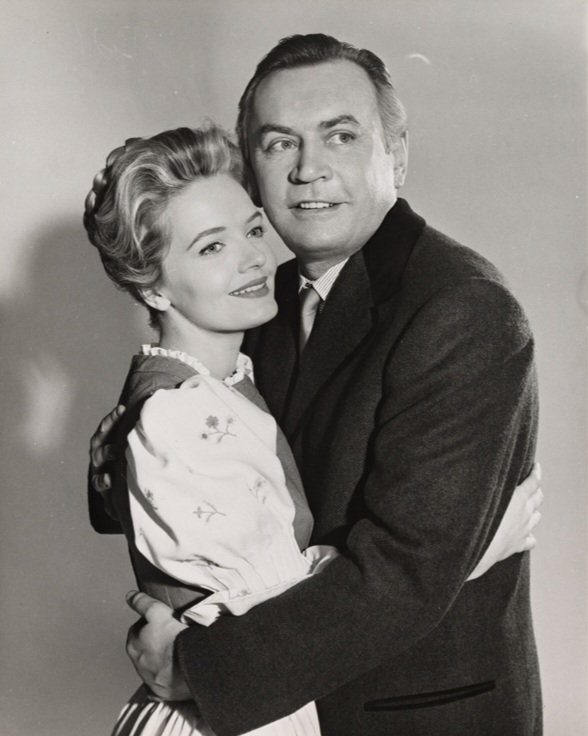
Florence Henderson and John Myhers from the Chicago production of The Sound of Music (1961)

In 1962, she won the Sarah Siddons Award for her work in Chicago theater, and the same year became the first woman to guest host The Tonight Show in the period after Jack Paar left as the show's host, and before Johnny Carson began his 30 years as the show's longest serving host in October 1962. She also joined the ranks of what was then called The Today Girl and often substituted for Dave Garroway on NBC's long-running morning show, doing weather and light news, a position also once held by Barbara Walters.

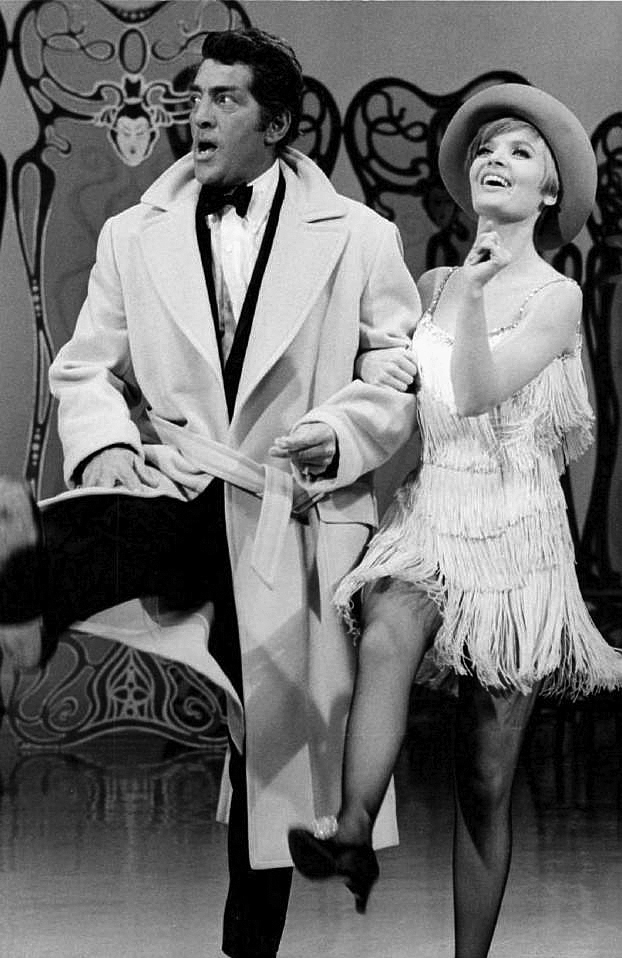
Dean Martin performing with Henderson on The Dean Martin Show, 1968

She gave later musical performances on Paar's subsequent talk show in 1963, including the January 25 and February 22 broadcasts. She performed in the May 19, 1963, broadcast of The Voice of Firestone, alongside baritone Mario Sereni. She also released her albums under RCA Victor as part of her music career.

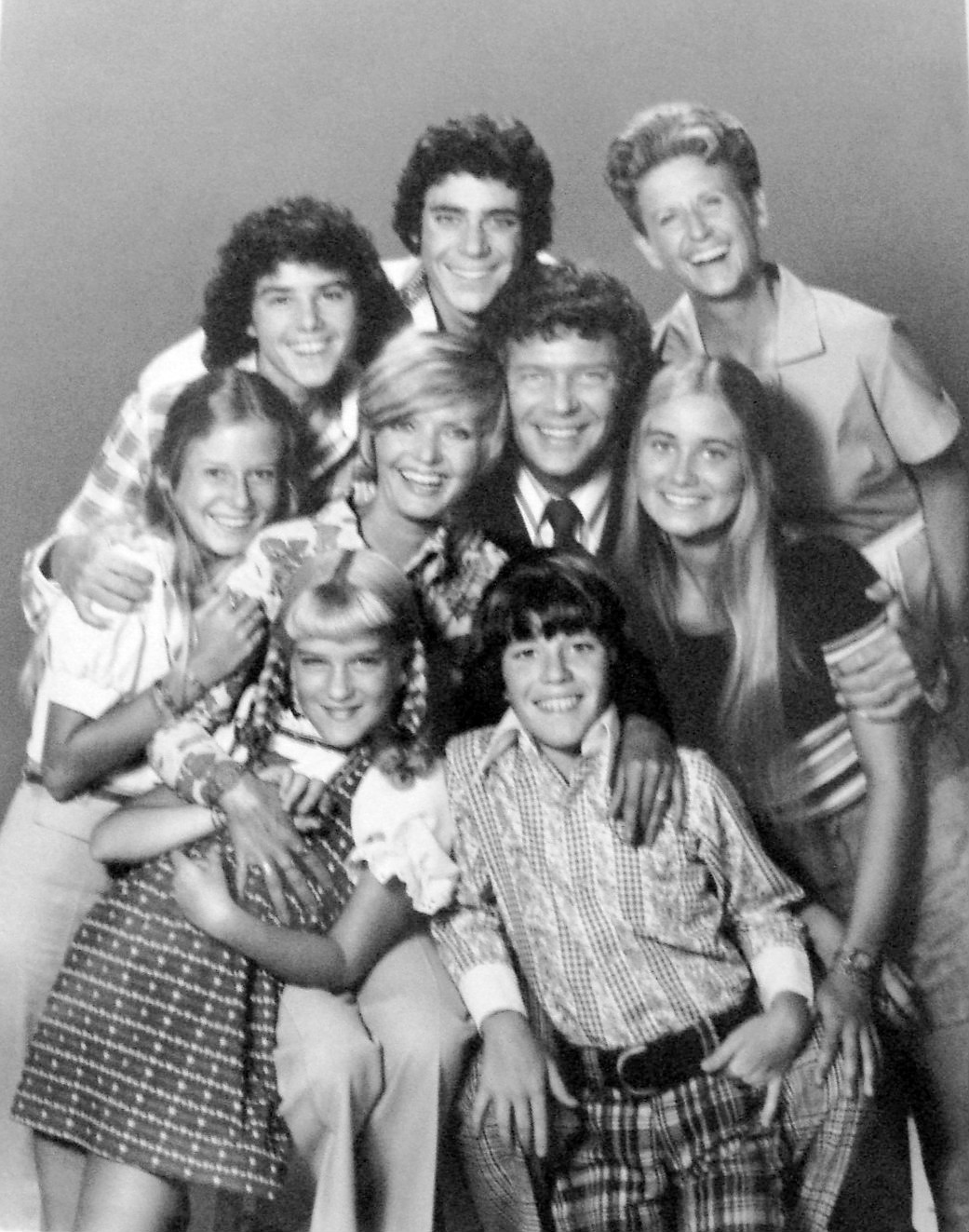
Cast photo from The Brady Bunch. Back (left to right): Christopher Knight (Peter), Barry Williams (Greg), Ann B. Davis (Alice). Second row: Eve Plumb (Jan), Florence Henderson (Carol), Robert Reed (Mike), Maureen McCormick (Marcia). Front: Susan Olsen (Cindy), Mike Lookinland (Bobby).

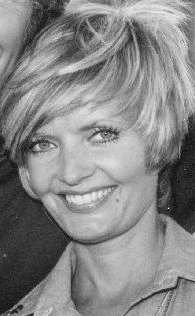
Henderson's most famous role was as Carol Brady – the mother on the classic 1970s sitcom The Brady Bunch.

Her most widely recognized role was as Carol Brady in The Brady Bunch, which aired on ABC from 1969 until 1974. Henderson's best friend, Shirley Jones, had turned down the role, but the following year, she accepted the similar role of a mother with five children, named Shirley Partridge, in The Partridge Family, which aired from 1970 to 1974.

Primarily owing to her role on The Brady Bunch, Henderson was ranked by TV Land and Entertainment Weekly as number 54 on their list of the 100 Greatest TV Icons.

An avid game-show fan, Henderson was a frequent panelist on the original version of Hollywood Squares and made occasional appearances on The $25,000 Pyramid. Her other game show appearances include Password, the original Match Game, What's My Line? (as a panelist and a mystery guest), To Tell the Truth, I've Got a Secret, Snap Judgment, Personality, The Magnificent Marble Machine, and Who Wants to Be a Millionaire?. She also appeared alongside her Brady Bunch co-star Robert Reed on the John Davidson-hosted version of Hollywood Squares and teamed with Reed, Maureen McCormick, Christopher Knight and Susan Olsen on one of the original Family Feud's All-Star weeks, where they finished in second place.

Henderson was the spokeswoman for Wesson cooking oil from 1974 to 1996. During that time, she hosted a cooking show on TNN, Country Kitchen, and did ads for Prange's, a Wisconsin department store chain. She appeared on The Love Boat S1 E11 "Divorce Me, Please" vignette as Audrey Baynes, who finds new appreciation for her husband, played by Shecky Greene (1977). She played Diane DeMarzo in The Love Boat S2 E11 "Captain's Cup" story (1978). Other guest appearances on the series are listed in the appended television chronology. Henderson co-hosted the short-lived NBC morning talk show Later Today (1999–2000), with Jodi Applegate and Asha Blake.

In the 2000s, she was the spokeswoman for Polident denture cleaner. In 2003, Henderson seemed to poke fun at her wholesome image by appearing in a Pepsi Twist television commercial with Ozzy Osbourne.

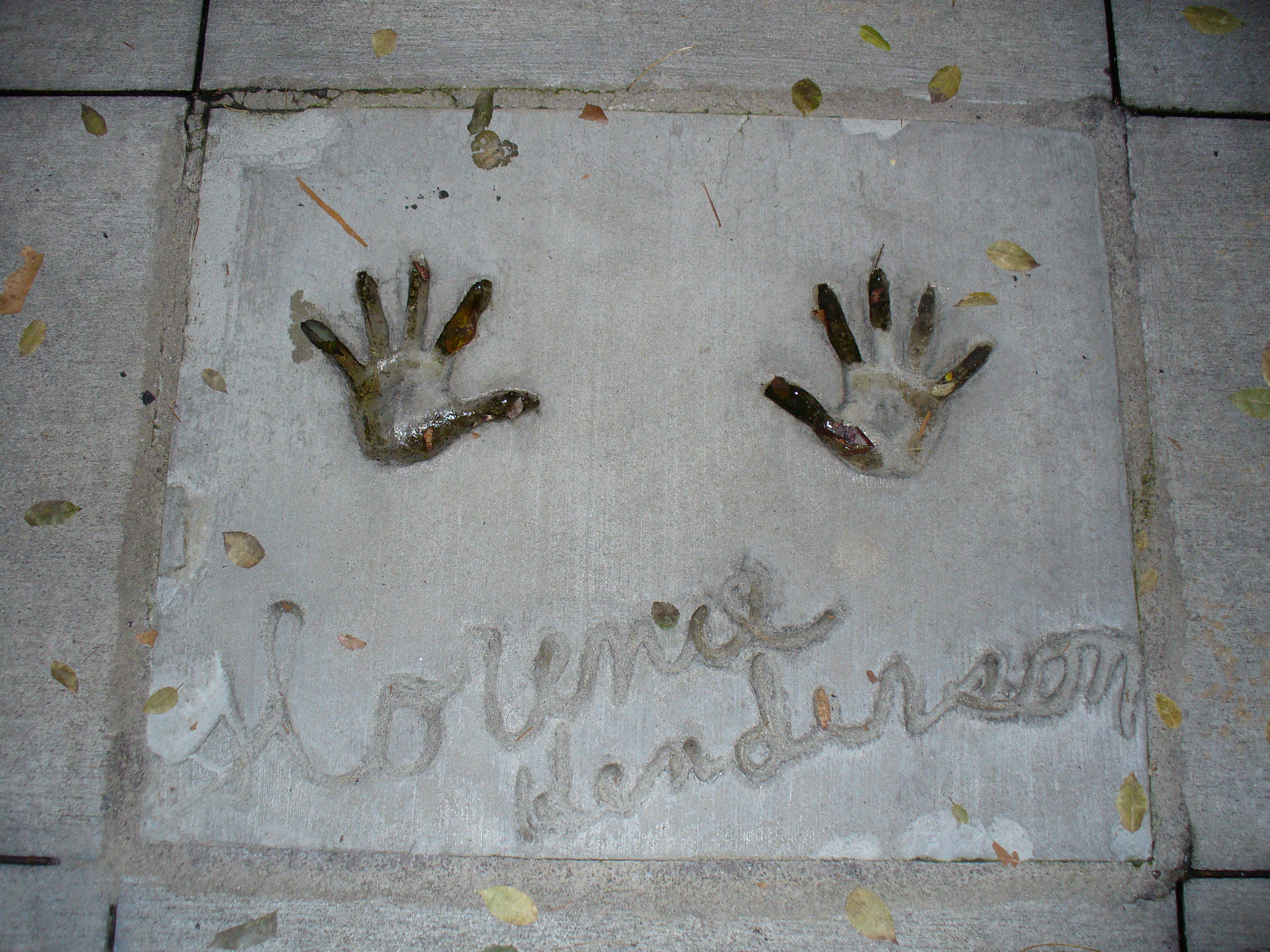
Henderson's handprints in front of Hollywood Hills Amphitheater at Walt Disney World's Disney's Hollywood Studios theme park

Henderson also appeared with her TV children, as she did with Christopher Knight on the reality television series My Fair Brady. She was also in the sixth season of VH1's The Surreal Life.

Beginning in the mid-1990s, Henderson would perform the song "God Bless America" at the Indianapolis 500, accompanied by the Purdue All-American Marching Band, at the request of the Hulman-George family, the owners of the Indianapolis Motor Speedway and friends of Henderson's.

She appeared in the "Weird Al" Yankovic video for "Amish Paradise". In 2002, she made a memorable guest appearance on improvisational comedy show Whose Line Is It Anyway?, participating in on-screen kisses with Ryan Stiles and Colin Mochrie.

From 2007 to 2009, Henderson co-hosted the daily talk show Living Live with former Designing Women star Meshach Taylor on Retirement Living TV. The show was reworked to focus on her and was renamed The Florence Henderson Show. The show was nominated for an Emmy award in 2010. On the July 12, 2010, edition of WWE Raw, Henderson appeared as the night's guest host.

Henderson was one of 12 celebrities competing on the 11th season of Dancing with the Stars, which premiered on September 20, 2010. Her professional partner was Corky Ballas, father of two-time champion Mark Ballas. On October 19, 2010, she was the fifth contestant eliminated.

Henderson voiced Barbara, Cleveland Brown's childhood nanny, in the episode "The Men In Me" of The Cleveland Show, which originally aired on March 25, 2012. The episode features a depressed and confused Cleveland singing a parody version of his show's theme before Barbara interjects and gets Cleveland to realize it does not matter who he is or who others perceive him to be as long as he accepts himself for who and what he is. At the end of the episode, Cleveland says, "Florence Henderson, everyone!"

Henderson made a special appearance on May 11, 2012, in a special Mother's Day episode on The Price Is Right with Drew Carey, displaying prizes, as well as one of the showcases.

In February 2013, she began hosting a cooking show, Who's Cooking with Florence Henderson, on Retirement Living TV. Henderson hosted several times the beauty pageants Mrs. America and Mrs. World.

One of Henderson's final public appearances was at the 10th Annual Broadway Backwards Concert presented by BroadwayCares/Equity Fights AIDS. Henderson led a group performance of "There is Nothing Like a Dame" from South Pacific, which she had starred in over sixty years prior.

=== Charity appearances ===
In the 2000s, Henderson became a public benefactor to the Sisters of St. Benedict in Ferdinand, Indiana. Some of the nuns there had been early educators of Henderson. She appeared in a number of their promotional videos and helped in fundraising efforts. She won money for the sisters on the game show Weakest Link and on a classic television-themed episode of Who Wants to Be a Millionaire in 2001, winning $32,000 in their name. When Henderson appeared on The Surreal Life, she refused to wear a nun's habit in a comedy skit.

== Personal life ==
Henderson married her first husband, Ira Bernstein, in 1956. They had four children together before divorcing in 1985. Three of the children worked in show business, with her oldest daughter Barbara Bernstein appearing in three episodes of The Brady Bunch. In 1987, she married her second husband, hypnotherapist Dr. John George Kappas, whom she had met when he treated her for depression and stage fright in the early 1980s. They remained married until his death in 2002. Henderson had five grandchildren.

== Death ==
Henderson died on November 24, 2016, at Cedars-Sinai Medical Center in Los Angeles, California, at the age of 82. She had been hospitalized the previous day. According to her manager, Kayla Pressman, Henderson died of heart failure. Three days before her death, Henderson had attended the recording of Dancing with the Stars to support her friend and former on-screen daughter Maureen McCormick, who was a contestant. Pressman stated that Henderson was not ill prior to her sudden hospitalization and that her death was a "shock". She was cremated, and her ashes interred at Westwood Village Memorial Park Cemetery in Los Angeles.

== Awards ==
At the 33rd Annual Gracie Awards Gala (2008), Henderson won an Individual Achievement Award and an Outstanding Host (Information or Entertainment) for The Florence Henderson Show.

She won another Outstanding Host (Information or Entertainment) at the 37th Annual Gracie Awards Gala (2012) for co-hosting Good Food, Good Deeds.

A 1 1/16-mile (1.7 km) turf horse race for 3-year old and older fillies and mares born and bred in Indiana held at Indiana Grand Racing & Casino since 2004 is named in her honor, the Florence Henderson Stakes, on the Tuesday after Labor Day in September.

== Work ==
=== Film ===
Year	Title	Role	Notes
1970	Song of Norway	Nina Grieg	
1992	Shakes the Clown	The Unknown Woman	
1994	Naked Gun 33 1/3: The Final Insult	Herself	Cameo appearance
1995	The Brady Bunch Movie	Grandma (Carol's mother)	Cameo appearance
1996	For Goodness Sake II	Video Store Customer	
1998	Holy Man	Herself	Cameo appearance
1999	Get Bruce	Herself	Documentary
2003	Dickie Roberts: Former Child Star	Herself	Cameo appearance
2008	For Heaven's Sake	Sarah Miller	
2010	The Christmas Bunny	Betsy Ross	
2016	Fifty Shades of Black	Mrs. Robinson	
2017	Bad Grandmas	Mimi	Released posthumously
2018	Bathtubs Over Broadway	Herself	Released posthumously

=== Television ===
Year	Title	Role	Notes	Refs
1954	General Foods 25th Anniversary Show: A Salute to Rodgers and Hammerstein	Laurey	TV special	
1956	I Spy	Nymph	Episode: "The Abbe and the Nymph"	
1957	The United States Steel Hour	Mary Jane Wilk	Episode: "The Adventures of Huckleberry Finn"	
1958	The United States Steel Hour	Gladys Pratt	Episode: "A Family Alliance"	
1958	Sing Along	Herself	Regular Cast	
1958	Little Women	Meg March	TV musical special	
1958–62	Tonight Starring Jack Paar	Herself	Regular guest	
1959–60	The Today Show	Herself	Today Girl	
1962–67	Password	Herself	Contestant	
1966	The Bell Telephone Hour	Self - singer	"The Lyrics of Alan Jay Lerner" w/Barbara Harris, Edward Villella, Patricia McBride, John Cullum and Stanley Holloway	
1968	The Dean Martin Show	Herself	Guest appearance	
1971–80	Hollywood Squares	Herself	96 episodes	
1969–74	The Brady Bunch	Carol Ann Brady	117 episodes	
1976	The Love Boat	Monica Richardson	TV movie pilot	
1976	The Muppet Show	Herself	Series 1 Episode 7: "Florence Henderson"	
1976	The Paul Lynde Halloween Special	Herself	TV special	
1976–77	The Brady Bunch Hour	Carol Ann Brady	9 episodes	
1981	The Brady Girls Get Married	Carol Ann Brady	TV reunion movie	
1981	The Love Boat	Annabelle Folker	Episode: "Country Cousin Blues"	
1981	The Brady Brides	Carol Ann Brady	5 episodes	
1982	Police Squad!	Shot woman	Episode: "Rendezvous at Big Gulch (Terror in the Neighborhood)"	
1982–86	Pyramid (all versions)	Herself	Celebrity Panelist	
1983	Alice	Sarah James	Episode: "It Had to Be Mel"	
1986	Murder, She Wrote	Maria Morgana	Episode: "Death Stalks the Big Top" (Parts 1 & 2)	
1987	It's Garry Shandling's Show	Herself	Guest appearance	
1988	A Very Brady Christmas	Carol Ann Brady	TV reunion movie	
1990	The Bradys	Carol Ann Brady	6 episodes; also sang third version of theme song	
1990	Murder, She Wrote	Patti Sue Diamond	Episode: "Ballad for a Blue Lady"	
1993	Bradymania: A Very Brady Special	Herself (host)	TV special	
1993–95	Dave's World	Maggie	Occasional; Beth's mother	
1994	Roseanne	Flo Anderson	Episode: "Suck Up or Shut Up"	
1995	Fudge	Muriel	Episode: "Fudge-a-mania"	
1995	Caroline in the City	Herself	Episode: "Caroline and the Balloon"	
1995–96	Our Generation	Herself	Co-host	
1996	Ellen	Madeline	Episode: "Joe's Kept Secret"	
1997	Nightmare Ned	Herself (voice)	Episode: "Monster Ned"	
1999–2000	Later Today	Herself	Presenter	
2000	Saturday Night Live	Herself (parody)	Guest appearance (uncredited); Episode: "Jackie Chan/Kid Rock" (May 20, 2000)	
2000	The King of Queens	Lily	Carrie Heffernan's stepmother Episode: "Dark Meet"	
2001	Who Wants to Be a Millionaire	Herself	Contestant	
2001	Legend of the Candy Cane	Thelma (voice)	TV movie	
2002	Mom's on Strike	Betty	TV movie	
2002	Whose Line Is It Anyway?	Herself	Guest appearance	
2003	Mrs. America Pageant	Herself	Host	
2003	The 26th Annual Kennedy Center Honors: A Celebration of the Performing Arts	Herself	Special appearance	
2004	The Brady Bunch 35th Anniversary Reunion Special	Herself	TV reunion special	
2006	The Surreal Life	Herself	Cast member	
2006	Loonatics Unleashed	Mallory Mastermind (voice)	3 episodes	
2007	The Ellen DeGeneres Show	Herself	Guest appearance	
2007–09	The Florence Henderson Show	Host	52 episodes	
2008	Ladies of the House	Rose Olmstead	TV movie	
2009	Samantha Who?	Loretta	Guest appearance	
2010	WWE Raw	Herself	Guest host	
2010	Dancing with the Stars	Herself	Contestant, Season 11	
2012	The Cleveland Show	Nanny Barbara (voice)	Episode: "The Men in Me"	
2012	Handy Manny	Aunt Ginny (voice)	Episode: "Handy Manny and the Seven Tools"	
2012	Happily Divorced	Elizabeth	Episode: "Meet the Parents"	
2012	30 Rock	Herself	Episode: "My Whole Life Is Thunder"	
2012	Matchmaker Santa	Peggy	Hallmark Channel TV movie	
2013	Who's Cooking with Florence Henderson	Host	12 episodes	
2014	Trophy Wife	Frances Harrison	Episode: "The Wedding - Part Two"	
2014	Rachael vs. Guy: Celebrity Cook-Off	Herself	Episode: "Boardwalk Bites"	
2016	K.C. Undercover	Irma	Episode: "Dance Like No One's Watching"	
2016	The Eleventh	Regina	2 episodes (web series short)	
2016	Chelsea	Herself	Episode: "Ellen Page & Inspiring Role Models"	
2016–2018	Sofia the First	Grand Mum (voice)	2 episodes	

=== Stage ===
Year	Title	Role	Notes
1949	Carousel	Carrie Pepperidge	
1952	Wish You Were Here	The New Girl	
1952	Oklahoma!	Laurey	
1953	The Great Waltz	Resi	
1954	Fanny	Fanny	
1961–62, 1968, 1978	The Sound of Music	Maria Rainer	
1963–64	The Girl Who Came to Supper	Mary Morgan	
1965	The King and I	Anna	
1967	South Pacific	Nellie Forbush	
1974, 1981	Annie Get Your Gun	Annie Oakley	

=== Video games ===
Year	Title	Voice
1996	You Don't Know Jack Volume 2	Herself

== Book ==
- Henderson, Florence (September 20, 2011). Life Is Not a Stage: From Broadway Baby to a Lovely Lady and Beyond. Center Street. ISBN 978-1-599-95388-5.
