= Jean-Paul Vignon =

French-American actor and singer

- Born: January 30, 1935; Dire Dawa, Ethiopian Empire
- Died: March 22, 2024 (aged 89); Beverly Hills, California, U.S.
- Occupations: Actor; vocalist
- Spouse: Brigid Bazlen (m. 1966; div. 1968)
- Partner: Suzie Summers
- Children: 2, Marguerite Vignon Gaul and Lucy Brank

Jean-Paul Vignon (January 30, 1935 – March 22, 2024) was a French-American actor and singer.

== Early life ==
Vignon was born to a French father and Italian mother in Dire Dawa, Ethiopia and was raised in Djibouti as well as Avignon, France. He briefly studied medicine in Marseille and law at Sorbonne University in Paris. However, he dropped those ventures in pursuit of music.

== Career ==
In his early 20s, he earned a prestigious cabaret job, per the recommendation of Jacques Brel, that launched his entertainment career. These in a Parisian cabaret led to starring roles in the French films Les Promesses Dangereuses and Asphalte. He also signed to the French music label Disques Vogue, opening for Édith Piaf. When a side-career in the military was not met with success, Vignon moved to the United States where he got his start at New York's Blue Angel nightclub, opening for Woody Allen. Next, he appeared on The Ed Sullivan Show eight times, duetting with Liza Minnelli during one of these occasions, from which point he became a regular on The Merv Griffin Show and The Johnny Carson Show. In 1964, he recorded Because I Love You, his U.S. debut album on Columbia Records. In 1967, he made his U.S. film debut in The Devil's Brigade, opposite William Holden and Cliff Robertson.

He also appeared in Columbo, Days of Our Lives, The Young and the Restless, The Bold and the Beautiful, The Rockford Files, The French Atlantic Affair, Crazy Like a Fox, Falcon Crest, L.A. Law, Dallas, Murder, She Wrote, and Star Trek: The Next Generation.

Later, Vignon became known for his later appearances on Gilmore Girls, voicing one of Robin Hood's Merry Men in Shrek, and his voice for a dream sequence in 500 Days of Summer. He also was in the French short Le Jeu des Soldats and tried hosting a Canadian television show called The Sensuous Man. Other pursuits included founding Côte d'Azur Productions, a lip-sync dubbing company.

Vignon also lent his vocals to recordings by disco group Saint Tropez during the late 1970s.

== Death ==
Vignon died from liver cancer at age 89 in Beverly Hills, California.

== Bibliography ==
- From Ethiopia To Utopia: A Remarkable Journey in Music and in Love (2018), Côte d'Azur Californie, ISBN 9780692064733
