= Empire Builders (radio program) =

Radio program

- Genre: Western anthology
- Country of origin: United States
- Language: English
- Home station: WJZ until September 1930
- Syndicates: NBC-Blue
- Starring: Virginia Gardner; Bob McGimsey; Don Ameche; Bernardine Flynn; Harvey Hayes
- Announcer: Ted Pearson
- Written by: Edward H. Bierstadt
- Directed by: Don Bernard
- Original release: January 14, 1929 – June 22, 1931

Empire Builders is an American old-time radio Western. It was broadcast on NBC-Blue from January 14, 1929, to June 22, 1931. The reference book Radio Rides the Range: A Reference Guide to Western Drama on the Air commented, "This may have been the first western drama on radio; it certainly was one of the most unique."

== Format ==
The 30-minute weekly episodes "managed to combine romance and music in one program, along with gritty adventure and occasional bitter violence," featuring both real people from history and fictional characters. Episodes' eras ranged from the mid-1700s to the 1930s. Because the show was sponsored by Great Northern Railway, locales of the stories were usually in an area comprising California, Idaho, Montana, Oregon, and Washington state, the states served by the Great Northern Railway.

A narrator (the Old Timer) introduced each episode, and his "chuckles and characteristic colloquialisms" were regular features of the program.

As an example of the fare heard on Empire Builders, a two-part program that began on February 18, 1929, related the adventures experienced and the obstacles overcome during the Lewis and Clark Expedition. Among the difficulties included in the program was "the incident at Great Falls, where a cloudburst swelled the river and swept their encampment from the banks like so many flies."

== Personnel ==
Virginia Gardner and Bob McGimsey starred in the original version of the program, when it originated at WJZ in New York City. When origination changed to Chicago, Don Ameche, Bernardine Flynn, and Harvey Hayes starred. The supporting cast usually included Obed "Dad" Pickard, Lucille Husting, and Bob White. Ameche and Flynn, both from the University of Wisconsin, were selected for the Chicago cast from hundreds of actors and actresses who auditioned for the program. Others who were heard on the program included Jack Daly.

Ted Pearson was the announcer, Don Bernard was the director, and Josef Koestner conducted the orchestra. Edward H. Bierstadt was a writer.

Wyllis Cooper was continuity editor.
