= Bernardine Flynn =

American radio actress and announcer (1904–1977)

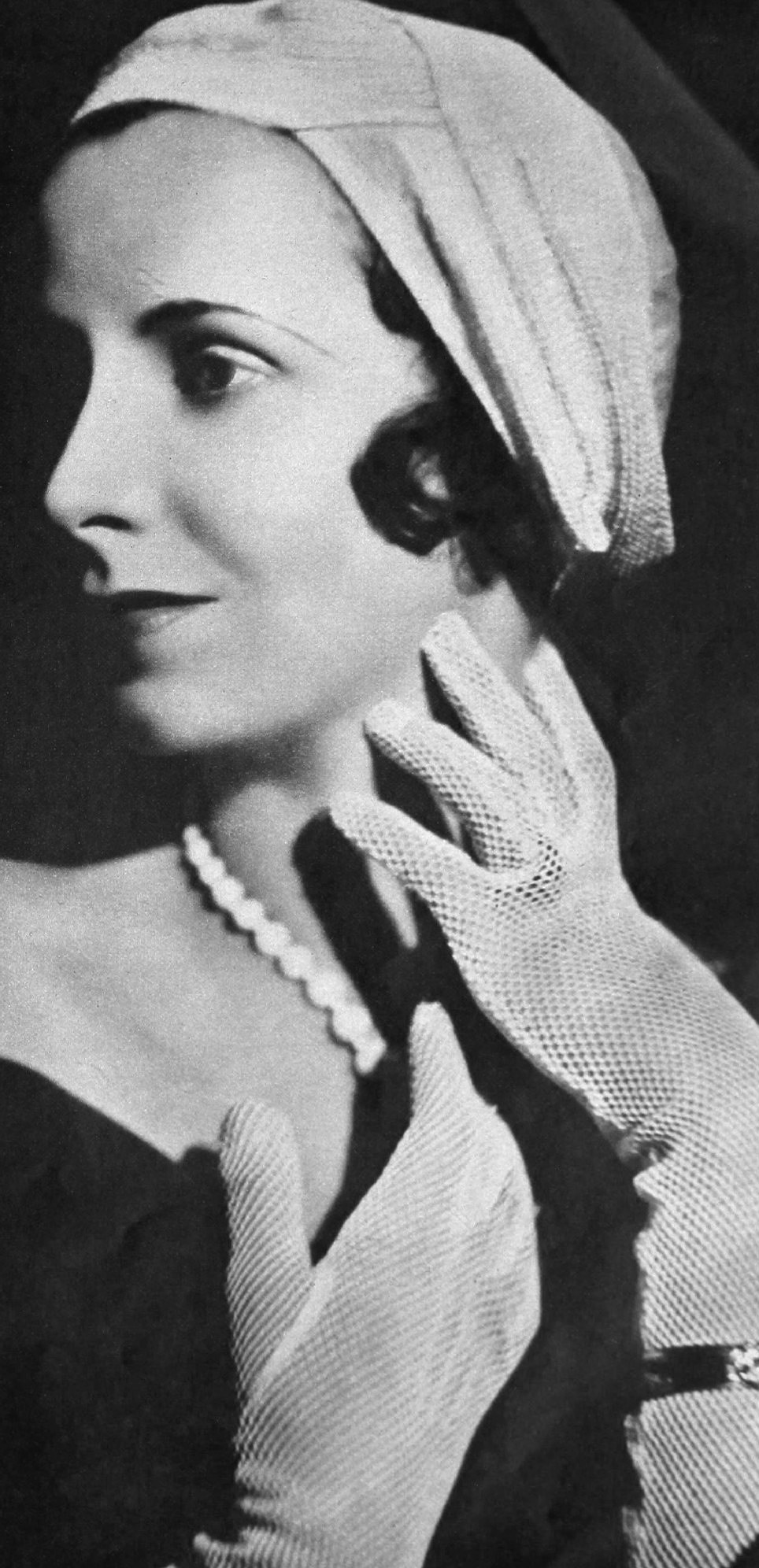
Flynn in 1931

Bernardine Flynn (January 2, 1904 – March 20, 1977) was an American radio actress and announcer best known for playing the role of Sade Gook on the long-running comic radio serial Vic and Sade.

== Early years ==
Born in 1904, Flynn graduated from the University of Wisconsin–Madison (Class of 1926), moving to Chicago in 1927. In Chicago, Flynn became a radio actress and announcer. She was used as a radio announcer, a rarity for women in the 1920s, as she was known for controlling her emotions. This quality of not becoming emotional was exploited in the Vic and Sade show, where she would play the role of straight man to the comic daffiness.

== Radio ==
One of Flynn's earliest activities on radio was on WJZ in New York City. She replaced Virginia Carter in the ingenue's role on the Empire Builders program. The following year, she was heard on Rin Tin Tin. Also in the summer of 1931, she portrayed Mrs. Jones in The Private Affairs of the Jones Family. Sponsored by Montgomery Ward, the show was one of four tested by the company to test audience response. A newspaper story about it related, "Miss Flynn [has] been heard in many dramatic productions from Chicago stories." She was heard in Malik Mystery Drama in 1932.

In 1932, Paul Rhymer chose Flynn to play Sade as the character lacked a sense of humor. Even in the most humorous of situations, Flynn's emotional self-control ensured that Sade would never break character. The 15-minute program was aired from 1932 to 1945, and in 1946, it was put back on the air as a one-hour show.

Flynn and Durward Kirby co-starred in Daytime Radio Newspaper in 1943. The 15-minute program on CBS had Kirby delivering straight news items and Flynn handling human-interest reports.

== Television ==
Flynn appeared in both of the television incarnations of Vic and Sade, the only cast member to appear in both the 1949 Colgate Theater episodes and the 1957 revival The Humor of Vic 'n' Sade. She also played Lorna Corey in the soap opera Hawkins Falls, Population 6200, which ran on NBC from 1951 to 1955.

== Stage ==
Author Zona Gale recommended Flynn to Broadway producer Brock Pemberton, and Flynn had "minor roles in several Broadway plays," She was a member of the Theatre Guild.

After Vic and Sade completed its run on the radio, she joined the touring company of "Apple of His Eye," which starred Walter Huston.

== Later years ==
Flynn retired from broadcasting in 1957 (the same year Art Van Harvey, who played Vic on Vic and Sade, died). In 1964 she moved to Clay City, Illinois, her husband's home town.

== Personal life ==
Born in Madison, Wisconsin, Flynn married the physician Chester C. Doherty in 1933. Dr. Doherty later became an associate professor at Northwestern University Medical School. The couple had had two sons, Anthony and Bill. (Another source says Flynn was "mother of five fine sons.")

During World War II, while Dr. Doherty was serving as a flight surgeon in the Army Air Corps at several bases in the US, Flynn also worked as a radio reporter for a daily news program.

== Death ==
Flynn died in a hospital at Olney, Illinois in 1977 at the age of 73.
