= Maurice Copeland =

American actor (1911–1985)

- Born: June 13, 1911; Rector, Arkansas
- Died: October 3, 1985 (aged 74); New Rochelle, New York

Maurice Copeland (June 13, 1911 – October 3, 1985) was an American actor. He had supporting roles in films such as Arthur, The Pope of Greenwich Village and Trading Places.

Copeland was a member of the Pasadena Community Players troupe. On Broadway, Copeland appeared in The Freedom of the City (1974), First Monday in October (1978), and Morning's at Seven (1980).

In June 1948 he was in the initial episode of Richard Durham's Destination Freedom radio anthology.

== Filmography ==
=== Film ===
Year	Title	Role	Notes
1976	The Next Man	Conglomerate Chairman	
1979	The Seduction of Joe Tynan	Mr. Edward Anderson	
1979	Being There	Pallbearer	
1981	Blow Out	Jack Manners	
1981	Arthur	Uncle Peter	
1982	A Stranger Is Watching	Roger Perry	
1983	Trading Places	Secretary of Agriculture	

=== Television ===
Year	Title	Role	Notes
1949	Stand By for Crime	—	Episode dated 7 May 1949
1950–1952	Hawkins Falls, Population 6200	Dr. Floyd Corey	1,074 episodes
1952	American Inventory	Herndon	Episode: "Abe Lincoln's Story"
1976, 1984	The Edge of Night	Richard Blaine / Judge B. J. Ryan	3 episodes
1977	This Is My Son	Doctor	Television film
1978	The Dain Curse	McNally	Episode #1.3
1982	Will: G. Gordon Liddy	John N. Mitchell	Television film
1982	CBS Library	Fritz	Episode: "Robbers, Rooftops and Witches"
1982	Morning's at Seven	Theodore Swanson	Television film
