= Paul Rhymer =

Vic and Sade creator Paul Rhymer

Paul Mills Rhymer (November 21, 1905-October 26, 1964) was an American scriptwriter and humorist best known as the creator of radio's long-run Vic and Sade series. With a listening audience of 7,000,000, Vic and Sade was voted the number one daytime radio series in 1942, and Rhymer is regarded by many as one of the great humorists of the 20th Century.

Born in Fulton, Illinois, in 1905, Rhymer grew up in Bloomington, Illinois, attending Illinois Wesleyan University in the mid-1920s. Following his father's death, he dropped out of college to help support his mother. After employment on the Chicago and Alton Railroad, he worked as a cabdriver and then became a reporter with The Pantagraph, the Bloomington newspaper. He lost that job when the editor learned Rhymer had been fabricating interviews with non-existent people. In 1929, Rhymer moved to Chicago and signed on with the continuity department of NBC Radio, where he wrote station breaks and introductions to the dance band remote broadcasts from the local hotel ballrooms.

He launched Vic and Sade on June 29, 1932, and between 1932 and 1946, he wrote more than 3500 episodes. He was honored on April 28, 1938, when Bloomington celebrated Paul Rhymer Day. In July, 1949, Rhymer's characters were seen on television in NBC's Colgate Theater, and they returned in 1957 for a two-month run on WNBQ in Chicago.

In 1952, Rhymer scripted the five-minute NBC-TV series, The Public Life of Cliff Norton, a spin-off of comedy sketches Norton had performed on Dave Garroway's Garroway at Large from 1949 to 1951.

Rhymer also wrote book reviews and freelance magazine articles. He died October 26, 1964.
