= Maureen Daly =

Irish American author and journalist (1921–2006)

- Born: March 15, 1921; Castlecaulfield, County Tyrone, Ireland
- Died: September 25, 2006 (aged 85); Palm Desert, California, US
- Education: Rosary College
- Occupations: Novelist; short story writer; journalist
- Spouse: William P. McGivern
- Children: 2
- Relatives: Kay Daly
- Writing career
- Pen name: Maureen McGivern
- Years active: 1937 – 1990s
- Genre: Young adult fiction
- Notable works: Seventeenth Summer "Sixteen" (short story)
- Notable awards: O. Henry Award (1938) for "Sixteen"; Freedoms Foundation Award (1952); Lewis Carroll Shelf Award (1969) for Seventeenth Summer

Maureen Daly (March 15, 1921 – September 25, 2006) was an Irish-born American writer who wrote the 1942 novel Seventeenth Summer while still in her teens. Originally marketed for adults, it described a contemporary teenage romance and drew a large teenage audience. It is regarded by some as the first young adult novel, and the market niche of young adult literature was not developed until the 1960s, more than 20 years later. At age 16, Daly also wrote the award-winning short story "Sixteen", which appeared in many anthologies.

Although Daly did not publish another novel for 44 years after Seventeenth Summer, she had a long career in journalism from the 1940s through the 1990s, working at the Chicago Tribune, Ladies' Home Journal, The Saturday Evening Post, and The Desert Sun. While at the Tribune, she wrote a popular syndicated advice column for teenagers that later was covered by her younger sister, Sheila John Daly. She also wrote nonfiction books for adults and teenagers as well as story books for children. In the 1980s and early 1990s, she wrote two more young adult novels dealing with themes of romance.

She was one of the four Daly sisters (Maggie, Kay, and Sheila John) whose successful careers in media, fashion and business were covered by national magazines during the 1940s and 1950s. She also co-wrote some books with her husband, mystery and crime author William P. McGivern.

== Early life ==
Maureen Daly was born March 15, 1921, in Castlecaulfield, Ireland to Joseph Desmond Daly, a bicycle shop owner, and his wife Margaret Kelly Daly, who according to a Life magazine profile on the family was a distant cousin of banker Andrew Mellon and a descendant of Mary, Queen of Scots. Maureen was the third daughter born to the Dalys, who already had daughters Marguerite, known as Maggie, and Kathleen, known as Kay.

At the time of Maureen Daly's birth, Ireland was part of the United Kingdom of Great Britain and Ireland. In May 1921, the partition of Ireland took place and County Tyrone became part of the newly created Northern Ireland. To escape the effects of the Irish War of Independence, Joseph Daly and the family emigrated to the United States. He moved to the U.S. in 1921, and the rest of his family had joined him by 1923 when Maureen Daly was aged two. The youngest Daly daughter, Sheila John Daly, was born in the United States. The family settled in Fond du Lac, Wisconsin, and Maureen Daly became a naturalized American citizen.

== Career ==
Daly regularly published work for over five decades, starting in the 1930s when she was still in high school. Although she is best known for the fiction she wrote as a teenager, most of her career was spent as a journalist and writer of non-fiction. In the 1960s, she wrote several books for young children.

=== "Sixteen" and Seventeenth Summer ===
Daly was encouraged to write by her high school English teacher. At age 15, Daly entered her short story titled "Fifteen" in a competition sponsored by Scholastic; the story placed third. The following year, when Daly was 16, she won first prize in the same Scholastic competition with her story "Sixteen" about a girl who meets a boy at a skating rink. "Sixteen" also received an O. Henry Award in 1938, and it was published in at least 300 anthologies and in 12 languages. Daly said in a 1986 interview that she was still receiving royalty checks for the story.

Daly began writing Seventeenth Summer, her first novel, when she was 17, but did not finish it until several years later; she completed it while attending Rosary College. She entered it in an intercollegiate novel contest sponsored by publisher Dodd, Mead and won first prize. The novel, about a 17-year-old girl's experience of first love during one summer, was published by Dodd in 1942 while Daly was still in college. It drew critical praise, including an essay by Orville Prescott in The New York Times placing Daly in a group of literary "Rising Stars" alongside Eudora Welty, Nelson Algren, Howard Fast, Mary O'Hara and others. Seventeenth Summer became a bestseller, remaining continuously in print for over six decades and selling over 1 million copies by the time of Daly's death in 2006. It received a Lewis Carroll Shelf Award in 1969.

Seventeenth Summer has been credited with beginning the modern period of young adult literature, although at the time of its publication, young adult fiction was not recognized as a category (and would not be so recognized until the 1960s), and Seventeenth Summer originally was published as a novel for adults. A survey taken in the 1940s ranked the book as the third most popular with teenage readers, behind Gone with the Wind and Jane Eyre.

=== Journalism career, marriage, and travel ===
Despite the success of Seventeenth Summer, Daly did not write another novel for 44 years, choosing to pursue a journalism career. Daly explained in later interviews that she did not know Seventeenth Summer would be so successful and she needed a secure job in order to help support her mother and sisters, her father having died in 1944. She had gained journalism experience while in college, including writing an advice column for teenagers that appeared in the Chicago Tribune and was syndicated to other newspapers. Her advice columns later were collected in a book titled Smarter and Smoother: A Handbook on How to Be That Way (1944).

After graduating from Rosary College, she joined the Tribune as a police beat reporter as well as continued her advice column. She left in 1945 to become an associate editor for Ladies' Home Journal. Daly wrote a series of articles on teenagers for Ladies' Home Journal that were gathered in the book Profile of Youth (1951). In 1952, she won a Freedoms Foundation Award for "humanity in journalism" for her article "City Girl", which profiled an African-American girl living in Chicago.

Daly met William P. McGivern, Bill, at a book signing event for Seventeenth Summer in 1942, and corresponded with him during World War II. They married in 1946 and initially lived in Philadelphia. For the first 10 years of their marriage, Daly was the primary breadwinner while McGivern, who later became a successful author and screenwriter, built his career. In 1950, the couple decided to become freelance writers, move to Europe with their young daughter, and travel around the world, and Daly resigned her editor position with Ladies' Home Journal. As a freelancer, Daly sent articles to the U.S. for publication, including interviews with Eleanor Roosevelt and Harry S. Truman. Daly (as Maureen McGivern) and her husband later co-wrote Mention My Name in Mombasa; the Unscheduled Adventures of an American Family Abroad (1958), a memoir of their travels during this time to France, Spain, Gibraltar, Iceland, Belgium, Morocco, Nigeria, and Ireland.

By the early 1960s, the McGiverns had returned to the United States, settling first in Pennsylvania and later in Toluca Lake, Los Angeles, where Bill McGivern worked as a television and film writer. Daly served as an editorial consultant for The Saturday Evening Post from 1960 to 1969. In 1961, Sixteen and Other Stories, a collection of her short stories, was published. Between 1959 and the late 1960s, she wrote a number of story books for young children. In the early 1970s, the family moved to Palm Desert, California.

=== Later novels and career ===
Daly said that, over the years, she had turned down many requests to write a new novel or a sequel to Seventeenth Summer and that her failure to write a follow-up had led some teachers and librarians to think she was dead. However, Daly was motivated to write two more novels after her husband Bill McGivern and their adult daughter Megan both died of cancer within one year of each other in the early 1980s. To cope with the losses, Daly wrote the young adult novel Acts of Love (1986), basing the protagonist Retta Caldwell on her daughter Megan and the plot on events that had happened to Megan as a teenager. She published the sequel First a Dream in 1990.

Starting in 1988 and continuing into the 1990s, Daly was a long-term columnist for The Desert Sun newspaper in Palm Springs, California, writing food and restaurant reviews.

== Personal life and death ==
Daly's sisters, as well as herself, became known for their work in journalism, fashion, and advertising. Maggie became a model, journalist, and radio and television presenter, and Kay was an advertising executive and later a vice president at Revlon. When Daly left the Chicago Tribune in 1945 to join Ladies' Home Journal, her sister Sheila John, who was then a teenager, took over Daly's syndicated advice column for teenagers and continued to write the column into the 1960s, also writing several books of advice for teenagers. Time magazine called the four sisters "the celebrated Daly sisters," and Life magazine published two articles on the sisters as a group and their respective careers. Daly said that she based the character of Seventeenth Summer's narrator and protagonist Angie Morrow on herself, and the characters of the other three Morrow sisters on her own sisters.

Daly married mystery and crime thriller writer William P. "Bill" McGivern in 1946; he died of cancer in 1982. The couple had two children, Megan McGivern Shaw (1948–1983) and Patrick McGivern (1952–2012).

Daly died at age 85 on September 25, 2006, in Palm Desert, California of non-Hodgkin lymphoma.

== Selected works ==
=== Young adult books ===
- Seventeenth Summer (1942)
- Smarter and Smoother: A Handbook on How to Be That Way (1944, non-fiction)
- Objective: Johnny (1944) (one-act play)
- What's Your P.Q. (Personality Quotient)? (1952, non-fiction)
- Twelve Around the World (1957, non-fiction)
- Spanish Roundabout (1960, non-fiction)
- Moroccan Roundabout (1961, non-fiction)
- Sixteen and Other Stories (1961, short stories)
- Acts of Love (1986)
- First a Dream (1990)

=== Children's books ===
- Patrick Visits the Farm (1959)
- Patrick Takes a Trip (1960)
- Patrick Visits the Library (1961)
- Patrick Visits the Zoo (1963)
- The Ginger Horse (1964)
- Spain: Wonderland of Contrasts (1965) (non-fiction)
- The Small War of Sergeant Donkey (1966)
- Rosie, the Dancing Elephant (1967)

=== Other works ===
- The Perfect Hostess (1950, non-fiction)
- Profile of Youth (1951, non-fiction)
- Mention My Name In Mombasa (1958, non-fiction, as Maureen McGivern, with William P. McGivern)
- The Seeing (1980, as Maureen McGivern, with William P. McGivern)

In addition, Daly has been credited with completing William P. McGivern's final novel A Matter of Honor (1984) after he died in 1982 leaving it unfinished, but her name does not appear as co-author on the published editions.

=== As editor ===
- My Favorite Stories (1948)
- My Favorite Mystery Stories (1966)
- My Favorite Suspense Stories (1968)

== Legacy ==
Part of the library at Marian University in Fond du Lac, Wisconsin was named after Daly in 1963.
