= Seventeenth Summer =

Young adult novel by Maureen Daly (1942)

- First edition
- Author: Maureen Daly
- Language: English
- Genre: Coming-of-age; Romance fiction
- Set in: Fond du Lac, Wisconsin
- Publisher: Dodd Mead, Simon & Schuster
- Publication date: 1942
- Publication place: United States
- Media type: Print
- Pages: 255
- ISBN: 0396023223
- OCLC: 175940
- LC Class: PZ7.D1713

Seventeenth Summer is a young adult novel written by Maureen Daly and published in 1942. It is considered Daly's debut novel, and is considered one of the earliest entries of young adult fiction.

== Plot summary ==
Seventeenth Summer is a book about a 17-year-old girl named Angeline "Angie" Morrow. It takes place in the early 1940s in Fond du Lac, Wisconsin. Angie gets asked out on her first date by local high school basketball star Jack Duluth. They fall in love, knowing that Angie has to leave for college in Chicago in the fall and Jack is moving with his family to Oklahoma to help his uncle with the bakery business. Jack falls in love with Angie, but Angie never says that she loves him back, so the question is, does she? Although Jack spontaneously proposes to Angie at an end-of-summer party, they both know they are too young. The novel ends with a heartfelt goodbye at the train station: Jack gives Angie his class ring and Angie goes away to school, knowing she will never forget Jack or her seventeenth summer.

== Characters ==
=== Main characters ===
- Angeline "Angie" Morrow: Main character and narrator of the novel. She dates Jack and the book shows their young love. Her family is very proper, and although she starts hanging out with a rougher crowd, she remains proper and wholesome throughout the novel. While the book tells much about Jack's feelings for Angie, she rarely records expressing her love to Jack.
- Jack Duluth: The star of the high school basketball team and Angie's boyfriend.
- Lorraine Morrow: Angie's sister, who has been away at college and is home for the summer after her sophomore year. She dates frequently in college but not as much while she is home.
- Margaret Morrow: Angie's sister. She is the most popular of all the sisters. She is connected with all the right people.
- Martin Keefe: Lorraine's summer boyfriend. He is rude, always asking her out at the last minute and finally standing her up and disappearing.
- Kitty Morrow: Angie's youngest sister, age 10.

=== Minor characters ===
- Mrs. Morrow: Angie's mother, a stay-at-home mother with a strong sense of propriety.
- Mr. Morrow: Angie's father, a traveling salesman who is not often home.
- Art: Margaret's fiance.
- Tony Becker: A boy with a reputation for being fast with girls. Angie goes out with him once.
- Jane Rady: The girl Jack used to date off and on. She knows how to act with boys, and this trait sometimes makes Angie jealous.
- Swede Vincent: Jack's friend who goes sailing with him and Angie.
- Fitz: Jack's friend who often goes on double dates with him and Angie.
- Margie: A girl in Jack's group of friends, with whom Angie becomes friends. She and Fitz are going steady.
- Dollie: A younger girl who Swede sometimes dates.

== Themes ==
The main theme is first love. The growth of the love between Jack and Angie is symbolized in the novel by the growth of plants—at the beginning of the summer everything is lush and green, but as it ends the autumn frosts are setting in. The love has a distinct beginning at the start of summer and a distinct death at the end of summer.

There is also a theme of propriety in the novel. While Jack introduces Angie to a crowd whose behavior conflicts with the way she was raised, she retains her sense of propriety and never becomes a flirt or goes wild. Lorraine does not behave properly (according to the mores of the time), and because of this is embarrassed to be with her own family (first on the Fourth of July, then when she sees Angie and Jack out on a date, and finally when she leaves for school).

The novel also explores the pressure of appearances, or adherence to social norms. Angie often worries about how a girl is supposed to act towards a boy, or how people view her when she goes out without a date. A group of boys called the "checkers" often gather in the drugstore or on the street corner to keep an eye on who is dating whom; Angie considers people to be important if the checkers pay attention to them. When she starts dating Jack, she is pleased to be seen dating and to be a part of the in crowd.

== Literary significance and criticism ==
Some critics claim that "the modern period of young adult literature is often said to have begun with Seventeenth Summer". Daly is a teen writing for teens and her work influenced other writers to write specifically with the young adult audience in mind. Dwight Burton claims that, because Daly was so near adolescence herself, "Seventeenth Summer captures better than any other novel, the spirit of adolescents."

The book was controversial for its time. Although the relationship between Jack and Angie remains chaste, the novel addresses the topic of sexuality and desire in a way that had not been done before in a work of adolescent fiction. It also portrays underage drinking and smoking, both of which were considered highly improper in the 1940s.

== See also ==
- Fifteen, 1956 novel by Beverly Cleary
- Splendor in the Grass, 1961 film starring Natalie Wood and Warren Beatty
- Forever..., 1975 novel by Judy Blume
