= Kay Daly =

Irish American advertising executive (1919–1975)

Kathleen "Kay" Daly (8 January 1919 – 16 October 1975) was an Irish-born American advertising executive and one of the four "celebrated Daly sisters". At Norman, Craig & Kümmel she was the creative force behind the famous Maidenform "I Dreamed ..." campaign and Revlon's legendary 1952 Fire And Ice campaign, working with photographer Richard Avedon. She also was responsible for the line "Every woman alive loves Chanel Number Five". She went on to join Revlon in 1961 as vice president and creative director.

Kathleen Daly was born in Castlecaufield, County Tyrone, Ulster, Ireland, in 1919. The family emigrated early in the 1920s. She grew up as one of four sisters, Maggie, Kay, Maureen, and American-born Sheila. They became known for their writing and work in journalism, fashion, and advertising, and were called "the celebrated Daly sisters" by Time magazine in 1966. Life magazine ran a feature story on them in 1949 and a follow-up in 1959. All four were at least once employed by the Chicago Tribune.

When she moved to San Francisco after World War II, Kay Daly famously rented space on a billboard to advertise for an apartment. It not only netted her an apartment, but netted her nationwide fame and countless marriage proposals. She had a brief marriage to BMW executive and film producer Richard Bradford (part of the famous Bradford family of Plymouth Colony), who fathered her sons John (Kelly), Richard, and Peter. She then was married to journalist and executive Warren Leslie, who adopted and raised her sons, until her death on 16 October 1975, of pancreatic cancer. She was survived by husband Warren, sons Kelly, Peter, and Richard Bradford, and stepsons Warren and Michael Leslie.
