= Bill Hayes (actor) =

American actor and singer (1925–2024)

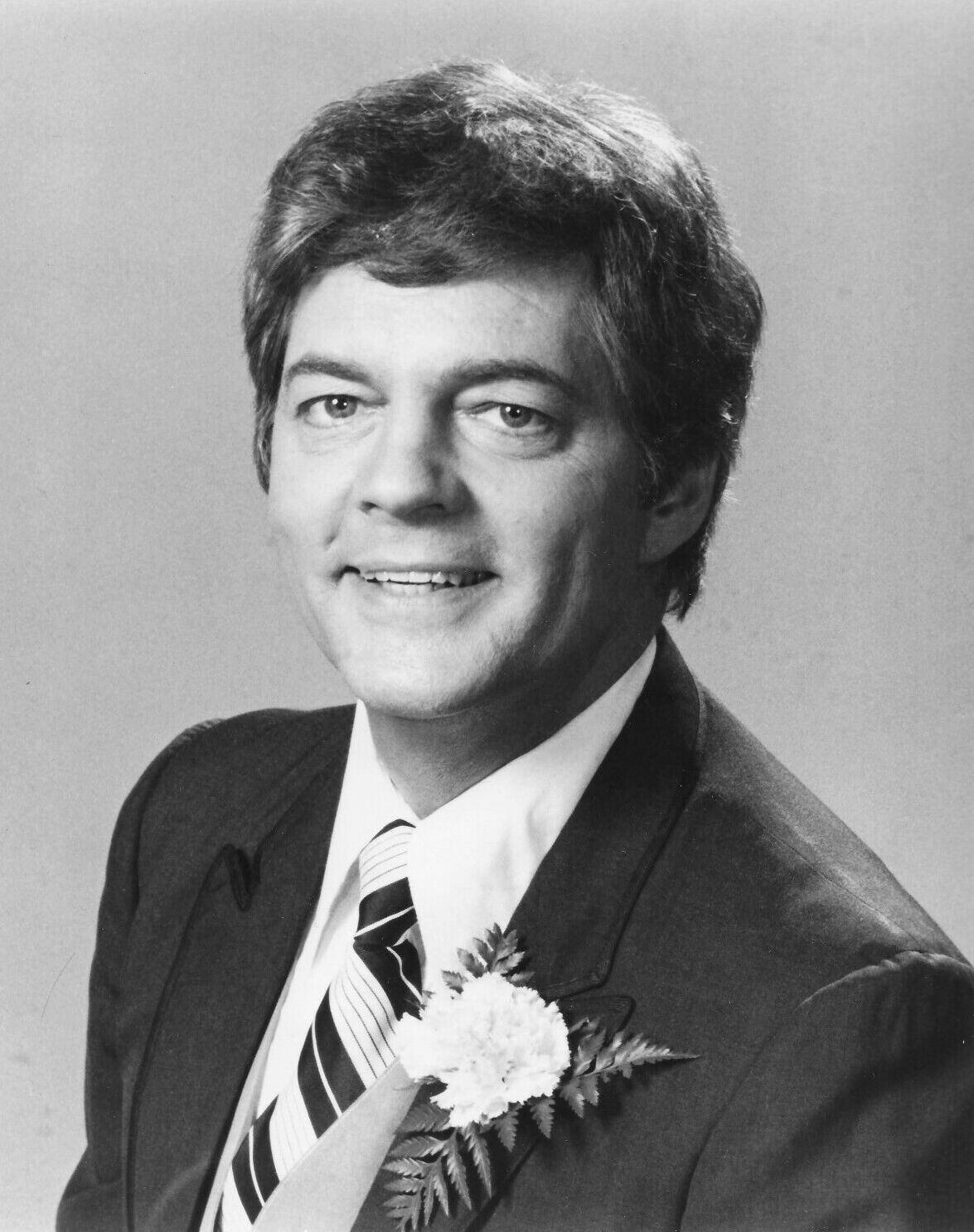
- Hayes in 1976
- Born: William Foster Hayes III; June 5, 1925; Harvey, Illinois, U.S.
- Died: January 12, 2024 (aged 98); Los Angeles, California, U.S.
- Occupations: Actor; singer
- Years active: 1948–2024
- Known for: Days of Our Lives as Doug Williams
- Spouses: Mary Hobbs (m. 1947; div. 1969) Susan Seaforth (m. 1974)
- Children: 5

William Foster Hayes III (June 5, 1925 – January 12, 2024) was an American actor and recording artist. His song "The Ballad of Davy Crockett" hit the top of the Billboard charts between March and May 1955.

Following a successful career as a musician that began in the late 1940s, Hayes began to focus on dramatic acting parts in the late 1960s, which led him to be cast in a role that gained him additional fame to a younger generation. This new chapter began in 1970 when he originated the character of Doug Williams on NBC's Days of Our Lives; the character's final appearance on the program was streamed posthumously on Peacock on July 11, 2024.

== Early life ==
Hayes was born in Harvey, Illinois, on June 5, 1925. He attended Whittier Grade School and Thornton Township High.

In March 1943, while a freshman at DePauw University, he enlisted in the U.S. Navy Air Corps, and received his welcome letter on his eighteenth birthday ordering him to report for active duty on July 1. For the next 27 months, he trained to be a fighter pilot. He was two weeks shy of receiving his commission as a 2nd Lieutenant in the Marine Air Corps, scheduled to fly an F8F off a carrier, when World War II ended. He was awarded the American Campaign Medal and the World War II Victory Medal.

Given the choice of reenlisting in the Navy or getting out immediately, he opted for civilian life. After five weeks of hitchhiking around the Midwest to celebrate with buddies who were also coming home, he returned to complete his Bachelor of Arts requirements at DePauw University, where he was a member of the Lambda Chi Alpha fraternity and graduated in June 1947 with a dual major in Music and English.

== Career ==
Hayes was a singer on the Sid Caesar and Imogene Coca variety show Your Show of Shows in the early 1950s. He had a supporting role in the 1952 black comedy Stop, You're Killing Me. During the Davy Crockett craze in 1955, three recorded versions of "The Ballad of Davy Crockett" were in the top 30. Hayes' version was the most popular: It was number 1 on the Billboard best sellers chart for five weeks, sold over two million copies, and was awarded a gold disc. He also starred on Broadway in Rodgers and Hammerstein's Me and Juliet (1953). Hayes had other small hits in the 1950s, including "The Berry Tree" and covers of "High Noon" and "Wringle, Wrangle"; the latter was his only other Hot 100 hit, reaching number 33 in 1957.

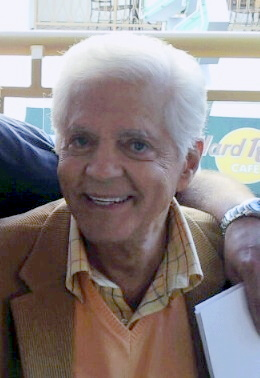
Hayes in 2010

On Days of Our Lives, Hayes was introduced as a convict who was also a lounge singer. The character of Doug returned in 1986 and 1987 as well as 1993 and 1996. Later, he was on the show from 1999 onwards. His character was killed off in the spring of 2004 by Dr. Marlena Evans. In an elaborate plot hatched by head writer James E. Reilly, Doug turned up alive on a tropical island and went home to his wife.

In 2017, World by the Tail, a documentary about Bill Hayes's life, was released online. On June 27, 2017, while present in the show's audience, Hayes was featured in an impromptu interview on a web special for The Tonight Show Starring Jimmy Fallon; in his heyday, he had been a guest on the Johnny Carson-hosted version of the show.

== Personal life and death ==
Hayes graduated from DePauw University with majors in music and English and became a member of Lambda Chi Alpha. Hayes earned a master's degree in music from Northwestern University and a Ph.D. in education from West Virginia University.

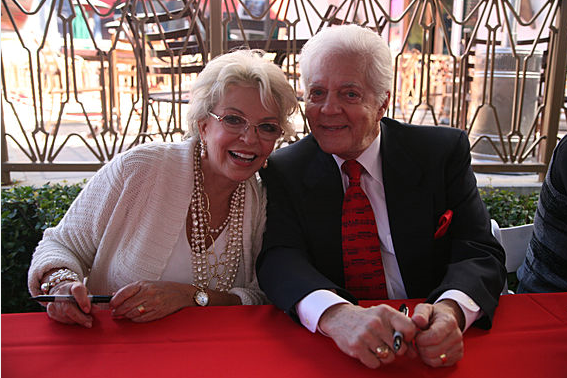
Hayes with his wife Susan in 2010

Hayes was married to Mary Hobbs from 1947 to 1969; they had five children. He was then married to his Days of our Lives co-star Susan Seaforth Hayes, beginning in 1974. Their relationship was so popular that they were featured on the cover of Time in 1976, the only soap opera stars to hold that distinction to date. In 2005, the couple published their joint autobiography, Like Sands Through the Hourglass. The couple also supported the West Texas Rehab Center.

Hayes died in Studio City, Los Angeles on January 12, 2024, at age 98.

== Filmography ==
- Days of Our Lives (Doug Williams: 1970–1984; 1986–1987; 1993; 1994; 1996; 1999–2024 (recurring)
- Miracle at Gate 213 (TV film) – Louis Darling (2013)
- Frasier (TV series) ("Frasier Has Spokane") – Sully (2002)
- Matlock (TV series) (The Reunion) – George Dutton (1988)
- Password Plus – Himself (1979)
- Cade's County (TV series) (1972)
- The Interns (TV series) (The Price of Life) – Vern Anderson (1970)
- Once Upon a Mattress (TV special) – Minstrel (1964)
- The Cardinal (film) – Frank (1964)
- True Story (TV series) – Larry Foster (1961)
- Here's Hollywood (TV variety series) – Himself-multiple appearances (1961)
- Show of the Week: "Music of the Thirties" – Himself (1961)
- Music for a Christmas Night – The Gift of Song (TV music special) – Himself (1960)
- The Bell Telephone Hour (TV variety series) – Himself (1960)
- The Voice of Firestone (TV variety series) – Himself (1959)
- Oldsmobile Music Theatre (TV drama series) – Host (1959)
- Kiss Me Kate (TV special) – Bill Calhoun/Lucentio (1958)
- Little Women (TV musical special) – John Brooke (1958)
- Yeoman of the Guard (Hallmark Hall of Fame TV special) – Colonel Fairfax (1957)
- The Big Record (TV variety series) – Himself; multiple appearances (1957)
- Club 60 (TV variety series) – Himself (1957)
- Max Liebman Presents (TV variety series) – Himself (1956)
- The Ernie Kovacs Show (TV variety series) – Himself (1956)
- Rocket Revue (TV variety series) – Himself (1956)
- Variety (TV special) (1955)
- The Percy Faith Hour (TV variety series) (1955)
- The Woolworth Hour (TV variety series) (1955)
- General Foods 25th Anniversary Show: A Salute to Rodgers and Hammerstein (1954)
- Ed Sullivan's Toast of the Town (TV variety series) (1953)
- Stop, You're Killing Me (film) – Chance Whitelaw (1952)

== Awards and nominations ==
- Daytime Emmy Award: Outstanding Actor, Daytime Drama Series (nomination) (1975 and 1976)
- Soapy Awards: Actor of the Year (1977)
- Daytime TV Magazine Reader's Poll: Best Actor (1973, 1976, 1977, and 1978)
- Afternoon TV Magazine: Best Actor (1974)
- Photoplay Magazine Gold Medal Award: Favorite Daytime Male Star (1977 and 1978)

In 2016, the Bill Hayes Prize in Musical Theater was created by the National Association of Teachers of Singing.

On April 29, 2018, the National Academy of Television Arts and Sciences presented Bill Hayes and Susan Seaforth Hayes with Lifetime Achievement Awards at the 45th Annual Daytime Emmy Awards.

== See also ==
- Doug Williams and Julie Olson
- Supercouple
