= One More Minute =

Single by Saint Tropez
- B-side: "Belle De Jour"
- Released: 1979
- Length: 3:50
- Label: Butterfly
- Composers: Dave Jordan; Barry Blue
- Producers: W. Michael Lewis; Laurin Rinder

"One More Minute" was a hit single for Saint Tropez in 1979. It registered in multiple charts.

== Background ==
"One More Minute" was written by Dave Jordan and Barry Blue. Backed with "Belle De Jour", it was released on Butterfly 41080.

== Reception ==
The single was one of the new singles noted by RMR Weekly for the week of 16 April 1979. It was already gaining momentum at disco, clubs and on radio. Referring to it as Super hot disco/rock, the writer said that it was one for consideration.

"One More Minute" was one of the Single Picks in the 21 April issue of Record World. The reviewer said that the Dave Jordan and Barry Blue composition kicked off Saint Tropez' new album with great style, and with the female vocals being the focal point, the disc was ready for radio and disco action.

== Charts ==
=== RMR Weekly ===
For the week of 16 April, "One More Minute" / "Fill My Life" peaked at no. 7 on the RMR Weekly Disco Clubs chart.

=== Billboard ===
The record peaked in the Billboard Hot 100 for the week of 9 June 1979 during its eleven-week run. It also peaked at no. 90 in the Billboard Soul Singles chart for the week of 12 May during a four-week run.

=== Cash Box ===
It spent seven weeks in the Cash Box chart, peaking at no. 70 for the week of 26 May 1979.
