= Vic and Sade =

American radio program

- Vic and Sade rehearsal; from left: Art Van Harvey, Bernardine Flynn, Paul Rhymer and Bill Idelson
- Genre: Situation comedy: Daily (1932), Weekly (1946)
- Running time: 15 minutes (1932–44, 1945); 30 minutes (1946)
- Country of origin: United States
- Language: English
- Home station: NBC, CBS, Blue, Mutual
- TV adaptations: 1949 (NBC, as part of Colgate Theatre), 1957 (WNBQ, Chicago)
- Starring: Art Van Harvey; Bernardine Flynn; Bill Idelson; Clarence Hartzell
- Created by: Paul Rhymer
- Written by: Paul Rhymer
- Recording studio: Chicago
- Original release: June 29, 1932 – October 26, 1946
- Audio format: Mono
- Opening theme: Chanson Bohémienne
- Sponsored by: Procter & Gamble (15-minute shows); Fitch Shampoo (30-minute shows)

Vic and Sade is an American radio program created and written by Paul Rhymer. It was regularly broadcast on radio from 1932 to 1944, then intermittently until 1946, and was briefly adapted to television in 1949 and again in 1957.

During its 14-year run on radio, Vic and Sade became one of the most popular series of its kind, earning critical and popular success: according to Time, Vic and Sade had 7,000,000 devoted listeners in 1943. For the majority of its span on the air, Vic and Sade was heard in 15-minute episodes without a continuing storyline. The central characters, known as "radio's home folks", were accountant Victor Rodney Gook, his wife Sade (Bernardine Flynn) and their adopted son Rush (Bill Idelson). The three lived in "the little house halfway up in the next block."

== Broadcast history ==
Dates	Format
June 29, 1932, to September 29, 1944	15 minutes daily
August 21, 1945, to December 7, 1945	15 minutes daily
June 27, 1946, to October 26, 1946	30 minutes weekly
July 11 to July 25, 1949	three half-hour television episodes replacing Colgate Theatre, Monday nights.
c. spring 1957	seven 15-minute television episodes for WNBQ, Thursday nights.

Vic and Sade was first heard over NBC's Blue network in 1932 and originated in Chicago. At the height of its popularity, it was broadcast over all three major networks and as often as six times a day.

== Overview ==
Vic and Sade was written by the prodigious Paul Rhymer for the entire length of its long run. The NBC radio series premiered on June 29, 1932, on its 15 affiliated stations. The principal characters were a married couple living in "the small house halfway up in the next block". On July 8, 1932, Vic and Sade discussed the plight of nine-year-old Rush Meadows, who was the son of one of Sade's school friends. On July 15 Rush arrived, and soon listeners forgot that the boy had been adopted by the Gooks. Juvenile actor Bill Idelson was 12 years old when the show began.

It was in this format, with only three characters, that the program thrived for the next eight years and won many awards for the writer, actors and sponsor.

In 1940, the actor who played Vic, Art Van Harvey, became ill, and Sade's Uncle Fletcher (Clarence Hartzell) was added to the cast to fill the place of the missing male lead. When Van Harvey recovered his health, Uncle Fletcher was kept on as a fourth character. During World War II, the actor who played Rush, Bill Idelson, was called into military service, and he left the show. The spring months of 1943 were a tumultuous period, but eventually a second son figure, Russell Miller (David Whitehouse), was brought in, and the program continued as it always had. Idelson later returned as Rush.

Paul Rhymer frequently gave each of the principals a day off, by confining his scripts to only two of the main characters. Vic and Sade would discuss a domestic problem while Rush was in school; Sade and Rush would review the day's events while Vic was still at the office; Vic and Rush would tackle some project while Sade was out shopping. Several episodes deliberately make no forward progress whatever, as the cast introduces the episode's premise but gets bogged down in endless details.

In the mid-1940s, Rhymer evidently felt some pressure from the sponsor's advertising agencies to include more romance and human interaction in his scripts, like the other daytime dramas on the air. He complied -- on his terms -- by adding ridiculous touches (his romantic lead, Dwight Twentysixler, always speaks with his "mouth full of shingle nails"!) and oddball characters (Orville Wheeney, the slow-witted gas-meter man; Jimmy Custard, the crochety town official who never quite makes clear what he does as the City Calistalker with the statistics he collects; Mr. Sprawl, the frail old man who wears a baby's bonnet and dotes on "peanuts with chocolate smeared on the outsides").

Vic and Sade left the air on September 29, 1944, with the final episode striking a melancholy note: Vic, Sade, Rush, and Uncle Fletcher, discussing their plans, are all going in different directions. Each actor takes the microphone at the very end, and says "Goodbye" in turn.

This was not the final curtain for Vic and Sade, however; the show was revived three times over the next two years. In 1945, the cast was augmented to include many characters who were previously only talked about. In 1946 it was a summer replacement series, now in a half-hour format and played in front of a studio audience. Later that year it became a sustaining (unsponsored) feature on the Mutual network, still in half-hour form but without an audience; this was the final incarnation of the 14-year-old radio series.

== Attempts at television adaptations ==
In 1949 three television episodes were made (with only Flynn remaining from the original cast), using an elaborate set that included the whole house as well as the front and back yards; the three episodes replaced the Colgate Theatre anthology series, with the same company as sponsor. In 1957 a series entitled The Humor of Vic 'n' Sade ran for seven weeks, returning to the original three-character format with 15-minute episodes, a multi-camera setup and a small, stripped-down, bare set. Both Flynn and Van Harvey reprised their roles, with teen actor Eddie Gillian as Rush; the revival was cut short when Van Harvey died in July 1957.

== Characters ==
All of the action of Vic and Sade, all of the people and all of the places in the town were created strictly through the dialogue. Listeners heard just the voices of the three, later four, principal speaking characters, embellished with very few sound effects. This intimate effect was lessened as the series progressed and more and more voices were added.

=== Speaking characters ===
==== Vic ====
Victor Rodney Gook was the chief accountant of the Consolidated Kitchenware Company Plant Number Fourteen. He was the Exalted Big Dipper of the Drowsy Venus Chapter of the Sacred Stars of the Milky Way, a fraternal order founded by R.J. Konk. Vic's passion was parades, alarm clocks, cigars, wide-brimmed hats and doorbells. He was often asked to submit articles to the Kitchenware Dealers Quarterly and the lodge magazine. Rush's/Russell's nickname for Vic was "Gov." Vic's good deed was always looking out to help Hank Gutstop get a job, allowing Hank to pay Vic back (Sade thought little of Hank, a constant source of friction with Vic). Vic's opening line upon entering the house through the kitchen screen door was usually, "Hi-dee-hi, Ho-dee-ho," a borrowing from Cab Calloway's version of "Minnie the Moocher."

==== Sade ====
Sade, the straightwoman of the cast, was a housewife who took pride in her housekeeping. Her interest outside the home was primarily focused on the Thimble Club sewing circle where she and the thimble ladies would get together to sew and gossip. She was very pragmatic about things and had little sense of humor. Her world extended to a very small radius and she cared little for anything outside her tightly drawn circle. Vic addressed his wife as Sade or Sadie, or as "Uncle Harry" or "Corporal Johnson," but his usual nicknames for her were "Kiddo" and "Dr. Sleech". Rush/Russell just called her Mom or Ma. Her unfulfilled goal was to go shopping with Ruthie and have each come out even in their money when they got home; it never balanced as she felt Vic and Rush would make fun of her money struggles.

==== Rush ====
Paul Rhymer had intended to introduce Rush by having Sade give birth to an eight-year-old boy, but the sponsor objected. On July 8, 1932 Vic and Sade discussed the plight of nine-year-old Rush Meadows, who was the son of one of Sade's school friends. On July 15th Rush arrived, and soon listeners forgot that the boy had been adopted by the Gooks. Rush's favorite activities were playing baseball (and football) in Tatman's vacant lot, watching the fat men play handball down at the YMCA, taking in the moving picture show at the Bijou Theatre (pronounced, "By-Joe"), and reading "vigorous fiction" about the adventures of Third Lieutenant Clinton Stanley. Rush was always looking for ways to make a quick buck and had an angle on everything; doing homework, and especially algebra, was not high on his priority list. Sade's usual nickname for Rush was "Willie" (perhaps based upon Bill Idelson's actual name) and Vic might make a nickname out of another boy's name (e.g. "Roscoe"), a girl's name (e.g. "Margaret", or "Marjorie"), or a compound noun (e.g. "Brain-Fog" or "Stove-Poker").

==== Russell ====
While Bill Idelson was in the armed forces, his "Rush" character was put on hold by Paul Rhymer for the duration. In Rush's stead came young Russell Miller, who served the same function in the Gook household. Some scripts featuring Rush were recycled to feature Russell, such as "Working on Hank Gutstop's Debts", "Sleepers Beware", and "Mr. Chinbunny Wants to Smoke Cigars". However, "Rush Tenders His Resignations" involved Rush's plan to alert his school's faculty that he was resigning from social clubs to focus on academics, so the teachers would reward his new resolve with better grades; "Russell Tenders His Resignations" is less in character. Russell enjoyed school and did well (but sometimes spoke with imperfect grammar) despite the fact he was more the dreamer, the naive young romantic; he was always willing to lend a hand no matter how impractical his outlook was. Russell was also addressed by family nicknames, including "White House" (based on the actual surname of actor David Whitehouse, and used in "Christmas Suggestions for the Boss" on Nov. 26, 1943). When Bill Idelson returned from the service, Rush also returned to the family group.

==== Uncle Fletcher ====
Uncle Fletcher was a long-winded talker who had an outrageous story and advice about everything. If there was one activity, outside of telling stories, that he can be noted for, it would be riding on Gumpox's garbage wagon, and he even got a special pass to allow him to do so. He would sometimes fall into the garbage. He especially enjoyed discussing the interesting facts and statistics about such things as his watch fob collection, key collection, photos and snapshots, and his landlady's washrag collection. And he liked popping popcorn. He was always bringing up names of people he assumed Sade knew, whom she never did. Uncle Fletcher liked to bring up the fellow who walked to his own funeral: "He made his plans, walked to the mortuary. There he later died." Uncle Fletcher would often address the family as "Vic/Sadie/Rush/Russell Honey," but once he denied Sade her "Honey" appellation because she had expressed impatience when he tried to relay some not-so-important news. He frequently told anecdotes about characters with names such as Rishigan Fishigan of Sishigan Michigan.

=== Non-speaking characters ===
The following characters were not portrayed by actors until very late in the show's run (and rarely even after that) but were frequently discussed by Vic, Sade, Rush, and Uncle Fletcher.

Bess, Walter, and "Yooncie"
Sade's sister and her husband. Walter ran a barber shop in Carberry, Illinois (possibly a mispronunciation of Cabery, Illinois), and Bess would send letters and postcards that always began "Dear sister and all, Thought I would write and see how you are feeling." Bess and Walter's daughter "Yooncie" (apparently a misreading of "Eunice," although Rush referred to his classmate Eunice Raypool correctly) was learning to play the piano; the pieces invariably found her stomping on the loud pedal with both feet and dragging her fingernail down the white or black keys. Walter always had twinges in his kneecap.

Fred and Ruthie Stembottom
... enjoyed playing 500 (card game) with Vic and Sade. Ruthie would go with Sade to the washrag sales at Yamelton's Department Store, where she always ended up in the underwear department. Fred often tried to extort hard manual labor out of Vic (pour concrete floors, tear down partitions, change tires on the car) on the pretext of inviting him over to play cards, and serving Vic "buckets" of warm lemonade. They also serve as a means of transportation for Vic and Sade (who do not own a car), though before leaving, Fred must, inevitably, air up at least one tire. Uncle Fletcher developed the habit of calling Fred "Ted" (for no logical reason), others are influenced by this (including, it seems, Fred himself), and the name eventually sticks and Fred goes by Ted as the series progresses.

Sade's other friends
include, among others: Mis' Brighton, Mis' Trogel, and Mis' Appelrot (with whom she is sometimes at odds).

Vic's work associates
Mr. Ruebush (his boss), Miss Hammersweet (his secretary), Gus Fuss (from Plant Number 17 in Dubuque, Iowa), Mr. Buller (in Chicago) and Lolita DiRienzi (in the boxing department – Sade was quite jealous!).

Vic's lodge acquaintances
His fellow members of the all-star marching team: Y.Y. Flirch (voted best-looking man on east side of Lester, Nebraska), J.J.J.J. Stunbolt, Harry Fie, I. Edson Box, Homer U. McDancy, H.K. Fleeber (also a Consolidated Kitchenware employee, of Grovelman, South Carolina), O.X. Bellyman of Detroit, and honorary member Pom-Pom Cordova.

Two lodge members were twin brothers Robert and Slobert Hink, who kept in touch with Vic and Sade by telephone and telegram. Robert and Slobert would share these phone calls with their own relations Bertie and Dirty, Cupid and Stupid, and Bessie and Messie. A typographical error led the entire Hink family to think that Vic and Sade had a daughter, Ruth (instead of a son, Rush) and would always ask after Ruth. Rush, finding it easier to agree than explain, would answer the phone as Ruth and describe his girlish figure.

Rush's friends
Smelly Clark, Blue-tooth Johnson (whom Rush usually met "out by the garbage box"), Rooster and Rotten Davis, Leland Richards, Vernon Peggles, Milton Welch, LeRoy Snow, Heinie Call, Willis Roreback, and Russell Duncan (not to be confused with Russell Miller). Nizer Scott was his deadly enemy. Mildred Tisdel, Eunice Raypole, and Anabel Hemstreet were the girls in the neighborhood.

Russell's friends
Russell had most of the same friends as Rush with the addition of Oyster Crecker. His enemy was Heinie Call, although their relationship never reached the same feverish pitch as Rush and Nizer.

Neighbors
Mis' Harris, Mr. and Mis' Donahue (pronounced "Donahoo" by Sade and Rush/Russell), Charlie Razorscum, and Ike Kneesuffer (who played indoor horseshoes in his basement; also worked with Vic, always discussing the boxing department at Plant 17 in Dubuque, Iowa on the phone). There was also Mis' Call, Mis' Fisher, and Grandpa Snyder.

Townsfolk
Hank Gutstop (also in the Lodge as "Exalted Little Dipper," a peach of a fellow, known for sleeping 10 hours outside on the Illinois Central depot platform, fond of cigars), Stacey Yop, Alf Musherton, Pelter Unbleat, and B.B. Baugh. Mr. Gumpox was the garbage man. The Brick-Mush man once got his head caught in a revolving door (at Yamelton's). Rishigan Fishigan from Sishigan, Michigan was introduced to the show as part of Mr. Buller's Christmas shopping list, but soon became a regular friend of Vic's (who would address him as "Fish" when they talked on the telephone); he was also the gentleman friend of Rush's Sunday School teacher Miss Neagel.

== Setting ==
The town in which Vic and Sade live is named only once, in passing through a humorous credit in one episode ("Sade's gowns by Yamelton's Department Store – Crooper, Illinois"), over the course of the entire series, as far as it is known from existing scripts and recordings. In the June 20, 1940, episode, Rush says of his school's principal, "Mr. Chinbunny is attending a meeting of Illinois high school principals." Therefore, their town must be in Illinois. The town is based on a vaguely fictionalized version of Bloomington, Illinois, where Rhymer grew up. In fact, Bloomington is the county seat of McLean County, where Plant Number Fourteen is located.

== Constant themes ==
- Vic trying to buy "wide-brimmed hat" or "cowboy hat"; Sade says it makes him look like a "peeled onion"
- Rush trying to borrow 10 cents from Vic
- Rush trying to finish a story about Smelly Clark's uncle's escorting his lady-friend to Peoria for purposes of enjoying a fish dinner
- Vic defending Hank Gutstop to Sade
- Sade comparing receipts coming out to an even dollar amount with Ruthie's totals on shopping trips
- Sade put upon having to buy Christmas cards in July
- Vic handling Christmas gift list annually for boss
- Vic doing a spot of office work at the kitchen table
- Sade darning socks
- Sade bemoaning "those fellows from Chicago lodge headquarters" always coming up with new ways to get money out of Vic
- Sade being distressed by human-interest stories in the newspaper, always depicting her as a grandmotherly old woman
- Vic wanting to fix the alarm clocks – "they always need oiling and regulating" – with his little hammer, always breaking them
- Sade being jealous of Vic's officemate, the flirtatious Lolita DiRienzi
- Fred asking Sade what flavor ice cream to buy for the card party; Sade asking Vic (and, at least once, Rush); Sade disregarding Vic's suggestion and telling Fred that Vic is enthusiastic about chocolate (or, if the drugstore is out of that, strawberry) since chocolate (or strawberry) is Fred's favorite flavor

== Venues frequently referenced ==
=== In town ===
- The Bright Kentucky Hotel (which was shabby)
- The Butler House Hotel (which was expensive: Hank Gutstop was fired as house detective for arresting guests)
- The Ten Cent Store
- The Greek's Confectionery
- Croucher's Grocery Store (where Rush can buy bananas "if they're ripe")
- Yamelton's Department Store (the shop with washrag sales)
- The Little Tiny Petite Pheasant Feather Tea Shoppy (which had only three tables; Hank was fired as hostess for excessive eating)
- The Royal Throne Twenty-five-cent Barbershop (Hank quit on the first day of job as business developer)
- The People's Bank Building
- The Unity Building (where lodge meetings were held)
- The Bijou Moving Picture Theater usually presenting films starring Gloria Golden and Four-Fisted Frank Fuddleman (a parody of two-fisted action star Jack Holt)
- Tatman's vacant lot (where Rush/Russell played baseball; at one time it was called Seymour's vacant lot)
- Kleeberger's Haberdashery (where Vic perpetually owed $2)
- Miller Park (which featured a zoo and a lake)
- The Interurban Train Station
- The Illinois Central Depot – where Hank frequently sleeps on the platform
- The courthouse – where Hank frequently sleeps in the courtyard
- The Lazy Hours Pool Parlor – where Hank plays bottle pool

=== Communities often mentioned ===
- Sweet Esther, Wisconsin (town of the daily parade)
- Dismal Seepage, Ohio
- Yellow Jump, North Dakota
- Grovelman, South Carolina (described as the geographical center of the United States by H.K. Fleeber)
- East Brain, Oregon (home of Homer U. McDancy)
- Sick River Junction, Missouri (home of the Missouri State Home for the Tall)
- Fiendish, Indiana

Several actual Illinois communities near Bloomington were also frequently referenced on air:

- Stanford
- Minier
- Hopedale
- Delavan
- Hudson
- Kappa
- El Paso – not to mention these communities along Route 66 between Chicago and Bloomington:
- Towanda
- Lexington
- Chenoa
- Pontiac
- Dwight

== Influence ==
Once voted the best radio serial in a poll of 600 radio editors, Vic and Sade also received praise from many well-known listeners, including Ray Bradbury, Norman Corwin, Stan Freberg, Edgar A. Guest, Ogden Nash, John O'Hara, Fred Rogers, Franklin Delano Roosevelt, Jean Shepherd, James Thurber, Tom Lehrer and Hendrik Willem van Loon. Nash and O'Hara both compared Rhymer to Mark Twain, while others made a comparison with Charles Dickens, but Rhymer defies comparison since his work is basically a sui generis. The series had an influence on the writing of Kurt Vonnegut, who called it "the Muzak of my life."

Bernardine Flynn said the show once received a letter from a judge who called a recess each afternoon so he could listen to Vic and Sade.

== Extant episodes ==
Despite such high praise, 2000 disc recordings of the show were destroyed just before 1940 and some 1200 have been lost since that time, including all episodes made before 1937. Today only about 330 original recordings have survived. (See #Audio downloads.) It is estimated that Rhymer wrote more than 3500 scripts for the show. Some of his scripts were collected in books (See #Bibliography).

== Resources ==
=== Wisconsin Historical Society ===
Paul Rhymer's papers, including many Vic and Sade scripts and recordings, are held at the Wisconsin Historical Society.

== Cast and credits ==
=== Principal cast ===
Character	Actor
Vic Gook	Art Van Harvey (1932–46, 1957); Frank Dane (1949 TV)
Sade Gook	Bernardine Flynn
Rush Gook	Bill Idelson (1932–42, 1945–46); Dick Conan (1949 TV); Eddie Gillilan (1957 TV)
Uncle Fletcher	Clarence Hartzell (1940–46)
Russell Miller	David Whitehouse (1943–44)

=== Other personnel ===
Announcers included Bob Brown (from 1932 to 1940), Ed Herlihy, Ed Roberts, Ralph Edwards, Mel Allen, the legendary New York Yankee broadcaster (went by Melvin), and Jack Fuller.

In addition to Rhymer himself, directors included Clarence Menser, Earl Ebi, Roy Winsor, Charles Rinehardt, Homer Heck, and Caldwell Cline.

The organist for the 15-minute version was Lou Webb.
