= Martin Huston =

American television and theatre actor

Martin William Huston
- Born: February 8, 1941; Lexington, Kentucky, U.S.
- Died: August 8, 2001 (aged 60); Manhattan, New York, U.S.
- Education: Columbia University
- Occupations: Television and theatre actor
- Years active: 1951–1971
- Children: 3

Martin William Huston (February 8, 1941 – August 8, 2001) was an American television and theatre actor.

== Life and career ==
Huston was born in Lexington, Kentucky. He and his family moved to New York, where Huston attended Columbia University. He began his career in 1951, appearing in the anthology television series Lux Video Theatre. In 1953, Huston starred in the title role of the radio and television sitcom My Son Jeep.

From 1955 to 1956, Huston starred as Skipper in the television series Jungle Jim. He also starred in two more television shows, Too Young to Go Steady and Diagnosis: Unknown. Huston made his theatrical debut in 1959 in the Broadway play, titled, Only in America. Other theatre credits include Come Blow Your Horn, Take Her, She's Mine and A Race of Hairy Men!. His last theatre credit was in the title role of the 1970 Broadway play Norman, Is That You?.

== Death ==
Huston died on August 8, 2001, of cancer in Manhattan, New York, at the age of 60.
