= The American Album of Familiar Music =

American radio program

The American Album of Familiar Music is a radio program of popular music broadcast from October 11, 1931, to June 17, 1951, first on NBC, then on ABC. Directed by James Haupt, the show was produced by Frank and Anne Hummert, better remembered today for creating Ma Perkins and numerous other soap operas. On a typical broadcast a listener was likely to hear "an aria from opera, a Strauss waltz and the latest popular hit."

Sponsored by Bayer Aspirin, the show highlighted performances by a variety of vocalists, instrumentalists, and vocal groups. When it began on October 11, 1931 on NBC, the lead vocalists were Frank Munn and Virginia Rea, two of early radio's top stars because of their previous appearances as "Paul Oliver" and "Olive Palmer" on The Palmolive Hour (1927–31). Ring Lardner observed, "under any name, they sound as sweet." Lardner outlined his "perfect radio program" for The New Yorker magazine, and found a place for The Revelers along with Paul Whiteman and Fanny Brice.

In the late 1930s, Munn was joined on the program by soprano Jean Dickenson (1937–51), "Nightingale of the Airwaves." Another co-star with Munn during that period was Lucy Monroe, who sang The Star-Spangled Banner at every New York Yankees opening day and every Yankees World Series between 1945 and 1960.

Other singers featured on the program were Margaret Daum, Elizabeth Lennox, Vivian Della Chiesa, Donald Dame, and the dozen members of the Buckingham Choir. Vocalist Evelyn MacGregor (1899-1967) was also heard on The American Melody Hour.

Walter Gustave "Gus" Haenschen, who led the orchestra, composed the opening theme song, "Dream Serenade," with lyrics by Alfred Bryan. The line-up also included violin soloist Bertram Hirsch, the piano duo of Victor Arden and Phil Ohman, and a quartet billed as “The Henchmen,” after Haenschen. The show's announcers were George Ansbro, André Baruch, Howard Claney and Roger Krupp. The 30-minute show aired Sunday evenings at 9:00 p.m. until 1933 when it moved to 9:30 p.m.

In 1938, the Hummerts did away with the studio audience after concluding that the music sounded better with fewer people in the studio, and fewer breaks due to applause. Musical Director and Conductor Gus Haenschen, who wrote many of the program's arrangements, ensured that the orchestra played softly as the announcer introduced each selection, thereby achieving a musical continuity from the opening to the close of each broadcast.

In 1945, when Munn left the show for retirement, he was replaced by Frank Parker. In 1952, Parker was replaced by tenor Earl William, the stage name of Earl Sauvain. Baritone Michael Roberts and pianist Ernest Ulmer were also added to the cast in 1952.

After the NBC run ended on November 19, 1950, the series moved a week later (November 26) to ABC where it was still broadcast Sundays at 9:30 p.m., continuing until the June 17, 1951 final network broadcast. From then until June 20, 1954, the orchestra, chorus and soloists toured the United States, and its performances were broadcast on local stations.
