= James Melton =

American opera singer

- James Melton in a 1940s studio portrait
- Born: January 2, 1904; Moultrie, Georgia, U.S.
- Died: April 21, 1961 (aged 57); New York City, U.S.
- Occupations: Singer, actor

James Melton (January 2, 1904 – April 21, 1961), a popular singer in the 1920s and early 1930s, later began a career as an operatic singer when tenor voices went out of style in popular music around 1932–35. His singing talent was similar to that of his contemporary Richard Crooks and baritones John Charles Thomas and Nelson Eddy, who sang popular music but also had operatic careers.

Melton usually catered to popular music fans, singing romantic songs and popular ballads in a sweet style. He was born in Moultrie, Georgia, but was raised in Citra, Florida, where his parents grew melons and handled hogs. Melton's father ran a sawmill in the time of history when some sawmills were temporary tent buildings built near available lumber trees.

In 1920, he graduated from high school in Ocala, Florida, and then attended college at the University of Florida, Vanderbilt University, and the University of Georgia. He received vocal instruction from Gaetano de Luca in Nashville from 1923 to 1927 before moving to New York, where he studied with Beniamino Gigli's teacher, Enrico Rosati. Melton also worked in dance bands, playing saxophone in a college jazz ensemble and performing with Francis Craig's Orchestra in Atlanta in 1926.

In 1946, he was invited to sing "Back home again in Indiana" at the pre-race ceremonies of the Indianapolis 500 race. It was the first race after the world War II and the first time the song was performed.

== Radio ==
The following year, he began singing on New York radio for no pay. He joined "Roxy's Gang", a cabaret group led by Samuel Roxy Rothafel, who worked with the Sieberling Singers. He made records for Victor Records, singing as one of the tenors with The Revelers and for Columbia Records with the same group under the pseudonym of The Singing Sophomores. He frequently sang with popular singer Jane Froman and appeared with her in film as well.

Melton recorded his first songs under his own name for Columbia in the autumn of 1927. He quickly became popular and made many vocal recordings also singing vocal choruses for dance records. By 1931, the Great Depression along with the rise of conservatism and a religious revival initiated a movement to more masculine sounding voices in popular music. Singers such as Franklyn Baur, Nick Lucas and Scrappy Lambert saw their careers diminish, while baritones such as Bing Crosby and Russ Columbo became popular. Tenor voices became viewed as outdated in popular music. Melton was forced to change paths and decided to try to continue his career with classical music. He began to train his voice with help from the pianist Michael Raucheisen in Berlin and gave his first concert performance at Town Hall on April 22, 1932, in New York and embarked on an American and Canadian concert tour along with songwriter George Gershwin in 1934.

Melton continued to perform on the radio. He was heard on The Firestone Hour in 1933, on Ward's Family Theater in 1935, The Sealtest Sunday Night Party (1936), The Palmolive Beauty Box Theater (1937), The Song Shop (1938), the Bell Telephone Hour (1940), Texaco Star Theater (1944) and Harvest of Stars (1945). In 1941, a newspaper columnist described Melton as "currently one of radio's busiest singers."

In the thirties, Melton also sang and acted on the Jack Benny radio shows.

== Films ==
Although he was not known as a dramatic actor, he appeared in movie musicals, including Stars Over Broadway (1935), Sing Me a Love Song (1936), Melody for Two (1937) and the MGM revue, Ziegfeld Follies (1946). An avid racing and automobile fan, Melton was in attendance for the Watkins Glen Grand Prix of 1951 in upstate New York. He is seen shaking hands with the racers in the 1999 documentary film about a classic race called Victory Circle

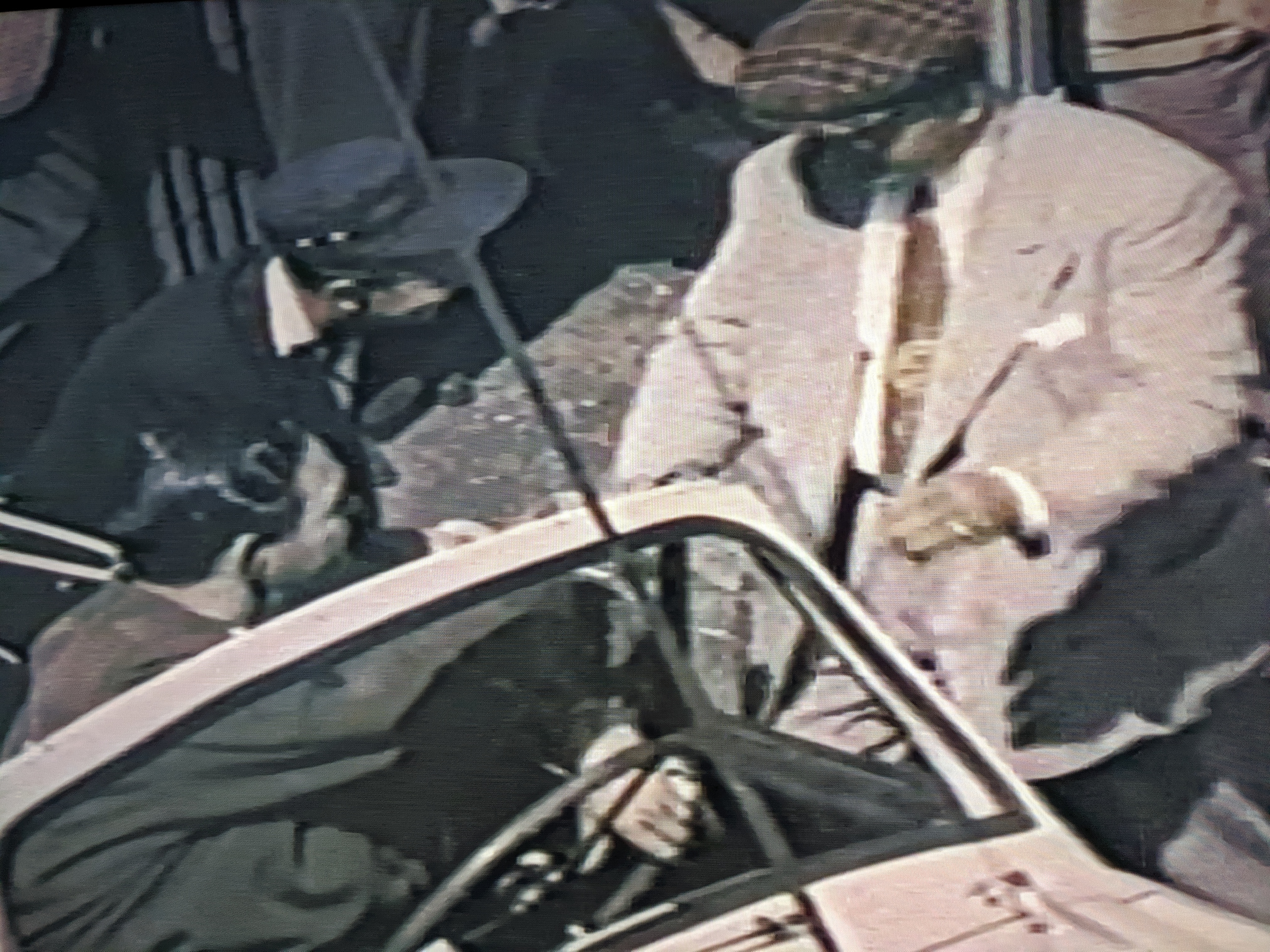
James Melton at the starting line of the 1951 Grand Prix Street Race at Watkins Glen NY

== Opera ==
After voice training with Angelo Canarutto, Melton's operatic singing career took off in 1938 when he appeared with the Cincinnati Zoo Opera Company as Pinkerton in Puccini's Madama Butterfly and also with the St. Louis Opera Company as Alfredo in Verdi's La Traviata. In 1939, he sang Pinkerton for his debut with the Philadelphia La Scala Opera Company with Annunciata Garrotto as Cio-cio-san. He worked with the Chicago Civic Opera from 1940 to 1942, appearing with Helen Jepson in Madama Butterfly, with Lily Pons in Donizetti's Lucia di Lammermoor, with Risë Stevens in Mignon and in Flotow's Martha. On 7 December 1942, Melton debuted at the Metropolitan Opera as Tamino in Mozart's The Magic Flute. He continued to perform at the Met through 1950.

Melton spent the 1950s making records, singing in nightclubs, appearing on television, including Ford Festival (1951–1952) also known as The James Melton Show, and collecting rare automobiles. His last stage production was Sigmund Romberg's The Student Prince.

== Later life ==
In 1948, he established the Melton Museum in Norwalk, Connecticut, to showcase his growing collection of over 125 antique cars. In April 1953, the collection was moved to Hypoluxo, Florida, and renamed the James Melton Autorama, with greatly expanded and developed displays. American automotive writer Ken Purdy interviewed him on his collection and wrote a book about it. The museum's collection was dispersed after his death.

Melton has two stars on the Hollywood Walk of Fame, one is for radio and the other for recordings of his.

Melton died of pneumonia at the age of 57 in New York City in 1961.
