= Palmolive (brand) =

American brand of hygiene products

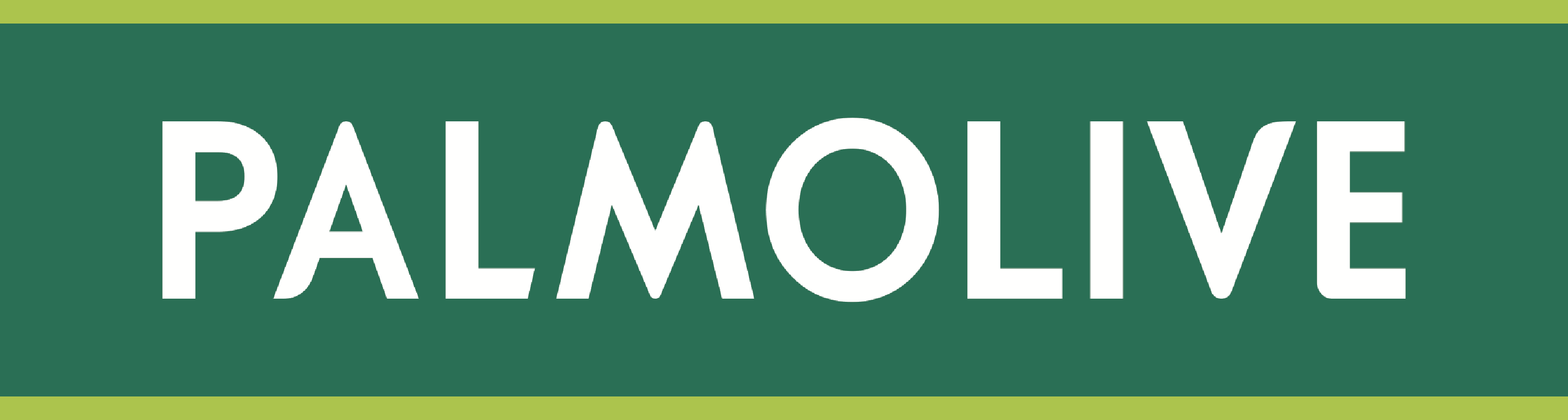
- Product type: Personal care; Dishwashing liquid
- Current owner: Colgate-Palmolive
- Country: United States
- Introduced: 1898; 128 years ago
- Markets: Worldwide
- Website: www.palmolive.com

Palmolive (US: /ˌpɑːlmˈɒlɪv/, UK also /ˌpɑːm-/) is an American multinational brand of a line of products produced by Colgate-Palmolive. The Palmolive brand grew from one product, Palmolive bar soap. Made of coconut, palm and olive oils, Palmolive bar soap was introduced in 1898. Originally, the bar soap floated like Procter & Gamble's Ivory. By the turn of the 20th century, Palmolive was the world's best-selling soap.

Current Palmolive range of products include dishwashing liquid as well as personal care products such as shampoo, hair conditioner, shower gel, bar soap, and liquid hand-wash.

== History ==
In 1864, Burdette Jay Johnson (1826–1902) founded the B.J. Johnson Co. in Milwaukee producing soap, candles and cheese.

=== Brand introduction ===
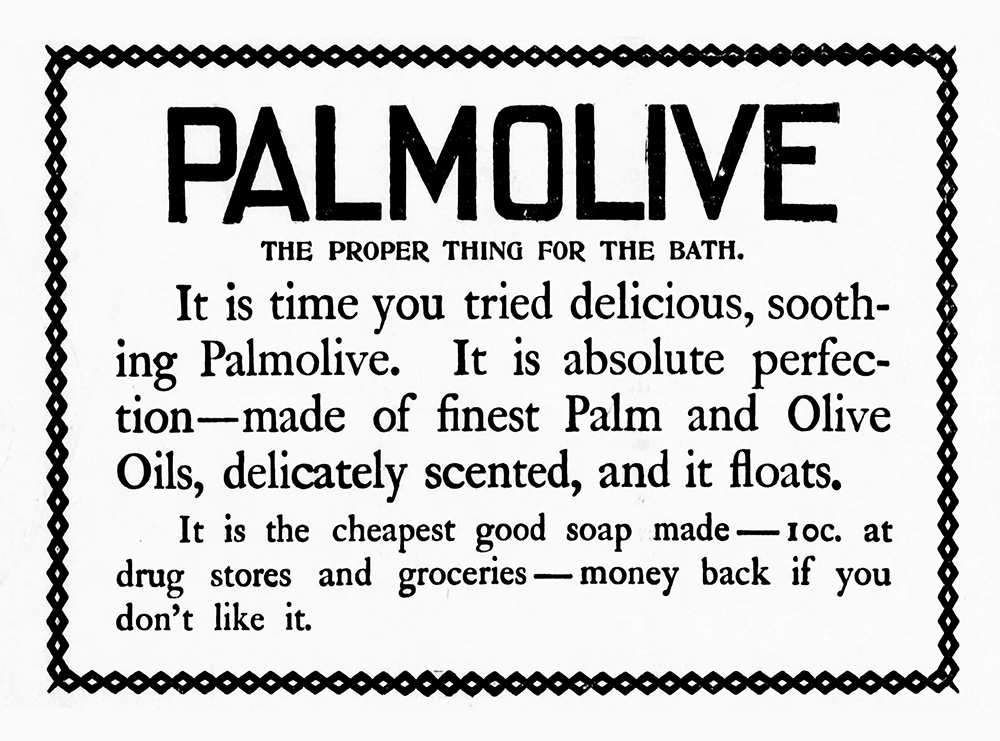
Palmolive bar soap advertisement, The Oshkosh Northwestern, Oshkosh, Wisconsin, May 20, 1899

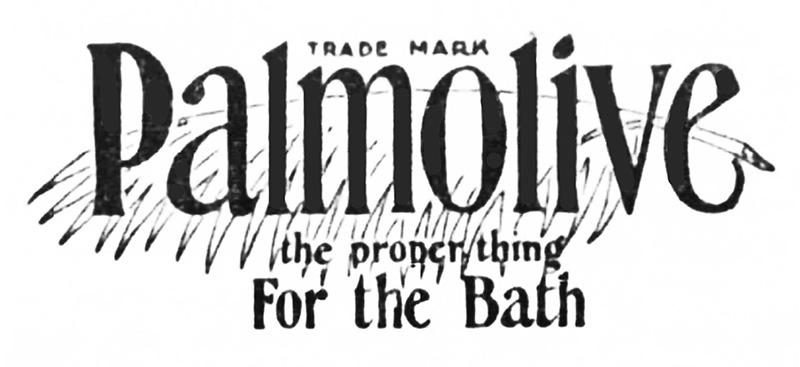
Palmolive soap logo circa 1899

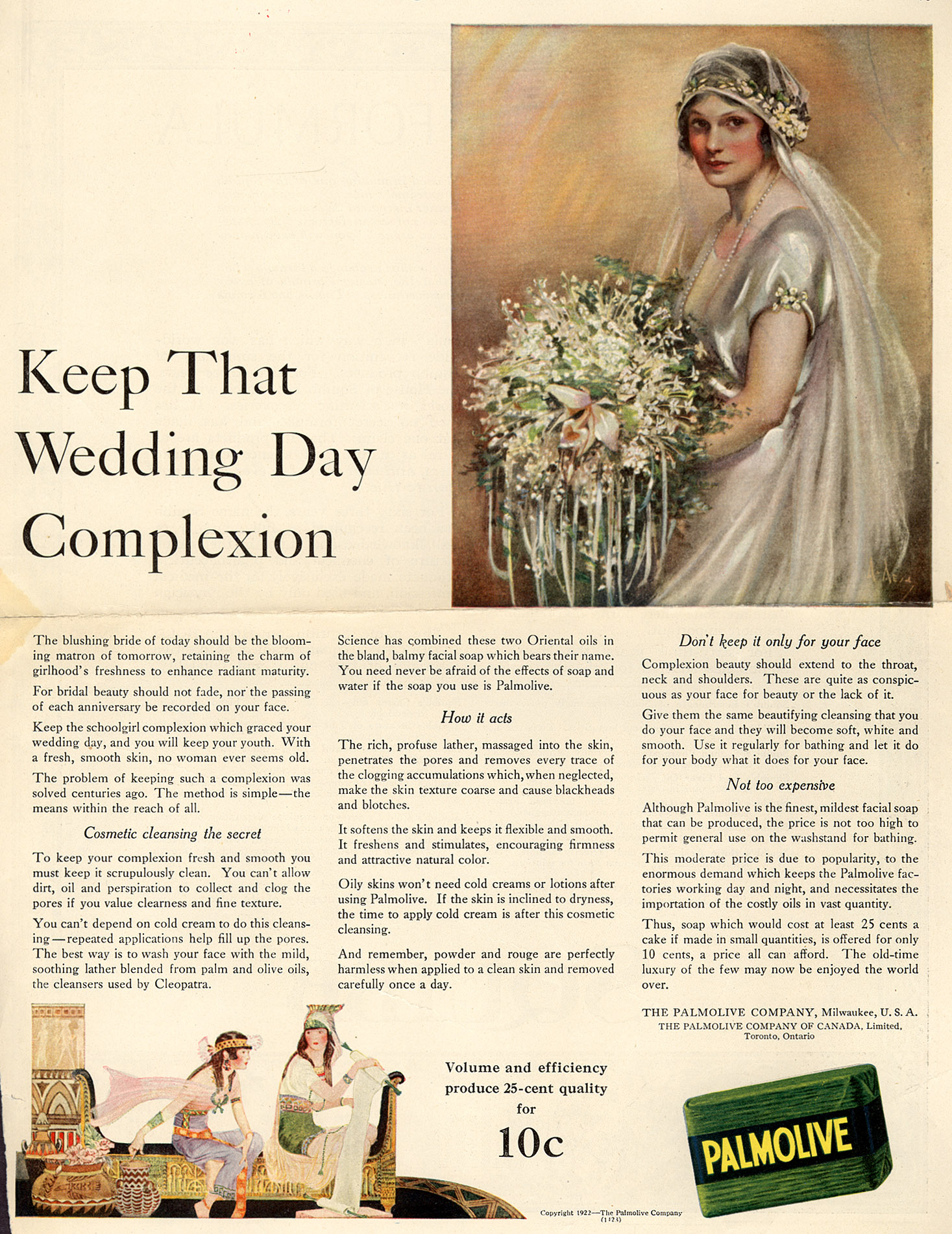
1922 advertisement for Palmolive soap

In 1898, the company introduced a pale, olive-green-colored, floating bar of soap made of coconut, palm and olive oils aggressively marketed under the brand name "Palmolive". The soap became very popular, due to an advertising campaign promoting it as the type of soap that would have been favored in ancient Egypt by the Pharaohs and especially "the Pharaoh's Daughter".

In just two years, Palmolive bar soap was the world's best-selling soap. Originally, Palmolive Soap marketing claimed the soap contained "Genuine Malaga (Spain) Olive Oil, the Oil of Palms, Glycerine, and the Oil of Lamb's Wool, Super-fatted with Cocoa Butter, the celebrated skin food". By 1925, the olive oil was said to be "Italian".

Johnson's son Caleb Johnson became president of the company and in 1917 changed its name to "Palmolive Soap Co.".

The soap was extensively advertised, including the radio programs The Palmolive Hour (1927-1931) and Palmolive Beauty Box Theater (1934-1937).

=== Palmolive brand extensions ===
Palmolive Shaving Cream was introduced in 1920. Its formula included the brand's familiar palm oil and olive oil.

=== Other products ===
Palmolive Co. also produced other cleaning products. Among them was "Salt Water Soap", a circa 1920 bar soap specially produced and wrapped for use by passengers onboard United States Lines ships. "China Soap", a circa 1919 bar soap aimed at homemakers to be used in washing dishes. and "Green Arrow Pure Soap", a "laundry and cleaning" soap which contained olive oil and naphtha patented in 1920.

=== Merger with Peet Brothers Soap Company ===
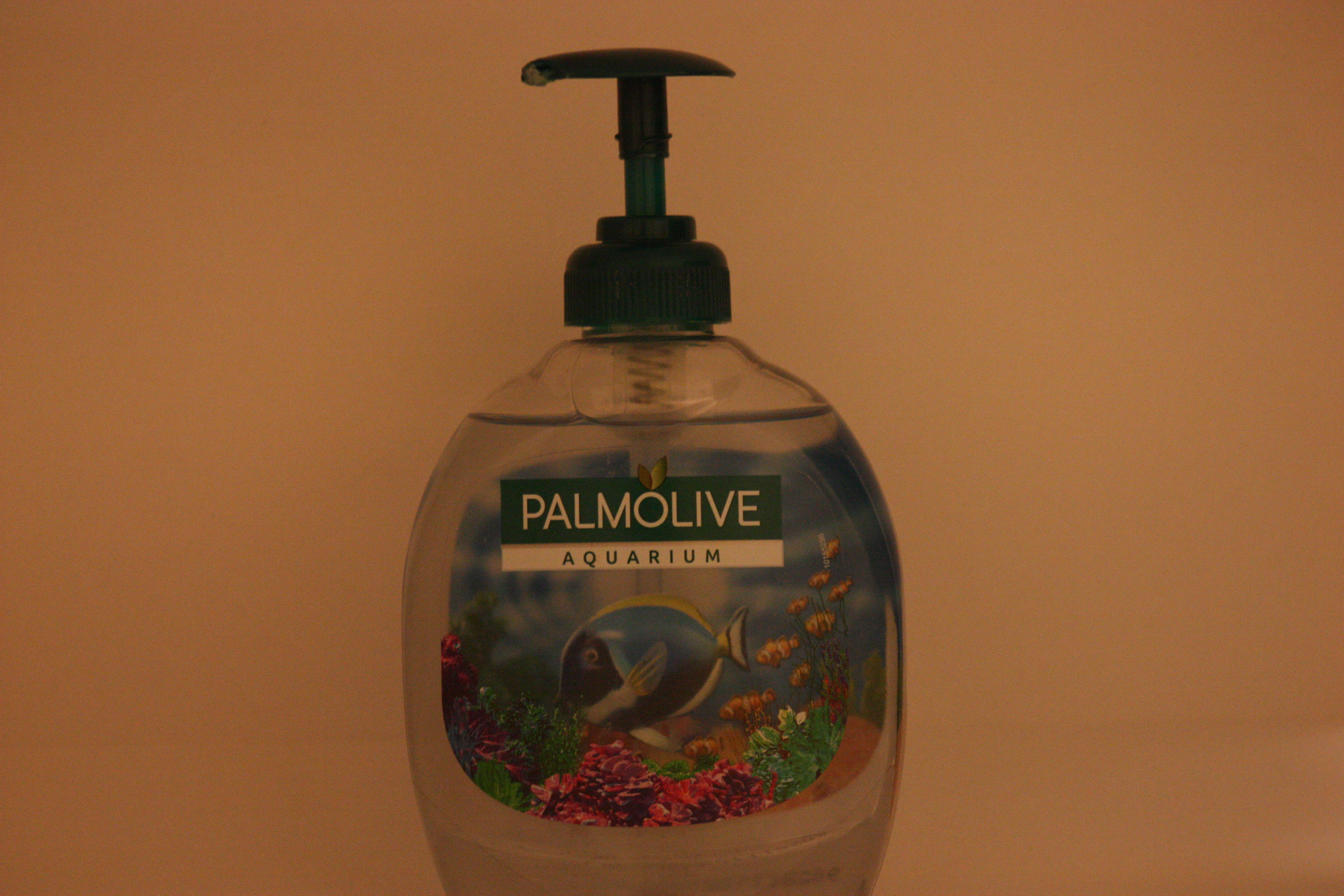
Palmolive Aquarium soap

In 1926 Charles S. Pierce, then president of Palmolive Soap Co. announced "tentative plans for the consolidation" of the Milwaukee-based Palmolive Soap company and the Peet Brothers Soap Company of Kansas City. It was said at the time the combined company assets would exceed US$45,000,000 (equivalent to $818,000,000 in 2025). Peet Brothers' soap products were sold both nationally and internationally. Its brands included "Crystal White" soap in bar and chipped flake forms made with cottonseed and coconut oils, Ben-Hur "White Bleaching" laundry bar soap, Seafood Naphtha Soap powder and "CremeOil", a "toilet, bath and shampoo" bar soap made with olive and coconut oils.

=== Merger with Colgate Co. ===
In June 1928, rumors started within the investment community that "officials of the Palmolive-Peet Co. are negotiating to purchase the Colgate Co." privately held by the Colgate family. It was reported the combined assets of the merged company would exceed $66,000,000 (equivalent to $1.238×10^{9} in 2025).

The merger combined the three oldest and largest soap and perfumery companies in the US and was effective July 1, 1928. The combined company was named the "Colgate Palmolive Peet Company. The combined pre-merger sales in 1927 of the three companies exceeded $100,000,000 (equivalent to $1.875×10^{9} in 2025). The newly combined company had seven US manufacturing facilities as well as factories in 14 foreign countries.

In 1953, the companies became a joint venture, known as the Colgate-Palmolive Company.
