= If I Could Tell You (song) =

1940 song composed by Idabelle Firestone

"If I Could Tell You" is a popular American song composed in 1940 by Idabelle Firestone to words by Madeleine Marshall.

== Background ==
Idabelle Firestone was the wife of the industrialist Harvey Firestone. An accomplished songwriter, she composed "If I Could Tell You" as the opening theme for the radio, and later television, music program The Voice of Firestone. The show was sponsored by her husband's company, Firestone Tires. An earlier song by Idabelle Firestone, "In My Garden", was used as the program's closing theme.

"In My Garden" had been the program's opening theme until a composers' dispute in 1940 caused it to be temporarily banned from use by the American Society of Composers, Authors and Publishers (ASCAP). To replace it, Mrs. Firestone wrote "If I Could Tell You" which became even more popular.

"If I Could Tell You" has received a number of commercial recordings. It is most identified with the singers Richard Crooks and Eleanor Steber, who served as frequent hosts on the Firestone program in the 1940s and 1950s, respectively. Crooks and Steber both recorded the song for RCA Victor. In 1995, tenor John Aler included it in an album of 20th-century ballads recorded by Delos Records.
