= Conrad Thibault =

American opera singer

Conrad Thibault in 1948

Conrad Thibault (November 13, 1903 – August 1, 1987) was an American baritone vocalist who frequently appeared on radio, recordings, and concert tours.

== Early years ==
Thibault was born and raised in Northampton, Massachusetts, where he was involved with the church choir. Local resident Calvin Coolidge took notice of him and encouraged him to apply for a scholarship at the Curtis Institute of Music, from which he later graduated. He also graduated from the Juilliard School and was a student of Emilio de Gogorza, who became his mentor.

== Career ==
Thibault's professional career began in the late 1920s with the Philadelphia Grand Opera Company. His operatic debut came in 1928 in Puccini's Manon.

By the early 1930s, he was a regular performer on radio, appearing on such shows as His Master's Voice of the Air, The Maxwell House Showboat, The RCA Victor Show, Music in the Air, and as featured soloist with the orchestras of Ferde Grofé and Gustave Haenschen among others. Thibault sang in the radio premiere of “The Maxwell House Show Boat” on June 15, 1933. In 1934-1935, he had the singing role of Jack Hamilton on The Gibson Family on NBC radio. In 1946-1947, he was a singer on The American Melody Hour radio program on the Blue Network/CBS. He also was heard regularly on The Chicago Theater of the Air, The Rochester Philharmonic Orchestra broadcasts, The Joe Cook Show, and The Packard Hour.

He made several 78 rpm recordings for the RCA Victor Red Seal label. He was also heard on numerous radio transcriptions produced and recorded by the World Broadcasting Company. Decca Records released several 78 rpm sides by Conrad Thibault in the 1940s.

In 1949 he became emcee for the ABC Television show The Jacques Fray Music Room, holding that position from August through October. In the 1950s he sang for the inauguration of President Dwight D. Eisenhower.

Thibault's repertoire was varied, including baroque arias, spirituals, Wagnerian opera, art songs, Broadway tunes, and patriotic songs. He was known to be personable in concerts, and was expressive with his hands.

== Later years ==
In his later years, Thibault taught voice in New York at the Manhattan School of Music and in Florida at Palm Beach Atlantic College.

== Personal life ==
Thibault's first wife was Madeleine Gagne, whom he met when they both acted in an amateur production in Northampton, Massachusetts. They married when he was 20, and she died seven years later. He married Eleanor Kendall in 1935. The couple divorced in 1939. In 1942, he married Mary Clare West, a marriage which also ended in divorce in 1950. His fourth wife, Dee Thibault, died in 1986.

== Death ==
A resident of Far Rockaway, Queens, Thibault died at St. John's Episcopal Hospital in Far Rockaway at the age of 83. He was survived by a son, William.

== Partial discography ==
Decca Records

- 23346 - The House I Live In / I Spoke to Jefferson at Guadalcanal (1944)
- 24126 - Suzanne, Suzanne, Pretty One / Ah, Suzette Dear (1946)
- 24127 - Marianne's Loves / Pity Poor Mam'selle Zizi (1946)
- 24128 - Come Dance, Codaine / When Your Potato's Done (1946)

Montgomery Ward Records

- 6059 - You Alone / Shortnin' Bread (1933)

(RCA) Victor Records

- 1583 - De Captaine Of De Marguerite / Sea Fever
- 1626 - Less than Dust / The Temple Bells
- 1636 - Kashmiri Song / 'Till I Wake
- 1677 - Novembre / Plaisir d'Amour
- 1679 - The Shepherdess / Passing By
- 11829 - Where'er You Walk / Dedication; Our Native Land; Marie (1935)
- 24404 - Last Roundup / Shortnin' Bread (1933)
- 24423 - Love Is the Sweetest Thing / Day You Came Along (1933)
- 24424 - It's Only a Paper Moon / This Is Romance (1933)
- 24465 - Yesterdays / You Alone (1933)

== Sources ==
- Billboard, vol. 56, no. 32, Aug 5, 1944 page 21.
- BroadwayWorld.com "Conrad Thibault". Retrieved June 10, 2010.
- Brooks, Tim and Marsh, Earle (2007). The Complete Directory to Prime Time Network and Cable TV Shows, 1946–Present. Ballantine, New York. ISBN 978-0-345-49773-4.
- Curtis Institute of Music, Overtones, 1929, volume 2, page 44.
- Internet Movie Database, "Conrad Thibault". Retrieved June 10, 2010.
- Nauck, Kurt. Catalogue: Vintage Record Auction Number 38.
- The New York Times, "Mrs. Thibault Gets Divorce From Singer", October 21, 1939, page 7.
- The New York Times, "Conrad Thibault Dies; An Ex-Radio Vocalist", August 4, 1987.
- Settlemier, Tyrone and Abrams, Steven. "The Online Discographical Project - Decca 23000 series". Retrieved June 10, 2010
- Settlemier, Tyrone and Abrams, Steven. "The Online Discographical Project - Decca 24000 series". Retrieved June 10, 2010
- Settlemier, Tyrone and Abrams, Steven. "The Online Discographical Project - Montgomery Ward 6000 series". Retrieved June 10, 2010
- Settlemier, Tyrone and Abrams, Steven. "The Online Discographical Project - Victor 24000 series". Retrieved June 10, 2010
- Upton, Charlotte, "Thibault Wins Huge Audience", The Spokesman-Review (Spokane, WA), April 1, 1955, page 5.
