= Franklyn Baur =

Vocal artist (1903–1950)

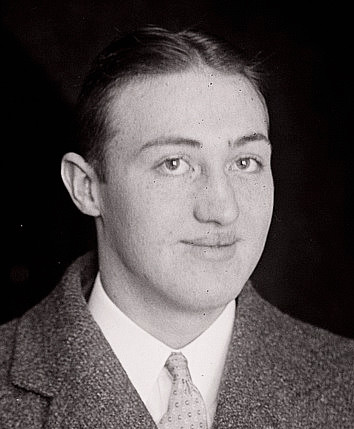
Franklyn Baur,1925

Franklyn Baur (April 5, 1903 – February 24, 1950) was a popular tenor vocal recording artist.

Baur was born in New York and educated at Amherst. At 19, he was selected from over 50 candidates as principal tenor in the Park Avenue Baptist Church known as the John D. Rockefeller Church. His grandfather on the maternal side held the same position for many years in Henry Ward Beecher's Brooklyn church.

== Featured vocalist ==
Baur made hundreds of recordings for about a dozen different recording companies, including the three major labels, Victor, Columbia and Brunswick. His first recording, If the Rest of the World Don't Want You, was for Victor in 1923. Baur recorded for Victor as a featured soloist; as one of the vocalists for Nat Shilkret and the Victor Orchestra; with Roger Wolfe Kahn and His Orchestra; and on occasion, as the vocalist for Paul Whiteman's orchestra, with many of his recordings being listed by Joel Whitburn as "charted." The Encyclopedic Discography of Victor Recordings (EDVR) lists detailed information for Baur's Victor recordings.

Baur first recorded for Columbia in 1924, with many more Columbia recordings to follow, and for other labels, including Brunswick, Banner, Domino, Emerson, Gennett, Grey Gull, Puritan, Oriole, and Regal, often using pseudonyms.

Baur's first stage appearance was in the Ziegfeld Follies of 1927, in which he was a featured vocalist. The show starred Eddie Cantor. He became the highest salaried ballad singer on the radio during the 1920s.

== The Revelers ==
Franklyn Baur may best be known as a member of The Revelers, an extremely popular group of the 1920s (four singers and a pianist). Members of the group had been recording as The Shannon Four when pianist Frank Black recruited Baur and wrote new, jazz-oriented arrangements. The group's new sound, highlighted by Baur's enthusiastic vocals (embellished with his own syncopated effects and punctuations) revitalized the group, which soared in popularity. (A 1928 estimate by Victor Records reported that The Revelers typically sold 71,900 copies of any given record, while the label's other vocal stars sold as few as 10,740 copies.) The Revelers with Baur also sang under numerous pseudonyms and sponsorships.

The Revelers, with Baur unobtrusively conducting the group with rhythmic hand gestures, appeared in three pioneer movie musicals, filmed by Vitaphone in 1927. Only the first one is available for viewing today: The Revelers (1927), recently restored by The Vitaphone Project, is a one-reel short showing the group performing "Mine," "Dinah," and "No Foolin'." Due to the limitations of the primitive sound production, the group was forced to perform the entire nine-minute set in one continuous, uninterrupted take, with the camera in a fixed position. The second short, filmed the same day and also titled The Revelers, awaits restoration. It features another three songs: "I'm in Love Again", "De Gaspel Train", and "Nola". The third Vitaphone reel, yet again titled The Revelers, was held back from release until October 1928. The short features "Sing", "Just Around the Corner", and "Oh! Miss Hannah".

Abel Green of Variety reviewed the third Vitaphone short and gave Franklyn Baur a glowing notice: "Baur, by the manner of direction and incidental expression, aside from his vocal prowess, is a corking talking-screen bet. The tenor last season was in a Broadway musical and now impresses anew for the screen. He is of the Conrad Nagel-Wally Reid personality class." The film had been produced in 1927 but held back from release until October 1928, by which time Franklyn Baur had already left The Revelers to pursue a solo career.

== As soloist ==
Baur's most notable radio broadcasts were for the well-known Voice of Firestone (initially titled The Firestone Hour). He was one of the soloists on Firestone's first broadcast in December 1928 and remained with Firestone through May 1930, after which his contract was not renewed because he had asked for compensation, in addition to his generous weekly broadcast fee, to perform at a company function. Following his dismissal by Firestone, Baur's career declined. In 1931, he went to France to take voice lessons, and he gave a recital in December 1933 at Town Hall in New York City.

His record producer, Gus Haenschen, recalled: "He toured as a recitalist for another two years, maybe more, but as happened with other pop-music tenors before him, he sang too often — he was still on radio, too — and some of the arias he chose for his recitals were wrong for his voice. He developed a nodule on one of his vocal cords, and unfortunately the operation to remove the node wasn’t successful and left him with an impaired voice. That’s what shortened his career."

== Personal life ==
Franklyn Baur died on February 24, 1950, aged 46, of a heart ailment at his home in New York City.
