= Lamont School of Music =

Music school of the University of Denver

Coordinates: 39°40′27″N 104°57′37″W

Lamont School of Music and Theater is part of the College of Arts Humanities and Social Sciences at the University of Denver, based in Denver, Colorado, United States. The school offers a range of undergraduate and graduate programs in music performance, music studies, music pedagogy, musicology, composition, and recording and production.

== History ==
The school is named after its founder, Florence Lamont Hinman (née Lamont; 1888–1964), a teacher of voice and piano. Despite being located in a separate location from Denver University's main campus for many years, the Lamont School of Music persevered, and was poised for expansion and development. Both followed with the appointment of the school's fifth director, F. Joseph Docksey. In 1988, the Lamont School of Music's enrollment totaled 116 music majors at both the graduate and undergraduate levels; by 2001, enrollment jumped to 256; and by 2007, the school had reached its strategic enrollment cap of 300 music majors. In February 2004, the Lamont School of Music was recognized by the city of Denver with the Mayor's Award for Excellence in the Arts. In February 2005, the Lamont School of Music was recognized by the city of Denver with the Mayor's Award for Excellence in the Arts. 2011 marked the appointment of Lamont's sixth director, Nancy Cochran, followed by Keith Ward in 2018.

In 2026 Lamont was reformed as the Lamont School of Music and Theater under the direction of Brian Pertl who became director in 2025.

=== Lamont Summer Academy ===
In 2008, the Lamont Summer Academy was established by Constance Cook Glen at Director F. Joseph Docksey's request. The Academy is a two-week intensive and immersive summer music camp for grades 8-12. Students fly in from different parts of the country or drive to the camp where they take part in ensemble playing, chamber music, performance classes, theory classes, composition classes, and solo repertoire. An audition is required to gain acceptance to the Academy. The experience has been said to be influential and transformational by students from the program.

=== Former locations ===
In 1922, upon the death of Margaret Berger (née Kountze), widow of William B. Berger (1839–1890), Lamont moved her school into the Berger house at 1170 Sherman Street, Denver, where it was used as a conservatory until 1941, when the Lamont School merged with the University of Denver and moved into the former home of John Sidney Brown (1833–1913) at 909 Grant Street. Hinman continued to direct the school until her retirement in 1952. In 1941, the school merged with the University of Denver. The Berger mansion was demolished in 1942 and the Brown mansion was demolished in 1968.

== Faculty and alumni ==
=== Notable faculty ===
- Robert Davine (Professor of Accordion and Music Theory, 1924 - 2001) - established one of the three major academic programs at the college level for the accordion within the United States as part of a course of study culminating in an Artist Diploma in Concert Accordion Performance in the late 1950s.
- Ricardo Iznaola (Professor Emeritus of Guitar; Professor of Guitar from 1983-2015; former Chair of the Guitar and Harp Department and former Director of the Conservatory Program)
- Sean Friar (Chair of Composition Department) - Recipient of the 2011 Rome Prize in Music Composition.
- Igor Pikayzen, (Professor of Violin) - 2nd prize in the Henryk Szeryng violin competition and Kloster-Schöntal; 1st prize winner of Wronski and Viña Del Mar violin competitions
- Remy Le Boeuf (Chair of Jazz & Commercial Music Studies; Assistant Professor of Composition 2022-Present) - 4x Grammy Nominee.
- Steven Mayer, (Professor of Piano) - Winner Grand Prix du Disque Liszt for his recording of Liszt's Piano Concerto No. 3, De Profundis, and Totentanz with the London Symphony Orchestra (ASV 1992); recognized by Gramophone magazine for best performance of Weber's Konzertstück in F minor (from his Liszt vs Thalberg recording, ASV 1993), and top 3 recording of Charles Ives' Concord Sonata (Naxos 2002).

=== Notable alumni ===
- Jean Dickenson
- Cedar Walton
