= The Song Shop (radio series) =

American radio musical variety series (1937–1938)

The Song Shop is an American radio musical variety program that was broadcast on CBS from September 10, 1937, through June 3, 1938. Episodes featured old and new songs, with the highlight each week being a skit that combined music and dialogue to relate the story of a song.

The Song Shop featured soprano Kitty Carlisle and baritone Reed Kennedy, and Frank Crumit was the host. The soloists were backed by a 22-person male glee club, and Gustave Haenschen directed a 47-piece orchestra to accompany them. Alice Cornett was a "rhythm singer" (or "swing singer"), and the Song Shop Quartette also performed. In January 1938, Carlisle left the show because of the time demands of the program and the Broadway show in which she was starring. A series of guest singers succeeded her, beginning with Virginia Rea. Also in 1938, Nadine Conner was added as mistress of ceremonies. Guests who appeared on the show included Arthur Schwartz, James Melton, Nino Martini, and Singin' Sam.

The 45-minute show was initially broadcast at 10 p.m. Eastern Time on Fridays. In January 1938 it was moved to 9 p.m. E. T. Coca-Cola was the sponsor.

== Critical response ==
A review in the trade publication Motion Picture Daily said that The Song Shop "should be marked a 'must' program." The reviewer acknowledged never having been a fan of the individual performers on the program but added that after hearing the premiere broadcast, "we are compelled to revise our estimation of their worth. Each was more than excellent."

Another trade publication, Radio Daily, said in October 1937 that the show "has improved itself here and there", with the reviewed episode being "one of the most memorable in the series to date. The review cited Carlisle's performance as having "particular sparkle in her warbling and patter". It also complimented the rest of the cast for good work and said that the "whole program moved along at a nice clip."
