= Triolet (disambiguation) =

A triolet is a poetic form that is eight lines long.

Triolet may also refer to:

- Triolet (crater), a crater on Mars
- Triolet, Mauritius, a village in the north of Mauritius
- Aiguille de Triolet, a mountain in the Alps
- a variant of Scrabble

== People with the surname ==
- Elsa Triolet (1896-1970), French writer

== See also ==
- The Triolettes, a 1930s American band
