= Josephine Antoine =

American opera singer

Josephine Antoine (October 27, 1907 – October 30, 1971) was a coloratura soprano, who sang at the Metropolitan Opera from 1936 through 1948 in 76 appearances, and was well known in "Un ballo in maschera", "Il barbiere di Siviglia", "Les contes d'Hoffmann", "Le Coq d'Or", "Don Giovanni", "Lucia di Lammermoor", "Mignon", "Parsifal", "Rigoletto", and "Die Zauberflöte."

She made at least six commercial recordings for Columbia, but there may be more. Her career also included radio where she appeared on "Chevrolet Musical Moments Revue" in 1937. Miss Antoine was a regular star on NBC Radio's "The Carnation Contented Hour" ("The Melody Hour," without commercials, at Armed Forces Radio Service) with Percy Faith during World War II.

Miss Antoine was a favorite at Chautauqua Institution, New York where she had been soloist for many seasons. Hence she was affectionately known as "Chautauqua's Sweetheart."

== Early life ==
Josephine Louise Antoine was born in Denver, Colorado, on October 27, 1907. She was adopted while still a baby by Mr. and Mrs. Arthur H. By 1914, her foster family had moved to Boulder.

== Training ==
In 1921, Antoine began studying voice with Alexander Grant, a faculty member at the University of Colorado, and continued with him until she graduated from the University of Colorado with a Bachelor of Arts in 1929. That same year she won the Atwater Kent Audition Contest which provided her with scholarship money and the opportunity to go to the east coast to study vocal music. She also received the first Master of Music degree ever granted by University of Colorado. In 1930-31 she studied at Curtis Institute of Music in Philadelphia, and from 1931 to 1934 studied at Juilliard in New York City.

She trained under the legendary Marcella Sembrich at Curtis and Juilliard, with whom she was often compared. Her voice was remarkable for its bell-like quality in the high register as well as its warmth and power throughout the entire vocal range. Arthur Bodansky conductor at the Metropolitan Opera heard her sing in a student performance of Strauss' "Ariadne Auf Naxos" and arranged an audition with Giulio Gatti-Casazza, General Manager of the Metropolitan Opera.

== Operatic career ==
In 1935 Josephine Antoine signed with the Met and subsequently she made her debut in 1936 as Philine in "Mignon", broadcast on January 4, 1936.

Her career with the Met lasted through February 28, 1948. During this period she also sang for other opera companies including the Chicago Opera, the San Francisco Opera, the Cincinnati Opera and the Chautauqua Opera.

== Concert career ==
Josephine Antoine was an internationally known artist. She toured throughout the United States, Canada, Newfoundland and Puerto Rico appearing as soloist with orchestras in Cincinnati, Cleveland, Worcester, Massachusetts, Washington, D. C., and the southwest (The Chautauquan Daily; August 18, 1962). The peak of her touring occurred during the 1938–1940 seasons when Miss Antoine appeared on stages of the Allied Arts Events at Oklahoma State University (1939), the Santa Fe Concert Association (1939–40), the Sarasota Concert Association (1938–39), and the Wisconsin Union Theater (1938–39), in addition to her responsibilities at the Metropolitan Opera.

== Radio career ==
Outside of incidental occasions such as with Bing Crosby on KPO, October 22, 1936, Miss Antoine appeared for some years on "The Carnation Contented Hour" radio program. According to Frank Buxton and Bill Owen's "The Big Broadcast 1920–1950", (1972), the Carnation Contented Hour was a long-running music program sponsored by the Carnation Milk Company. It first appeared on NBC in 1931. The music theme was "Contented." The program was a variety show originating from Chicago featuring Percy Faith and his orchestra (1940–1947). During the Antoine era key personnel included the orchestra, the Carnation Contented Chorus, Ralph Nyland, tenor; Reinhold Schmidt, bass; and Josephine Antoine, soprano. The announcer was Vincent Pelletier. Producers were Harry K. Gilman and C. H. Cottington.

During World War II, the Armed Forces Radio Service obtained rights to rebroadcast the program for the entertainment of military personnel. Commercial messages were edited out and the program was re-titled "The Melody Hour." It was a 30-minute show. Recordings were made on 16" electrical transcription discs for play back at 33 1/3 rpm over AFRS according to their schedules.

Jay Hickerson's compendium "The Ultimate History of Network Radio Programming and Guide to all Circulating Shows" (1992) indicates that during this era, the program was on NBC at 8:00 p. m. from October 31, 1932, and as of November 21, 1932, until September 26, 1949, then moved to 10:00 p. m. He reports that there are 43 recorded shows available, 36 bearing dates.

== Teaching career ==
After a successful opera career Miss Antoine taught at Indiana University (1947–48), University of Colorado (1948–49), Los Angeles Conservatory of Music (1950–53), University of Texas (1953–57), Arizona State University (1959–66), and at Eastman School of Music (1957–59, and 1966–71). She made her home in Rochester, New York, since 1966 and taught voice at Chautauqua Summer Schools.

== Colorado life ==
Miss Antoine sang concerts at Denver Auditorium in 1936 and 1945. She starred in "The Bartered Bride", Central City, 1940, and in "The Red Mill" for the Denver Post Opera, 1949. In 1948 she sang for the Colorado Memorial Center fund. Josephine Antoine was married to Edward Hinkle, program director at a radio station in Boulder. Their daughter Myra was born in 1949.

== Chautauqua life ==
Josephine Antoine made her debut with the Chautauqua Opera Association in 1933 in the title role of "Martha." That summer she also appeared for the first time with the Chautauqua Symphony Orchestra. In the traditions of Chautauqua her name is linked to "The Last Rose of Summer", a song with which she closed her appearances in the Amphitheater. In neighboring Jamestown, New York, she appeared as soloist for the Mozart Club and the Jamestown Civic Orchestra.

== Death ==
On October 30, 1971, Josephine Antoine died of heart failure, aged 64, in Jamestown, New York, the day after her daughter, Myra Louise, was married. At the time of her death she was a professor of voice at the Eastman School of Music. Much of her opera memorabilia was given to the Sibley Music Library at the University of Rochester.

== Verified discography ==
1. Columbia 69813D; WXCO26299; Jewel Song (Gounod, Faust); WXCO26300; Polonaise: Je Suis Titania (Thomas, Mignon); Josephine Antoine, soprano, with Wilfrid Pelletier conducting the Columbia Opera Orchestra; 12" 78 rpm phonorecord dating from 1939.
2. Columbia 71025-D; XCO29327; Lo! Here the Gentle Lark (Shakespeare-Bishop); XCO29333; The Russian Nightingale (Liebling-Alabiev); Josephine Antoine, soprano with Henry J. Bove, flute, and Stuart Ross, piano; 12" 78 rpm phonorecord dating from 1940.
3. Columbia 17276-D; CO29330; My Mother Bids Me Bind My Hair (Hume-Haydn); CO29332; Když mne stará matka zpívat učívala (Songs My Mother Taught Me, Heyduk-Dvorak); Josephine Antoine, soprano with Stuart Ross, piano; 10" 78 rpm phonorecord dating from 1940.
4. Chevrolet Musical Moments Revue: Prog. No. 364; 1937; World Broadcasting System (Western Electric Wide Range Recording); Audio Cassette from Esoteric Sound, original 16" 33 1/3 rpm electrical transcription disc. Gus Haenschen, conductor; Josephine Antoine, coloratura soprano; Casper Reardon, harp; Songsmiths, male quartet; orchestra; Graham McNamee, announcer.
5. Chevrolet Musical Moments Revue: Prog. No. 368; 1937; World Broadcasting System (Western Electric Wide Range Recording); Audio Cassette from Esoteric Sound, original 16" 33 1/3 rpm electrical transcription disc. Gus Haenschen, conductor; Josephine Antoine, coloratura soprano; Reed Lawton, baritone; Songsmiths, male quartet; orchestra; Prof. John Look, commercial; Graham McNamee, announcer.
6. Armed Forces Radio Service; Melody Hour (NBC Carnation Contented Hour*): Prog. No. 60; 9/4/44; 16" 33 1/3 rpm electrical transcription disc. *Without commercials. Percy Faith, conductor and arranger; Ralph Nyland, tenor; Reinhold Schmidt, bass; orchestra; chorus; Vincent Pelletier, announcer.
7. Armed Forces Radio Service; Melody Hour (NBC Carnation Contented Hour*): Prog. No. 63; 10/2/44; 16" 33 1/3 rpm electrical transcription disc.
8. Armed Forces Radio Service; Melody Hour (NBC Carnation Contented Hour*): Prog. No. 82; 4/16/45; 16" 33 1/3 rpm electrical transcription disc.
9. Armed Forces Radio Service; Melody Hour (NBC Carnation Contented Hour*): Prog. No. 99; 8/13/45; 16" 33 1/3 rpm electrical transcription disc.
10. Armed Forces Radio Service; Melody Hour (NBC Carnation Contented Hour*): Prog. No. 110; 11/5/45; two, one sided 16" 33 1/3 rpm electrical transcription discs.
11. Eclipse EKR CD 46; The American Prima Donna, 1995; Josephine Antoine's broadcast of 1940 with Lionel Barrymore as Master of Ceremonies; With other artists: Rosa Ponselle, Marguerite Namara, Mary McCormic, Jeanette MacDonald, Dorothy Maynor, Thelma Votipka, and Grace Moore.
12. Walhall Records (CD) WHL2; Wolfgang Amadeus Mozart: Die Zauberflöte (The Magic Flute), 1994; From broadcast of December 26, 1942 with other artists: Jarmila Novotná, Charles Kullman, Ezio Pinza, John Brownlee, Lillian Raymondi, John Garris, Norman Cordon, Eleanor Steber, Maxine Stellman, Anna Kaskas, Marita Farell, Mona Paulee, Helen Olheim, Louis D'Anngelo, John Dudley, Emery Darcy, John Gurney, and Bruno Walter Conductor.
13. Studio Couch (CD from an LP audiodisc); Honegger: King David, 2005; Performance recorded on May 19, 1955 at the University of Colorado, College of Music; With other artists: Martha Miller (Contralto), Frank Barger (Tenor), Basil Rathbone (Narrator), University Choir and Festival Chorus, and Horace Jones, Conductor.
