= The Palmolive Hour =

Radio program

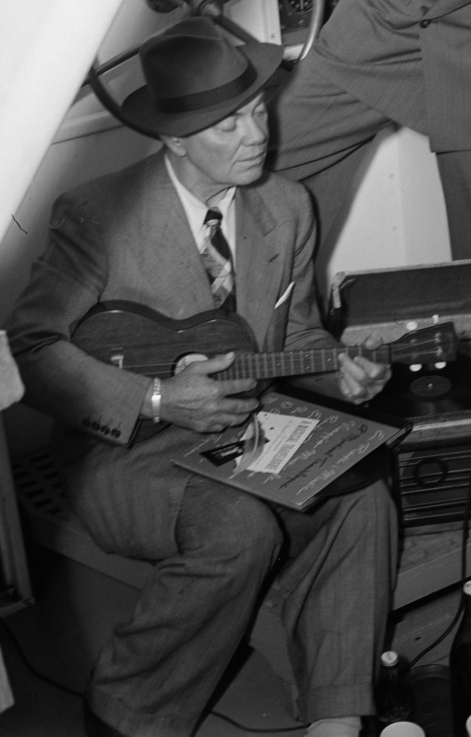
Cliff Edwards, a.k.a. Ukulele Ike

The Palmolive Hour was an American radio concert-variety program, sponsored by Palmolive Soap and broadcast on NBC from December 1927, to July 29, 1931. The Palmolive Musical Stock Company (a.k.a. the Palmolivers) offered a mix of jazz, show tunes and opera selections.

== Format and performers ==
The program usually opened with a duet by Frank Munn and soprano Virginia Rea. To call attention to the sponsor's product, they did not appear on the program under their own names but instead were introduced each week as Paul Oliver and Olive Palmer. Contralto Elizabeth Lennox was featured in duets with Rea. Gus Haenschen led the orchestra, with Frank Black at the piano. Other regular members of the cast were Wilfred Glenn, Lewis James, James Melton, Elliot Shaw, and the Revelers Quartet.

== Guest appearances ==
Fanny Brice was a guest on the program, and other broadcasts featured such guests as Vaughn De Leath, Gene Tunney, the Duncan Sisters, Cliff Edwards (a.k.a. Ukulele Ike), Cecil Lean, Cleo Mayfield, The Revelers and international operatic sopranos Claudia Muzio, of the Metropolitan Opera Company, and Edith Mason, of the Chicago Civic Opera Company. The announcers were Phillips Carlin and Alois Havrilla.

When the series came to an end during mid-summer 1931, only a few months lapsed before many associated with The Palmolive Hour were reunited on a new series that fall. Munn, Rea, Lennox, The Revelers and Haenschen all continued in the similar format of The American Album of Familiar Music. Munn stayed with that series until his retirement in 1945.

== See also ==
- Palmolive Beauty Box Theater (1934-1937)
