= Robert Davine =

- Born: Aubrey Robert Davine; April 5, 1924
- Died: November 25, 2001 (aged 77)
- Genres: Classical, tango
- Occupations: Musician, composer, arranger, educator
- Instrument: Accordion
- Years active: 1954-1999

Robert Davine (born Aubrey Robert Davine; April 5, 1924 – November 25, 2001) was an internationally recognized American concert accordionist and Professor of Accordion and Music Theory at the University of Denver's Lamont School of Music. As the chairman of the Department of Accordion for three decades, he is credited with establishing one of the few collegiate academic programs in advanced accordion studies offered in the United States during the 1950s. His concert performances of 20th century classical music with leading orchestras and chamber ensembles helped to demonstrate the accordion's suitability as an orchestral instrument on the modern concert hall stage.

== Biography ==
=== Early life and education ===
Robert Davine initiated his musical education on the piano as a young child. He was first exposed to the accordion at the age of ten. During the 1930s he encountered an accordionist who served as an accompanist in a Spanish dance troupe. The sight of the accompanist performing such an exotic instrument intrigued the young musician and his life long interest with the accordion took flight. As Davine grew older, performances of contemporary popular music in school concerts became more frequent. Davine's interest in classical music developed during his last years in high school while he was exposed to transcriptions of classical music. Private lessons with several noted accordionists and composers of the early 20th century in America soon followed. They included such musicians as: Joseph Biviano, Robert Delaney, John Kirkland, Joseph Mann, Anthony Pennetti, Andrew Rizzo, and John Serry in New York City. His interest in the integration of the accordion into the chamber music ensemble was encouraged by a Belgian violinist while he studied trumpet as an undergraduate student at Northwestern University. Davine completed his Bachelor of Arts in Music as well as his Masters of Music degrees in Chicago, Illinois at Northwestern University.

=== Career ===
Robert Davine emerged as the founder of the Lamont School of Music's Department of Accordion in the 1950s where he established and chaired an advanced course of study leading to an Artist Diploma in Concert Accordion Performance. During this time he married his wife Jacqueline in 1954. He also appeared in Chicago with the noted cellist Ennio Bolognini at Orchestra Hall and was invited to join the Mantovani Orchestra on its first tour in the United States. In addition, he concertized as a staff musician on WGN in Chicago during this time

By 1969 Robert Davine's artistry achieved international recognition. He eagerly traveled to Paris where he supervised a summer program of music studies in classical accordion and chamber music at the Paris American Academy. International interest in his artistry extended beyond Europe into the Far East as well. In 1984 he was one of the first academic scholars of music in America who were invited to contribute to the development of a modern program of instruction for the accordion in the People's Republic of China by the Chinese Musicians Association and the Ministry of Culture. Davine noted during his visit that the accordion apparently enjoyed widespread popularity in China by surviving the cultural revolution as a result of its widespread utilization in the performance of traditional revolutionary songs by choirs. Consequently, during his concert tour Davine emphasized contemporary 20th century music from America and Europe, conducted Master Classes on modern accordion performance technique and shared his insights into modern musical harmonic theory as conceptualized in the western world.

Davine continued to serve on the faculty of the Lamont School of Music during the 1980s and the 1990s. During this time he performed works from the classical repertoire by David Diamond. Cecil Effinger, Hans Lang and Matyas Seiber. He also premiered works for accordion by leading 20th century composers including: Normand Lockwood, Dick Boyell, and Max Di Julio. His research interests included academic studies into the Tango, as well as the compilation of an annotated bibliography of composers and their works for accordion. In recognition of his musicianship and his talent for educating students of several generations, the University of Denver awarded Davine its Distinguished Teaching Award in 1999. He was also honored by his alma mater as a recipient of Northwestern University's Distinguished Alumnus certificate in 1997.

Robert Davine's musical interests also extended beyond the university campus. During the course of his extensive career as a concert artist, Robert Davine appeared with several notable orchestral ensembles including: Denver Symphony Orchestra, Denver Chamber Orchestra, Mantovani Orchestra, Aspen Music Festival Orchestra, Da Vinci Quartet, Lake Superior Chamber Orchestra, Lamont Chamber Players, the Norwegian Broadcasting Co. and the Paganini String Quartet. He also concertized as a staff accordionist for the NBC network in Denver and the WGN network in Chicago. As a member of the faculty at the Lamont School of Music he appeared in six to eight concerts per year. Included among his compositions is a Divertimento for Flute, Clarinet, Bassoon and Accordion.

=== Death ===
Robert Davine died on November 25, 2001.

== Works ==
Included among Robert Davine's works are several transcriptions of classical music for accordion as well as the following original compositions:

- Divertimento for Flute, Clarinet, Bassoon and Accordion.

== Discography ==
Robert Davine's legacy as a recording artist includes several albums produced in Philadelphia as a member of the Montavani Orchestra in the 1950s as well as the following albums:

- Robert Davine Accordion with the Lamont String Quartet and James Carroll String Bass - Snow Records (S106, 1979)
- The Concert Accordion Artistry of Robert Davine - Crystal Records (CD 160, 1995)
- Tango!: The Spirit of Argentina- ASV/Living Era/White Line (CDWHL 2148, 2005)

== Publications ==
- Davine, Robert (1979). "The Accordion As A Chamber Instrument", Accord Magazine

== Archives ==
- The Robert Davine Classical Accordion Music and Long Play Album Collection at the University of Denver contains sheet music, scores of classical compositions for accordion and nearly fifty LP vinyl albums which were donated by Robert Davine.

== See also ==
Accordion music genres
Mantovani
Tango
