= Josef Pasternack =

Polish conductor and composer (1881–1940)

- Józef Pasternak
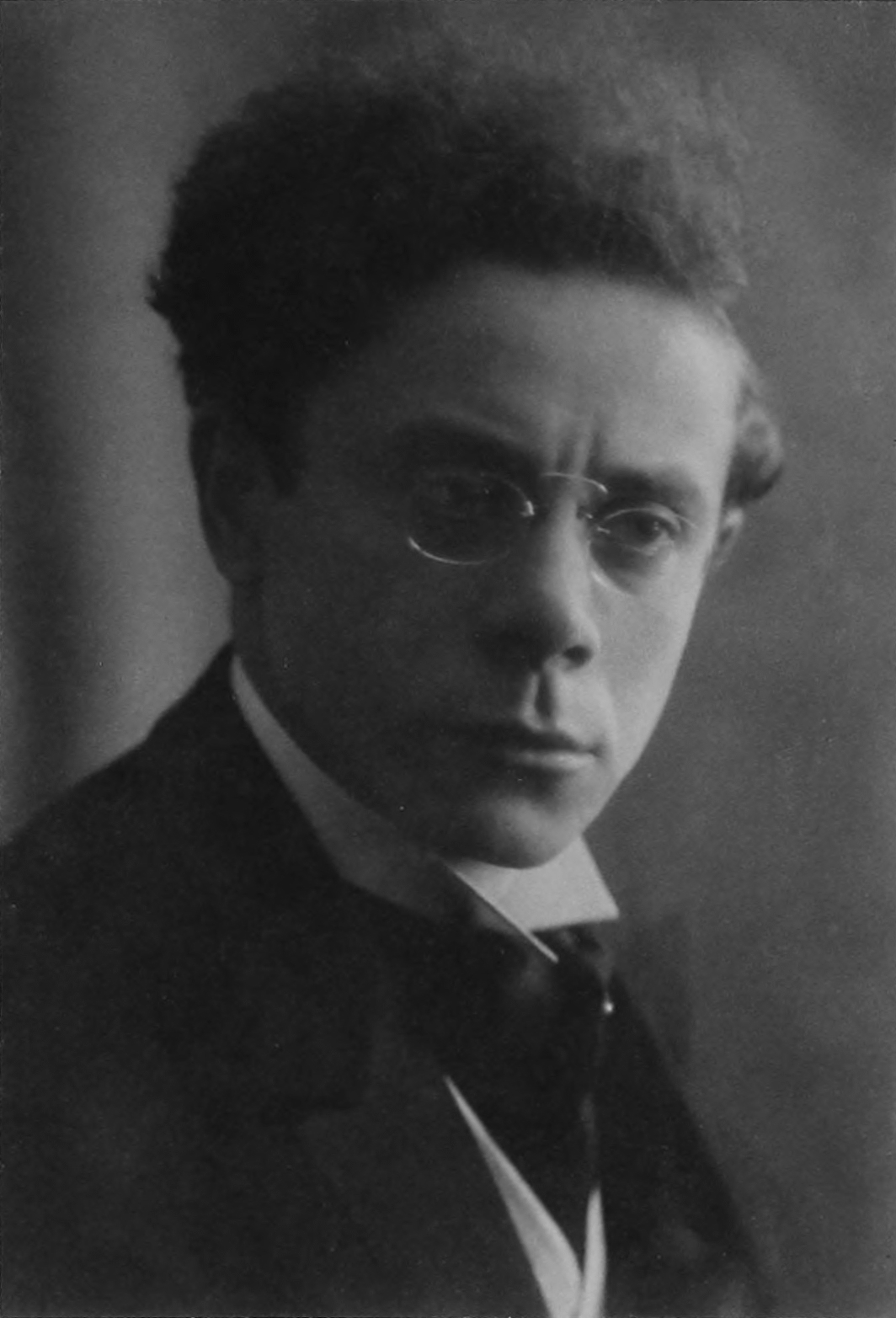
- Pasternack, c. 1910
- Born: Josef Alexander Pasternack; 7 July 1881; Częstochowa, Congress Poland, Russian Empire
- Died: 29 April 1940 (aged 58)
- Education: Warsaw Conservatory of Music
- Occupations: Musician; conductor; composer
- Years active: 1900s–1940
- Style: Classical
- Spouse: Helen Feirman (m. 1904)
- Musical career
- Instruments: Violin; viola; piano

Josef Alexander Pasternack (Polish: Józef Aleksander Pasternak; 7 July 1881 – 29 April 1940) was a Polish conductor and composer in the first half of the 20th century.

== Early life and education ==
Pasternack was born in 1881 in Częstochowa (in present-day Poland), the eldest son of Sigmund and Dora Pasternack. He had two younger brothers: Samuel and David. His father and grandfather had been bandmasters in Poland, and he began the study of the violin at age four, under his father's tutelage. At age ten, he entered the Warsaw Conservatory of Music, where he initially studied piano and composition. He also took up the study of a new instrument each month, so that by the time he left the Conservatory he could play every instrument in the orchestra except the harp.

== Career ==
At age 15, he came to the United States with his two brothers and father. Initially, he worked in a hotel restaurant as a busboy. One day, when the violinist for the hotel band did not come to work, he informed the bandleader that he was capable of filling in. He ran home, got his violin, and returned to play; afterward, the regular violinist was not allowed to return. He was able to convince the bandleader to permit his brothers to try out, and so they began their musical careers in America. Shortly thereafter, he toured the country as a concert pianist. In 1902, he was hired as a violist with the Metropolitan Opera Orchestra in New York and then became its first viola player, continuing there until 1909. His abilities came to the attention of Arturo Toscanini, who had become principal conductor at the Met in 1908, and Pasternack was made assistant conductor in 1909, a position he filled for one year.

"The Japanese Sandman"
Olive Kline performing "The Japanese Sandman" in 1920 with Pasternack conducting

In 1911, he returned to Europe as conductor of the Bremen Opera, but the Metropolitan asked for his return and he served as conductor again, in 1911–13. During 1913–26, he was conductor of the Century Opera Company in New York, the Chicago Symphony Orchestra, the Boston Symphony Orchestra, and the Philadelphia Philharmonic Society. While at the Philadelphia Philharmonic, he introduced Marian Anderson as the first African-American singer to perform there. In 1916, he became music director of the Victor Talking Machine Company (later RCA Victor) alongside Rosario Bourdon, where he again introduced Marian Anderson. He also became music director of the Stanley Company of America, owned by Warner Bros. In his role at Victor, and with several orchestras, he made recordings and conducted programs for many famous singers and instrumentalists of the day, including Enrico Caruso, Fritz Kreisler and Jascha Heifetz. From 1928 until his death in 1940, he conducted orchestras for NBC Radio, including a program with Nelson Eddy and The Carnation Contented Hour. He composed songs and music for motion pictures and radio, and wrote lyrics for "Taps".

On 29 October 1917, Pasternack recorded a version of "There's a Green Hill Out in Flanders (There's a Green Hill Up in Maine)" with the singer Albert Wiederhold, released by Victor.

== Personal life ==
Pasternack married Helen Feirman in 1904, with whom he had two daughters: Florence and Cecile.
