= The American Melody Hour =

American radio musical variety series (1941–1948)

The American Melody Hour is an American old-time radio program. The American Melody Hour was designed as a musical variety show. The program showcased a half-hour playing and singing "the tunes of yesterday and tomorrow..." mostly sung by baritone Bob Hannon.

The program was hosted by lyric soprano Vivian Della Chiesa. Other regular performers on the program included conductor Frank Black, vocalist Frank Munn and baritone Conrad Thibault. The program was produced by daytime radio monarch Frank Hummert. Announcers included Andre Baruch and Larry Elliott.

The American Melody Hour originally could be heard on the Blue Network on Wednesday nights from October 22, 1941–April 15, 1942. The program then moved to CBS Tuesdays at 7:30 pm on April 21, 1942. In 1947, the program moved to Wednesdays at 8 where it ended its run on July 7, 1948. The program was sponsored by Bayer Aspirin during its entire six-year run.

== Critical response ==
A review in the trade publication Variety compared the program to The American Album of Familiar Music and said that it sounded line 1931-era radio, demonstrating none of the "finer nuances that radio music has gathered in the past few years".
