= There's a Green Hill Out in Flanders (There's a Green Hill Up in Maine) =

1917 song by Allan J. Flynn

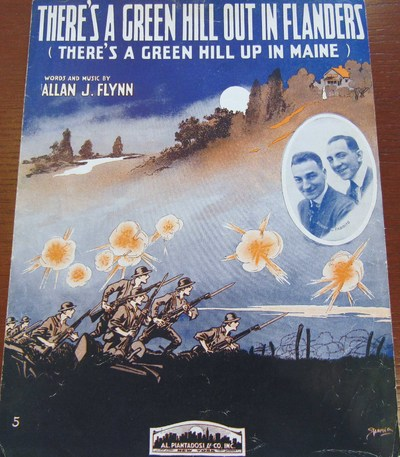
- Sheet music cover with Burns and Fabrito inset

Song
- Published: 1917, by Al Piantadosi & Co.
- Recorded: October 29, 1917
- Songwriter: Allan J. Flynn

Alternative sheet music cover
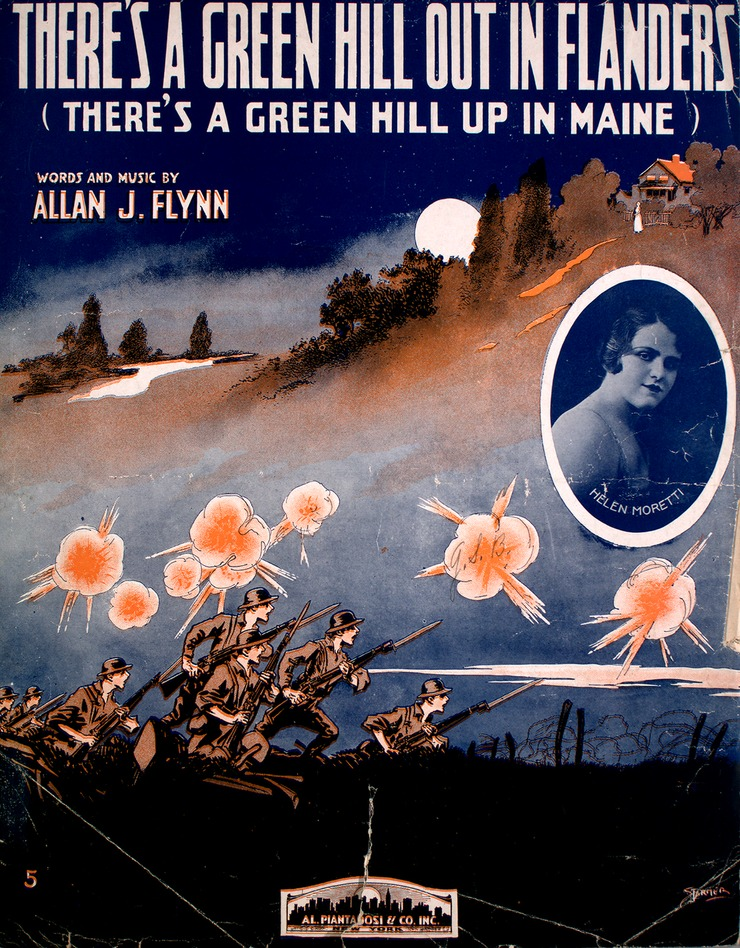
- Sheet music cover with Helen Moretti inset

"There's a Green Hill Out in Flanders (There's a Green Hill Up in Maine)" is a World War I–era song with music and lyrics by Allan J. Flynn, published by Al Piantadosi & Co. of New York City in 1917. It was written for voice and piano.

On October 29, 1917, Albert Wiederhold recorded a version of the song with conductor Josef Pasternack, released by Victor Records. It was recorded by Alan Turner the following year, also for Victor.

There are four versions of the sheet music cover. All versions feature soldiers charging a battlefield with explosions above their heads. One version features an inset photo of Burns and Fabrito, another features an inset photo of Helen Morretti, and one features an inset photo of a woman. The final version does not have an inset photo. The cover was designed by Starmer.

The sheet music can be found at the Pritzker Military Museum & Library.

The song tells the story of a mother whose only son was killed in the war. The chorus is as follows:

There's a Green hill out in Flanders
There's a Green hill up in Maine
Under one lies a son
Neath the sod and the dew
Sleeping where he fell for the Red White and Blue
On the other there's a mother
In a little cottage, waiting all in vain
So here's a tear for a brave heart in Flanders
And a cheer for a brave heart in Maine.
