= Margaret Daum =

American opera singer

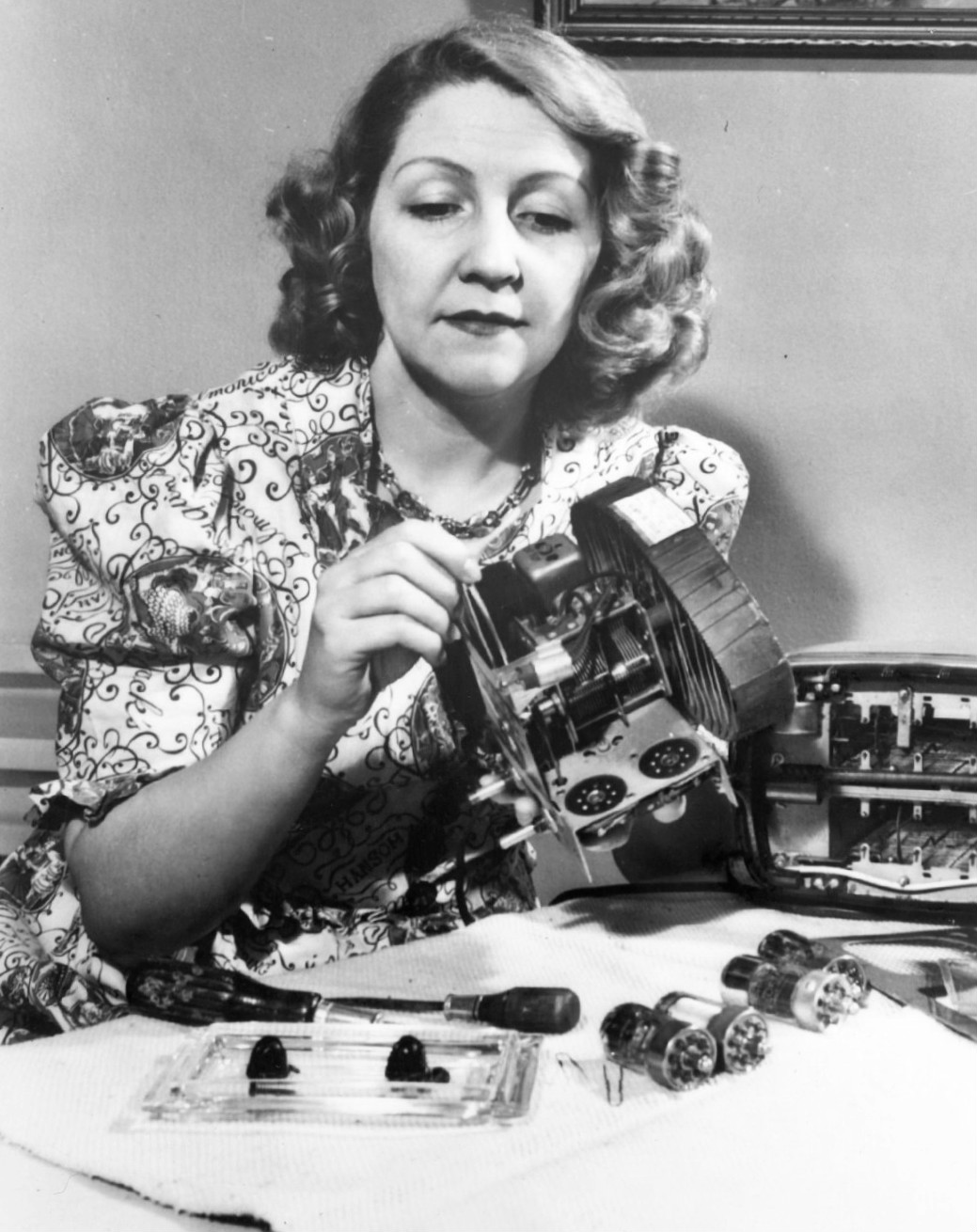
Margaret Daum

Margaret Daum (March 25, 1906 – February 23, 1977) was an American classical soprano.

Born and raised in Pittsburgh, Pennsylvania, Daum studied singing at the Ithaca Conservatory of Music where she graduated with a bachelor's degree in 1928. In 1935 she appeared in several operettas by Gilbert and Sullivan on Broadway, portraying Casilda in The Gondoliers, Edith in The Pirates of Penzance, Elsie Maynard in The Yeomen of the Guard, Josephine in H.M.S. Pinafore, the Plaintiff in Trial by Jury, and Yum-Yum in The Mikado.

She may be best-remembered for creating roles in the world premieres of two operas by Gian Carlo Menotti: the title role in Amelia Goes to the Ball (1 April 1937 at the Philadelphia Academy of Music) and Laetitia in The Old Maid and the Thief (on NBC Radio on April 22, 1939). She made her debut at the Metropolitan Opera on May 5, 1937, as Musetta in La bohème with Rosa Tentoni as Mimì, Armand Tokatyan as Rodolfo, Carlo Morelli as Marcello, and Gennaro Papi conducting. Daum also made appearances with the Chicago Opera Company during her career and was highly active as a performer on various American radio programs, such as The American Album of Familiar Music and The Bell Telephone Hour, during the 1930s through the 1950s.

== Sources ==
- Frank and Anne Hummert's radio factory: the programs and personalities of broadcasting's most prolific producers by Jim Cox
- The stages of Menotti by John Ardoin
