= Victor Pikayzen =

Soviet and Russian violinist and teacher (1933–2023)

- Born: Victor Alexandrovich Pikayzen; 15 February 1933; Kiev, USSR
- Died: 6 July 2023 (aged 90)
- Education: Moscow Conservatory
- Occupations: Violinist; Teacher

Victor Alexandrovich Pikayzen (Russian: Виктор Александрович Пикайзен; 15 February 1933 – 6 July 2023) was a Soviet Russian violinist and teacher. He was a laureate of International Competitions, Honored Artist of the RSFSR (1979), People's Artist of the RSFSR (1989), and a professor at the Moscow Conservatory.

== Biography ==
He began studying violin at the age of five, firstly under his father Alexander Pikaizen, Concertmaster of Kiev Opera.

He studied at the Music School at the Kiev Conservatory with I. A. Gutman, in 1941-1944 - in the evacuation in Alma-Ata, then - at the Moscow Secondary Special Music School. Gnesins in the class of David Oistrakh. In April 1941, at a concert in Kiev, he first heard Oistrakh play and literally “fell in love” with the musician (then Oistrakh performed Aram Khachaturian’s newly written Violin Concerto). The violinist's playing made a huge impression. “I could not imagine,” Pikaizen later recalled, “that the violin, because of which I suffer so much, can be played like that... and I decided then that I would study only with Oistrakh.

From 1951, Pikaizen continued his studies at the Moscow Conservatory in the class of Oistrakh; in 1960, he completed his postgraduate studies. He is the only student of Oistrakh who has been trained from school to the end of graduate school. While still a student at the conservatory, Pikaizen took part in two international competitions: in 1955, he received the 5th prize at the Queen Elisabeth Competition in Brussels, and in 1957, the 2nd prize at the Long Thibaud Competition in Paris. In one of the French newspapers, the well-known music critic Hélène Jourdan-Morhange then wrote: “Pikaisen... caused great admiration; his technical possibilities are endless and he is very poetic…” (“Les Lettres Francaises”, July 11, 1957). In 1965, he won 1st Prize at Paganini Competition in Genoa, 2nd and 3rd Prize were awarded to two of his compatriots, Philippe Hirschhorn and Andrei Korsakov.

Assessing the abilities and creative potential of his student, D. F. Oistrakh wrote on April 7, 1957, in the newspaper "Soviet Musician": "Viktor Pikaizen is a violinist of unlimited possibilities. He showed himself to be a brilliant virtuoso, a temperamental performer. Lately, he has worked hard on a serious artistic polishing of his craft and has made great strides.”

A year later, in 1958, Pikaizen won the second prize at the 1st International P. I. Tchaikovsky competition in Moscow. A member of the jury of the competition, a prominent Chinese musician Ma Sicong, noted the excellent technique that the young violinist demonstrated in the Paganini concerto: “The playing of this violinist is very temperamental and exciting” (Sovetskaya Kultura newspaper, April 1, 1958).

Victor Pikaizen's concert activity began in 1948 and gained great momentum. From 1957, the violinist began appearing as a soloist with the Moscow Philharmonic. He performed in many cities of the Soviet Union, in the countries of Western and Eastern Europe, Southeast Asia, and South America.

From the early 1960s, he was active in concert activities. Pikaizen was one of the few who performed the cycle of Paganini Caprices, a world record of 78 times, the last one being in 2004 in Milan, with great success. Additionally, he also performed Paganini Cycles with Bach Cycles back to back various times.

From 1966 to 1986 and from 2006 to 2016 he taught at the Moscow Conservatory, from 1993 becoming a professor at the State Conservatory in Ankara (Turkey). He also taught at the violin department at the Moscow Schnittke State Institute of Music and the Central Music School at the Moscow Conservatory, continuing and developing the traditions of the Oistrakh violin school in his students. He saw his pedagogical vocation in making students cultural musicians - to educate their taste, to instill love for their work and for their profession, and to create musicians-artists out of them. He served on the jury of various International Competitions.

Among Pikayzen's students were: K. Blezan (Poland), A. Hans (France), B. Cotmel (Czech Republic), V. Sedov, A. Vediakova, Igor Pikayzen, Yury Revich, N. Tsinman, T. Martynova.

Pikayzen died on 6 July 2023, at the age of 90.

== Awards ==
- International Competition named after Jan Kubelik (Prague), 2nd Prize (1949)
- Queen Elisabeth Competition (Brussels), 5th Prize (1955)
- Long-Thibaud Competition (Paris), 2nd Prize (1957)
- International Tchaikovsky Competition (Moscow), 2nd Prize (1958)
- Paganini Competition (Genoa), 1st Prize (1965)
- People's Artist of the RSFSR
- Order of Honour
- Honored Artist of the RSFSR
