= The Triolettes =

The Triolettes was a band that played in the Buffalo, New York area for several years in the early 1930s. The band consisted of Marjorie Sullivan, Eunice Miller and Loretta Clemens. They were a smooth singing trio who did their own arrangements. Marjorie and Loretta were staff members of AM radio station WBEN. Loretta Clemens was a staff pianist for WBEN. One of the announcers at the station heard her voice and told her that she would be a good singer. She did not believe him. However, one day while she was practicing some new songs on the piano, she was singing along to the music. The station manager had told the operator of the control room to turn on the microphone if she ever started to sing. When the station manager heard her sing, her old contract was torn up and a new contract was written that required her to sing.

== Founding and background ==
In the early 1930s The Triolettes played on local stations CFRB and WBEN (in Buffalo, New York and Toronto, Ontario, Canada). Their debut performance included the songs “Without that Man,” words and music by Walter Donaldson, published in 1932, “I Need Lovin’,” composed by Henry Creamer and Jimmy Johnson, published in 1926 by Jerome H. Remick & Co., and “Now That You’re Gone” composed by Gus Kahn and Ted Fiorito, published in 1931 by Jerome H. Remick & Co. The Triolettes harmonized, sang and played piano and banjos. They first played on a weekly radio program called The Banjo Twins, which included Jack Clemens, Loretta's brother. Jack Clemens died in 1970.

== Members ==
Loretta Clemens Tupper (Born 6 May 1906, Marblehead, Ohio - Died 17 September 1990, The Bronx, NY) was later famous for her acting career, she played the old lady in the Fruit of the Loom commercials and a character on the TV show Sesame Street called Mrs. Mae Trump. Loretta and her brother Jack Clemens played music in a band called Loretta and Jack. They recorded a number of songs including Stop, You're Breaking My Heart from the album Jazz Guitar Varieties, Black and Blue from the album Jazz Guitar Varieties and Just A Little Girl written by S. B. Fishburne.

Jack and Loretta Clemens also starred in a musical comedy radio series on NBC called The Gibson Family, which was on the radio from 1934 to 1935. Jack and Loretta Clemens played themselves in the 1937 film Vitaphone Frolics. According to On the Air: The Encyclopedia of Old-Time Radio by John Dunning, Jack and Loretta Clemens were a brother and sister Piano-patter song duo who performed on various radio programs throughout the 1930s. Loretta Clemens married violinist Frederick H. Tupper (Born 5 October 1904 - Died 31 May 1974).

Eunice Miller Obrist (Born 8 May 1910, Syracuse, New York - Died 3 July 2006, Syracuse, New York) also performed in the Syracuse, New York area with her sister, Ursula Miller Barker (Born 22 May 1913, Syracuse, New York - Died 13 November 2003, Syracuse, New York). They were in a band called The Crooning Banjo Sisters. The Crooning Banjo Sisters played on Syracuse, New York radio stations WFBL and WSYR. Eunice Miller's husband was Edward Charles Obrist Sr., (Born 13 July 1909, Syracuse, New York - Died 3 September 1987, Clay, New York). He was a Radio Announcer and Production Manager at WBEN in the 1930s and they were married in 1932.

Marjorie Sullivan Green, known as "Red" Sullivan was a Mezzo Soprano and blues singer, she had red hair and worked at WBEN, singing and answering telephones.

== Live performance dates ==
The following dates were scheduled live on-air performances for The Triolettes on WBEN and CFRB:

The Triolettes – (and Queer Quirks) Wednesday September 21, 1931 on radio station CFRB (Toronto, Ontario, Canada) - 9:00-9:30 (The Niagara Falls Gazette, Wednesday September 21, 1931 pg. 19)

The Triolettes – (and Queer Quirks) Monday June 20, 1932 on radio station CFRB (Toronto, Ontario, Canada) - 8:30-9:00 (The Niagara Falls Gazette, Monday June 20, 1932 pg. 15)

The Triolettes – (and Queer Quirks) Wednesday July 16, 1932 on radio station CFRB (Toronto, Ontario, Canada) - 8:30-9:00 (The Niagara Falls Gazette, Wednesday July 16, 1932 pg. 16)

The Triolettes – (and Queer Quirks) Wednesday August 24, 1932 on radio station CFRB (Toronto, Ontario, Canada) - 8:30-9:00 (The Niagara Falls Gazette, Wednesday August 24, 1932 pg. 15)

The Triolettes – (and Queer Quirks) Wednesday September 14, 1932 on radio station CFRB (Toronto, Ontario, Canada) - 9:00-9:30 (The Niagara Falls Gazette, Wednesday September 14, 1932 pg. 17)

The Triolettes - Saturday December 10, 1932 on radio station CFRB (Toronto, Ontario, Canada) at 8:30-8:45 (The Niagara Falls Gazette, Saturday December 10, 1932 pg. 11)

The Triolettes - Saturday December 31, 1932 on radio station CFRB (Toronto, Ontario, Canada) at 9:00-9:30 (The Niagara Falls Gazette, Saturday December 31, 1932 pg. 13)
