= The Carnation Contented Hour =

1931–1951 radio music series

- Percy Faith conducting his orchestra
- Genre: Traditional mainstream American music
- Running time: 30 minutes
- Country of origin: United States
- Language: English
- Syndicates: NBC West Coast; Blue Network; NBC; CBS
- Starring: Josephine Antoine; Reinhold Schmidt; Buddy Clark; Dinah Shore; Tony Martin; Jo Stafford; Dick Haymes
- Announcer: Vincent Pelletier; Jimmy Wallington; Holland Engle
- Written by: Albert Hansen
- Directed by: Robert Redd
- Produced by: Charles Cottington; Robert Redd
- Original release: April 26, 1931 – December 30, 1951

The Carnation Contented Hour is a long-running radio music series, sponsored by the Carnation Milk Company, which premiered April 26, 1931 on the regional NBC West Coast network. The full network series began January 4, 1932, on the Blue Network and was broadcast for two decades until its final broadcast on CBS December 30, 1951.

== Overview ==
When the program began on the NBC Pacific Coast Network, it originated from Seattle and featured a quartet and an aorchestra. It moved to Chicago when national distribution began on January 4, 1932.

With its opening theme, "Contented," the musical variety show featured Josef Pasternack conducting until he died of a heart attack during a rehearsal. Leroy Shield and other conductors played four-week tryouts until the network settled on Percy Faith and his orchestra.

Performers varied but usually included Buddy Clark, vocalist; Reinhold Schmidt, bass; and Josephine Antoine, soprano. The announcer was Vincent Pelletier. The program's producers were Harry K. Gilman and C. H. Cottington.

Until October 24, 1932, the program featured Gene Arnold and Herman Larson, broadcast over NBC Blue on Mondays at 8 p.m. Clark joined the cast on October 31, 1932.

== World War II ==
During World War II, the Armed Forces Radio Service obtained rights to rebroadcast the program to military personnel. Recordings were made on 16" electrical transcription discs for playback at 33 1/3 rpm over AFRS. Commercial messages were edited out, and the program was re-titled The Melody Hour.

== Post-war ==
On January 7, 1946, the program began originating from New York after having been based in Chicago for 14 years. The change in location was accompanied by a change in format as weekly guest performers replaced regularly scheduled singers. Faith remained with the program as conductor, composer, and arranger. Faith left the program as of January 1, 1948, because it was moved to Hollywood.

Ted Dale succeeded Faith as musical director in January 1948. Dale brought a dramatic and theatrical quality to the program with energetic, colorful arrangements. On March 26, 1950, Dick Haymes became the program's host, and Jo Stafford became its "featured feminine singier". The program had been using guest stars since the death of Clark. Tony Martin became the star of the program in October 1950.

== Schedule ==
The program was broadcast on the Blue Network on Mondays at 8 p.m. January 4, 1932 - October 24, 1932. Jay Hickerson's The Ultimate History of Network Radio Programming and Guide to all Circulating Shows indicates the program aired on NBC at 8 p.m. from October 31, 1932, moving to 10 p.m. from November 21, 1932, until September 26, 1949. He reports that 43 recorded shows are available, 36 bearing dates.

NBC announced plans for the program to be broadcast on Mondays at 10 p.m. Eastern Time beginning October 3, 1949, as part of NBC's move to present "a full-scale 'Night of Music'". Carnation Contented Hour was to be the last of five 30-minute musical programs in a block that began with The Railroad Hour at 8 p.m. E. T. Subsequently the program was moved to CBS to be broadcast on Sundays at 10 p.m. E. T. The trade publication Billboard reported that Carnation wanted to leave the 10 p.m. Monday slot to avoid the competition of My Friend Irma on CBS at that time.

== Critical response ==
A review in Billboard in 1951 described the selection of musical content as "particularly adroit, made up of a neat mixture of current pop hits, standards, show tunes, etc." The review complimented Martin's and Stafford's voices and artistry and the performance of Victor Young's orchestra.

The trade publication Variety said in a review that the program "gained new stature" when Martin and Stafford were added. The review added that combining their talents with the backing of Young's orchestra created "a solid song session". It also complimented the work of the Ken Lane Singers.

== Sources ==
- Frank Buxton, Bill Owen. The Big Broadcast, 1920–1950. ISBN 0-670-16240-X.
