= Jean Dickenson =

American singer

Jean Dickenson (December 10, 1913 – January 26, 2007) was an American soprano singer who performed on radio and on the stage. She was known as "The Nightingale of the Airways" during her thirteen years with NBC's radio show The American Album of Familiar Music.

== Early life ==
Jean Dickenson was born in Montreal, Canada on December 10, 1913. She was the daughter of mining engineer Ernest Heathcote Dickenson and novelist May Dickenson. Her father's work took him to several countries, with the family living in New York, San Francisco, the Philippines, India, Europe, and South Africa before settling in Denver, Colorado, when Dickenson was 14 years old.

She gained her primary education in New York City and her secondary education in San Francisco. There she began taking singing lessons in Denver after having previously studied piano. She graduated with honors from the University of Denver's Lamont School of Music. While Dickenson was a student at Lamont, she won a national singing contest from a group of 200 sopranos.

== Career ==
During her final year at Lamont, Dickenson was featured on the NBC radio program Golden Melodies, which originated at KOA in Denver. After that, she sang on Hollywood Hotel with Dick Powell and Frances Langford. She then went to New York CIty where she was known as "the Nightingale of the Airways" on NBC radio's The American Album of Familiar Music. She was with this show for thirteen years, performing a classical aria each Sunday night.

A protege of Lily Pons, Dickenson sang with symphonies in Denver and Milwaukee, the Little Symphony in Montreal, the Cincinnati Summer Opera, the San Carlo Opera Company, and with the Denver Grand Opera Company. On January 26, 1940, she made her Metropolitan Opera debut, portraying Philine in Mignon.

During World War II, Dickenson performed in the United States and Canada to suppor the war effort.

== Personal life ==
Dickenson married Daniel Marcy in 1942, before he went for active duty in World War II. After the war, they moved to Briarcliff Manor, New York in 1949.

She died on January 26, 2006, in Briarcliff. She was buried in Cold Spring, New York.
