= Chevrolet Musical Moments Revue =

American radio musical variety series (1935–1939)

Chevrolet Musical Moments Revue, also known as Musical Moments or the Chevrolet Show, is an electrically transcribed or recorded radio program issued by World Broadcasting System.

== Overview ==
It was a musical variety show which in 1935–36 featured David Rubinoff and Westbrook Van Voorhis (as "Hugh Conrad"), Monday through Friday for 15 minutes. A great many musicians and musical ensembles appeared on this show including Gus Haenschen/Carl Fenton and his orchestra; the Song Smiths; Casper Reardon, jazz harpist; and Metropolitan Opera soprano Josephine Antoine in 1937.

== Format ==
The program's musical numbers were supplemented with promotion of Chevrolet. Each episode contained two one-minute commercials for the manufacturer and left time for a one-minute message about local Chevrolet dealers. In addition to those local commercials, each musical selection was preceded by a statement such as "Your local Chevrolet dealer presents the music of ...".

== Distribution ==
Broadcast schedules for the show varied from station to station, with episodes scheduled "at the hour that is best suited to the listening audience in every locality". In some markets, two stations carried the program, with the schedule arranged to provide six broadcasts per week. In some situations, the show was broadcast on all stations in a given market.

In 1937, the program was broadcast on more than 400 stations, "the largest group of stations ever employed by any sponsored broadcast". The series was interrupted because of a strike at General Motors in 1937. It was on 380 stations when it went off. When it resumed in late March 1937 it was on 401 stations in 341 cities. The total of 401 was reported to be "the largest group of radio stations ever used on any sponsored program."

More than 155 recorded shows are known to exist in radio collections.
