= Loretta Clemens Tupper =

American singer and actress (1906–1990)

- Born: Loretta Nellie Clemens Tupper; May 6, 1906; Marblehead, Ohio, U.S.
- Died: September 17, 1990 (aged 84); New York City, U.S.
- Occupations: Singer; pianist; radio performer; actress
- Musical career
- Genres: Jazz
- Instrument: Vocals piano
- Labels: Victor Records, Perfect

Loretta Nellie Clemens Tupper (May 6, 1906 – September 17, 1990) was an American jazz singer, pianist, vaudevillian and radio actress, who later added television and film appearances to her impressive repertoire.

In her early career she was known as Loretta Clemens and in her later career she was known as Loretta Tupper She featured in numerous television commercials and was famous for playing the old lady in the Fruit of the Loom television commercials from the 1980s. She was a character on the PBS television show Sesame Street called Mrs. Mae Trump in the 1980s. She played small roles in numerous movies.

== Early career ==
In the early 1930s, Loretta and her brother Jack Clemens played music in a band called Loretta and Jack. They recorded a number of songs including "Stop! You're Breaking My Heart" from the album Jazz Guitar Varieties, written by Ted Koehler and Burton Lane, "(What Did I Do To Be So) Black and Blue" written by Harry Brooks and Andy Razaf and composed by Thomas "Fats" Waller, from the album Jazz Guitar Varieties and "Just A Little Girl" written by S. B. Fishburne. In the early 1930s Loretta was a member of a trio band called The Triolettes, along with Eunice Miller and Marjorie Sullivan.

== Recordings (selected) ==
Title	Artist	Company/Label Number	Speed/Size	Recording Date	With/From
Who's Afraid of the Big Bad Wolf?	Loretta Clemens Tupper	Perfect 15827-A	7 8 10-in.	09/23/1933	(Harry Reiser and his Eskimos) The Three Little Pigs (film)
Way out West	Jack and Loretta Clemens	Victor BS-07923	78 10-in.	04/23/1937	From Babes in Arms
The Lady is a Tramp	Jack and Loretta Clemens	Victor BS-07924	78 10-in.	04/23/1937	
Cat's Serenade	Loretta Clemens Tupper	Victor BS-055548	78 10-in.	08/27/1940	featuring the Xavier Cugat Waldorf-Astoria Orchestra)

== Radio Programs and Movies ==
Jack and Loretta Clemens also starred in The Gibson Family, an hour-long musical comedy radio series on NBC from 1934 to 1935. The program did not do well in the ratings, and in 1935 it was reworked and renamed Uncle Charlie's Tent Show. While the format had changed, many of the characters from The Gibson Family were in the new version of the show. Jack and Loretta Clemens remained on the show, playing the same characters that they played originally. Uncle Charlie's Tent Show was broadcast for less than three months before it too was canceled.

From 1933 through 1939 Jack and Loretta Clemens had their own program, Jack and Loretta Clemens, a brother-sister piano-patter-and-song-duo broadcast on various networks including NBC, CBS, Blue Network and Blue. The program was 15 minutes long and was broadcast up to six times per week.

Between 1934 and 1937 Loretta sang on the NBC radio program Johnny Presents. They performed in the 1936 short film Towers of Melody and managed to add a reference to the song The Big Bad Wolf recorded for Disney's The Three Little Pigs. In 1936 Jack and Loretta starred in the radio program Studio 7, which aired three times a week on NBC. They played themselves in the 1937 musical film Vitaphone Frolics.

== Personal life, later career and awards ==
Sometime during the 1930s Loretta married violinist, jazz musician, and big band arranger Fredrick H. Tupper who was born October 5, 1904, and died May 31, 1974. She studied at Western Reserve University. In 1942, she gave birth to her daughter, Rettadel Tupper, and decided to semi-retire from show business. She opened a talent school in Queens, New York, where she taught future stars, including Eileen Brennan. In 1969 the father of one of her students took some photos of her and sent them to some agents in New York. Shortly after that, Mrs. Tupper had her first new acting role advertising Parker Pens. After the death of her husband, she returned to show business, and appeared in numerous television commercials and small film roles. Directors nicknamed her One-Take Tupper for her ability to complete her part in just one take. In 1977 she won a Clio Award for her first Fruit of the Loom commercial. She was in numerous commercials including Hertz, The New York Yankees, Midas Mufflers, Audi and Morton's Doughnuts. In 1985 she won another Clio award for her work in a commercial for the Baltimore Orioles. She worked steadily until the last two years of her life.

In 1985, she had a small role as a music shop owner in Woody Allen's film The Purple Rose of Cairo.
