= Virginia Rea =

American opera singer

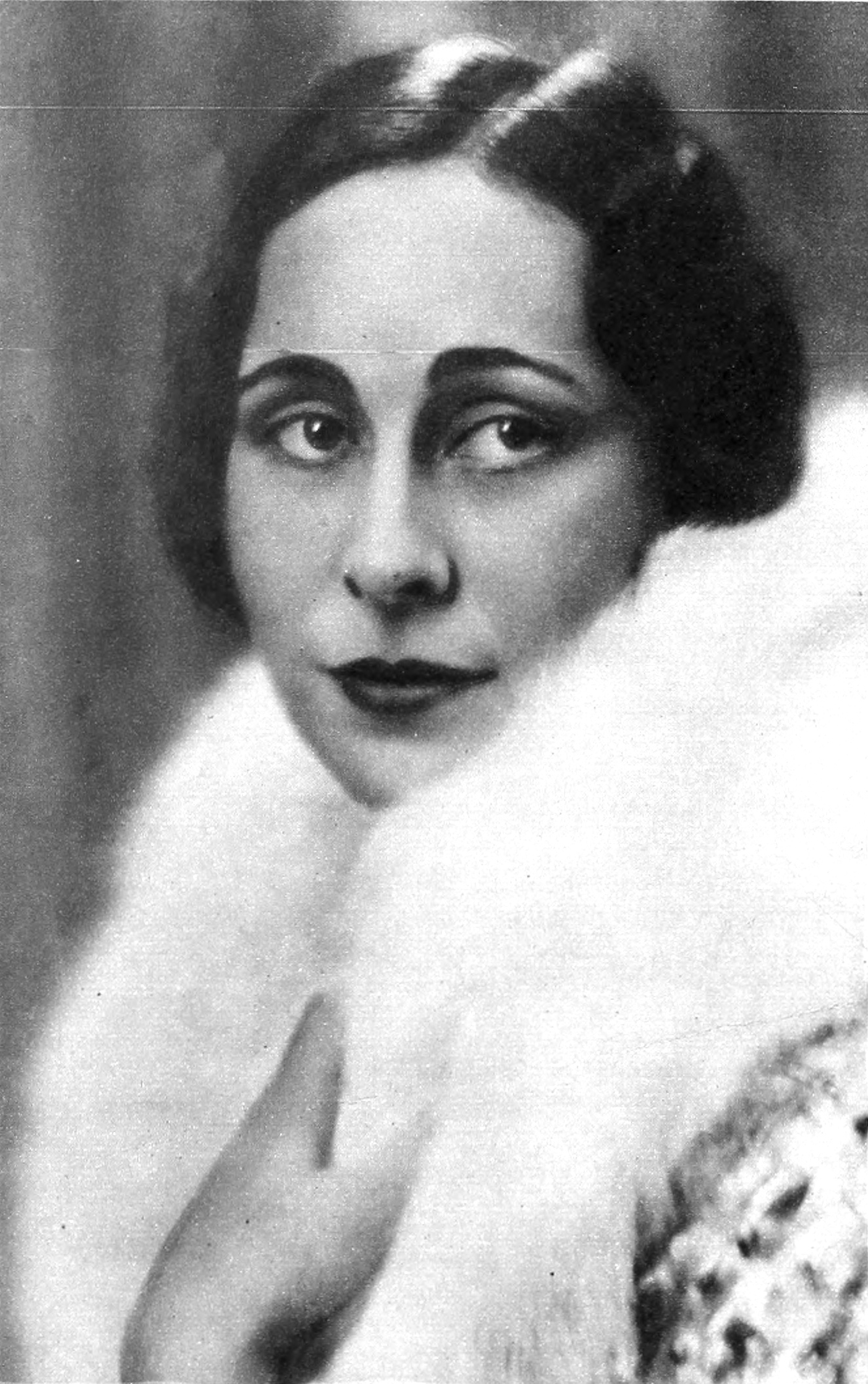

Virginia Rea (born Virginia Earle Murphy) (March 28, 1897 – July 1941) was an American coloratura soprano. She was billed as Olive Palmer when she appeared on The Palmolive Hour on radio.

== Early years ==
Rea was born in March 1897 in Louisville, Kentucky, the daughter of wholesale businessman J.R. Murphy and his wife, Kitty Rea. The family moved to Des Moines, Iowa, when Rea was 12 or 13, and she began taking music lessons at Drake University's conservatory and singing solos at the University Church of Christ. She also studied in France.

== Career ==
Rea gained her first professional role via a telephone call. After learning about a plan to produce 20 opera revivals in New York, she called the producer, who told her that no roles were available. She offered, however, to sing for him over the phone; when she had finished, he told her to take the first available train to New York. Still singing as Virginia Murphy, she performed in operas and had a national concert tour. Soon after those accomplishments, she began to use her mother's family name and became Virginia Rea.

=== Stage ===
In the summer of 1921, Rea sang with an Italian opera company in Boston. In October 1923, she performed in her first New York recital.

=== Radio ===
Rea began singing on radio in 1925. From 1927 to 1931, she co-starred with Frank Munn on The Palmolive Hour, but they were billed as Olive Palmer and Paul Oliver as part of "a strategy that upheld the doctrines of indirect advertising". Within the program's first two years on the air, she became one of the 10 best-known radio personalities. After that show went off the air, she and Munn sang on The American Album of Familiar Music. She also was featured soloist on the Goodyear Program in 1932. In 1935, she was one of the featured singers on Musical Moments, headed by violinist David Rubinoff.

=== Recording ===
Rea recorded for the Brunswick, Columbia, Edison, and Victor labels, with most of her work for Brunswick.

== Personal life ==
Rea was first married to Bertram Bailey [1918-1921]. Rea later married cellist Edgar H. Sittig [m 1936].
Rea died rather suddenly in July 1941 of a heart attack.
