= The Gibson Family =

1934–35 US radio program

- Other names: Uncle Charlie's Tent Show (beginning on June 30, 1935)
- Genre: Musical comedy
- Country of origin: United States
- Language(s): English
- Syndicates: NBC
- Hosted by: Charles Winninger (for Uncle Charlie's Tent Show)
- Starring: Adele Ronson; Jack Clemens; Warren Hull; Loretta Clemens; Conrad Thibault; Lois Bennett
- Announcer: Jimmy Wallington
- Written by: Owen Davis; Howard Dietz; Arthur Schwartz; Courtney Ryley Cooper; Tom McKnight; Mort Lewis
- Directed by: Carlo De Angelo; Ken Christie (Uncle Charlie's Tent Show)
- Original release: September 15, 1934 – September 8, 1935
- Sponsored by: Procter & Gamble

The Gibson Family is an American old-time radio program – the first original musical comedy on radio. It was broadcast on NBC from September 15, 1934, until June 23, 1935, when the format was revamped and the title was changed to Uncle Charlie's Tent Show, which ran from June 30, 1935, until September 8, 1935.

== Format ==
The Gibson Family might be considered a musical soap opera. It focused on day-to-day activities of the title household and incorporated music composed specifically for the program. A preview of the show published in The Bismarck Tribune on the day of its premiere noted, "The story of the Gibson Family will be continuous but each episode will be complete in itself." The main characters were Bob and Dot Gibson, Sally (their daughter), and a butler named Awful.

Radio historian John Dunning wrote in On the Air: The Encyclopedia of Old-Time Radio that despite a $500,000 investment by sponsor Procter & Gamble and a "top music-and-lyrics team from Broadway ... some 'vital spark' was missing. The audience left early, its numbers fading with each week." Eventually, the format was revamped, and the title was changed to Uncle Charlie's Tent Show. The transition began on June 9, 1935, when Charles Winninger joined the cast of The Gibson Family in the role of Uncle Charlie, who took charge of "guiding the cast on a tour of cities in his tent show."

=== Uncle Charlie's Tent Show ===
On June 30, Uncle Charlie's Tent Show officially replaced The Gibson Family on the air. The program incorporated some of the actors from its predecessor, while others were dropped. Winninger took on the role of a carnival barker attracting would-be customers into his tent, crying "Hurry-hurry-hurry, just-a warmin' up, folks" and then describing some of the attractions supposedly offered inside.

== Personnel ==
=== The Gibson Family ===
Characters and the actors who portrayed them in speaking parts are shown in the table below. In musical numbers, Jack and Loretta Clemens stayed in character, while Conrad Thibault sang the part of Jack Hamilton, and Lois Bennett sang the part of Sally Gibson.

Character	Actor
Sally Gibson	Adele Ronson
Bobby Gibson	Jack Clemens
Jack Hamilton	Warren Hull
Dotty Marsh	Loretta Clemens
Pa Gibson	Jack Roseleigh
Ma Gibson	Anne Elstner
Awful, the butler	Ernie "Bubbles" Whitman

Source: On the Air, The Encyclopedia of Old-Time Radio

Owen Davis and Courtney Ryley Cooper wrote the scripts for the show. Howard Dietz wrote lyrics for the program's songs, and Arthur Schwartz wrote the music for them. In 1950, the trade publication Billboard reported that Dietz and Schwartz wrote approximately 90 songs for the program's 39 episodes. Several of the songs were used in the duo's Broadway musical, Revenge with Music (1934).

Jimmy Wallington was the announcer, Don Voorhees led the orchestra, and Carlo De Angelo was the director.

=== Uncle Charlie's Tent Show ===
Much of the cast continued from The Gibson Family, but some changes occurred. Anne Teeman took the spoken role of Sally Gibson, while Bennett continued that character's singing part. The character of Jack Hamilton disappeared, but Thibault remained to perform romantic ballads. Eddie Green was added as a comedic complement to Whitman's character. A vocal quartet, the Ivory City Four, directed by Ken Christie, was added; its members were Bob Moody, Lou Stokes, Scrappy Lambert, and Randolph Weyant. Tom McKnight and Mort Lewis came on board as new writers.
