= Igor Pikayzen =

Russian-American violinist

Igor Pikayzen (Russian: Игорь Леонидович Пикайзен; born November 16, 1987) is a Russian-American violinist.

== Early life ==
Pikayzen was born in Moscow, Russia to a highly musical family. He began his violin lessons at the age of 5 with his grandfather Victor Pikayzen. At the age of 8 he gave his first concert Mozart's Concerto No. 2 and by the age of 12 he began appearing with Moscow Radio Symphony, Ankara Philharmonic and Moscow Chamber Orchestra. In 1999 he relocated to the United States and began studying at the Manhattan School of Music with Keng-Yuen Tseng, receiving a BM from the Juilliard School and an MM and AD from the Yale School of Music.

Since 2012 he has appeared as a soloist with major orchestras across Europe, Asia, North and South America in Carnegie Hall, Tchaikovsky Hall, Flagey, Alice Tully Hall, Cadogan Hall, Taipei Concert Hall, President Hall, Tbilisi Opera Hall, Newman Arts Center, Toronto Arts Center, Sala Felipe Villanueva, National Palace of Arts in Mexico City, Teatro San Cugat in Barcelona, Teatro de Llago en Frutillar, Teatro Carlo Felice, Sendai Concert Hall in Japan, Minor Hall of Moscow Conservatory. Appearing as a soloist with the national symphonic orchestras of Russia, Japan, Canada, Taiwan, Turkey, Mexico, Poland, Italy, Romania, Mexico, Chile, Georgia, and the US, he has performed under the batons of such conductors as Jorge Mester, Łukasz Borowicz, Brett Mitchell, Lior Shambadal, Toshiyuki Shimada, Emil Tabakov, Hobart Earle, Gürer Aykal, Thomas Rösner, Jerzy Salwarowski, Nurhan Arman, Daniel Huppert, Jose-Luis Dominguez and countless others. His debut recording for Warner Music Korea with the London Philharmonic Orchestra comes out in 2023 and will feature the Glazunov violin concerto, as well as the original version of the Waltz-Scherzo by Tchaikovsky.

Igor Pikayzen has recorded works of Paganini, Ysaÿe, Tchaikovsky, Marteau, Debussy, Brahms, Elliott Carter, Saint-Saëns for Naxos, Pentatone, ProMusica, Orchid Classics and Warner Music. He is a frequent guest at festivals around the world He is currently Professor of Violin at the Lamont School of Music at the University of Denver in addition to being the Artistic Director of Festival Edelio in Westport, CT.

== Awards ==
- 2008 — International Competition for Violin Kloster Schöntal, Schöntal Germany — 2nd Prize
- 2009 — Tadeusz Wronski International Competition, Warsaw Poland — 1st Prize
- 2013 — Henryk Szeryng International Violin Competition, Mexico City, Mexico — 2nd Prize
- 2015 — Luis Sigall International Violin Competition "Vina del Mar", Santiago, Chile — 1st prize
