= Lewis James =

Lewis Lyman James
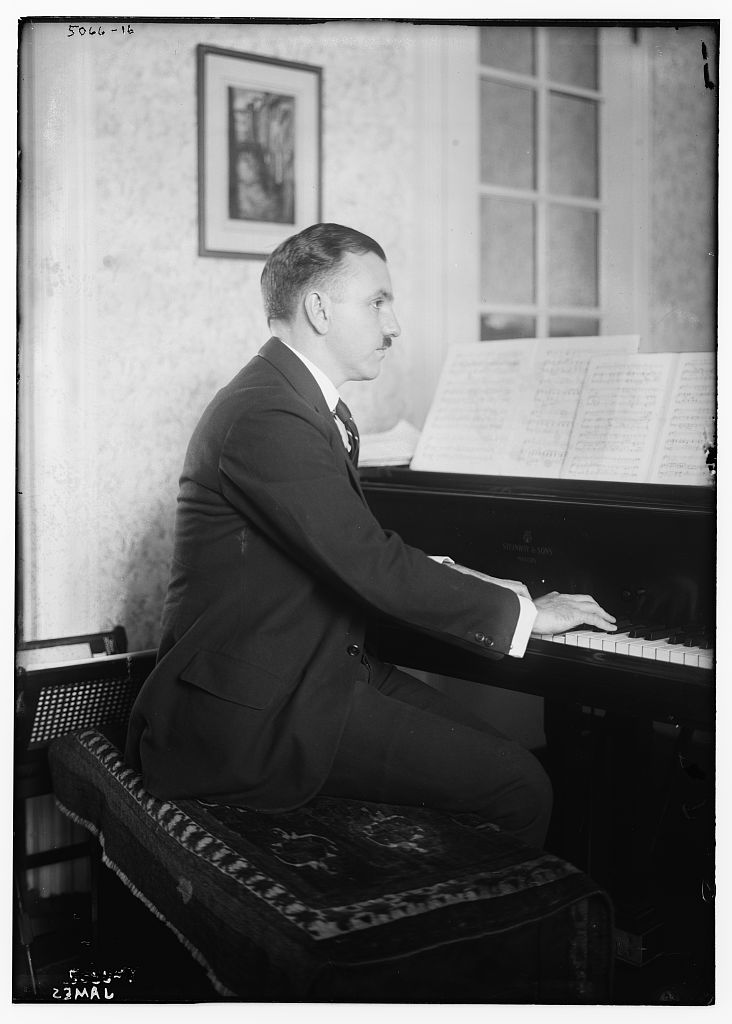
- James in 1919

Background information
- Born: July 27, 1892; Scio, Michigan, U.S.
- Died: February 19, 1959 (aged 66) Chicago, Illinois, U.S.
- Genres: Close harmony
- Occupation: Singer
- Instrument: Voice (tenor)
- Years active: 1917 – 1930s

Lewis Lyman James (July 27, 1892 – February 19, 1959) was a vocalist and among the most active of recording artists in the United States from 1917 through much of the 1930s. He was a member of The Shannon Four, The Revelers, and The Criterion Trio. He had many Top Ten hits during that time, including "My Baby Boy", "Till We Meet Again", "What'll I Do", "All Alone)" and "Pal of My Cradle Days", among others.

1923 sound recording of Lewis performing Who's Sorry Now?

== Biography ==
He was born in Scio, Michigan, on July 27, 1892.

He recorded extensively as a soloist, duet partner, and quartet lead singer. His first recording with the Shannon Four (aka the Shannon Quartet) was the World War I chestnut, "All Aboard For Home Sweet Home." Like many of his colleagues, he proved exceedingly versatile in recording love ballads, hymns, children's songs, and the more sophisticated early jazz harmonies of the Revelers with whom he made several successful European tours. The Shannon Four, Revelers, Crescent Trio, and Merrymakers consisted mostly of the same singers, with occasional substitutes. His sweet melodic tenor is immortalized on Victor, Columbia, and Edison recordings, mostly from 1917 through 1927.

He died on February 19, 1959, in Chicago, Illinois.
