= The Voice of Firestone =

American classical music show (1928–1957)

- Other names: The Firestone Hour
- Genre: Classical music
- Running time: 30 minutes
- Country of origin: United States
- Language: English
- Syndicates: NBC Blue
- TV adaptations: The Voice of Firestone
- Announcer: Hugh James
- Original release: December 3, 1928 – June 10, 1957
- Opening theme: "In My Garden" (1936–1941) "If I Could Tell You" (1941–1957)
- Ending theme: "In My Garden"
- Sponsored by: Firestone Tire and Rubber Company

The Voice of Firestone is a radio and television program of classical music. The show featured leading singers in selections from opera and operetta. Originally titled The Firestone Hour, it was first broadcast on the NBC Radio network on December 3, 1928 and was later also shown on television starting in 1949. The program was last broadcast in 1963.

== Radio ==
The program was sponsored by the Firestone Tire and Rubber Company and aired on the "Blue Network" of NBC Radio on Monday nights at 8:30 p.m. Eastern Standard Time from its 1928 inception. In 1948, The Voice of Firestone was the first commercial radio program to be carried simultaneously on both AM and FM radio stations. Firestone's 25th anniversary program was broadcast November 30, 1953, and it continued to be heard on radio until 1957. (Note: John Dunning's reference book, On the Air: The Encyclopedia of Old-Time Radio, gives the date of the final radio broadcast as June 10, 1957.)

Regular performers on the series included James Melton, Eleanor Steber, Richard Crooks, Rise Stevens, Robert Merrill, Thomas Heyward, Igor Gorin, Nadine Conner, Dorothy Warenskjold, and Thomas L. Thomas, among many others. Hugh James was the announcer.

NBC dropped the program after the June 7, 1954, broadcast, but ABC immediately began to air it beginning with the following week's installment.

== Television ==
Firestone sponsored a related television series, The Voice of Firestone Televues, one of the first television series with programming other than news or sports coverage, and according to researchers of television history, may have been the first regularly scheduled series in U.S. television history broadcast beyond New York on a network of multiple stations. It began on November 29, 1943, on New York's WNBT, when there were only a few thousand sets in existence. First seen on the rudimentary NBC television network in April 1944 (New York, Schenectady and Philadelphia), it continued until January 1947 with special interest topics in a documentary film format. The Voice of Firestone radio-TV programs were known not only for classical music, but for their support of organizations such as 4-H and the United Nations.

When The Voice of Firestone arrived on television in the fall of 1949, NBC simulcast the show on radio and TV, one of the first programs to use that technology. Thanks to the appearance on the show of famous classical-music soloists, some from the New York Metropolitan Opera, along with Broadway musical stars, the show was considered quite prestigious, but the ratings always remained low. In an era when successful programs were capable of garnering as many as half the viewers available in a given time slot, The Voice of Firestone typically only had three million viewers, a comparatively small number for what was rapidly becoming the nation's most influential mass medium. In 1954, NBC asked Firestone's permission to move the program to a different night or time period. Firestone refused and NBC canceled the program which then moved to ABC.

The program continued to air at 8:30 on Mondays until 1959, when ABC insisted on moving the show to a later time period. Firestone refused, and the show was canceled entirely. Although the ratings were low at the time of its cancellation, the fan outcry was loud, with some writing their congressmen. ABC tried to appease the fans with Music for a Summer Night, a copy of the show minus Firestone, but the results were not favorable. The 30th anniversary show was telecast November 24, 1958.

In 1962, The Voice of Firestone returned, airing at 10pm on Sunday nights. The same relatively small number of viewers tuned in, and the show was permanently canceled in May 1963.

The Firestone Orchestra was conducted by Hugo Mariani (1928–31), William Daly (1931–36), Alfred Wallenstein (1936–43) and Howard Barlow (1943 on). Featured among the eight regular singers of the Firestone Chorus were Lorraine Donahue, William Toole (baritone), Russell Hammar (tenor), Donald Craig (bass), and Bill Metcalf. Hugh James was the announcer.

== Cast ==
- Howard Barlow as Conductor
- Mary Costa as Marguerite
- Harry John Brown as Conductor

== Theme songs ==
Idabelle Firestone (Mrs. Harvey S. Firestone) was the composer and lyricist of the program's opening and closing theme songs. She wrote "In My Garden" in 1933 which became the Firestone Hour's opening theme until 1940. In that year "In My Garden" was banned from use by ASCAP due to a composers' dispute. Mrs. Firestone then introduced the popular "If I Could Tell You" which became the show's opening theme song for all its remaining years. "In My Garden" became the closing theme later when the dispute was resolved. Tenor Richard Crooks, the longtime host of the radio broadcasts (from 1928 to 1945), recorded "If I Could Tell You" for RCA Victor. Soprano Eleanor Steber, a frequent Firestone host following Crooks, also recorded both of Idabelle Firestone's songs.

== New England Conservatory holdings ==
The New England Conservatory houses documents and recordings related to The Voice of Firestone.
