= Richard Crooks =

American opera singer

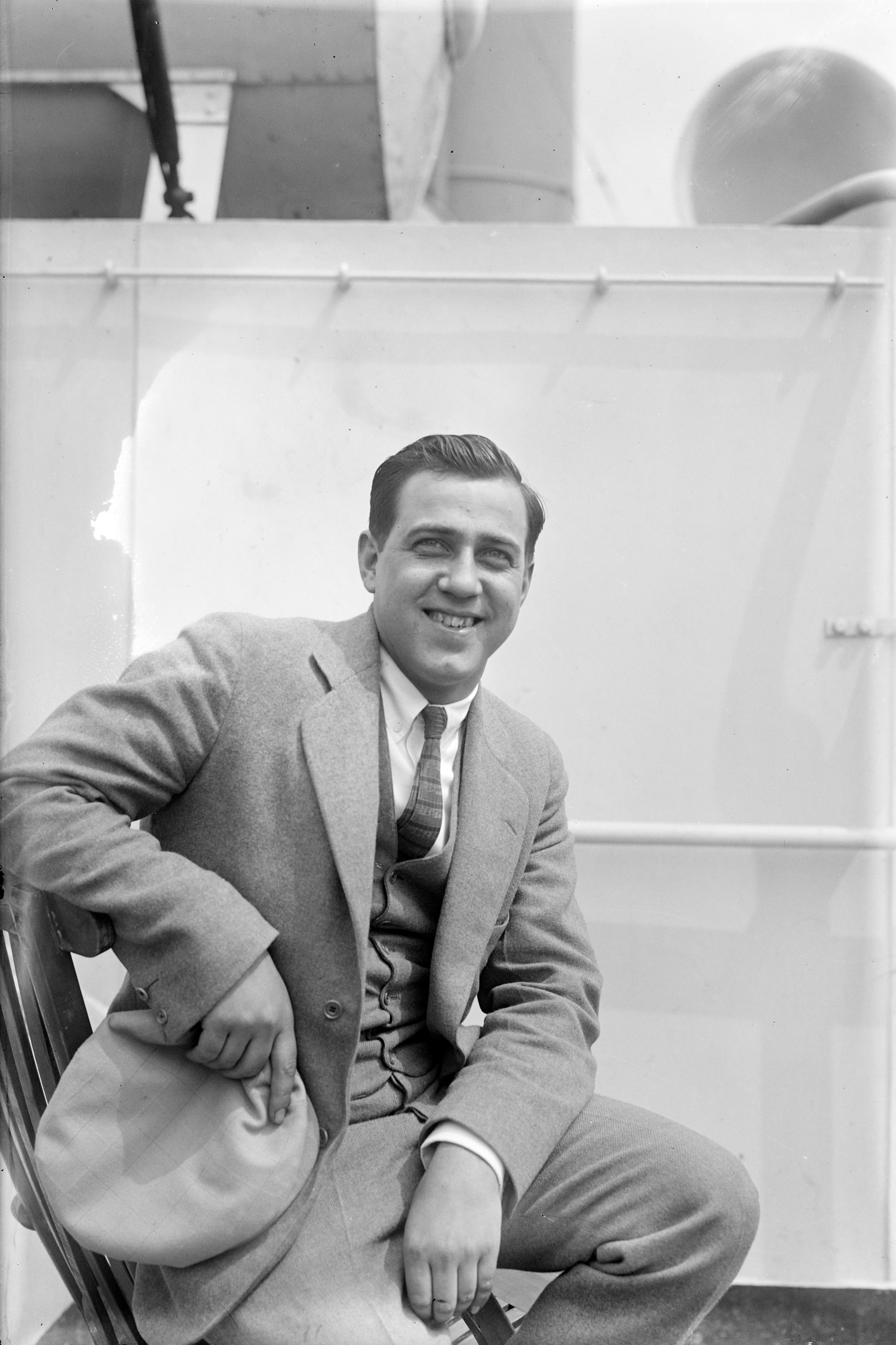
The young Crooks

Richard Alexander Crooks (June 26, 1900 – September 29, 1972) was an American tenor and a leading singer at the New York Metropolitan Opera.

== Biography ==
Crooks was born the second son of Alexander and Elizabeth Crooks on June 26, 1900, in Trenton, New Jersey, and attended Trenton Central High School. Following several concert seasons as an oratorio and song recital specialist, including the American première of Mahler's Das Lied von der Erde, he traveled to Germany where he made his operatic debut in Hamburg as Cavaradossi in Puccini's Tosca in 1927. In Germany he studied singing with Sidney Dietch.

After his tour in other European cities such as Berlin, Crooks returned to the US and made his American debut in 1930 in Philadelphia. He became a star of the Metropolitan Opera, specializing in French and Italian operas. He participated in the farewell gala on March 29, 1936, for Spanish soprano Lucrezia Bori, which was broadcast nationally and preserved on transcription discs.

From 1928 to 1945, Crooks was the host of "The Voice of Firestone" radio broadcasts, in which he sang operatic arias, patriotic songs, folk songs, and popular hits such as "People Will Say We're in Love" from Rodgers and Hammerstein's Oklahoma! in 1943. He also appeared on radio broadcasts with Bing Crosby, who remained a friend until Crooks's death.

Health problems forced Crooks to retire in early 1945. He continued to sing, however, at his church and elsewhere. Some of his performances were taped. He had married his childhood sweetheart and spent his later years in Portola Valley, California. An entire room in his house was devoted to framed, autographed photographs of singers, conductors, and U.S. presidents he had known. In conversations, he often praised two of the other great tenors he had heard in person: Enrico Caruso and Jussi Björling.

The Crooks family now resides in South Carolina.

== Recordings ==
Aside from an unreleased disc for Columbia, Crooks recorded primarily for the Victor Talking Machine Company/RCA Victor. His first recordings date from the mid-1920s and were devoted mainly to operetta, especially ensemble medley recordings made by the Victor Light Opera Company, the in house singing group for Victor Records. Among these early electric recordings was a medley of The Student Prince by Sigmund Romberg, in which Crooks and Lambert Murphy alternated on the "Serenade." Most of Crooks' early recordings were issued on the popular Victor black label, rather than the classical and operatic Red Seal label. Crooks also made some records for Victor's German affiliate, Electrola, during the late 1920s.

In the late 1920s, Crooks was promoted to Victor's prestigious Red Seal label. He often said that his personal favorite was a 1928 recording of two arias by Richard Wagner: "In fernem Land" from Lohengrin and the "Prize Song" from Die Meistersinger von Nürnberg. Crooks recorded a complete version of Schubert's Die schöne Müllerin in c.1934 (one of the early attempts to do so) with his teacher Frank LaForge at the piano, of which only numbers 1-3, 7-8, and 13-19 of the 20 songs were issued, and that not until 1941: the complete recording with the missing titles was issued on CD in 1997. Crooks also enjoyed making an album of Stephen Foster songs, which used authentic arrangements to recapture a vanished era of American music. In early 1942, he released a recording of César Franck's "Panis angelicus" in the original Latin; the recording has been included in Nimbus Records' Prima Voce Christmas compilation The Spirit of Christmas Past. Among his last commercial recordings, made in January 1945, was a patriotic song called The Americans Come, which he had actually recorded as a teenager for Columbia.

The Metropolitan Opera has issued a number of recorded performances featuring Crooks on LP and CD. One of his most memorable radio broadcasts was a 1940 Met performance of Gounod's Faust with Crooks in the title role; Helen Jepson sang Marguerite and Ezio Pinza sang Méphistophélès. Naxos Records issued the performance on CD, conducted by Wilfrid Pelletier, as taken from the original NBC master transcriptions.

His final private recordings were made in 1967 and 1968. The recordings of Jesu, Joy of Man's Desiring (J. S. Bach) and For You With Love (Elinor Remick Warren) were made at a wedding in Southern California on April 8, 1967. The notes for the Delos CD erroneously state that these were Richard Crooks last recordings. Actually, on November 15, 1968, Crooks sang in a performance with the Portola Valley United Presbyterian Church Choir at the Sequoias in Redwood City. On the recording, he sings "Panis angelicus" (in English) and Seek Ye The Lord.

Throughout the LP era, RCA Victor issued several albums highlighting many of Crooks's operatic arias and songs from the 1920s and 1930s, as well as a popular recording of Stainer’s The Crucifixion, recorded in 1929, which featured Crooks, Lawrence Tibbett, the Trinity Choir, and Mark Andrews at the organ. Delos has released a two-CD set of Crooks recordings, produced in cooperation with the Stanford Archives of Recorded Sound, including some performances that were never issued commercially and the 1967 recordings. There have been additional CDs released by ASV and Jewel, which show the great diversity of Crooks's recordings, including selections from operettas and popular songs.

== Death ==
He was diagnosed with cancer in the mid-1960s and battled the disease until his death. He died on September 29, 1972, in Portola Valley, California, aged 72.

== Legacy ==
For his work in recording, Crooks was awarded a star on the Hollywood Walk of Fame; located at 1648 Vine St. The Los Angeles Times, which has documented and photographed every star on the Walk as part of its ongoing Hollywood Star Walk project, has been unable to find Crooks' star (or the one for the film career of Geraldine Farrar). It is unknown if Crooks' star has been removed, or was never installed in the first place, or was simply overlooked by the Times crew.

== Sources ==
- Delos CD and liner notes
- RCA Victrola LP and liner notes
- Interviews with Crooks, 1967–72
