= Palmolive Beauty Box Theater =

American radio musical series (1934–1937)

Palmolive Beauty Box Theater was an American radio program that featured an operetta or other musical each week from April 24, 1934, to October 6, 1937. It was sponsored by Palmolive soap and produced by Bill Bacher.

Nathaniel Shilkret directed the orchestra through July 1935, for a total of 70 broadcasts. Announcer Tiny Ruffner introduced "the Palmolive Players, with John Barclay as director and leading man." In addition, there were well known guest stars, with Gladys Swarthout appearing frequently.

== Productions ==
Productions included The Chocolate Soldier, Carmen, The Mikado, and Hit the Deck. A complete list of performances through July 1935 is in the archival edition of the Shilkret autobiography. Dunning wrote that the initial run "was a huge success, drawing an estimated 25 million people in its first year and tapering off sharply thereafter." A picture of Shilkret on page 12 of the November 1934 Radio Stars has the caption, "Nathaniel Shilkret, orchestra director of the Palmolive Beauty Box Theatre, the program that ranks first"; and this was the only program the magazine rated as five stars. As of April 1935, Radio Stars ranked the Palmolive Beauty Box as third and rated it four stars. Five broadcasts are in the Shilkret archives, and Hickerson reports that the Christmas 1934 broadcast is also extant.

Shilkret ended 20 years as a RCA Victor musician and executive in New York in mid-1935 to become a musical director and head of the music department at RKO Radio Pictures in Hollywood, thus ending his affiliation with the Palmolive Beauty Box program.

== 1937 finale ==
Al Goodman was the musical director for Palmolive Beauty Box’s remaining two years. The format remained the same, except that in 1937 the length of the show was cut from 60 to 38 minutes, seriously eroding its quality. In 1937, the show switched from NBC Radio to CBS Radio. Jessica Dragonette starred on the show in 1937. Her agreement to appear on the Palmolive program ended her seven-year stint as star of the Cities Service Concerts on NBC and adversely affected her career as a radio star.

== See also ==
- The Palmolive Hour (1927-1931)
