= The Revelers =

American jazz quintet

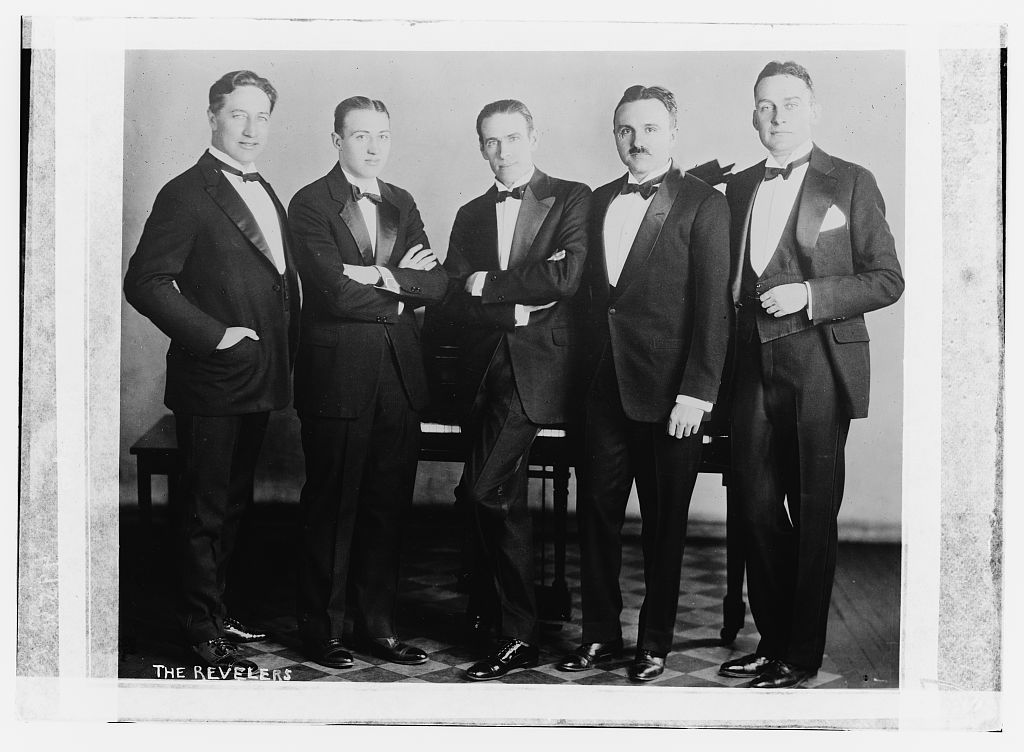
The Revelers in 1925 (l-r): Ed Smalle, Franklyn Baur, Elliot Shaw, Lewis James, Wilfred Glenn

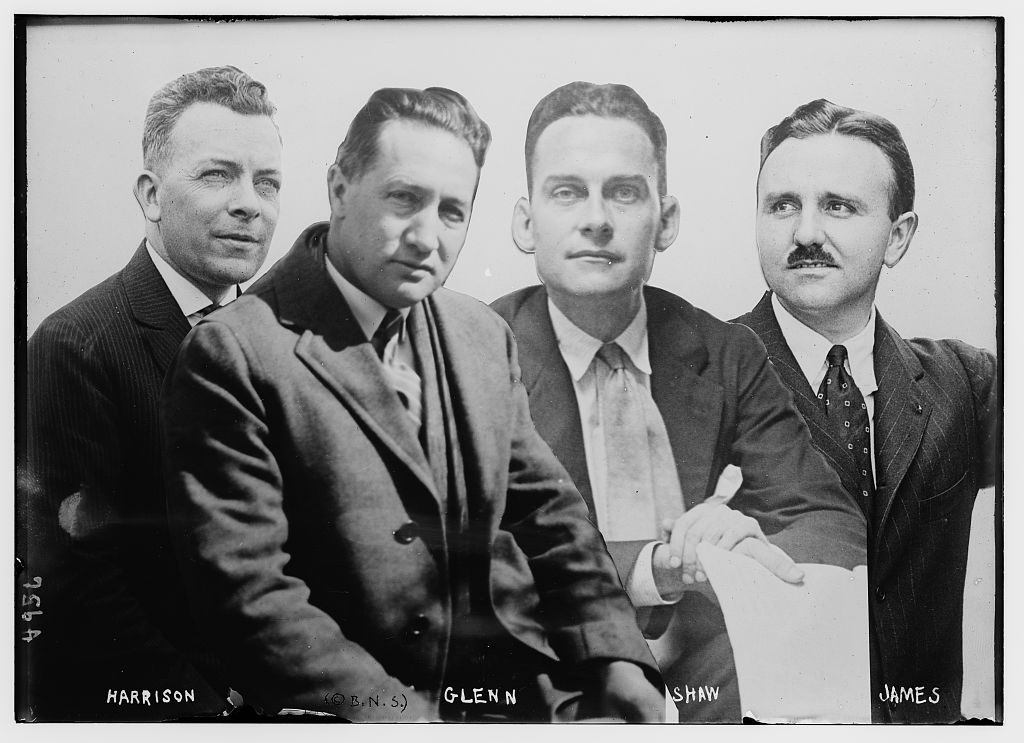
The Shannon Four in 1918

The Revelers were an American quintet (four close harmony singers and a pianist) popular in the late 1920s and early 1930s. The Revelers' recordings of "Dinah", "Old Man River", "Valencia", "Baby Face", "Blue Room", "The Birth of the Blues", "When Yuba Plays the Rhumba on the Tuba", and many more, became popular in the United States and then Europe in the late 1920s. They also produced the first known recording of "I've Been Working on the Railroad" in 1923. In August 1929, they appeared in the Netherlands with Richard Tauber at the Kurhaus, Scheveningen and the Concertgebouw, Amsterdam.

All of the members had recorded individually or in various combinations. The quartet, organized in 1917, performed under the name The Shannon Four or The Shannon Quartet before changing their name to The Revelers in 1925. The original Revelers were tenors Franklyn Baur and Lewis James (and occasionally Charles W. Harrison substituting when Baur or James was unavailable), baritone Elliot Shaw, bass Wilfred Glenn (who had popularized "Asleep in the Deep" on phonograph records), and pianist Ed Smalle. Smalle was replaced by Frank Black in 1926.

== Early films ==
The Revelers (with Black at the piano) appeared in three pioneer movie musicals, filmed by Vitaphone in 1927. Only the first one is available for viewing today: The Revelers (1927), recently restored by The Vitaphone Project, is a one-reel short showing the group performing "Mine," "Dinah," and "No Foolin'." Due to the limitations of the primitive sound production, the group was forced to perform the entire nine-minute set in one continuous, uninterrupted take, with the camera in a fixed position. The second short, filmed the same day and also titled The Revelers, awaits restoration. It features another three songs: "I'm in Love Again", "De Gaspel Train", and "Nola". The third Vitaphone reel, yet again titled The Revelers, was held back from release until October 1928. The short features "Sing", "Just Around the Corner", and "Oh! Miss Hannah".

Franklyn Baur had already left The Revelers to pursue a solo career when the last of the group's Vitaphone shorts was released. Abel Green of Variety reviewed the film and gave Baur a glowing notice: "Baur, by the manner of direction and incidental expression, aside from his vocal prowess, is a corking talking-screen bet. The tenor last season was in a Broadway musical [Ziegfeld Follies of 1927 with Eddie Cantor starring] and now impresses anew for the screen. He is of the Conrad Nagel-Wally Reid personality class."

Baur's "top tenor" role in The Revelers was taken by Frank Luther and then James Melton (later a Metropolitan Opera tenor). In 1929 The Revelers, with Melton, appeared in one of MGM's Metro Movietone Revue musical shorts -- inevitably titled The Revelers -- filmed in New York and directed by Nick Grinde.

== Radio and recording artists ==
The Revelers were stars on radio and in vaudeville, as well as in the recording studio. On radio they were regulars on The Palmolive Hour (1927–31).

They had recording contracts with Columbia Records and Victor (later RCA Victor) but made extra money by moonlighting under pseudonyms. Columbia promoted them as The Singing Sophomores and Brunswick Records called them The Merrymakers. The group also adopted the names of their radio sponsors: The Eveready Revelers, The Palmolive Revelers, The Seiberling Singers, The General Motors Brigadiers, and The Raleigh Rovers, among others. Ring Lardner observed, "Under any name, they sound as sweet." Lardner outlined his "perfect radio program" for The New Yorker magazine, and found a place for The Revelers along with Paul Whiteman and Fanny Brice.

Although The Revelers stayed current, making a point of including the latest popular songs and show tunes in their repertoire, their sound seemed increasingly old-fashioned. Their listening audience gravitated toward the top soloists of the early 1930s, like Bing Crosby, Arthur Tracy, and Russ Columbo. James Melton left the group in 1933 to embark on a concert career. After the last Revelers record for Victor was released in January 1934, Lewis James and Elliot Shaw retired from the group.

Senior member Wilfred Glenn continued to make live appearances with a male chorus billed as The Revelers. They appeared as a specialty act in the Vitaphone musical short David Mendoza and His Orchestra (1937). The group returned to the recording studio only once, to record a program of 10 traditional religious songs for Decca, in 1938. Glenn's Revelers remained active into the 1940s, culminating in a nationwide tour of 90 concert appearances in 1948. Lewis James joined radio station WGN in Chicago, and Frank Black became prominent as Dr. Frank Black, music director at NBC and recording-company executive.

James Melton's CBS network radio program, Harvest of Stars, brought back Lewis James, Elliot Shaw, Wilfred Glenn, and Frank Black for a Revelers reunion on April 11, 1948. A scripted sketch re-created the group's search for a new "top tenor," followed by a vocal medley of "Dinah," "In a Little Spanish Town," "Sleep, Kentucky Babe," and "Oh! Miss Hannah." Then back to the script:

GLENN: Say, Jim! What about that other song? That catchy one that came out in 1927.
SHAW: The one we sort of helped make popular?
JAMES: The one we recorded 20 years ago?
BLACK: And the one we rehearsed all afternoon?
(group breaks up laughing)

The final song was "I'm Looking Over a Four-Leaf Clover." The group performed it according to the vintage-1927 arrangement, complete with the vocal interpolations straying from the lyrics. The performance unwittingly underscored how dated the group had become, as the 1948 studio audience laughed at all the jazz-age gimmicks.

The Revelers were inducted into The Vocal Group Hall of Fame in 1999. In 2012, a CD titled "A Little Bit of Heaven" was released with 24 of their earliest electrical recordings as The Shannon Quartet.

== Offshoots ==
The Revelers made a comeback (in name only, without Glenn) in 1956. This new male quartet made its debut at the Palace Theatre in New York. Variety noted the revival, and the group's emphasis on old songs as of yore. The new lineup ran the gamut from show tunes to sea chanteys and drinking songs. The personnel: Feodore Tedick or Robert Simpson (first tenor), Thomas Edwards (second tenor), Laurence Bogue (baritone), and Edward Ansara (bass). This foursome is not to be confused with another Revelers group based in Plainfield, New Jersey; this was a mixed quartet that sang at local affairs.

Australian musicologist Frank Bristow has identified four of The Revelers (Baur, Harrison, Shaw, and Glenn) as part of the sextet The Troubadors [sic] with singers Harold Yates and Cooper Lawley.

The German group The Comedian Harmonists formed in 1927 after hearing some records of The Revelers. According to Douglas Friedman's book The Comedian Harmonists (2010), both groups appeared on the same bill at the Scala (Berlin) (former Berliner Eispalast) in August 1929 and became good friends.

== Appearances in other media ==
In 2014, the Revelers' recording of "When Yuba Plays the Rhumba on the Tuba" played over the end credits of Boardwalk Empire's episode 2 of season 5.
