= Gus Haenschen =

American pianist, conductor and composer (1889–1980)

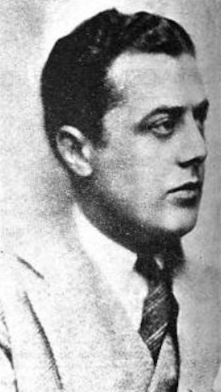
- In the Music Trade Indicator, May 5, 1928
- Born: Walter Gustave Haenschen; November 3, 1889; St. Louis, Missouri
- Died: March 27, 1980 (aged 90); Stamford, Connecticut
- Other names: Carl Fenton, Paul Dupont, Walter Holliday
- Education: Washington University in St. Louis
- Occupations: Arranger, composer, bandleader
- Spouse: Roxanne Hussey (m. 1925)
- Children: 3

Gus Haenschen (November 3, 1889 – March 27, 1980) was a pianist, arranger and composer of music, and orchestra conductor, primarily on U.S. network radio programs.

== Early years ==
Born Walter Gustave Haenschen in St. Louis, Missouri to parents whose relatives had emigrated from Germany and settled in that city. His father was Walter Haenschen, a merchant who became an alcoholic and left his wife, Frieda Gessler Haenschen. His uncle taught music in Europe and in Chicago. Haenschen attended McKinley High School. While he was in elementary school, he carried newspapers to earn money, and as a high-school student he and some friends formed the Eclipse Novelty Company to make pennants to sell at baseball games. As a teenager, he played piano to accompany silent films in St. Louis theaters while refining his technique under the guidance of ragtime composer Scott Joplin, with whom he studied briefly.

Haenschen's involvement in music progressed in 1913, when he was an undergraduate student in mechanical engineering at Washington University in St. Louis. He was asked to help with the university's annual Quadrangle Club musical show, and his involvement grew from helping to a promise "to shoulder the entire musical responsibility for the production". Haenschen asked musicians in St. Louis for advice about conducting and arranging music, and their tips helped him to produce the program and to form a career in music. His band, called "Haenschen's Banjo Orchestra," received many of its bookings from the Rodemich Orchestra Exchange, founded and directed by Gene Rodemich, the son of a prominent St. Louis dentist and leader of a band similar to Haenschen's. In exchange for writing arrangements for Rodemich, a self-taught pianist who could not read music, Haenschen received prime bookings and was paid extra for his arrangements. Eventually, he bought the exchange from Rodemich.

While he continued in his engineering studies, Haenschen began to focus more on music, producing another musical program. That second program included his new composition, "Moorish Tango", which became popular with dancers in the St. Louis area. Some dancers from out of town heard the song when they were visiting, and later Haenschen received a telegram asking for permission to use the song in a Broadway show. That initial use of the song on Broadway caused Haenschen to travel to New York City, where his dealings with Max Dreyfus, a composer, arranger, and head of the T. B. Harms publishing company, resulted not only in the publication of the song as "The Maurice Glide" but also an offer to join the Harms company as a part-time arranger. After that, Florenz Ziegfeld Jr. had lyricist Gene Buck re-title the song "Underneath the Japanese Moon" and incorporated it into the 1914 edition of the Ziegfeld Follies.

== Career ==
=== Early career ===
Haenshcen graduated from Washington University's School of Engineering & Applied Sciences in 1914 as an engineer, but he pursued a career in music. His banjo orchestra was popular and made him "locally famous" in St. Louis. The group's engagements, many of which were acquired from a music-booking agency created by Gene (Eugene Frederick) Rodemich, a self-taught pianist who paid Haenschen to write arrangements for his St. Louis band. With financing from Rodemich's father, a prominent dentist, he and Haenschen formed their own music publishing company, issuing sheet music for their own compositions. Rodemich's agency booked Haenschen's banjo orchestra for open-air dances in St. Louis's city parks. Brewery owner August Anheuser Busch Sr. helped Haenschen to get additional musical work at social events, including country-club dances, and Haenschen's band sometimes played between innings at home games of the Busch-owned St. Louis Cardinals baseball team. Haenschen also became manager of the Vandervoort Music Salon's "talking machine department", a position that he left when he enlisted in the Navy, where he served as an ensign until his June 1918 discharge. In 1919, Haenschen was offered a lucrative position by the Brunswick-Balke-Collander Company as founding director of popular-music releases for the company's new line of recordings, known commercially as Brunswick Records.

=== Radio and television ===
In 1923, Haenschen began his career as a conductor of radio orchestras, starting at WJZ in New York City. He was the orchestra director for Songs Our Mothers Used to Sing, a 13-week series of electrically transcribed radio programs broadcast on WLWL in New York City in 1931–32. In 1928, he and two other Brunswick executives, Percy Deutsch and pianist-arranger Frank Black (of the best-selling recording quintet The Revelers), formed the World Broadcasting Company, also known as the World Broadcasting System. With the popular orchestra leader Ben Selvin as a silent partner, Deutsch, Haenschen, and Black built their own recording facility, called "Sound Studios," for recording high-quality discs of popular and light-classical music for lease to radio stations which could not afford to have their own orchestras. These sixteen-inch discs were known as "transcriptions," and were sent to subscribing radio stations throughout the U.S., especially ones located in less populated areas.

Through their World Broadcasting Company, Gus Haenschen and Frank Black also developed radio programs for large stations in major metropolitan areas. The first of these was "The Champion Hour," sponsored by the automotive-parts company of the same name. Because Champion spark plugs were a nationally known brand, the program's orchestra and chorus were billed as "The Champion Sparkers."

In the mid-1940s, he directed the orchestra at WJR in Detroit. He also conducted orchestras for network radio programs, including The Palmolive Hour, Bayer Musical Review; Coca-Cola Song Shop; Lavender and Old Lace; Maxwell House Show Boat; The Album of American Music; and Saturday Night Serenade. In 1950, Haenschen signed with Harry Bluestone to record The Broadway Parade, a series of transcribed programs. His other transcribed radio programs included Chevrolet Musical Moments Revue.

In the late 1940s, Haenschen and two partners formed HRH Television Features Corporation to produce English versions of grand opera for television. By April 1949 they had 57 operas ready for production. Each opera was condensed in a way that maintained continuity, eliminating "the unimportant and often tiresome parts of the score, retaining only the important parts."

=== Other conducting ===
While he worked for Brunswick Records, Haenschen conducted the company's house orchestra on recordings. Because of anti-German feelings at that time, immediately after World War I, he used the name Carl Fenton Orchestra on record labels. In the mid-1940s, Gus Haenschen's All-String Orchestra was an ensemble affiliated with the Detroit Symphony Orchestra.

=== Composing and arranging ===
Songs composed by Haenschen included "Easy Melody", "Silver Star", "Lullaby of Love", "Manhattan Merry-Go-Round", and "Rosita". He sometimes used the pseudonym Paul Crane for compositions, including "Down on the Farm", "President Harding March", "President Coolidge March", "The St. Louis Society Dance", and (with A. Bernard) "Keep on Going, When You Get Where You're Going You Won't Be Missed at All".Haenschen composed some of the music for the Broadway production Grand Street Follies (1926), and he was the arranger for the musical No Foolin' (1926). He and Arthur W. Profix composed the musical The Hawaiian Follies (1918).

=== Later career ===
After Haenschen stopped conducting, he worked with G. H. Johnston on broadcasts of the Metropolitan Opera and the New York Philharmonic.

== Personal life and death ==
Haenschen married Roxanne Hussy in 1925, and they had two daughters and a son. He received an honorary doctor of music degree from Ithaca College in 1945. He died on March 27, 1980, in Stamford Hospital, aged 90.
