= List of NBC Radio Network programs =

These notable programs were broadcast on the NBC Radio Network and its predecessor, the NBC Red Network.

- The A&P Gypsies
- The Abbott and Costello Show
- Abbott Mysteries
- Abie's Irish Rose
- The Adventures of Ellery Queen
- The Adventures of Frank Merriwell
- The Adventures of Maisie
- The Adventures of Ozzie and Harriet
- The Adventures of Philip Marlowe
- The Adventures of Sam Spade
- The Adventures of the Thin Man
- Against the Storm
- The Al Pearce Show
- The Alan Young Show
- The Aldrich Family
- The Amazing Mr. Malone
- America Dances
- The American Album of Familiar Music
- The American Forum of the Air
- American Portraits
- Arch Oboler's Plays
- Archie Andrews
- Arco Birthday Party
- The Army Hour
- The Atwater Kent Hour
- Aunt Mary
- Author's Playhouse
- The Baby Snooks Show
- Bachelor's Children
- Backstage Wife
- Barrie Craig, Confidential Investigator
- Battle of the Sexes
- Beat the Band
- The Bell Telephone Hour
- The Bickersons
- The Big Show
- The Big Story
- Big Town
- Billy and Betty
- Blondie
- Bob and Ray
- The Bob Crosby Show
- Boston Blackie
- Break the Bank
- Breakfast in Hollywood
- The Brighter Day
- Bring 'Em Back Alive
- Burns and Allen
- Camel Caravan
- Campus Revue
- Can You Top This?
- Candy Matson
- The Capitol Theatre Family Show
- The Carnation Contented Hour
- Cavalcade of America
- The Charlotte Greenwood Show
- The Chase and Sanborn Hour
- The Chesterfield Supper Club
- Cities Service Concerts
- Clara, Lu, and Em
- The Clicquot Club Eskimos
- Cloak and Dagger
- The Colgate Sports Newsreel
- Dan Harding's Wife
- Dark Fantasy
- A Date with Judy
- Death Valley Days
- Dick Tracy
- Dimension X
- Dr. I.Q.
- Dr. Sixgun
- The Dodge Victory Hour
- Dragnet
- The Dreft Star Playhouse
- Drene Time
- Duffy's Tavern
- Easy Aces
- The Eddie Cantor Show
- The Eternal Light
- The Eveready Hour
- Everyman's Theater
- The Falcon
- Father Knows Best
- Fibber McGee and Molly
- The Fifth Horseman
- The First Nighter Program
- The Fleischmann's Yeast Hour
- The Fred Allen Show
- Ford Theatre
- Four Star Playhouse
- The Frank Sinatra Show
- Gasoline Alley
- The General Electric Concert
- Girl Alone
- The Goldbergs
- The Goodrich Silvertown Orchestra
- Goodwill Court
- Grand Central Station
- Grand Ole Opry
- The Great Gildersleeve
- Great Moments in History
- The Guiding Light
- The Halls of Ivy
- The Happiness Boys
- Harvest of Stars
- The High-Jinkers
- Hollywood Playhouse
- Hollywood Star Playhouse
- The Hoover Sentinels
- House of Myths
- I Love a Mystery
- Information Please
- The Ipana Troubadors
- It Pays to Be Ignorant
- It's Higgins, Sir
- Jack Armstrong, the All-American Boy
- The Jack Benny Program
- The Jimmy Durante Show
- Judy and Jane
- The Judy Canova Show
- The Jumbo Fire Chief Program
- Just Plain Bill
- Kraft Music Hall
- Laundryland Lyrics
- Let's Dance
- Li'l Abner
- Life Can Be Beautiful
- The Life of Riley
- Lights Out
- Little Orphan Annie
- Lonely Women
- Lorenzo Jones
- Lum and Abner
- Lux Radio Theatre
- Lyric Famous Challengers
- Ma Perkins
- Major Bowes Amateur Hour
- The Man Called X
- Manhattan Merry-Go-Round
- The March of Time
- The Marriage
- The Martin and Lewis Show
- Martin Kane, Private Eye
- Maxwell House Show Boat
- Mayor of the Town
- Meet Corliss Archer
- Meet the Press
- The Mickey Mouse Theater of the Air
- Monitor
- Mr. and Mrs. North
- Mr. District Attorney
- Mr. I. A. Moto
- Mr. Keen, Tracer of Lost Persons
- Mystery House
- Name That Tune
- National Barn Dance
- NBC Presents: Short Story
- NBC University Theatre
- The New Adventures of Nero Wolfe
- Night Beat
- The O'Neills
- Old Gold on Broadway
- One Man's Family
- Palmolive Beauty Box Theater
- The Palmolive Hour
- The Parade of States
- The Passing Parade
- People are Funny
- Pepper Young's Family
- Pete Kelly's Blues
- The Phil Harris-Alice Faye Show
- Philo Vance
- Portia Faces Life
- Pot o' Gold
- Quiz Kids
- The Railroad Hour
- The Red Skelton Show
- Reg'lar Fellers
- Richard Diamond, Private Detective
- Ripley's Believe It or Not!
- Rising Musical Stars
- Rocky Fortune
- Rosemary
- The Roy Rogers Show
- The Saint
- Screen Directors Playhouse
- The Screen Guild Theater
- Second Husband
- Shell Chateau
- The Six Shooter
- Smackout
- Snow Village Sketches
- The Spike Jones Show
- The Standard Hour
- The Standard School Broadcast
- Stella Dallas
- Stop Me If You've Heard This One
- Strike It Rich
- Stroke of Fate
- Tales of the Texas Rangers
- Terry and the Pirates
- This Is Your Life
- Today's Children
- Tommy Riggs and Betty Lou
- Truth or Consequences
- Uncle Walter's Doghouse
- The United States Steel Hour
- Vic and Sade
- The Vikings
- The Voice of Firestone
- Vox Pop
- We Hold These Truths
- What's My Name?
- When a Girl Marries
- The Whisperer
- Who Said That?
- The World Is Yours
- X Minus One
- You Bet Your Life
- Young Widder Brown
- Your Family and Mine
- Your Hit Parade
