= Family Skeleton =

American old-time radio serial drama

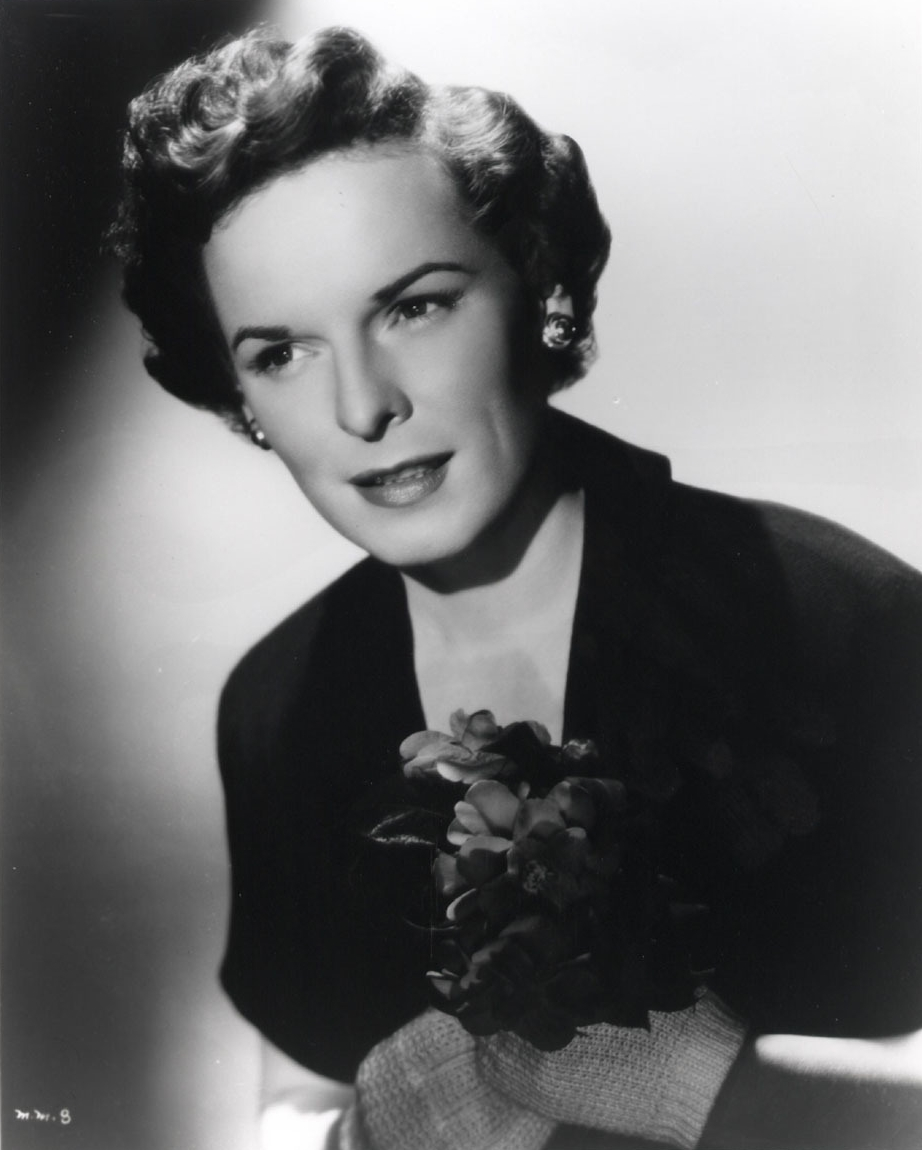
- Mercedes McCambridge star of Family Skeleton
- Genre: Serial drama
- Running time: 15 minutes
- Country of origin: United States
- Language: English
- Syndicates: CBS
- Starring: Mercedes McCambridge
- Announcer: Charles Lyon
- Created by: Carlton E. Morse
- Written by: Carlton E. Morse; Sidney Marshall
- Directed by: Jack Johnstone
- Produced by: Carlton E. Morse
- Original release: June 8, 1953 – March 5, 1954
- Sponsored by: Sweetheart Soap; Prom Home Permanent; Toni Creme Rinse

Family Skeleton is an American old-time radio serial drama, "the story of a girl with a dark past and highly uncertain future." It was broadcast on CBS from June 8, 1953, to March 5, 1954.

Family Skeleton focused on Sara Ann Spence and her problems. She became the "family skeleton" because she arrived at her home pregnant "with her marriage license obliterated by bloodstains" and could not prove her marital status. The sponsors were Sweetheart Soap, Prom Home Permanent and Toni Creme Rinse.

== Personnel ==
Mercedes McCambridge starred in the program. Others in the cast included Parley Baer, Michael Ann Barrett, Tony Barrett, Mary Jane Croft, Dix Davis, John Dehner, Sam Edwards, Eddie Firestone, Frank Gerstle, Robert Griffin, Bill Idelson, Byron Kane, Lou Krugman, Earl Lee, Forrest Lewis, James McCallion, Kate McKenna, Howard McNear, Marvin Miller, George Neise, Jeanette Nolan, Jay Novello, Ruth Perrott, Ken Peters, George Pirrone, Alice Reinheart, Janet Scott, Marilyn Steiner, Russell Thorson, Les Tremayne, David Vail, and Ben Wright. Charles Lyon was the announcer.

Carlton E. Morse, who created Family Skeleton specifically for McCambridge, produced the program and wrote its scripts. Ron Lackmann, in his biography of McCambridge, described the show as being "loosely based on Morse's immensely successful One Man's Family program." Sidney Marshall also wrote for the show. Jack Johnstone was the director.

== See also ==
- List of radio soap operas
