= The Seesaw Girl and Me =

Memoir written by Dick York

The Seesaw Girl and Me cover

The Seesaw Girl and Me (New Path Press, 2004) is a memoir by the American actor Dick York. There is a foreword written by his wife Joan "Joey" York, the “seesaw girl” of the title. York died in 1992, but before his death at the age of 63, he had suffered from emphysema and a debilitating spinal condition, and he would tape-record his late-night recollections of his life.

The memoir is mainly about his childhood, courtship, and marriage, with limited information about his acting co-stars.

== Content ==
York recalls his early life in Indiana, growing up during the Great Depression of the 1930s, and fishing with his Grandma Snyder.

York became a juvenile radio actor, and when he was fifteen he met his future wife when she was twelve-years-old. In 1943 York took over the lead role on the radio series That Brewster Boy. After that he moved to New York, obtained Broadway roles, and began appearing on television.

He married, and became the father of five children. He and Joan "Joey" York remained a "loving and caring couple" even after a back injury sustained while filming They Came to Cordura resulted in lifelong pain, which eventually caused him to be unable to continue working on Bewitched.

The book is a printed copy of York's spoken memories. Though not the main focus of the book there are recollections of meeting fellow performers, including Paul Newman and Gene Kelly.

One reviewer wrote "York crafts one-act plays within his memoir, veering between memory and fiction. The effect is a kind of verbally induced hallucination, albeit one that tragically reminds us how life can turn on a dime."
