= Mixed Doubles (TV series) =

American TV dramatic series (1949)

- Country of origin: United States

Original release
- Network: NBC
- Release: August 5 – October 29, 1949

Mixed Doubles is an American dramatic television series that was broadcast on NBC from August 5, 1949, until October 29, 1949.

== Background ==
Mixed Doubles was created by Carlton E. Morse, who also produced and directed the 30-minute series. It was first broadcast as Slice of Life on the West Coast. Then a 20-minute show, it ran three times a week, with two scripted episodes and one improvised. The title was changed when it debuted nationally on NBC, and the format changed to one scripted 30-minute episode per week. The NBC version was initially broadcast from 9 to 9:30 p.m. Eastern Time on Fridays. In September 1949 it was moved to 8:30 to 9 p.m. E. T. on Saturdays.

== Format and cast ==
Eddy Coleman and Bill Abbott were advertising copywriters. Each had recently married, and the two couples lived in adjacent one-room apartments. The series focused on how the couples were "trying to build their lives on the husbands' meager incomes." The husbands differed in that Coleman was "a healthy go-getter", while Abbott was an "unaggressive" hypochondriac. Elaine Coleman was a "glamorous, frivolous" wife, while Ada Abbott had a serious nature.

The characters and the actors who portrayed them were:

- Eddy Coleman — Eddy Firestone
- Elaine Coleman — Rhoda Williams (first two episodes), Bonnie Baken (rest of series)
- Bill Abbott — Billy Idelson
- Ada Abbott — Ada Friedman
- Eddy's and Bill's boss — Calvin Thomas

== Production ==
Competition for Mixed Doubles on Fridays included Break the Bank on ABC, Key to the Missing on DuMont, and This Is Show Business on CBS. After it was moved to Saturdays, ABC competed with Paul Whiteman's TV Teen Club, while DuMont had Spin the Picture.

Morse decided to end the program so that he could focus his efforts on the television version of One Man's Family.

== Critical response ==
A review of the premiere episode in the trade publication Variety called Mixed Doubles "an entertaining light drama with good possibilities." The review complimented the focus on characters rather than use of cliches and noted that Morse's writing and direction differentiated the couples well. It also noted that in an era of housing shortages "details of life in a crowded flat were realistically handled".

Larry Wolters, writing in the Chicago Daily Tribune, commended Idelson as "the best performer of the lot" on the show. Wolters described the plot as "thin and a little on the unbelievable side", and he disliked the way that an episode ended in a mystery to be resolved the next week.

== Scripts ==
Two scripts from Mixed Doubles are contained in the Carlton E. Morse Papers at Stanford University Libraries.
