= Mystery House (disambiguation) =

Mystery House is an Apple II computer game.

Mystery House may also refer to:

- Mystery House (film), a 1938 American film
- Mystery House (radio drama), an American radio drama series
- Winchester Mystery House, a California tourist attraction
