= Mixed Doubles =

Mixed Doubles may refer to:

== Entertainment ==
- Mixed Doubles (play), a 1969 British play
- Mixed Doubles (1933 film), a British comedy film
- Mixed Doubles (2006 film), an Indian film directed by Rajat Kapoor
- Mixed Doubles (2017 film), a Japanese film
- Mixed Doubles (TV series), an American TV series (1949)
- "Mixed Doubles" (Frasier), a 1996 TV episode
- "Mixed Doubles" (Magnum, P.I.), a 1982 TV episode
- "Mixed Doubles" (The Professionals), a 1980 TV episode
- "Mixed Doubles" (The Upper Hand), a 1993 TV episode

== See also ==
- Mixed doubles sports
