= Kathleen Wilson =

American actress (1911–2005)

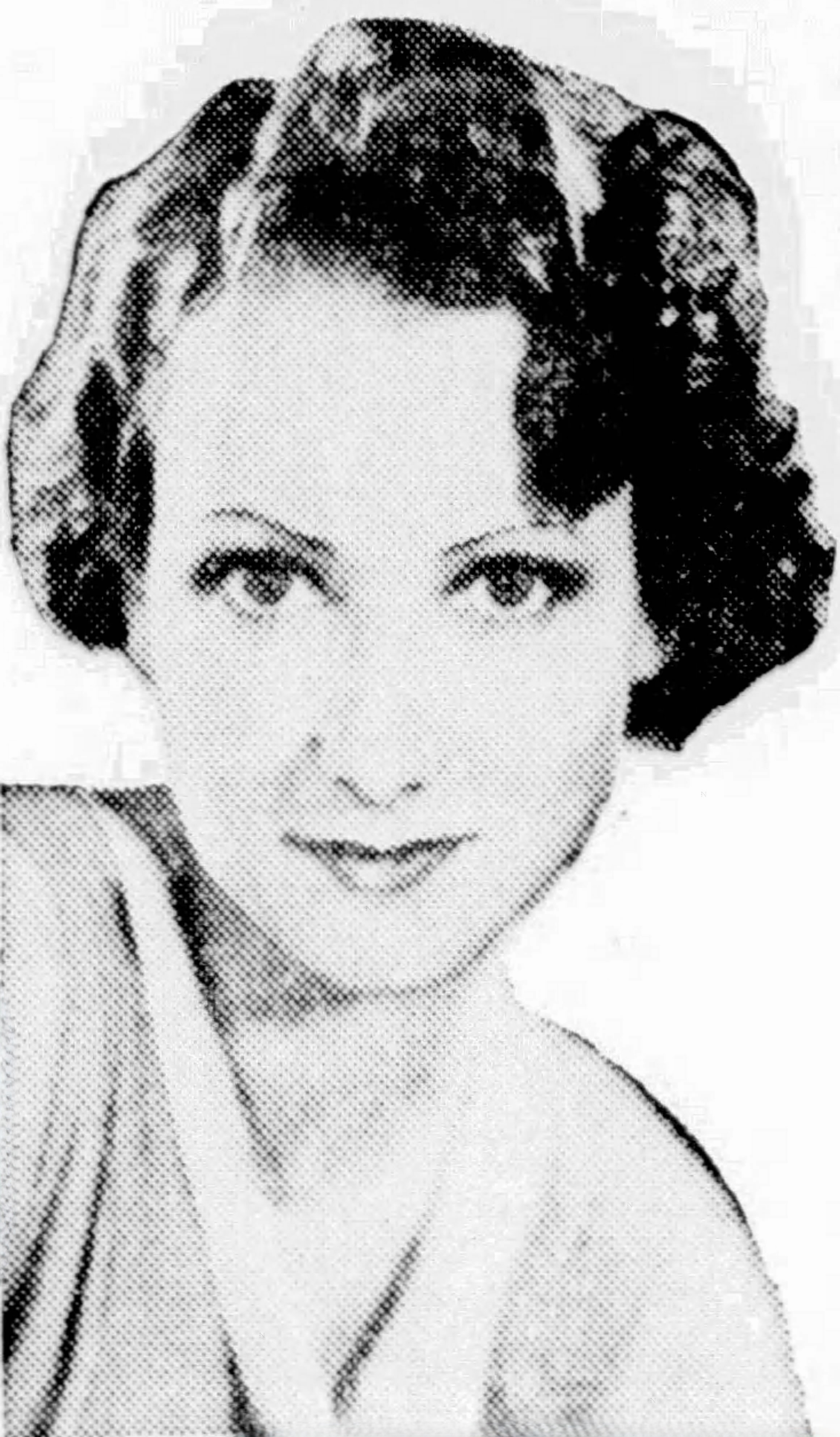
Wilson in 1935

Kathleen Wilson (January 15, 1911 - July 30, 2005) was an American actress who primarily performed on radio programs.

== Early years ==
Wilson was born on January 15, 1911, in Girard, Kansas. She was the daughter of Mr. and Mrs. Ben F. Wilson, and she grew up in Berkeley, California. Her father was a Unitarian minister, writer and lecturer who was associated with Ramsay MacDonald and Philip Snowden at the time of the formation of the British Labour Party. She had two brothers and was a niece of J. Stitt Wilson, a mayor of Berkeley.

She began dancing about as soon as she was able to walk, and at age 6 she appeared with dancer Ruth St. Denis. In 1928 she studied dancing under Vassos and Tenegra Kanellos in Athens, Greece. In 1928-1929 she spent more than a year in Europe, much of it studying in Florence, Italy. While she studied art at a private school there, she became an instructor in dance classes, teaching students about dancing "as interpreted in America". Her activities in Florence included studying fencing with former Italian fencing champion Maestro Piacenti as her instructor.

Actor and director Irving Pichel was a cousin who provided her with early experience on stage. When she was 8 years old, in 1923 she portrayed the title character in the Berkley Playhouse's production of Alice in Wonderland, her stage debut. A review in the Oakland Tribune described Wilson as having "every inch of her brimming with childish charm and naive curiosity" in the production. It added that her portrayal of Alice "delighted children and grown-ups alike".

After she attended Williams Junior College in Berkeley, she studied at the University of California (UC) and won a fencing championship there. While Wilson was a student at UC, in 1921 she was involved as an actress in the creation of a community theater on the campus. Productions of the campus's Little Theater in which she appeared included Hotel Universe, The Youngest, and March Hares.

== Career ==
Wilson acted with the NBC Radio Players in San Francisco while she was in college. Her radio debut came in 1930 in Dead Men Prowl, a Carlton E. Morse mystery serial. Other radio programs on which Wilson appeared included NBC Drama Hour.

She originated the role of Claudia Barbour ("who seems to be the stormy petrel of the Barbour family") on the radio soap opera One Man's Family, a part that Morse wrote for her. When laryngitis prevented her from speaking in 1934, Morse accounted for her absence from the program by having Claudia take a trip to Europe. She was away from the show for almost eight months, and during that time, "hundreds of listeners wrote, phoned, and wired their regrets". Her eventual return brought another response as, at one station, "mails and switchboards were nearly put out of commission" by the volume of reactions from listeners.

Wilson's real life paralleled that of her radio character in 1943. Four weeks after the program had Claudia enrolling in "a woman's class in engineering drawing" at the University of California's War Training facility, Wilson enrolled in a drafting class on UC's Los Angeles campus. She said that her dialogue on the radio series made the training program seem so appealing that she visited the campus to find out what it was really like. "The work is so interesting, too," she said, "and awfully important". She also completed a mechanical course that was required of members of the AWVS motor corps and was a hostess at the Hollywood Canteen.

== Personal life and death ==
Wilson married Rawson Holme at her home in Berkeley on April 7, 1933, with her father officiating. They met when both of them studied art in Europe. They were later divorced. On August 28, 1943, she married publisher Eldridge Haynes at her home in West Los Angeles. He died in 1976. She married British businessman and scientist Alastair Pilkington in 1978. They lived in London until he died in 1995. She returned to the United States in 1998, residing in an assisted-living facility in Falmouth, Maine. She had two sons and a daughter. She died in Falmouth on July 20, 2005, aged 94, after having a stroke.
