= One Man's Family (TV series) =

American TV soap opera

One Man's Family is the name of two American television programs that were broadcast on NBC. The prime-time version ran from November 4, 1949, to June 21, 1952. The daytime version ran from March 1, 1954, to April 1, 1955.

== Overview ==
Created by Carlton E. Morse, One Man's Family began as a radio program in 1932. The series centered around the Barbour family of San Francisco, who lived in the suburb of Sea Cliff in a house that overlooked the Golden Gate Bridge. Although the TV version was produced in New York, "The places members of the family worked and played were in San Francisco." The head of the household was wealthy stockbroker Henry Barbour; his wife was Frances (Franny) Barbour. Their children were

- Paul - a pilot who had been wounded in combat. He was "the philosophical member of the family". His siblings often turned to him as a confidant when they found themselves in trouble.
- Hazel - "whose beauty is offset by her severity of manner". At age 28 she was "very anxious to find a husband" when the series began. She eventually married Bill Herbert.
- Claudia and Cliff - twins, both students at Stanford University. They tended to rebel against the traditional lifestyle of their father.
- Jack - the youngest at age 10. He was "mischevous and loved by all".

The program was "a saga of family life, treating with sympathetic humor the trials and tribulations of today's younger generation, their parents and grandparents".

== Differences from radio version ==
While the characters and situations in the radio version of One Man's Family had progressed over the years, each TV version began where the radio version had begun. By the time the first TV version debuted, the radio Barbours had "experienced all the events that may occur in a family during 18 years" including the addition of grandchildren. People who watched the TV shows and concurrently listened to the continuing radio series found that the 10-year-old TV Jack was married with six children on radio. The radio counterparts of the TV college-age twins were 37 years old, and each had been married twice. The actress who portrayed Claudia on the daytime TV version was playing Claudia's daughter on the radio version.

In 1951, Morse said about the TV version, “Father Barbour has become much more human than the stuffed-shirt character I created for radio; Mother Barbour is a more brilliant, society-type woman.”

== Prime-time version ==
=== Background ===
NBC asked Morse to create One Man's Family for TV as a program to compete with The Goldbergs on CBS. Initial plans called for TV broadcasts to begin on July 25, 1949, with Morse writing and directing the series. He was to bring nine members of the radio series's cast East to appear on the TV version after they had transcribed 16 radio episodes to travel and focus on the TV show. The trade publication Billboard reported in June 1949 that after the "tele version is set", using actors in their roles from the radio series, the group was to return to Hollywood to produce the series. Episodes were to be broadcast locally on station KNBH and later shown on NBC's Eastern coaxial network via kinescope recording. The projected premiere date was later moved to August 1, 1949. That change was followed by a postponement to August 8, 1949. By mid-October the premiere date had been set for November 4, 1949. Shortly before the first episode was broadcast, Billboard reported that the TV version would have different actors from those used on the radio version.

=== Plot ===
The series' plot developments included problems in the marriages of both Hazel and Claudia, Paul's adoption of Teddy Lawson, and Claudia's dealings with Sir Guy Vane, a sinister character whom she met in Paris, in addition to "assorted illnesses, family feuds, and intrigues".

=== Cast ===
Cast of One Man's Family (Prime-time Version)
Character	Actor(s)
Father Barbour	Bert Lytell
Mother Barbour	Marjorie Gateson
Jack Barbour	Arthur Cassell, Richard Wigginton
Cliff Barbour	Billy Idelson, James Lee, Frank Thomas Jr.
Hazel Barbour	Patricia Robbins, Lillian Schaff
Claudia Barbour	Nancy Franklin, Eva Marie Saint
Paul Barbour	Russell Thorson
Johnny Roberts	Michael Higgins
Judge Hunter	Calvin Thomas
Dr. Thompson	Luis Van Rooten
Beth Holly	Mercedes McCambridge, Susan Shaw
Mr. Roberts	Ralph Locke
Mrs. Roberts	Mona Bruns
Betty Carter	Norma Jean Marlowe
Judith Richardson	Athena Lorde
Danny Frank	John Newland
Mac	Tony Randall
Joe Yarbourogh	Jim Boles
Bill Herbert	Les Tremayne, Walter Brooke
Teddy Lawton	Madeline Belgard
Ann Waite	Nancy Franklin
Burton	Billy Greene
Captain Nicholas Lacey	Lloyd Bochner
Sergeant Tony Adams	Michael McAloney
Sir Guy Vane	Maurice Manson
Jo Collier	Gina Holland

=== Production ===
Morse wrote and produced the series. Clark Jones was the director. The program originated from WNBT to NBC's Eastern and Midwestern networks. It was sustaining until July 29, 1950, when Sweetheart Soap became its sponsor. In September 1951, Miles Laboratories agreed to become an alternate-week sponsor of the program, which at that time was carried on 63 stations. Sponsor-related problems caused the series to end in 1952. Harry MacArthur explained the situation in a September 9, 1952, column in The (Washington, D. C.) Evening Star:

It had two sponsors on an alternate week basis last season. One of these decided not to go along this year. NBC rounded up a replacement with a bankroll and then the second of the two original sponsors wanted out. Now came still another sponsor into the confusion. This one wanted the 7:30 p.m. Saturday time slot for selling cigarettes via a new telefilm series featuring Robert Cummings. Looked good to NBC, so that third sponsor was talked into cancelling the "Family" contract.

The theme song was "Deserted Mansion".

One Man's Family was the first TV show to implement a rear-projection system developed by NBC personnel and the Holmes Projection Company. The system used a specially designed projector to display standard 24-frames-per-second motion pictures on a translucent background projection screen in such a way that flicker was eliminated when a standard 30-frames-per-second TV camera picked up live action in front of the screen. The system was first used on the program on January 13, 1950. One scene showed a trip on a cable car while actors stood in a fabricated portion of a streetcar in the foreground. Another scene had actors in a portion of an automobile while the projection displayed a trip to and over the Golden Gate Bridge.

=== Schedule ===
Time Slots for One Man's Family on TV
Effective Date	Day of Week	Starting Time (Eastern Time)
November 4, 1949	Friday	8 p.m.
January 26, 1950	Thursday	8:30 p.m.
May 17, 1950	Wednesday	8:30 p.m.
July 1950	Saturday	7:30 p.m.

=== Critical response ===
A review by John Lester in The Newark Star-Ledger praised the show's premiere episode, citing both the acting and the staging. He wrote, "This looks like another first-class family situation series with just a little more meat to it than the rest."

June Bundy wrote in Billboard that the TV premiere essentially repeated the content of the radio program's first nationwide broadcast, but "the family problems (frustration, war neuroses, flaming youth and attempted homicide), which aired as harmless soap opera [on radio], appeared downright vicious on TV". The review complimented the sets, camera work, and casting.

Sid Shalit, writing in the (New York) Daily News, called One Man's Family "a refreshing addition to video — and more proof that the real pros are swarming into the new medium". He added that the premiere episode was "a refreshing adult study of believable people, written and acted with unerring good taste and a deep understanding of human nature".

Larry Wolters commented in the Chicago Daily Tribune that changing actors on the program resulted in confusion for viewers. In one episode, Hazel became engaged to Bill Herbert, who was portrayed by "a balding chap with a mustache", but a few weeks later when she went with Herbert to select a ring, the actor playing her fiance was "a curly-topped fellow without a mustache". Wolters added that, by December 1950, two actresses had portrayed Claudia, and three actors had portrayed Cliff.

A review in the trade publication Variety described the series's resumption on July 29, 1950, as "overloaded with plot" and called some of the dialog "ludicrous" but said that a flashback sequence that tried to compress nine months' developments into the half-hour episode was "well-contrived". The review said that "stilted lines and a flat character" limited Lytell's performance, but it complimented the performances of Saint, Thorson, and Gateson.

== Daytime version ==
After One Man's Family went off TV, "many inquiries ... poured into the NBC studios from viewers and critics throughout the country concerning the program's status." Such requests resulted in revival of the series. The show returned to NBC on March 1, 1954, in a 15-minute daytime version that was part of "a new line-up of morning programs" on the network. It originated from NBC's then-new studios in Burbank, California, and was sustaining. Morse was the executive producer, Richard Clemmer was the producer, and Jack Smight was the director. Originally broadcast at 10:30 a.m. E. T., it was moved to 3 p.m. E. T. beginning July 5, 1954.

Cast of One Man's Family (Daytime Version)
Character	Actor
Father Barbour	Theodore Von Eltz
Mother Barbour	Mary Adams
Paul	Russell Thorson
Clifford	Jimmy Lee
Claudia	Anne Whitfield
Hazel	Linda Leighton
Jack	Martin Dean
Johnny Roberts	Jack Edwards
Beth Holly	Lois Hall
Johnny MacPherson	Glen Vernon
Dr. Thompson	Emerson Treacy

=== Critical response ===
C. E. Butterfield wrote in The Richmond News Leader that changes in the cast made it "difficult for me, as one who has listened to and watched the Barbours almost from the program's beginning, to realize it really was 'One Man's Family'". Overcoming that hindrance, he added, would take some time, "even though the new cast includes some of the better talent from Hollywood".
