= Elliott Reid =

American actor (1920–2013)

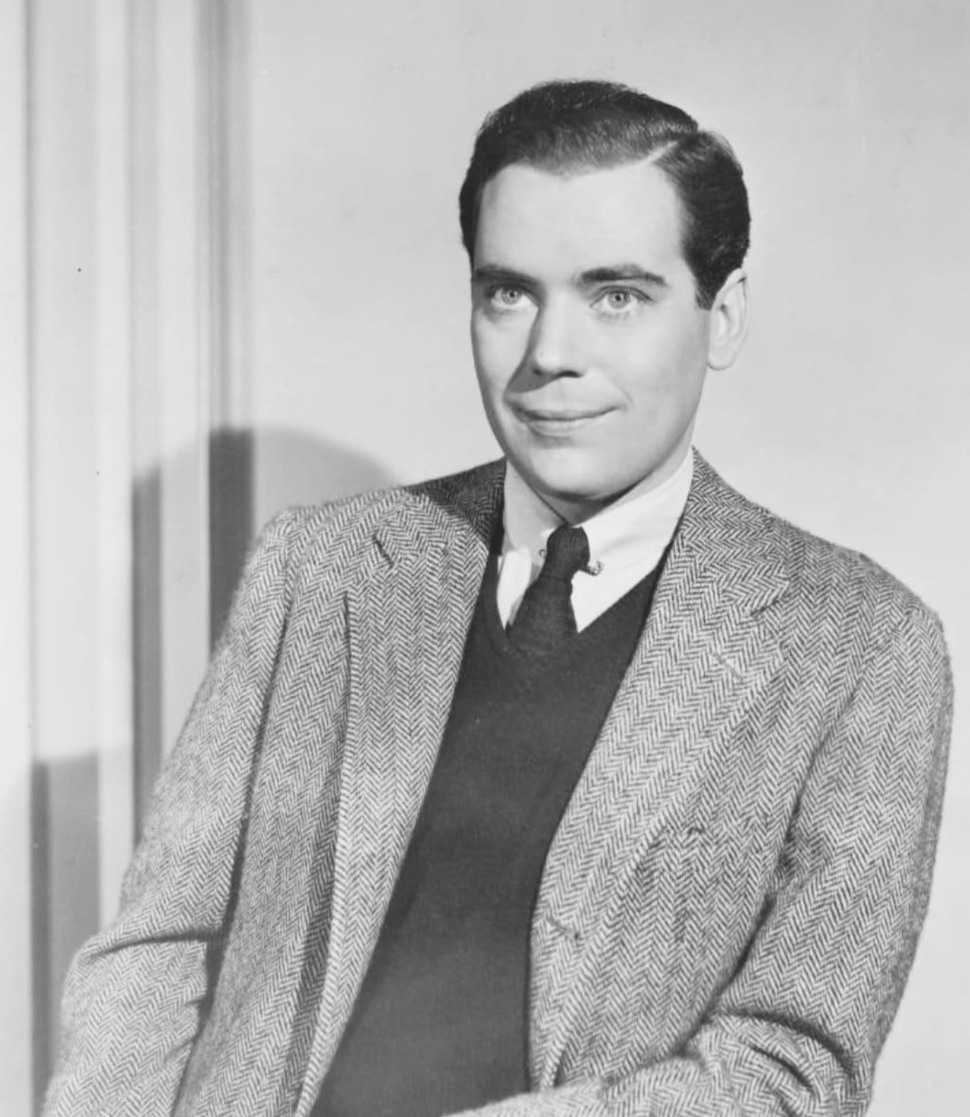
- Reid in 1953
- Born: Edgeworth Blair Reid; January 16, 1920; Manhattan, New York City, U.S.
- Died: June 21, 2013 (aged 93); Studio City, California, U.S.
- Other names: Ted Reid
- Occupation: Actor
- Years active: 1935–1995

Edgeworth Blair "Elliott" Reid (January 16, 1920 – June 21, 2013) was an American actor.

== Early life ==
Reid was born in Manhattan, the son of artist Christine Challenger Reid and banker Blair Reid. He attended the Professional Children's School.

== Radio ==
In 1935, Reid debuted on the radio program The March of Time, which led to regular work on radio dramas during the golden age of radio. He portrayed Melvin Castleberry on the children's program Billy and Betty, and Philip Cameron on the serial Against the Storm and was a host on radio's version of The United States Steel Hour. Early on he took "Elliott" as his stage name. His credits include many Orson Welles-directed stage and radio productions, such as The Mercury Theatre on the Air. He also acted on Theatre Guild on the Air, The Adventures of Philip Marlowe, Suspense, and the CBS Radio Mystery Theater. In some early performances he was credited as "Ted Reid".

== Film ==
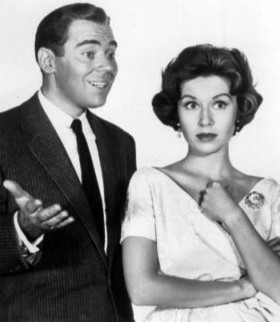
Reid with Pat Crowley in 1959

Reid's best-known film role was as Ernie Malone, private detective hired to spy on Marilyn Monroe's character, only to become Jane Russell's love interest, in the 20th Century Fox classic Gentlemen Prefer Blondes (1953). Variety praised his and Tommy Noonan's performances, saying that "Reid and Noonan carry off the romantic male spots nicely".

Reid played the snide Professor Shelby Ashton of Rutland University (the rival of perennial underdog Medfield College) in two Walt Disney movies starring Fred MacMurray: The Absent-Minded Professor in 1961, and its sequel Son of Flubber in 1963. Also in 1963, Reid appeared in the comedy The Wheeler Dealers starring James Garner and Lee Remick, with Pat Crowley in a supporting role. Reid portrayed Ralph Hastings in Disney's 1966 movie Follow Me, Boys! and a television commentator in Disney's Blackbeard's Ghost in 1968.

== Television ==
A member of The Actors Studio from its inception, Reid was a regular in NBC television's That Was the Week That Was (1964–1965). Although he was signed to be the series's anchor-host, his role was reduced. He portrayed Warren Winslow on the CBS comedy Miss Winslow and Son (1979). He also made guest appearances on Murder, She Wrote, The Odd Couple, I Love Lucy, It's Always Jan, Barney Miller, Small Wonder, Perry Mason, and The Munsters.

In 1992 Reid appeared in the season three Seinfeld episode "The Letter", as one of the collectors considering buying a painting of Kramer. Reid's final television role was as Henry on the episode "Please Re-Lease Me" of the television sitcom Maybe This Time. He retired in 1995, but returned for an uncredited role as Miguel in the 2000 short film 13 Heads of Hair and the role of Buddy in the feature film Scattering Mother in 2005.

== Impressions ==
Among his special skills, Elliot Reid was also an accomplished impressionist. He was so famous with his John F. Kennedy impersonation that, in 1962, he was invited to perform it in front of Kennedy in person; Kennedy was happy with the performance. One reference book said, "His mimicking of John F. Kennedy opened up a mini-career in clubs in the early 1960s.". He appeared as a diner customer in The Lucy Show episode "Lucy Visits the White House," season one, episode 25, which aired March 25, 1963, and also provided the off-camera voice of JFK at the end of the episode.

== Stage ==
Reid's Broadway credits include Julius Caesar (1937–1938), The Shoemaker's Holiday (1938), Macbeth (1948), Two Blind Mice (1949), The Live Wire (1950), Two on the Aisle (1951–1952), and From A to Z (1960).

He co-starred as Felix Unger in the Chicago company of The Odd Couple with Dan Dailey as Oscar Madison from 1966–67 and returned to co-star with Virginia Mayo in No, No, Nanette from 1972-73. In 1976 he co-starred with Carol Channing in the national tour of The Bed Before Yesterday.

== Death ==
Reid died of heart failure on June 21, 2013, at age 93. His nephew stated that Reid had been residing in an assisted living facility in Studio City, California, for several years prior to his death.

== Selected filmography ==
- The Ramparts We Watch (1940) – Ralph Gilchrist
- Young Ideas (1943) – Jeff Evans
- The Story of Dr. Wassell (1944) – William 'Andy' Anderson
- A Double Life (1947) – Actor in 'A Gentleman's Gentleman'
- Sierra (1950) – Duke Lafferty
- The Whip Hand (1951) – Matt Corbin
- Gentlemen Prefer Blondes (1953) – Ernie Malone
- Vicki (1953) – Steve Christopher
- Woman's World (1954) – Tony Andrews
- Alfred Hitchcock Presents (1955) (Season 1 Episode 8: "Our Cook's a Treasure") - Earl Kramer
- Alfred Hitchcock Presents (1958) (Season 4 Episode 6: "Design for Loving") - Tom Smith
- Inherit the Wind (1960) – Prosecutor Tom Davenport
- The Absent-Minded Professor (1961) – Professor Shelby Ashton
- The Alfred Hitchcock Hour (1963) (Season 2 Episode 10: "Good-Bye, George") - Dave Dennis
- Son of Flubber (1963) – Professor Shelby Ashton
- The Thrill of It All (1963) – Mike Palmer
- It's a Mad, Mad, Mad, Mad World (1963) – Dr. Chadwick (voice, uncredited)
- The Wheeler Dealers (1963) – Leonard
- Move Over, Darling (1963) – Dr. Herman Schlick
- Who's Been Sleeping in My Bed? (1963) – Tom Edwards
- Follow Me, Boys! (1966) – Ralph Hastings
- Blackbeard's Ghost (1968) – TV Commentator
- Some Kind of a Nut (1969) – Gardner Anderson
- Heaven Can Wait (1978) – Waiter (uncredited)
- Young Einstein (1988) – Asylum Guard
