= Lyric Famous Challengers =

Lyric Famous Challengers was a radio series broadcast on the NBC Red Network in 1929.

The program combined music and drama, depicting conflicts and challenges in the music world. For instance, one program dramatized the confrontation of Richard Wagner with a music critic, incorporating Wagnerian excerpts along with music popular in Wagner's time. Another presented incidents in the life of Beethoven.

The series aired on Saturday evening at 8pm ET, usually preceded by Phil Spitalny's Orchestra and followed by Laundryland Lyrics and The General Electric Concert.
