= Laundryland Lyrics =

Laundryland Lyrics is a music program broadcast on NBC beginning on October 12, 1927.

The show was sponsored by the Laundryowners' Association of the United States and Canada. Josef Koestner conducted the 20-piece orchestra in NBC's Chicago studios.

The program of November 23, 1929 featured soprano Bernice Taylor and tenor Fred Waldner. With Koestner conducting, the duo sang "Anything Your Heart Desires".

The series aired on Saturday evening at 8:30pm ET, usually preceded by Phil Spitalny's Orchestra and Lyric Famous Challengers and followed by The General Electric Concert.
