= Russell Thorson =

American actor (1906–1982)

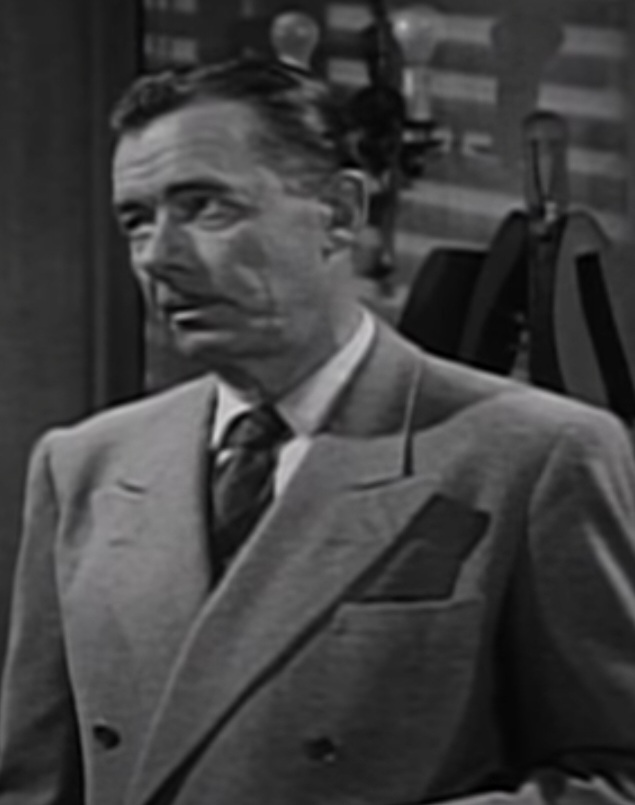
- Thorson in Hot Rod Girl (1956)
- Born: October 14, 1906; Eau Claire, Wisconsin, U.S.
- Died: July 6, 1982 (aged 75)
- Education: University of Montana
- Occupation: Actor
- Years active: 1941–1978

Russell Thorson (October 14, 1906 – July 6, 1982 ) was an American actor, perhaps best known for his co-starring role as Det. Lt. Otto Lindstrom in ABC's 1959–1962 hit crime drama, The Detectives Starring Robert Taylor.

== Background ==
Thorson was born in Eau Claire, Wisconsin, and his family moved to Montana when he was 12 years old. In 1930, Thorson graduated with a degree in journalism from the University of Montana in Missoula, Montana.

== Career ==
In the early 1940s, Thorson played Charles Meredith in Midstream on radio, replacing Hugh Studebaker when Studebaker had health problems. He starred in a later version (1949–1952) of the radio series, I Love a Mystery, as Jack Packard, alongside Jim Boles as Doc and Tony Randall as Reggy. His other radio parts included the title roles in The Tom Mix Ralston Straightshooters and Dr. Paul and Bart Friday in Adventures by Morse. He was also a member of the cast of Family Skeleton. In 1955, he began portraying Paul Barbour on the radio version of One Man's Family after having had the same role in the TV version of the program.

Thorson had small roles for film and television in Double Dynamite (1951), with Jane Russell, Groucho Marx and Frank Sinatra, Dangerous Mission (1954). He has also appeared in several classic movies, including Johnny Concho (1956), 36 Hours (1965), The Stalking Moon (1968), and Walking Tall (1973).

Most of his career was spent on television. He is best remembered for playing the role of Det. Lt. Otto Lindstrom in The Detectives from 1959 to 1961. He made four guest appearances on CBS's Perry Mason, including three episodes during the first two seasons from 1958 to 1959.

He appeared in guest-starring roles in such television series as Maverick (as the stalwart Marshal Walt Hardie in a James Garner episode titled "Day of Reckoning"), Gilligan's Island, Tales of Wells Fargo, Trackdown, Wagon Train, Gunsmoke (as Mr. Brady in “Chester’s Mail Order Bride” - 1956), Lassie, Peyton Place, and The Virginian, and is also known for his role as a ship captain in "Cocoon", the pilot episode of CBS's original Hawaii Five-O with Jack Lord.

== Filmography ==
Film
Year	Title	Role	Notes
1949	Easy Living	Hunk Edwards	(as Russ Thorson)
1951	Double Dynamite	Tailman	(as Russ Thorson)
1954	Dangerous Mission	Radio Operator	Uncredited
1956	Please Murder Me	Trial judge	(as Russ Thorson)
1956	Hot Rod Girl	Detective Captain	
1956	Gunsmoke (S1E21)	Mr. Bowers	(as Russ Thorson)
1956	Johnny Concho	Sheriff	Uncredited
1957	The Gray Ghost	Greene	TV series
1957	Destination 60,000	Dan Maddox	
1957	The Sheriff of Cochise	Willis	TV series
1957	Alfred Hitchcock Presents	Dr. Rhody	Season 2 Episode 35: "The West Warlock Time Capsule"
1957	Undersea Girl	Commander Watkins	Uncredited
1957	Zero Hour!	Vancouver Flight Dispatcher	
1957	Have Gun – Will Travel	Col. Harrison	TV series
1957–1958	Sugarfoot	Jim Travis / Sheriff	TV series
1957–1958	Dick Powell's Zane Grey Theatre	Judge / Mason / Walter Harrison	TV series
1957–1962	Tales of Wells Fargo	Wells Fargo Manager	TV series
1958	Gun Fever	Thomas Rand	
1958	Cowboy	Cattle Buyer	Uncredited
1958	The True Story of Lynn Stuart	Man at Coroner's Inquest	Uncredited
1958	Run Silent, Run Deep	Submarine Crewman	Uncredited
1958	Gunman's Walk	Cattleman	Uncredited
1958	Jefferson Drum	Bert Temple	TV series
1958	When Hell Broke Loose	Col. Crandall	Uncredited
1958	Tarawa Beachhead	Casey Nelson	
1958	I Want to Live!	San Quentin Sgt.	
1958	The Texan	Sheriff	TV series
1958	Half Human: The Story of the Abominable Snowman	Prof. Philip Osborne	
1959	Good Day for a Hanging	Harry Landers	
1959	Trackdown	Dr. Aaron Hosper / Sheriff Jesse Jackson	TV series
1959	The Last Angry Man	Bennett – City Editor of New York Mirror	Uncredited
1959	Battle of the Coral Sea	Adm. Gibney	Uncredited
1959–1961	The Detectives Starring Robert Taylor	Det. Lt. Otto Lindstrom	TV series
1960	Gunfighters of Abilene	Marshal Wilkinson	
1960	The Man from Blackhawk	Perry	TV series
1960	The Music Box Kid	Margaret's Father	Uncredited
1960	Wanted: Dead or Alive	The Sheriff	Season 2 Episode 19 "The Monster"
1963	The Alfred Hitchcock Hour	Deputy Sheriff Geary	Season 1 Episode 17: "Forecast: Low Clouds and Coastal Fog"
1963	Gunsmoke	Pa Willis	TV series (S9E13)
1963	Empire	Austin	TV series
1963	Sam Benedict	Thomas Morgan	Uncredited
1963	It Happened at the World's Fair	Sheriff Garland	Uncredited
1963	The Virginian	Sheriff Stan Evans	TV series episode "Echo of Another Day"
1963	The Virginian	Sheriff Tybee	TV series
1963	The Lieutenant	Sallaway Sr.	TV series
1963	Temple Houston	Red Gilman	TV series
1964	The Greatest Show on Earth	Hickey	TV series
1964	Where Love Has Gone	Mayor Barrett	Uncredited
1964	36 Hours	General Allison	
1965	The Virginian	Ollie	TV series
1965	Lassie	Doc Reynolds (veterinarian)	TV series
1965	Two on a Guillotine	Mr. Carmichael, Val's editor	
1965	My Blood Runs Cold	Sheriff	
1966	The Plainsman	Marshal Hart	Uncredited
1967	A Covenant with Death	Dr. Shilling	
1967	The Invaders	Sheriff	TV series – episode "The Enemy"
1968	Cimarron Strip	Hank Marlin	TV series
1967–1968	Peyton Place	William Kennerly	TV series
1968	Hang 'Em High	Maddow, Cooper Hanging Party	
1968	The Stalking Moon	Ned	
1969	The Big Valley	Otis Clark	TV series
1969	The Learning Tree	Judge Cavanaugh	
1970	The F.B.I.	Derelict	TV series
1970	The Virginian	Josh Dorcas	Season 8 Episode 23 "Rich Man, Poor Man"
1971	Mission Impossible	Warden	TV series episode "Nerves"
1973	Walking Tall	Ferrin Meaks	
1973	Police Story	Dana	TV series
1975	Guilty or Innocent: The Sam Sheppard Murder Case	Judge Edwards	TV movie
1977	Quinn Martin's Tales of the Unexpected	Scottie	TV series
1978	The Rockford Files	Arthur Kenner	TV series, (final appearance)

== Other sources ==
- Harmon, Jim (2003) Radio Mystery and Adventure and Its Appearances in Film, Television and Other Media (McFarland & Company) ISBN 978-0786418107
