= Adventures by Morse =

American radio series

- Carlton E. Morse
- Genre: Adventure
- Running time: 30 minutes
- Country of origin: United States
- Language: English
- Starring: Elliott Lewis; David Ellis; Russell Thorson; Barton Yarborough
- Written by: Carlton E. Morse
- Produced by: Carlton E. Morse
- No. of episodes: 52

Adventures by Morse is a syndicated adventure series produced, written and directed by Carlton E. Morse in the mid-1940s, shortly after NBC canceled his I Love a Mystery series. Morse produced 52 episodes of the program, each 30 minutes long.

== Characters and stories ==
Captain Bart Friday was a globe-trotting San Francisco-based private investigator, portrayed during the series by Elliott Lewis, David Ellis and Russell Thorson. Friday's sidekick from Texas, Skip Turner, was played mostly by Jack Edwards and occasionally by Barton Yarborough.

The tales covered such areas as espionage, kidnapping and murder, along with secret Nazi bases, snake worshipers and voodoo.

== Dating problem and episode order ==
The 52 30-minute episodes (and two sales pitches) were produced in the mid-1940s. Dates of production and the earliest broadcasts are uncertain. Several Internet sites mention that the entire series was broadcast in 1944, but in the final two chapters of It's Dismal to Die, it is clearly stated that the Second World War has ended. Advertisements have been found for broadcasts in 1946 and 1949.

The series was presented in 13-episode blocks (each containing two stories), with each ten-chapter story ending with a teaser for the following three-chapter story. The City of the Dead and A Coffin for the Lady are mentioned in the promotional recordings as the first and second story respectively. The order used below is the one found most often on fan sites on the Internet.

== Episodes ==
- 01 The City of the Dead (1 of 10)
- 02 The City of the Dead (2 of 10) "I've Dug Up Something Ghastly"
- 03 The City of the Dead (3 of 10) "The Body that Walked Off"
- 04 The City of the Dead (4 of 10) "Old Clawfoot Again"
- 05 The City of the Dead (5 of 10) "The Skeleton Walks In"
- 06 The City of the Dead (6 of 10) "The Ghoul in the Grave"
- 07 The City of the Dead (7 of 10) "Captain Friday Vanishes"
- 08 The City of the Dead (8 of 10) "The Kidnapping of Clawfoot"
- 09 The City of the Dead (9 of 10) "The Trail of the Phantom Church Bell"
- 10 The City of the Dead (10 of 10) "Where the Pearls Were Hidden"

Mysterious adventures in a cemetery known as "The City of the Dead" where Captain Friday's father is the caretaker or "Mayor", a phantom with clawed feet prowls the graves, a bell rings in an old abandoned church where there is no bell and two young people who seem to have been innocently caught up in events may be more involved than they let on.

- 11 A Coffin for the Lady (1 of 3)
- 12 A Coffin for the Lady (2 of 3) "The Conversation in the Casket"
- 13 A Coffin for the Lady (3 of 3) "The Deepest Grave in the World"

An Army Intelligence officer contacts Captain Friday's San Francisco office, looking to hire a pair of operatives for a mysterious mission. Transported to a small, isolated cove off the coast of Canada, Friday, Turner, and a Major Lawrence find a speedboat waiting for them, which they use to get to Marmaduke Island. Warned by Lawrence that the duo will need to be "ready for action" at any given moment, three hours pass, then, suddenly, an Army GI appears out of the underbrush carrying a heavily bound and gagged woman in his arms. Friday and Turner quickly observe that the man has been mortally wounded - a knife is sticking out of his back - and his last words before dying are to instruct the men to get the woman to shore immediately.

- 14 The Cobra King Strikes Back (1 of 10)
- 15 The Cobra King Strikes Back (2 of 10) "Something about the Hooded Snake"
- 16 The Cobra King Strikes Back (3 of 10) "The Mad King of Angkor"
- 17 The Cobra King Strikes Back (4 of 10) "Temple of Gorillas"
- 18 The Cobra King Strikes Back (5 of 10) "The Living Image of Cambodia"
- 19 The Cobra King Strikes Back (6 of 10) "Terrors of the Hollow Mountain"
- 20 The Cobra King Strikes Back (7 of 10) "The Face of a Beast"
- 21 The Cobra King Strikes Back (8 of 10) "It Was Not Cannibalism"
- 22 The Cobra King Strikes Back (9 of 10) "The Fangs and Teeth of the Enemy"
- 23 The Cobra King Strikes Back (10 of 10) "The Amazing End of an Expedition"

Adventures in Cambodia

- 24 The Girl on Shipwreck Island (1 of 3)
- 25 The Girl on Shipwreck Island (2 of 3) "The Pirate is a Fighting Man"
- 26 The Girl on Shipwreck Island (3 of 3) "There is More About Gracie Than Meets the Eye"

While traveling from French Indo-China to Australia, the engine on Bart and Skip's plane conks out, forcing them to land on a small island in the South China Sea. Initially, they believe themselves to be alone, but it isn't long before they witness the murder of a British sailor, one of a small number of castaways who recently survived a deadly hurricane at sea. The murder has been committed by a Spanish pirate, complete with bandana, who seems mighty proud of his skill with a gun. In addition to the mayhem on this supposedly deserted island they experience the strange allure of a cockney serving girl named Gracie, who seems to be the object of much jealousy and intrigue.

- 27 Dead Men Prowl (1 of 10)
- 28 Dead Men Prowl (2 of 10) "The Prowler at Work"
- 29 Dead Men Prowl (3 of 10) "The Dead Do Walk at Night"
- 30 Dead Men Prowl (4 of 10) "Conversation with the Walking Dead"
- 31 Dead Men Prowl (5 of 10) "The Walking Dead Captured"
- 32 Dead Men Prowl (6 of 10) "Life History of Prowlers"
- 33 Dead Men Prowl (7 of 10) "Four Go to Join the Prowling Dead"
- 34 Dead Men Prowl (8 of 10) "The Prowler with the Rope Around His Neck"
- 35 Dead Men Prowl (9 of 10) "The Prowler Dead Walk Again"
- 36 Dead Men Prowl (10 of 10) "The Prowling Dead Introduces Himself"

Adventures on a small island near San Francisco

- 37 You'll Be Dead in a Week (1 of 3)
- 38 You'll Be Dead in a Week (2 of 3) "$200,000 to Lose"
- 39 You'll Be Dead in a Week (3 of 3)

Skip and Captain Friday are called to Hollywood to meet with a woman named Eve Carson who, with her brother Wesley, inherited over a million dollars from her late father. Shortly after the death of their last living relative, Eve and Wesley moved to California, where they lived happily for a time. Then, one morning, Wes loses consciousness and, after consultations with many doctors and specialists, is told that he has but one week left to live. Rather than be depressed at the news, Wesley chooses instead to live it up for the time he has left, but "living it up" has come to mean an association with gangster Blackie North and his gang of thugs. Eve begs Skip and Captain Friday to watch over her brother to see that he comes to no harm...but soon after, they find themselves engaged in a vicious barroom free-for-all with North and his henchmen.

- 40 The Land of the Living Dead (1 of 10)
- 41 The Land of the Living Dead (2 of 10)
- 42 The Land of the Living Dead (3 of 10) "The Green-Eyed Murderess Again"
- 43 The Land of the Living Dead (4 of 10) "The Tree that Eats Flesh"
- 44 The Land of the Living Dead (5 of 10)
- 45 The Land of the Living Dead (6 of 10)
- 46 The Land of the Living Dead (7 of 10) "The Terror of the Sacred City"
- 47 The Land of the Living Dead (8 of 10)
- 48 The Land of the Living Dead (9 of 10)
- 49 The Land of the Living Dead (10 of 10)

Adventures in the Chilian jungle

- 50 It's Dismal to Die (1 of 3)
- 51 It's Dismal to Die (2 of 3)
- 52 It's Dismal to Die (3 of 3) "Bad Medicine for the Doctor"

Skip Turner (Jack Edwards) has always been a sucker for a beautiful woman in distress, and no woman is more beautiful or more in distress than Julie Lane, a black-haired, blue-eyed beauty who calls for help from Turner and Captain Bart Friday (Russell Thorson) when her young husband is lost in Dismal Swamp near Lake Drummond, South Carolina. Finding themselves piloting a flat-bottomed boat through dark, dank, weed-infested waters, the trio searches for the missing husband and quickly discovers that he isn't dead but instead has been kidnapped.

== See also ==
- Audio theatre
- Old-time radio

== Listen to ==
- Internet Archive : Adventures by Morse
