= J. Anthony Smythe =

American actor (1885–1966)

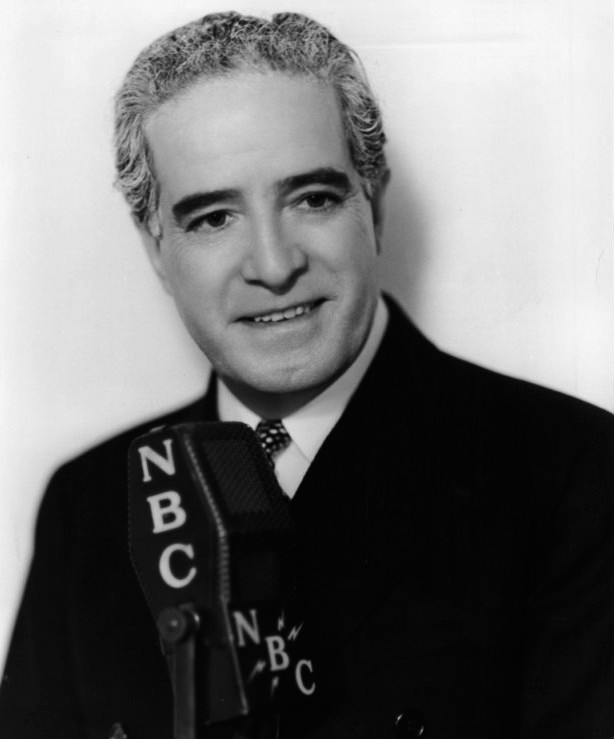
- Smythe c. 1953
- Born: Tony Svainaz; December 18, 1885; San Francisco, California, U.S.
- Died: March 20, 1966, age 80; Hollywood, California, U.S.
- Education: St. Ignatius College
- Occupation: Actor

J. Anthony Smythe (born Tony Svainaz; December 18, 1885 - March 20, 1966) was an American actor. He was a matinee idol in San Francisco and other cities for 17 years before he began performing on radio.

== Early years ==
Smythe's father came from Yugoslavia and had the last name changed from Svainaz to Smith. He left Yugoslavia at age 9 and was a cabin boy at sea until he came to the United States at age 17. After he failed to find gold as a prospector, he owned a restaurant and another business in San Francisco. Smythe was born in San Francisco and graduated from St. Ignatius College there. When he became an actor, his manager changed the young man's name to Anthony Smyth. A subsequent manager changed the spelling of his last name and added the initial at the beginning.

Smythe had seven older siblings, and his father hoped that he would become a lawyer. However, he became involved with acting at St. Ignatius, having roles in productions of King John, Macbeth, and King Henry V, and his focus turned from law to theater. When Smythe graduated, his father gave him a trip to Europe with funding to spend a year there. After he returned to the United States, a friend told him about an opportunity in summer stock theater in Waterbury, Connecticut, and he joined that troupe.

== Stage ==
Smythe's early acting experience came in character roles at the Liberty and Bishop Playhouse in Oakland, California. In the early 20th century, Smythe acted in repertory theatre with the Ernest Wilkes Stock Company. He was selected from 100 applicants to be the Wilkes troupe's leading man after he had performed with the Orpheum stock company in Philadelphia and with stock players at the Marlowe Theater in Chicago and the Keith Theater in New York. He was the leading man in Oakland at the Orpheum and Liberty theaters. In 1910 and 1911 Smythe performed with the Orpheum Players at the Chestnut Street Theatre in Philadelphia. He left that group in the latter part of 1911 and moved to acting at Philadelphia's Grand Opera House. In 1913 he acted with the Temple Stock Company in Hamilton, Ontario, Canada. For two seasons, Smythe was the leading man at the Maitland Theater in San Francisco. He also acted in Vancouver, British Columbia, Canada, in the early 1920s. In Phoenix, Arizona, he was leading man with the Metropolitan Players in 1925 and with the Clement-Walsh players in 1926.

A review in the Dramatic Mirror said that Smythe and another actor "are at their best and their interpretation of the two difficult roles could not be improved upon" in a 1917 production of Outcast at the Bishop Theater in Oakland, California.

== Radio ==
Smythe's move from stage to radio occurred while a health problem caused him to be away from the theater for a time. A meeting with an executive at NBC led to Smythe's making his radio debut on Split Second Dramas. He later portrayed the cardinal on The Golden Flame. He portrayed Henry Barbour on the radio serial One Man's Family for the show's duration. Barbour was a stockbroker and father of the Barbour household. Radio historian John Dunning wrote, "The show's success was due in no small part to a magnificent 27-year run as Henry Barbour by J. Anthony Smythe. Henry simply could not have been more perfectly played." Smythe adapted memories of his father to the Barbour character. "The moment I read the first line," he said, "I thought how familiar it sounded. It was like my own father speaking ... I had slipped into the part before it I knew it and — well, Henry came to life!"

== Personal life and death ==
Smythe was a bachelor. He retired in 1959 and died at his home in Hollywood on March 20, 1966, aged 80.
