= Dick York =

American actor (1928–1992)

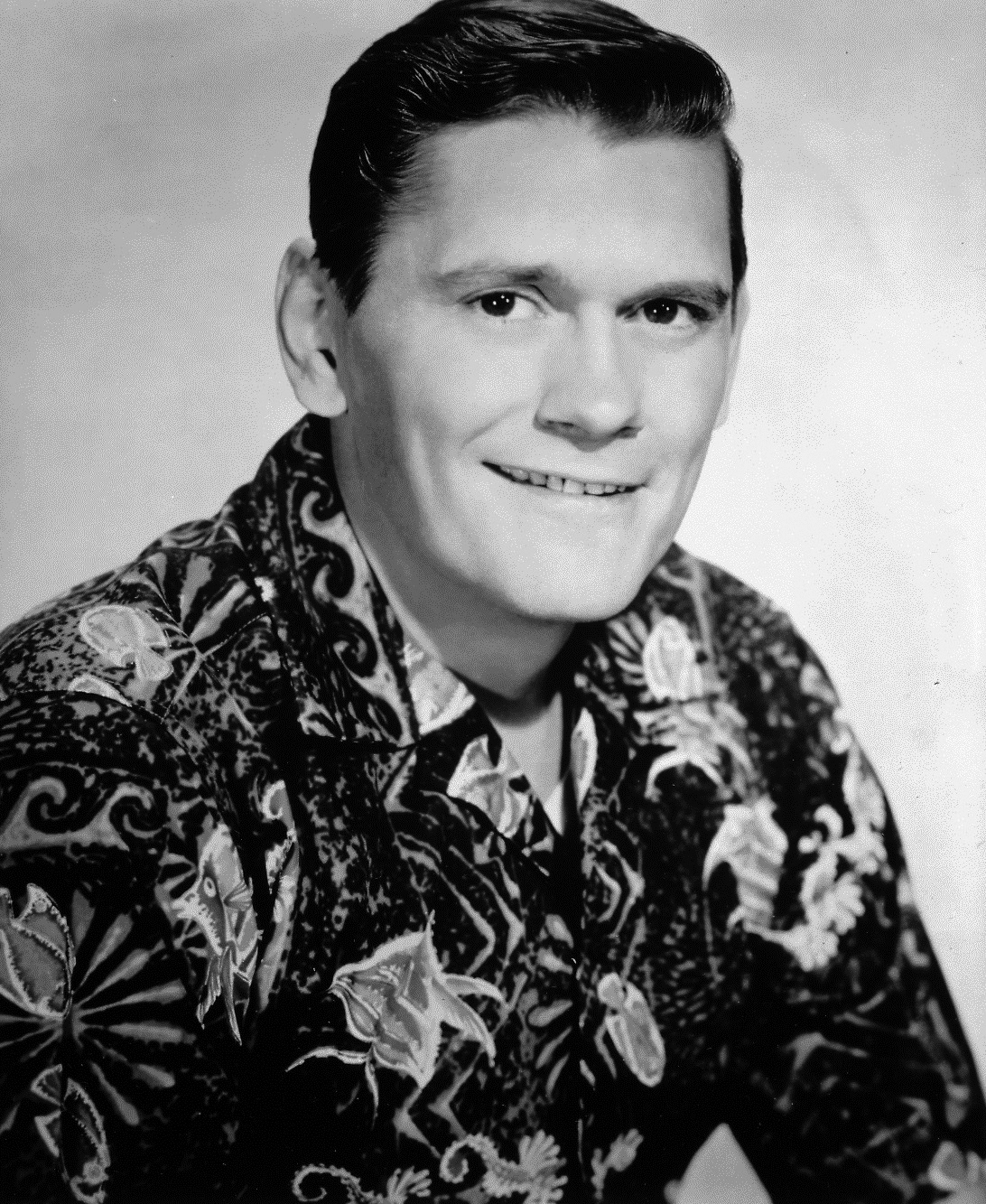
- York in 1965
- Born: Richard Allen York; September 4, 1928; Fort Wayne, Indiana, U.S.
- Died: February 20, 1992 (aged 63); East Grand Rapids, Michigan, U.S.
- Resting place: Plainfield Cemetery in Rockford, Michigan
- Occupation: Actor
- Years active: 1943–1984
- Spouse: Joan Alt (m. 1951)
- Children: 5

Richard Allen York (September 4, 1928 – February 20, 1992) was an American actor. He was the first actor to play Darrin Stephens on the sitcom Bewitched. He played teacher Bertram Cates in the film Inherit the Wind (1960).

York's career was hampered by a serious back injury he sustained while working on the film They Came to Cordura in 1959. Although his role in Bewitched was a success, he left the series in 1969 after a decline in his physical health, and he rarely acted this year. He retired from acting in the mid-1980s.

== Early life ==
He was born on September 4, 1928, in Fort Wayne, Indiana, to Bernard York, a salesman, and Betty, a seamstress. He grew up in Chicago, where a nun first recognized his vocal promise. He began his career at the age of 15 as the star of the radio program That Brewster Boy. He also appeared in hundreds of other radio shows and instructional films, and then he moved to New York City, where he acted on Broadway in Tea and Sympathy and Bus Stop. He performed with stars including Paul Muni and Joanne Woodward in live television broadcasts and with Janet Leigh, Jack Lemmon, and Glenn Ford in movies, including My Sister Eileen and Cowboy.

While filming the movie They Came to Cordura (1959), York suffered a permanent, disabling back injury. He later explained, "Gary Cooper and I were propelling a handcar carrying several 'wounded' men down [the] railroad track. I was on the bottom stroke of this sort of teeter-totter mechanism that made the handcar run. I was just lifting the handle up as the director yelled 'cut!' and one of the 'wounded' cast members reached up and grabbed the handle. Now, instead of lifting the expected weight, I was suddenly, jarringly, lifting his entire weight off the flatbed – 180 pounds (Note: 180 pounds (82 kg)) or so. The muscles along the right side of my back tore. They just snapped and let loose. And that was the start of it all." This incident left him in debilitating pain, which resulted in his being unable to continue working on Bewitched.

York's injury did not immediately end his career. In 1960, a year after his injury, York played Bertram Cates (modeled on John Thomas Scopes, known for the Monkey Trial) in the film version of Inherit the Wind.

York starred with Gene Kelly in Going My Way (1962). He was cast in the series, which lasted one season, as Tom Colwell, who operates a secular youth center.

York appeared in dozens of episodes of other television series, including Justice, Alfred Hitchcock Presents, The Alfred Hitchcock Hour, The Untouchables, Rawhide, The Americans, Wagon Train, Father Knows Best, The Twilight Zone, The Virginian, and Route 66.

== Bewitched (1964–1969) ==
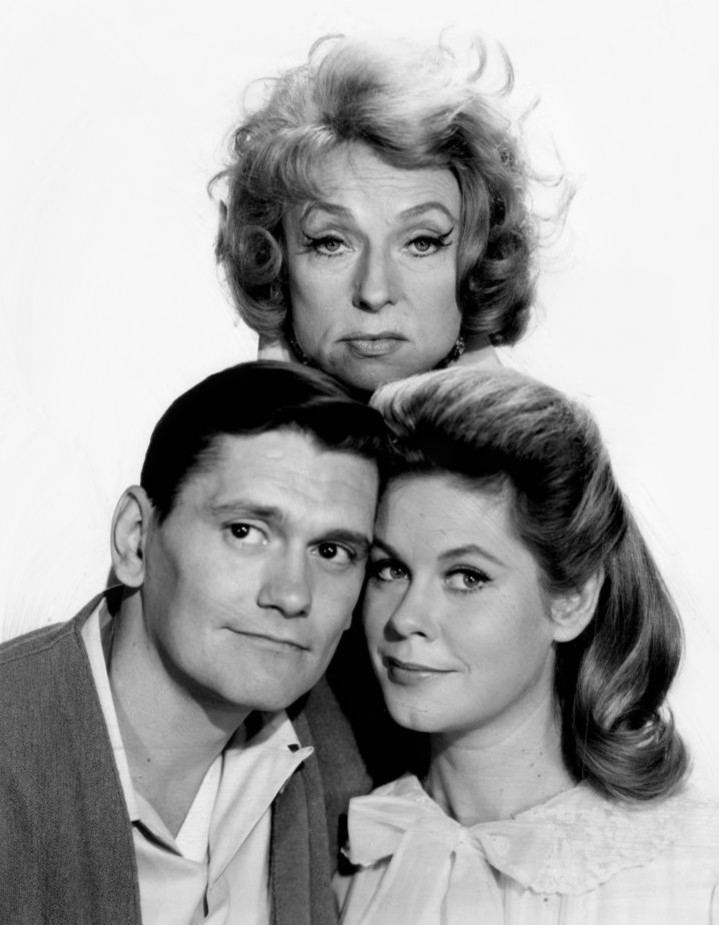
York with Bewitched co-stars Elizabeth Montgomery as Samantha Stephens (front) and Agnes Moorehead as Endora (back)

In 1964, York began playing Darrin Stephens in the sitcom Bewitched as Samantha's (Elizabeth Montgomery) mortal husband. The show was a huge success and York was nominated for an Emmy Award in 1968.

The crew built York a slanted wall on which he could lean between scenes during the first two seasons, this support allowed York to manage his back injury with little difficulty. Halfway through the third season, York's back injury was aggravated into a painful degenerative spine condition, frequently causing shooting delays and requiring assistance to walk. Because York sometimes was seized with debilitating pain, the scripts for some of his later Bewitched episodes were written and staged such that his character would be in bed or on the couch for the entire episode. York did not appear in several third- and fourth-season episodes, and his eventual departure from the show well into the filming of the fifth season necessitated episodes that focused on Samantha and other members of her family.

While filming the fifth-season episode "Daddy Does His Thing", York fell ill: "I was too sick to go on. I had a temperature of 105, (Note: 105 °F (41 °C)) full of strong antibiotics, for almost 10 days. I went to work that day, but I was sick. I lay in my dressing room after being in make-up, waiting to be called on the set. They knew I was feeling pretty rotten, and they tried to give me time to rest. I kept having chills. This was the middle of the summer and I was wearing a sheepskin jacket and I was chilling. I was shaking all over. Then, while sitting on a scaffolding with Maurice Evans, being lit for a special-effects scene: They were setting an inky – that's a little tiny [spotlight] that was supposed to be just flickering over my eyes. That flickering, flickering, flickering made me feel weird. And I'm sitting on this platform up in the air...and I turn to Gibby, a friend of mine on the set who was just down below, and I said 'Gibby, I think I have to get down.' He started to help me down and that's the last thing I remember until I woke up on the floor. That's about all I remember of the incident...and I'd managed to bite a very large hole in the side of my tongue before they could pry my teeth apart."

From York's hospital bed, he and director William Asher discussed York's future. "Do you want to quit?" Asher asked. "If it's all right with you, Billy", York said. York left the sitcom to devote himself to recovery, never to return. Dick Sargent replaced York in the role of Darrin Stephens, taking over the role at the start of the series' sixth season (1969–1970) and continuing in the part until the series ended after its eighth season (1971–1972). Sargent originally was offered the role of Darrin in 1964, but declined in favor of a part in the short-lived sitcom Broadside.

Despite the scripted antagonism between characters Darrin and his mother-in-law Endora, in reality Dick York and Agnes Moorehead enjoyed a very close friendship off screen. Moorehead was very upset when it was confirmed that York left the show.

== Later years (1969–1992) ==
For the next 18 months, York was bed-ridden in a haze of prescription painkillers. In his memoir The Seesaw Girl and Me, published posthumously, he describes the struggle to break his addiction and come to grips with the loss of his career. The book is in large part a love letter to his wife, Joan (née Alt), the girl of the title, who stuck with him through the hard times.

His chronic pain from his injury to his back was difficult for him to get through but he pushed forward. "I had a band playing in my head, bagpipes night and day," York recalled. "It just went on and on and on and on and on...The fans whisper to you, and the walls whisper to you and you look at television and sometimes it flashes in a certain way that sends you into a fit and you know that your wife has put her hand in your mouth so you won't bite off your tongue. You can't sleep. You hallucinate. I used to make a tape recording of rain so I could listen to the rain lying in bed at night to drown out those damned bagpipes."

In the early 1980s, York tried to revive his career. His latter credits were on Simon & Simon and Fantasy Island. Afterward he stopped receiving calls when his agent failed to register with the Screen Actors Guild on his behalf, and he retired from show business by 1984.

== Illness and death ==
York was a three-pack-a-day smoker for much of his life and often smoked cigarettes on the set of Bewitched; he spent his final years battling emphysema. By 1989, he was using an oxygen tank to help him breathe. While bedridden at home in his Rockford, Michigan, he founded Acting for Life, a private charity to help the homeless and others in need. Using his telephone as his pulpit, York motivated politicians, business people, and general public to contribute supplies and money.

Despite his suffering, York said "I've been blessed. I have no complaints. I've been surrounded by people in radio, on stage, and in motion pictures and television who love me. The things that have gone wrong have been simply physical things."

York died of complications from emphysema at Blodgett Hospital in East Grand Rapids, Michigan, on February 20, 1992, at age 63. He is buried at Plainfield Cemetery in Rockford, Michigan.

== Filmography ==
Film
Year	Title	Role	Notes
1945	Insomnia (Combat Fatigue: Insomnia)	Lucky	uncredited, short film for U.S. Navy
1947	Shy Guy	Philip Norton	short
1949	Rest and Health	George	short
1950	Last Date	Nick	short, driver's education film. credited as Richard York
1951	How Friendly Are You?	Phil	short
1955	My Sister Eileen	Ted 'Wreck' Loomis	
1955	Three Stripes in the Sun	Corporal Neeby Muhlendorf	
1957	Operation Mad Ball	Corporal Bohun	
1958	Cowboy	Charlie, Trailhand	
1959	The Last Blitzkrieg	Sergeant Ludwig	
1959	They Came to Cordura	Private Renziehausen	
1960	Inherit the Wind	Bertram T. Cates	
2005	Bewitched	Darrin Stephens	uncredited, archive footage
Television
Year	Title	Role	Notes
1953	Omnibus	Nick	Episode: "The Battler"
1955	Goodyear Television Playhouse	John Randolph	Episode: "Visit to a Small Planet"
1955	The Philco Television Playhouse	Andy	Episode: "Incident in July"
1955	Justice		Episode: "Fatal Payment"
1955–1957	Kraft Television Theatre		Episode: "Million Dollar Rookie; Episode: "Mock Trial"; Episode: "Ride into Danger"
1956	Playwrights '56	Grayson	Episode: "Honor"
1956	Eye on New York	Lieutenant Mac Hartman	Episode: "Night of the Auk"
1956–1958	Studio One	George Fox; George Weston; Captain Jay Hellman	Episode: "A Man's World"; Episode: "The Weston Strain"; Episode: "The Enemy Within"
1958	Father Knows Best	Tom Wentworth	Episode: "Betty, The Pioneer Woman"
1957	The Kaiser Aluminum Hour	Edward Gillis	Episode: "A Real Fine Cutting Edge"
1957–1963	Alfred Hitchcock Presents	(1) Manny Coe (2) Norman Logan (3) J.J. Bunce (4) Ralph Jones (5) Tom Barton (6) Herbert J. Wiggam	Season 2 Episode 29: "Vicious Circle" (1957) as (1); Season 4 Episode 33: "The Dusty Drawer" (1959) as (2); Season 5 Episode 8: "The Blessington Method" (1959) as (3); Season 6 Episode 2: "The Doubtful Doctor" (1960) as (4); Season 7 Episode 7: "You Can't Be a Little Girl All Your Life" (1961) as (5); Season 7 Episode 34: "The Twelve Hour Caper" (1962) as (6)
1958	The United States Steel Hour	Gordon Bates	Episode: "Beaver Patrol"
1958	Climax!	Gordon Bates	Episode: "Shooting for the Moon"
1958–1959	Playhouse 90	Scott Arlen; Tom; Matthew Sherwood	Episode: "The Last Clear Chance"; Episode: "The Time of Your Life"; Episode: "Made in Japan"; Episode: "Out of Dust"
1958, 1960	The Millionaire	Ken Leighton; Sandy Newell	Episode: "The Ken Leighton Story"; Episode: "Millionaire Sandy Newell"
1960	The Untouchables	Ernie Torrance	Season 1 Episode 22: "The White Slavers"
1960	Alcoa Theatre	Corporal James Sloan	Episode: "The Glorious Fourth"
1960	Stagecoach West	Webb Crawford	Episode: "Three Wise Men"
1960–1961	The Twilight Zone	Captain Phil Riker; Hector Poole	Episode: "The Purple Testament"; Episode: "A Penny for Your Thoughts"
1961	Naked City	Charles Colano	Episode: "Bullets Cost Too Much"
1961	The DuPont Show with June Allyson	Lieutenant James Whitney	Episode: "School of the Soldier"
1961	The Americans	Bolick	Episode: "The War Between the States"
1961	General Electric Theater	Ashael Miller	Episode: "A Musket for Jessica"
1961	Adventures in Paradise	Markham Jones	Episode: "The Reluctant Hero"
1961	Outlaws	Sam Nichols	Episode: "Night Riders"
1961	Dr. Kildare	Harry Benton	Episode: "The Lonely Ones"
1961	Frontier Circus	Jeb Randall	Episode: "The Shaggy Kings"
1961, 1963	Rawhide	Frank Price; Elwood P. Gilroy	S3:E11, "Incident of the Broken Word"; Episode: "Incident at Confidence Creek"
1961–1964	Wagon Train	Willie Pettigrew; Charley Shutup; Ben Mitchell	Episode: "The Clementine Jones Story"; Episode: "The Charley Shutup Story"; Episode: "The Michael Malone Story"
1962	Thriller	Fred Bancroft	Episode: "The Incredible Doktor Markesan"
1962–1963	Going My Way	Tom Colwell	
1963	Insight		Episode: "Breakthrough"
1963	Route 66	Lieutenant School	Episode: "What a Shining Young Man Was Our Gallant Lieutenant"
1963	The Alfred Hitchcock Hour	Sheriff Will Pearce	Season 2 Episode 3: "Terror at Northfield"
1963	The Virginian	Jeff Tolliver	Episode: "Stopover in a Western Town"
1964–1969	Bewitched	Darrin Stephens	Main role; 5 seasons
1965	The Flintstones	Darrin Stephens (voice)	Season 6 Episode 6: "Samantha"
1983	Simon & Simon	Martin Donlevy	Season 3 Episode 9: "Too Much of a Good Thing"
1984	Fantasy Island	Mr. Sutton	Season 7 Episode 11: "Games People Play" / "The Sweet Life"

== Book ==
- York, Dick. The Seesaw Girl and Me (New Path Press, 2004), published posthumously.

== Awards and nominations ==
Emmy Awards

- 1968: Nominated, Outstanding Continued Performance by an Actor in a Leading Role in a Comedy Series for Bewitched
