= Great Moments in History =

Dramatic radio series broadcast in 1927–28

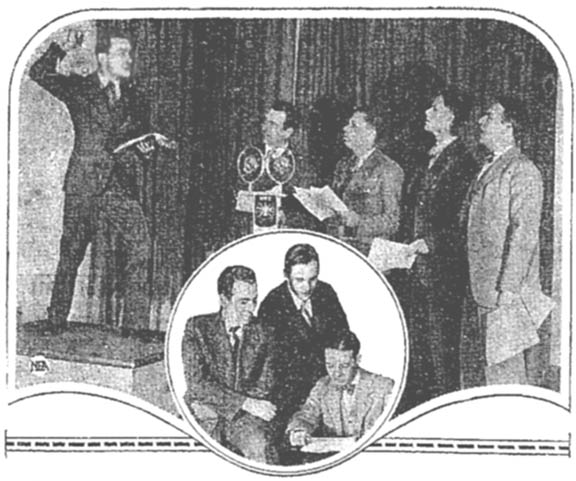
Actors during broadcast of NBC's Great Moments in History with John Knight (far left) portraying Alexander Hamilton

Great Moments in History was a dramatic radio series broadcast on NBC in 1927–28. It offered recreations of famed historical situations.

The program was the creation of actor-director Gerald Stoop, a New York Theater Guild member, and playwright Henry Fisk Carlton, an English instructor at New York University and a graduate of Harvard's Dramatic Work Shop. Carlton was previously involved in the production of other NBC programs, including Re-told Tales and House of Myths.

The series featured major figures of history, such as Alexander Hamilton. One show in the series, "Paul Revere's Ride", employed this dialogue:

REVERE: That you, John Hancock?
HANCOCK: Yes, Paul Revere, what's the matter?
REVERE: Matter enough, Hancock. The Redcoats are coming. Is Sam Adams in the house with you?
HANCOCK: Yes, Paul Revere, what's me. Oh, Sam–Sam Adams!
ADAMS: Yes, yes, I'm coming.

Carlton felt every aspect had to be dramatized with elaborate details, as he explained, "To make your audience see, it is necessary to make your characters describe what they see."

Carlton has been credited (along with William Ford Manley and one John Harwood) with joint authorship of the dramatic play Shooting Shadows.
