= They Came to Cordura =

1959 film by Robert Rossen

- Theatrical release poster
- Directed by: Robert Rossen
- Screenplay by: Ivan Moffat; Robert Rossen
- Based on: the novel by Glendon Swarthout
- Produced by: William Goetz
- Starring: Gary Cooper; Rita Hayworth; Van Heflin; Tab Hunter; Dick York
- Cinematography: Burnett Guffey
- Edited by: William A. Lyon
- Music by: Elie Siegmeister
- Production companies: Goetz Pictures; Baroda Productions
- Distributed by: Columbia Pictures
- Release date: October 1, 1959
- Running time: 123 minutes
- Country: United States
- Language: English
- Budget: $4.5 million
- Box office: $2.5 million (est. US/ Canada rentals)

They Came to Cordura is a 1959 American Western film co-written and directed by Robert Rossen and starring Gary Cooper, Rita Hayworth, Van Heflin and Tab Hunter. It was based on a 1958 novel by Glendon Swarthout.

== Plot ==
Gary Cooper and Rita Hayworth in They Came to Cordura

In 1916, as U.S. soldiers chase after Pancho Villa, Army Major Thomas Thorn is assigned to be a battlefield observer and reward heroism. He has been suggested for this duty by Colonel Rogers, who is 63 years old and impatiently yearning to be promoted to general before mandatory retirement a few months hence.

Rogers leads his regiment in an old-fashioned but poorly planned cavalry charge on Ojos Azules, a villa owned by Adelaide Geary where Villa's men withdrew after a victory over Mexican government troops, enjoying her hospitality. Thorn, excused from the fighting, observes through his binoculars various acts of heroism by Lieutenant Fowler, Sergeant Chawk, Corporal Trubee and Private Renziehausen in defeating Villa's men.

Rogers is proud of having personally led the charge, but furious when Thorn will not nominate him for a citation. Thorn insists that leading his regiment in the charge was "in the line of duty" and refuses to consider a citation for the Medal of Honor, awarded for heroism "above and beyond the call of duty." Rogers reminds Thorn that he protected him from an investigation for cowardice, which he did out of respect for Thorn's father, but that does not sway Thorn.

Thorn intends to recommend the four soldiers for the Medal of Honor. He is ordered to take along Mrs. Geary, who is charged with "giving aid and comfort to the enemy." Private Andrew Hetherington, nominated by Thorn for a medal after an earlier battle, rides with them to the expedition's base at the Texas town of Cordura.

This seemingly simple task becomes increasingly complex as the incessant squabbling between Thorn and the men threatens to destroy them all. Eager to learn more about their acts of bravery, Thorn finds the men to be hostile toward him. A series of harrowing incidents make it clear that the apparent heroes were motivated by ambition, terror, or chance, while it is the disgraced Thorn who possesses moral courage. The men soon become insubordinate, ultimately turning against Thorn and forcing him to fight the soldiers to save his own life. The movie ends with the men learning personal, not physical, courage from Thorn's example.

== Cast ==
- Gary Cooper as Major Thomas Thorn
- Rita Hayworth as Adelaide Geary
- Van Heflin as Sgt. John Chawk
- Tab Hunter as Lt. William Fowler
- Richard Conte as Cpl. Milo Trubee
- Michael Callan as Pvt. Andrew Hetherington
- Dick York as Pvt. Renziehausen
- Robert Keith as Col. Rogers
- Carlos Romero as Arreaga
- James Bannon as Capt. Paltz
- Edward Platt as Col. DeRose
- Maurice Jara as Mexican Federale
- Sam Buffington as First Correspondent
- Arthur Hanson as Second Correspondent

== Production ==
The film was William Goetz's second film in a six-picture deal for Columbia after Me and the Colonel.

With a budget of $4.5 million it was one of Columbia's most expensive films at the time. It was the first movie for Michael Callan under his contract to the studio.

Parts of the film were shot at Snow Canyon and Harrisburg in Utah as well as Indio, California.

A March 1959 Variety article announced that the film would be a "roadshow" release, with a three-hour runtime and special overture and entr'acte music from composer Elie Siegmeister.

=== Screenplay ===
Author Glendon Swarthout got the idea for his novel after he had obtained eyewitness accounts for Medal of Honor citations while serving with the 3rd Infantry Division in Southern France during World War II. This personal experience was applied to his novel.

=== Filming ===
Dick York suffered a severe back injury during filming that caused him great pain in his later years, so much so that he was forced to resign from his longtime role of Darrin Stephens on the 1960s television program Bewitched, the injury indeed almost ruining his life. In York's own words, "Gary Cooper and I were propelling a handcar carrying several 'wounded' men down [the] railroad track. I was on the bottom stroke of this sort of teeter-totter mechanism that made the handcar run. I was just lifting the handle up as the director yelled 'cut!' and one of the 'wounded' cast members reached up and grabbed the handle. I was suddenly, jarringly, lifting his entire weight off the flatbed—one hundred and eighty pounds [82 kilograms] or so. The muscles along the right side of my back tore. They just snapped and let loose. And that was the start of it all: the pain, the painkillers, the addiction, the lost career."

=== Music ===
A film tie-in song written by Sammy Cahn and Jimmy Van Heusen was recorded by Frank Sinatra and Robert Horton. It was composer Elie Siegmeister's only Hollywood film score.
