= America Dances =

- Genre: Music
- Country of origin: United States
- Language(s): English

America Dances is a radio program that presented various orchestras on the NBC Red Network on Saturday evenings beginning in 1935. It was promoted with the line, "Swing from coast to coast."

William Conrad was the announcer. Orchestras and musicians featured included Lee Gordon's dance band, the Frank Hodek Orchestra, Fats Waller and Gene Krupa.
