= Carlton E. Morse =

American screenwriter

- Born: Carlton E. Morse; June 4, 1901; Jennings, Louisiana
- Died: May 24, 1993, (age 91); Sacramento, California
- Occupation: Writer
- Spouse(s): Patricia Pattison De Ball; Mildred Morse

Carlton Errol Morse (June 4, 1901 - May 24, 1993) was a Louisiana-born producer/journalist best known for his creation of the radio serial One Man's Family, which debuted in 1932 and ran until 1959 as one of the most popular as well as long-running radio soap operas of the time. He also was responsible for the radio serial I Love a Mystery. A radio legend, he experimented with television and published three novels. Morse is considered by many to be one of the best radio scriptwriters.

== Early life ==
In 1901, Carlton was born in Jennings, Louisiana, to George A. and Ora Morse. He had two brothers. In 1906, his family relocated to a fruit ranch at Talent, Oregon, and when Morse was 16, they moved to a walnut ranch near Sacramento, California. Morse attended Sacramento High School, where he played basketball and wrote for the school newspaper. After graduating from high school, he attended Sacramento Junior College, where he played basketball. Morse went to the University of California from 1919 to 1922 but did not graduate. Instead, he dropped out and returned to Sacramento, beginning a career as a journalist with the Sacramento Union.

== Journalism career ==
From 1922 to 1928, Morse was employed at the Sacramento Union, the San Francisco Illustrated Daily Herald, The Seattle Times, Vancouver Columbian, Portland Oregonian and The San Francisco Bulletin. When the Bulletin was absorbed into the San Francisco Call in 1929, Morse lost his job, soon after marrying his first wife, Patricia DeBall. Though The Seattle Times offered him another job, he declined. This was to mark the beginning of his career in radio.

== Radio ==
After losing his newspaper job, Morse brought several scripts he had written throughout the 1920s to an interview with NBC. He soon was offered a job at KGO, the San Francisco outlet of NBC's Blue Network, and began his radio career scripting House of Myths. Morse began work on NBC Mystery Serial, which included such episodes as "Captain Post: Crime Specialist" and "Case of the One-eyed Parrot". Other mysteries scripted by Morse included The Witch of Endor, The City of the Dead, Captain Post: Crime Specialist, The Game Called Murder and Dead Men Prowl.

He also did four programs based on San Francisco Police Department files: Chinatown Squad, Barbary Coast Nights, Killed in Action and To the Best of Their Ability. Morse worked closely with San Francisco Police Chief William J. Quinn, who narrated all four series.

Morse's major successes were One Man's Family, and I Love a Mystery. One Man's Family began in 1932, with I Love A Mystery following in 1939. The two series were almost polar opposites; "One Man's Family" was a daily soap opera, targeted at housewives, and "I Love a Mystery" was an adventure serial for adolescents and lovers of the macabre. Both are regarded by radio historians as two of the all-time best radio serials.

I Love a Mystery was a tremendous hit and many episodes still offer chills to modern listeners. The original series was broadcast from 1939 to 1942 on the NBC Blue Network and then had one more season (1943–44) on CBS. It was later revived on the Mutual Broadcasting System from 1949 through 1953. The original run was broadcast from Hollywood, and the revival originated from New York City.

Morse created and wrote the soap opera Family Skeleton, which ran on CBS radio in 1953–1954.

=== Additional radio credits ===
- Chinatown Tales
- Musical Miniatures
- Illustrated Tales
- Split Second Tales
- House of Myths
- Adventures by Morse
- I Love Adventure (adaptations of stories from "I Love a Mystery")
- His Honor the Barber
- The Family Skeleton

== Television ==
Morse was also a pioneer in television as well. He was part of Slice of Life, the first television drama series aired on Los Angeles' television station, KFI. Morse brought One Man's Family to television (1949–52), years before it left the airwaves with the end of the Golden Age of Radio.

Morse brought a revision of Slice of Life to network television with the title Mixed Doubles. He was producer, director, and writer for the situation comedy, which ran on NBC August through October in 1949. He also had an unsuccessful soap opera, Kitty Foyle in 1958.

== Personal life ==
Morse married Patricia Pattison De Ball in 1928.

== Later life ==
Morse eventually retired from radio/TV in order to write novels from his home, named Seven Stones. Three of his books, Killer at the Wheel, A Lavish of Sin and Stuff the Lady's Hatbox were based on I Love a Mystery. In 1984, Morse's first wife Patricia died. Later in life, Morse copyrighted his scripts and novels. He was a member of San Francisco's Bohemian Club, and he attended many conventions held in his honor. Before his death in 1993, Morse founded the Morse Family Trust. He is survived by his second wife, Millie Morse.

== Recognition ==
Morse has a star in the Radio section of the Hollywood Walk of Fame; it is located in front of 6445 Hollywood Boulevard.

== Papers ==
The Library of Congress houses the Carlton Morse Copyright Script Collection. Located in the library's Recorded Sound Section of the Motion Picture, Broadcasting and Recorded Sound Division, the collection includes 47 scripts from I Love a Mystery, four scripts from Adventures by Morse, and 13 scripts from I Love Adventure.

Additional items related to Morse are available in the Carlton E. Morse Collection at the City of Thousand Oaks Library in Thousand Oaks, California. The collection includes scripts from Morse's radio and television series as well as other documents and memorabilia.

== See also ==
- List of Bohemian Club members
