= Billy and Betty =

American radio children's adventure series

Billy and Betty is a 15-minute children's adventure radio series that began broadcasting on radio station WEAF on March 25, 1935. It moved to the NBC Red Network in 1935. Sponsored by Sheffield Farms Grade A Milk, it was usually heard at 6:45pm on weekday afternoons.

== Characters and story ==
Dave Gudebrod and Robert Sloane directed the series. The storyline followed a brother and sister, Billy and Betty White, and their friend Melvin Castlebury as they encountered adventures. The cast included Audrey Egan and James McCallion (1918-1991), who also portrayed Skeezix on the Gasoline Alley radio program. Elliott Reid portrayed Castleberry. Kelvin Keech was the announcer.

In December 1935, the Child Study Association of America reported that radio programs for children showed "distinct evidence of efforts to improve the radio's offerings along the lines demanded by an increasingly informed public." Programs approved by the Child Study Association of America included The Singing Lady, Popeye the Sailor and Billy and Betty. Billy and Betty was one of 13 children's broadcasts included on the Women's National Radio Committee's approved list in 1936.

Sponsors included Wheaties and Kix. Writers included Leonardo Bercovici.

The Christmas Adventure of Billy and Betty was a 1941 Victor-Bluebird recording.
