= Campus Revue =

American radio music program

- Country of origin: United States
- Language: English
- Home station: NBC
- Hosted by: Hal Totten
- Original release: October 4, 1935
- Sponsored by: Elgin National Watch Company

Art Kassel and His Kassels in the Air Orchestra with vocalist Gloria Hart

Campus Revue, a.k.a. NBC Campus Revue, was a radio music program broadcast on NBC in the mid-1930s. It was heard on Friday nights at 10:30 p.m. beginning October 4, 1935. Because the show's sponsor was the Elgin National Watch Company, the title was sometimes announced as Elgin Campus Revue.

== Mills Brothers ==
The featured performers were the Mills Brothers, the first African-Americans to have a network show on radio. Writing about "Sepia singers and musicians" in the California Eagle (November 25, 1935), Charles Isaac Bowen commented:

At the present time there is only one Negro group on big time, that is a regular network commercial program and they are the Mills Brothers, the mainstays of the Elgin Watch company. They air out in the Campus Revue coming from Chicago over NBC each Friday night. The boys were signed for a quarter-year contract which has yet another month to go.

With the illness of John Mills Jr., the oldest of the four brothers, his father, John Mills Sr., stepped in as a substitute beginning with the premiere program. Vocalist Grace Dunn also appeared on Campus Revue, along with Art Kassel and his Kassels in the Air Orchestra. NBC sports commentator Hal Totten was the announcer.

On their second show, the Mills Brothers sang "Limehouse Blues", "Moanin'" and "What's the Reason?"
