= Rising Musical Stars =

American musical radio program

Rising Musical Stars was a musical radio program broadcast by NBC on Sunday nights at 10pm for a half year (1937–38). It was sometimes listed as Rising Stars. It followed Manhattan Merry-Go-Round and The American Album of Familiar Music, and this trio of programs brought the weekend to a close with 90 minutes of Sunday evening concerts.

The series was brought to the air by the National Dairy Products Corporation to promote their Sealtest brand. The program featured Alexander Smallens and His Orchestra. The program of January 30, 1938, showcased the piano duo of Hannah Klein and Paula Gilbert playing "Scherzo".

Radio historian Jim Cox found this short-lived show "unimpressive". However, at the fourth annual luncheon meeting of the Women's National Radio Committee, it received a commendation as "best program of serious music commercially sponsored," along with the Detroit Symphony and Philadelphia Orchestra concerts and the Metropolitan Opera broadcasts.
