= Old Gold on Broadway =

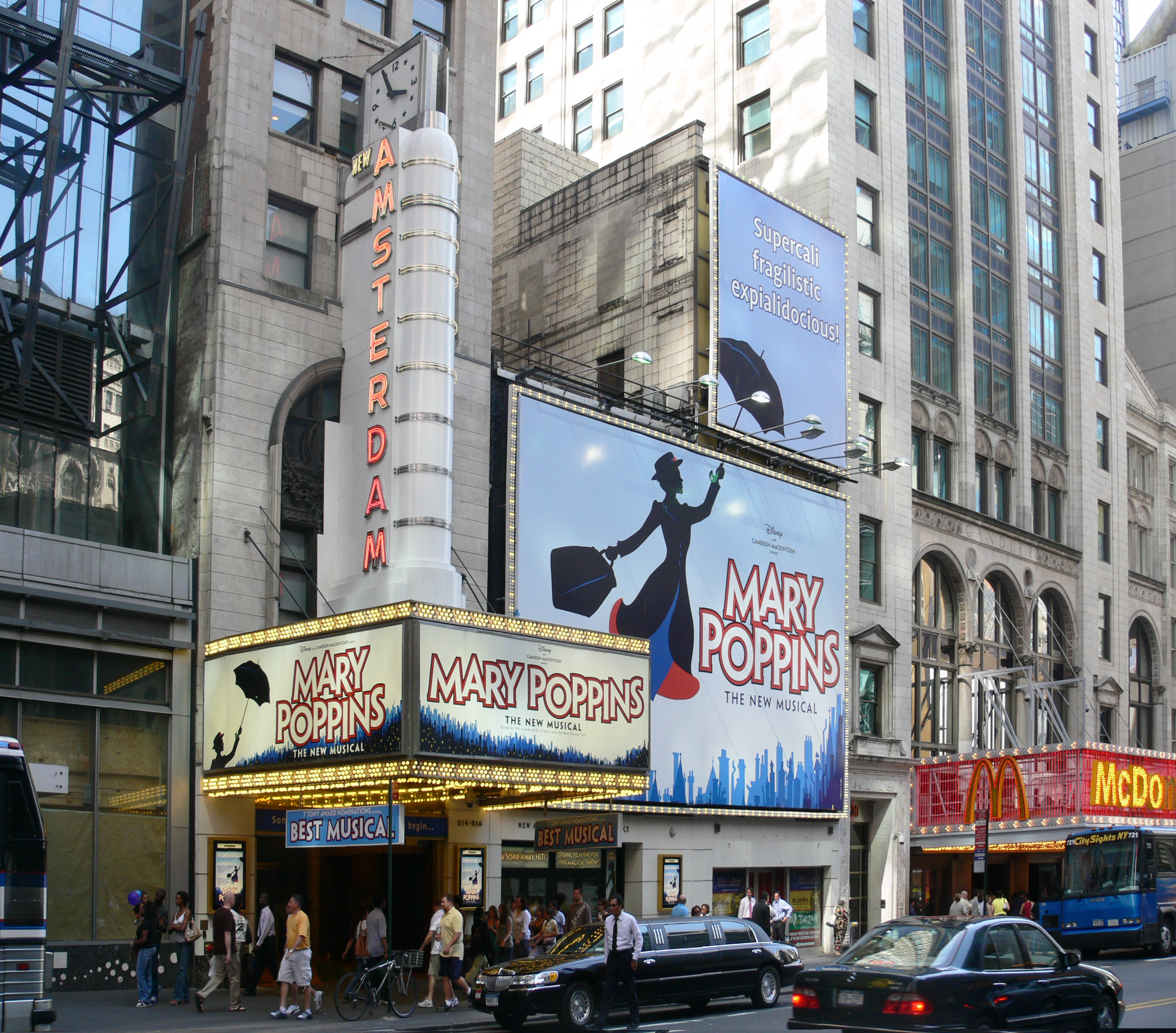
New Amsterdam Theatre

Old Gold on Broadway was a 1927–28 radio series which, beginning in October 1927, broadcast live from inside New York theaters, sponsored by Old Gold Cigarettes.

In one of the earliest programs, an excerpt from the Ziegfeld Follies with Eddie Cantor was heard directly from the stage of the New Amsterdam Theatre. The program featured a "welcome home" to New York City's Mayor, James J. Walker. The show aired on WEAF and four other radio stations.

On October 22, 1927, the entire second act of My Princess was broadcast from the stage of the Shubert Theater, and the second act of the Shubert production of The Love Call was broadcast in November 1927.

== See also ==
- Capitol Theatre
