= Capitol Theatre (New York City) =

Theater in Manhattan, New York (1919–68)

The Capitol Theatre
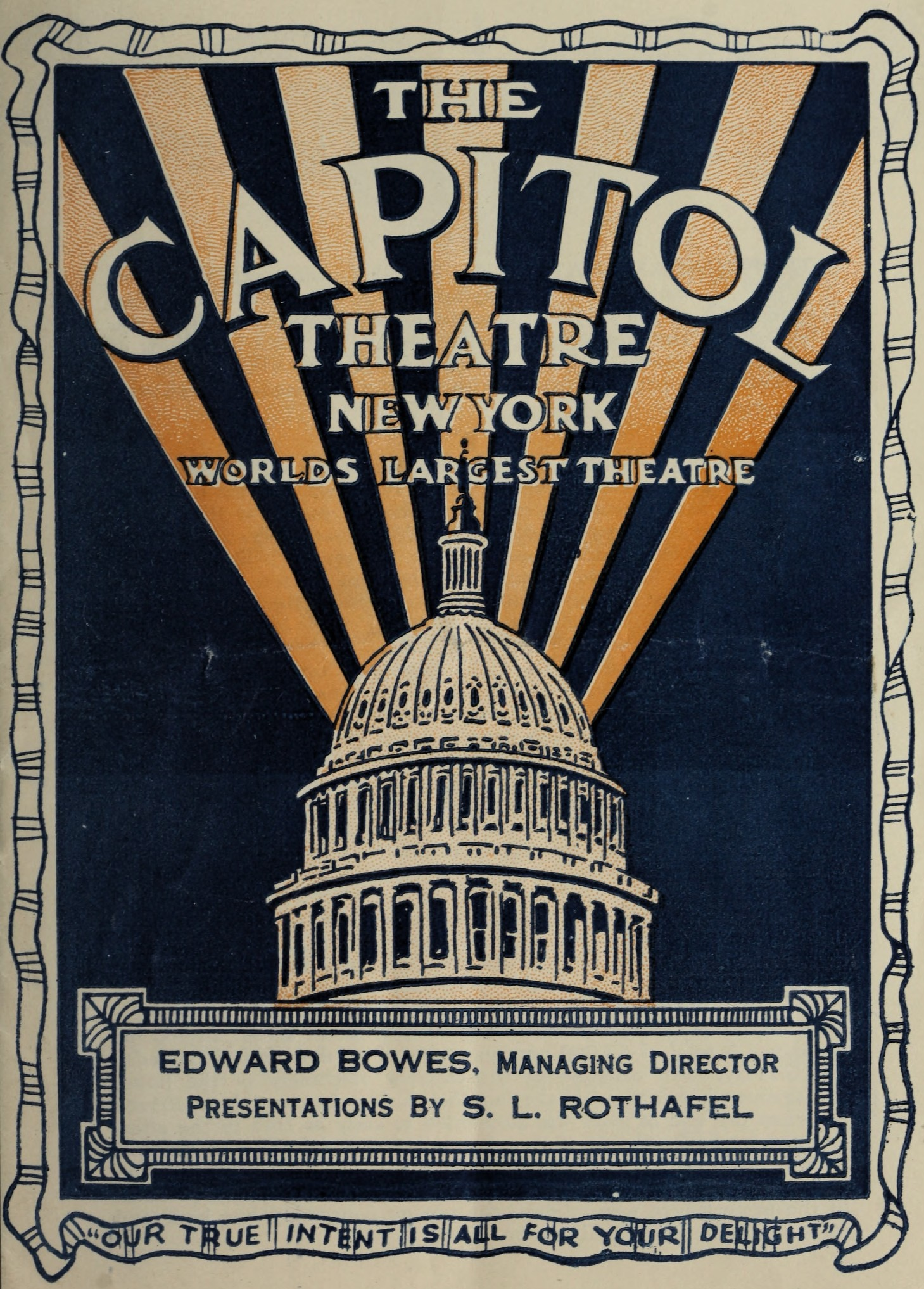
- Capitol Theatre program (1922), mentioning Edward Bowes and S. L. Rothafel, manager and producer.
- Interactive map of The Capitol Theatre
- Address: 1645 Broadway; New York City; United States
- Coordinates: 40.76195°N 73.9839°W
- Owner: Moredall Reality Company and Loews Theatres
- Capacity: 5,230
- Type: Movie palace

Construction
- Opened: October 24, 1919
- Closed: September 16, 1968
- Demolished: 1968
- Years active: 1919–1968
- Architect: Thomas W. Lamb

The Capitol Theatre was a movie palace located at 1645 Broadway, just north of Times Square in New York City, across from the Winter Garden Theatre. Designed by theater architect Thomas W. Lamb, the Capitol originally had a seating capacity of 5,230 and opened October 24, 1919. After 1924 the flagship theatre of the Loews Theatres chain, the Capitol was known as the premiere site of many Metro-Goldwyn-Mayer (MGM) films. The Capitol was also noted for presenting live musical revues and many jazz and swing bands on its stage.

== History ==
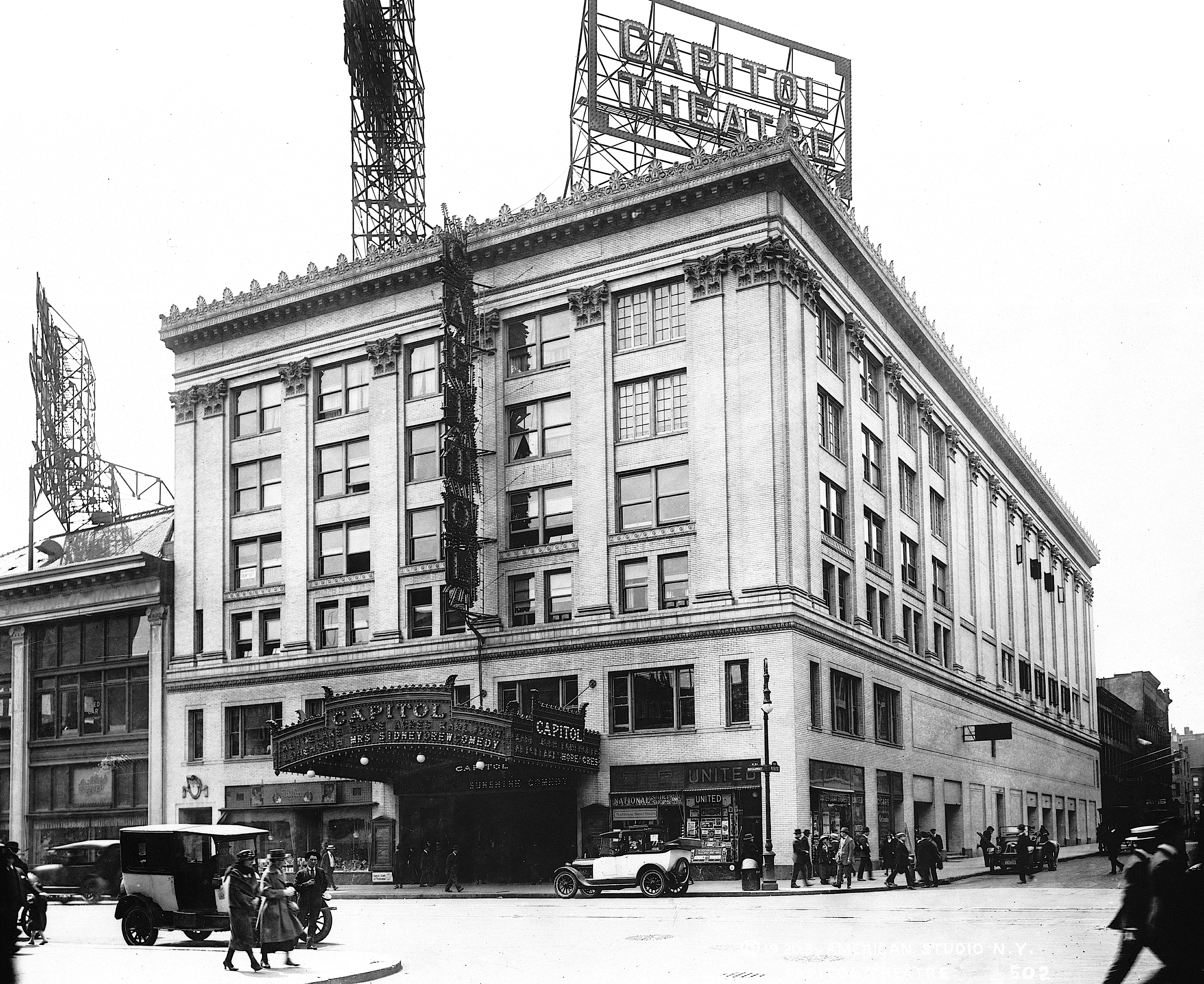
The Capitol Theatre in 1920

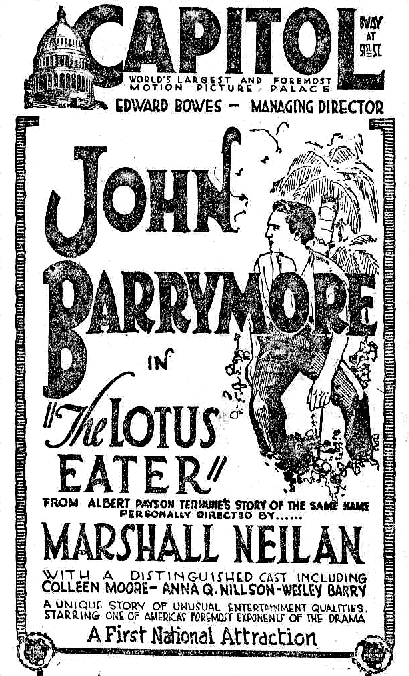
Newspaper ad for the film The Lotus Eater (1921) at the Capitol, "The world's largest and foremost motion picture palace"

The Capitol was one of the first of the large lavish movie theaters that dominated the film exhibition business for the next 40 years, built by Messmore Kendall as one of New York's first cinema palaces, through his realty company, Moredall Realty Company.

It opened on October 24, 1919 with the New York premiere of United Artists' first production, His Majesty, the American. In the early 1920s the theater was the home of Samuel Roxy Rothafel's "Roxy Gang" of singers which would perform concerts with the Capitol Theatre Orchestra which were broadcast live on the radio. The theater was acquired in 1924 by the entertainment magnate Marcus Loew and became the flagship of his deluxe Loew's Theatres chain.

The Capitol was the frequent site of the world premieres of films made by the Loew's-owned Metro-Goldwyn-Mayer studio. The Wizard of Oz (1939) had its first New York run at the theatre. Jerry Lewis started as an usher at the theatre.

After having been converted for the presentation of Cinerama wide screen films in 1962, the theater's last engagement was MGM's 2001: A Space Odyssey, which opened on April 3, 1968. The Capitol closed September 16, 1968, with a live all-star benefit featuring Bob Hope and Johnny Carson. The theatre was replaced by the Uris Building (now Paramount Plaza) office tower.

== Radio ==
Airing for the first time in November 1922, The Capitol Theatre Family Show was a 45–60 minute program, eventually broadcast Mondays on the NBC Blue Network March 7, 1927 – July 27, 1931.

Leo Zeitlin (1884–1930) was a violinist, violist, conductor and impresario who was active in Saint Petersburg's Society for Jewish Folk Music. In 1923, he emigrated to New York, where he became the violist and arranger for the Capitol Theatre. In 1925, he began arranging orchestral and small ensemble pieces for the Capitol's radio program on WEAF, which became the flagship station of the NBC Radio Network in 1926.

Beginning in 1926, the series of light classical concerts titled Capitol Theatre was broadcast by the NBC Red Network on Sunday evenings from 7:20pm to 9:15pm. This series continued until 1929, not long before Zeitlin's death.

== See also ==
- Old Gold on Broadway
