= The High-Jinkers =

Musical variety radio program broadcast

The High-Jinkers was a musical variety radio program broadcast during the late 1920s on New York's WEAF each Saturday evening at 7:30pm.

One of the featured performers was blind tenor Guy Hunter who accompanied himself at the piano. Born in 1886, Hunter was one of the first performers to start singing into a microphone. Hunter recalled:

One of my first jobs was pianist in one of William Fox's first New York theaters, a little place up on 125th Street. I played there for $12 a week. Then I sang illustrated songs for three years.

When other members of the cast were performing, Hunter sat in a corner of the studio, keeping time with his foot, until the small boy he employed as his guide would lead him to the piano. Hunter often sang songs in dialect.
