= Arco Birthday Party =

American radio musical program (1930–1931)

Arco Birthday Party (aka Arco Birthday Hour and Birthday Party) is an NBC Red Network series heard in 1930–31. It was sponsored by the American Radiator Company.

The format honored the birthdays of past writers and composers. For instance, the program of Thursday, November 13, 1930, offered a tribute to the writer Robert Louis Stevenson, who was born November 13, 1850.

That same evening the musical offerings included a male quartet harmonizing on "When You and I Were Young, Maggie" and tenor Harold Hansen singing "Roses of Picardy". The orchestra performed the "Polovetzian Dance No.1" from Alexander Borodin's Prince Igor. Borodin was born November 12, 1833.

The show featured the Arcola Rondoliers; its host was Charles K. Field.
