= That Brewster Boy =

American radio situation comedy (1941–1945)

- Genre: Situation comedy
- Country of origin: United States
- Language(s): English
- Syndicates: NBC; CBS
- Starring: Eddie Firestone, Jr. Arnold Stang; Dick York
- Announcer: Marvin Miller
- Written by: Louis Scofield
- Directed by: Owen Vinson
- Original release: September 8, 1941 – March 2, 1945
- Sponsored by: Quaker Oats

That Brewster Boy is an American old-time radio situation comedy. It was broadcast on NBC from September 8, 1941, to March 2, 1942, and on CBS from March 4, 1942, to March 2, 1945. It was also carried on 13 stations in Canada.

== Overview ==
That Brewster Boy focused on Jim and Jane Brewster (a prominent couple in a small town), their mischievous son, Joey, and their teenage daughter, Nancy. Joey often found himself in trouble that had been instigated by his friend Chuck. Other characters who were often heard were Phil Hayworth (Nancy's boyfriend), Herbert Clark (who was also fond of Nancy) and Miss Edmond (Joey's English teacher). Quaker Oats sponsored the program on both networks.

A review of the premiere episode in the trade publication Billboard praised the actors and the overall program, saying, "Script is excellently written and capably interpreted and abounds in clever comedy."

== Personnel ==
Characters and Cast
Character	Actor
Joey Brewster	Eddie Firestone, Jr. Arnold Stang; Dick York
Jim Brewster	Hugh Studebaker
Jane Brewster	Constance Crowder
Nancy Brewster	Louise Fitch; Patricia Dunlap
Phil Hayworth	Bob Bailey
Herbert Clark	Bob Jellison
Chuck	Billy Idelson
Miss Edmond	Ruth Perrott
Evelyn	Norma Jean Ross

Marvin Miller was the announcer, and Glenn Welty provided the music. Owen Vinson was the director, while Louis Scofield and Pauline Hopkins were writers.
