= The Hoover Sentinels =

1927-1935 radio concerts series

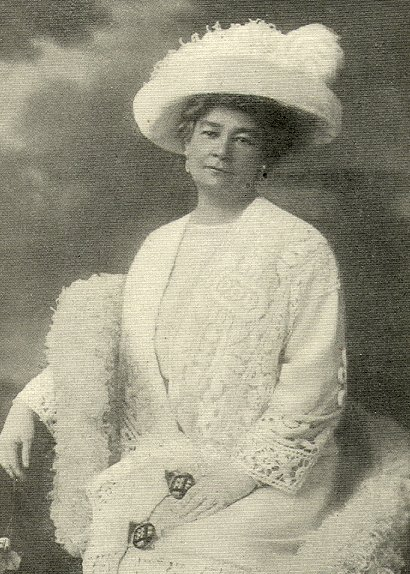
Ernestine Schumann-Heink

The Hoover Sentinels was a radio concert series which was broadcast on NBC from 1927 to 1935. Sponsored by Hoover Vacuums, it was sometimes heard as Madame Schumann-Heink, Hoover Sentinels Serenade, Sentinels Serenade or Hoover Sentinels .

The 30-minute program initially aired on Sunday evenings at 10pm and later on Sunday afternoons at 5pm. In 1934-35 it was in the top ten of the highest-rated radio programs.

The program's vocalist was contralto Ernestine Schumann-Heink, who also was heard on Enna Jettick Melodies. In 1934, she also did a 15-minute Sunday evening series for Gerber's baby food.

Guest stars on the program included pianist Rudolph Ganz, dancer Irene Castle McLaughlin, and violinist Albert Spalding.

When The Hoover Sentinels came to an end in 1935, the 5pm timeslot was taken over by The General Motors Hour.

== Sources ==
- Summers, Harrison B., A Thirty-Year History of Programs Carried on National Radio Networks in the U. S. 1926-1956, Arno Press and The New York Times, 1971.
