= House of Myths =

Carlton E. Morse

House of Myths was an early radio series which aired on NBC in 1926-29.

It was unique in that programs broadcast on the East Coast were soon followed by totally different programs in a West Coast series broadcast from San Francisco.

The West Coast version was scripted by Carlton E. Morse. In 1928, Morse was working at the San Francisco Bulletin, when it merged into the San Francisco Call, leaving Morse out of work. He then applied for a job with NBC, as he later explained:

They had a show coming in from New York -- it was called The House of Myths, dramatizations of Greek classics. They said, "We can't do these -- they're terrible. Can you take them and rewrite them, or dramatize some myths that we could produce?" So, they sent me home, and I conceived the idea of doing the myths in modern vernacular with a heavy tongue-in-cheek innuendo on the sex life of the Gods.

While working on the script, Morse got a job offer from The Seattle Times and had to make a decision. He decided radio had great possibilities, quickly completed the script, returned to NBC offices and was immediately hired. He never returned to newspaper work because radio offered him creative freedom, as he later recalled during a radio interview:

During those days, the thing that was so very pleasant was that there were no standards of writing. You were turned loose to think of something and do it. And out of this maelstrom of confusion came many of the shows that later developed into Coast and National shows. It was a wonderful time. It was a new era in a new medium and everybody has his opportunity.

He continued scripting House of Myths until the series came to an end.
