= Eddie Firestone =

American actor (1920–2007)

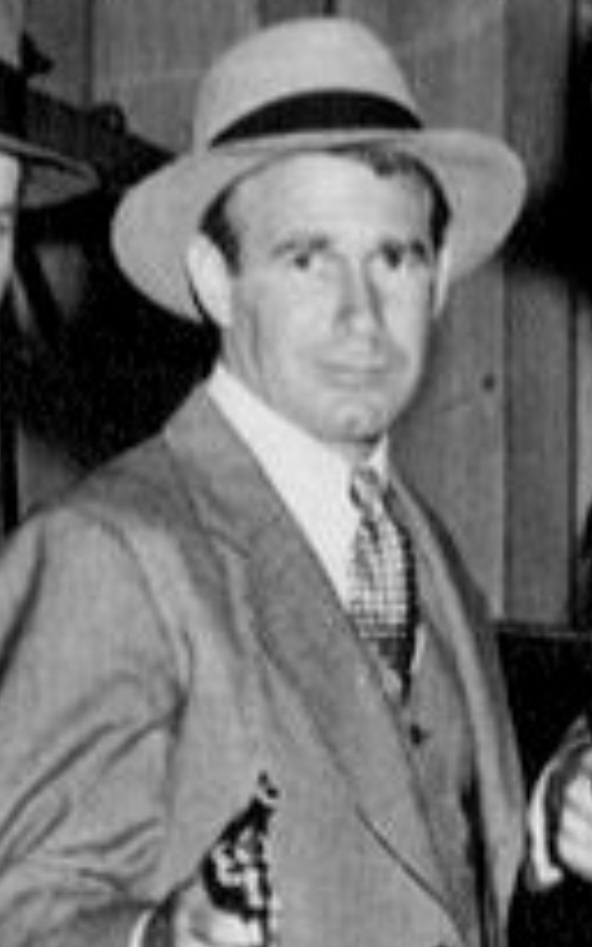
- Firestone in The Untouchables (1959)
- Born: December 11, 1920
- Died: March 1, 2007 (aged 86)
- Resting place: Valhalla Memorial Park Cemetery
- Other name: Eddie Firestone Jr.
- Occupation: Actor
- Years active: 1932–1990

Eddie Firestone (December 11, 1920 – March 1, 2007), sometimes known as Eddie Firestone Jr., was an American radio, television, and film actor who accumulated over 200 total credits during his performing career.

He played the wino who was kidnapped in Hawaii 5-0 Season 2, Episode 13 "The Joker's Wild, Man, Wild."

== Early life ==
When he was 12, Firestone, along with Harold Peary, was in the cast of Wheatenaville , a program broadcast on NBC's Pacific network beginning September 26, 1932.

== Career ==
An early success was in the title role of radio's That Brewster Boy. While doing that program, he also was an undergraduate student at Northwestern University. He left the program during World War II to join the United States Marine Corps in 1943, where he was commissioned, reaching the rank of captain, remaining in the Marine Corps Reserve until 1957.

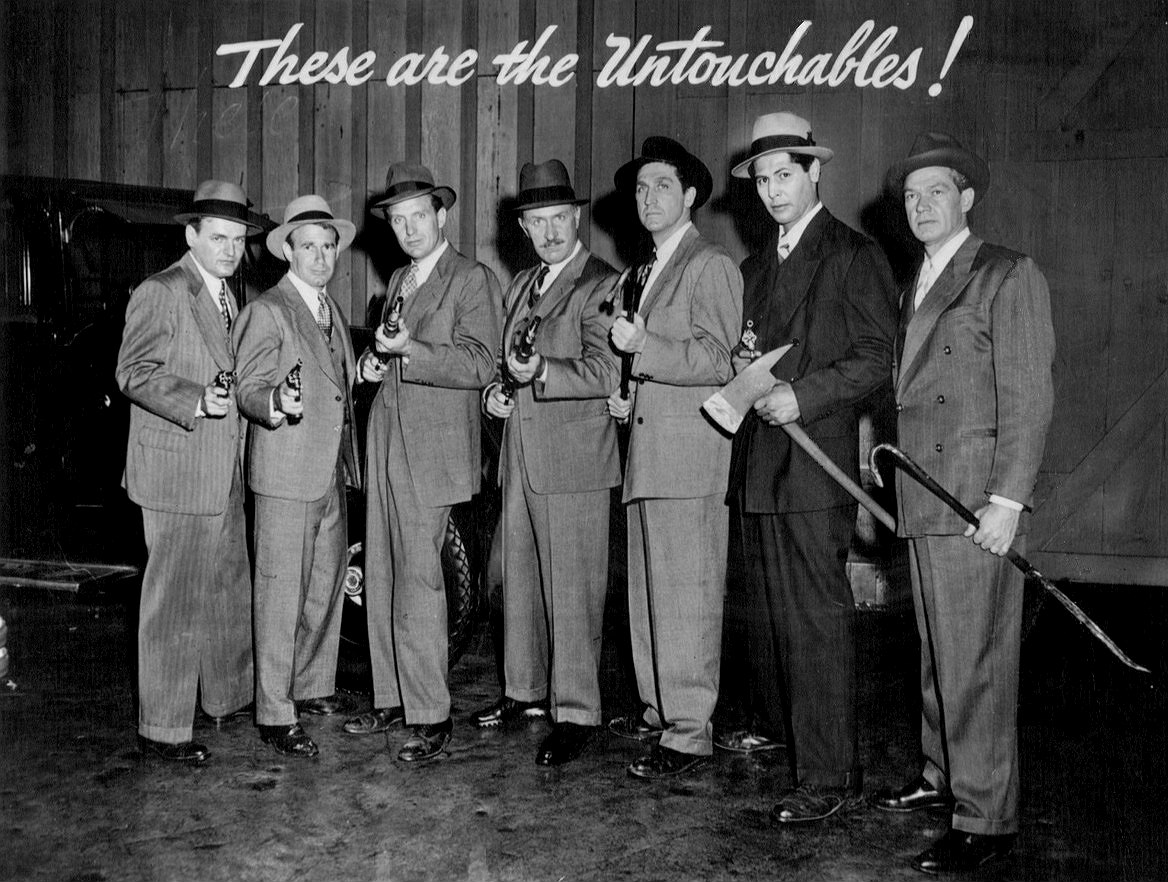
In the Desilu Playhouse version of The Untouchables, L-R: Bob Osterloh, Eddie Firestone, Robert Stack, Keenan Wynn, Peter Leeds, Abel Fernandez and Bill Williams (1959)

Some of the first television appearances with Firestone was in the first season of Jack Webb's Dragnet (1951–52). He guest-starred in "The Big Lamp" in Season 1, Episode 14 on Dragnet, in Season 1, Episode 3 of The Dick Van Dyke Show he played Tom Edson in "Sally and the lab technician". He wore a suit, bowtie, was clean shaven, had big round glasses and played a girl-shy, nerdy lab technician that works up his nerve to take Sally on a date. He was cast in a 1961 episode of "The Charity Drive" of Window on Main Street. Firestone appeared in several roles on the popular Western television series Bonanza, Hogan's Heroes, as well as in Walt Disney's feature film The Great Locomotive Chase. He also appeared on Perry Mason ("The Case of the "Dodging Domino", 1962; "The Case of the Decadent Dean", 1963; "The Case of a Place Called Midnight", 1964). Eddie Firestone appeared in the original Hawaii Five-O (1968-1980) series in guest roles, notably playing "Stumbles" the wino in season 2, episode 13, "The Joker's Wild, Man, Wild" (1969). He appeared in Barnaby Jones, in the 1975 episode "Trap Play". In 1967, he appeared in the only two part episode of Gunsmoke, entitled "Nitro". He returned to Gunsmoke in 1974 in the episode "The Tarnished Badge". He also guest-starred in "Prosecutor", the 1970 debut of The Silent Force. He guest starred in three episodes of The Rockford Files. He also appeared in the last episode of Logan's Run titled "Stargate" in 1978. He also appeared as Joe Donovan in the season 12 episode "Sign of the Ram" (1979). In 1968, Eddie played Sid on The Big Valley episode “The Jonah.”

== Death ==
Firestone is buried in Valhalla Memorial Park Cemetery in North Hollywood in Los Angeles, California.

== Filmography ==
- The Jackpot (1950) – Mr. McDougall (uncredited)
- With a Song in My Heart (1952) – USO Performer (uncredited)
- We're Not Married! (1952) – Man in Radio Station (uncredited)
- One Minute to Zero (1952) – Lt. Stevens (uncredited)
- Call Me Madam (1953) – Reporter (uncredited)
- Fighter Attack (1953) P47 Fighter Pilot (uncredited)
- Good Morning, Miss Dove (1955) – Fred Makepeace (uncredited)
- The Revolt of Mamie Stover (1956) – Tarzan
- The Great Locomotive Chase (1956) – Robert Buffum
- The Brass Legend (1956) – Shorty
- Bailout at 43,000 (1957) – Captain Mike Cavallero
- Joe Butterfly (1957) – Sgt. Oscar Hulick
- The Law and Jake Wade (1958) – Burke
- The Mountain Road (1960) – Major Lewis
- Angel Baby (1961) – Blind Man
- Two for the Seesaw (1962) – Oscar
- Bonanza (TV Series) (1965) season 06 episode 28 (A Good Night's Rest) - Josiah Potts
- Hogan's Heroes (TV Series) (1965) Season 01 Episode 09 (Go Light on the Heavy Water) - Scotty
- The Destructors (1968) – Dr. Barnes
- A Man Called Gannon (1968) – Maz
- Panic in the City (1968) – Owens
- Suppose They Gave a War and Nobody Came (1970) – Deputy Goulash
- Duel (1971) – Café owner
- The Todd Killings (1971) – Mr. Hassin
- The Virginian (1971) S9:E24 "Jump-Up" – Clark
- Pickup on 101 (1972) – Auto Mechanic
- Play It as It Lays (1972) – Benny Austin
- The Stone Killer (1973) – Armitage
- Invisible Strangler (1978) – Jacobs
- Galactica 1980 (1980) Galactica Discovers Earth: Part 1 – Derelict
