= Bill Idelson =

American actor (1919–2007)

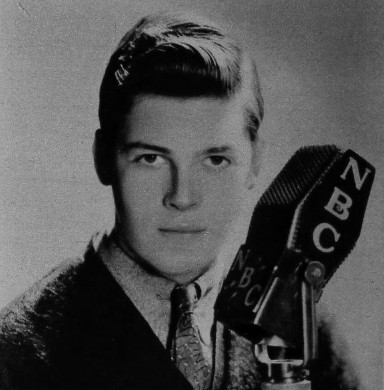
- Idelson in 1937
- Born: August 21, 1919; Forest Park, Illinois, U.S.
- Died: December 31, 2007 (aged 88); Los Angeles, California, U.S.
- Occupation(s): Television, voice actor, screenwriter, producer

Bill Idelson (August 21, 1919 – December 31, 2007) was an American actor, writer, director and producer widely known for his teenage role as Rush Gook on the radio comedy Vic and Sade and his recurring television role as Herman Glimscher on The Dick Van Dyke Show in the 1960s.

== Background ==
Idelson was born in Forest Park, Illinois, his parents were Russian immigrants. He joined the U.S. Navy in World War II and was awarded a Distinguished Flying Cross and four Air Medals as a night fighter pilot. He later married actress Seemah Wilder with whom he had three sons, Paul, Howie and Jonathan as well as a daughter, TV writer and actress Ellen Idelson, who died in 2003.

Idelson died in 2007 from complications due to a hip injury. On his death, writer-director Norman Corwin told the Los Angeles Times Idelson was "a luminary, he stood out among the radio comedians." Creator of The Dick Van Dyke Show, Carl Reiner, said Idelson was "a very subtle actor. He made no big movements, and every time you cut to him you could get a laugh."

== Career ==
=== Radio ===
Idelson's acting career began in 1931 on Chicago's WGN radio, when he played Skeezix on Uncle Walt and Skeezix, a radio drama based on the Gasoline Alley comic strip. One year later he landed the role of Rush on the long-running Vic and Sade, playing the role until he joined the U.S. Navy. He also had the title role on Cousin Willie and portrayed Bill Clark on Secret City, Hugo on The Trouble with the Truitts, and Chuck on That Brewster Boy.

After the war, his acting credits included radio and television versions of the daytime drama series One Man's Family.

=== Television ===
In The Dick Van Dyke Show Idelson played Herman Glimscher, the milquetoast boyfriend of Sally Rogers (Rose Marie). "Herman could never marry because his mother wouldn't sign off on it yet, and when he had a date with Sally Rogers he brought his mother a couple of times," show creator and co-star Carl Reiner told the Los Angeles Times. He re-created the role in the first decade of the 21st century for a reunion show of The Dick Van Dyke Show, with Herman finally married to Sally as she joins her former colleague Rob Petrie (Dick Van Dyke) to write a new special for their megalomaniacal former boss, Alan Brady (Reiner).

Idelson guest starred on episodes of Dragnet, The Twilight Zone, My Favorite Martian, The Odd Couple, Happy Days, Perry Mason and Will & Grace, in which he appeared along with his wife and daughter.

He wrote the Long Distance Call episode of The Twilight Zone (1960) for CBS then several episodes of The Dick Van Dyke Show, leading him to further writing work on Gomer Pyle, U.S.M.C., The Andy Griffith Show, Get Smart, The Odd Couple, M*A*S*H and Happy Days. He received two Writers Guild Awards for best episodic comedy, one for an episode of Get Smart and the other for an episode of The Andy Griffith Show.

His producing credits included The McLean Stevenson Show, The Bob Newhart Show, Anna and the King and Love, American Style.

=== Film ===
Idelson appeared as the head of a band organization in the film Pete Kelly's Blues.

=== Writing ===
He was the author of three books, The Story of Vic and Sade, Gibby (an autobiographical novel about a fighter pilot) and Bill Idelson's Writing Class.
