= Mystery House (radio drama) =

Mystery House was a radio drama series which began broadcasting on NBC in 1929. The program was an early effort at bringing thriller and suspense dramas to the airwaves.

The Oakland Tribune offered this description of the program on September 21, 1930:

Mystery House to Offer More Thrills
Thrills and spine-chilling happenings framed against a musical background are again promised NBC listeners when another episode of Mystery House is released this evening between 5:45 and 6:15 o'clock, P.S.T. The melodrama serial is to be heard on KGO.

== Cast ==
Chester Stratton played Lynn Edwards, and Teresa Dale played Mrs. Pendergast.

== Formats of fear ==
A later series with the same title prompted speculation at Radio Archives:

Mystery House staffers would perform in each half-hour drama, while others would provide sound effects, rewrite scripts and so on. But could this really succeed as a business model? Would people buy a mystery book if they already knew the ending? An interesting question, considering how little information there is available about the firm -- or if, in fact, it even existed. Research into this query turned up an address for "Mystery House" at 70 Park Avenue in New York City, where a hotel now stands, and that the publishing firm ceased operation sometime after 1964. As for the broadcast history behind the series, the "shroud of mystery" remains intact. Newspaper archives report a series with that name as having been broadcast in 1929 over WGN in Chicago and apparently still on the air as late as 1951. The show was broadcast in a variety of formats; sometimes as a weekly half-hour, sometimes as a five-day-a-week quarter-hour show. Mystery House has also been associated with appearances on WOR in New York; both WOR and WGN were flagship stations of the Mutual network at that time.
