= The General Electric Concert =

US radio program

The General Electric Concert was a music series sponsored by General Electric and broadcast on the NBC Red Network beginning in 1931.

Featuring orchestral selections along with tenor Richard Crooks, the 30-minute program aired Sunday afternoon at 5:30 pm in 1931–32. It moved to Sunday evenings at 9 pm for the 1932–33 season.

As early as 1923, General Electric sponsored radio programs on WGY in Schenectady, New York. Walter Damrosch, a pioneer in the presentation of music on radio, conducted the orchestra for General Electric in the late 1920s and early 1930s on a program that was listed in newspapers as Damrosch's General Electric Concert.

== See also ==
- Music Appreciation Hour
