= One Man's Family =

American radio and television soap opera

- Cast of radio's One Man's Family, clockwise from lower left: Jack (Billy Page), Clifford (Barton Yarborough), Mrs. Barbour (Minetta Ellen), Claudia (Kathleen Wilson), Paul (Michael Raffetto), Hazel (Bernice Berwin), Mr. Barbour (J. Anthony Smythe).
- Genre: soap opera
- Country of origin: United States
- Language: English
- Written by: Carlton E. Morse
- Original release: April 29, 1932 – April 24, 1959
- No. of episodes: 3,256

One Man's Family is an American radio soap opera, heard for almost three decades, from 1932 to 1959. Created by Carlton E. Morse, it was the longest-running uninterrupted dramatic serial in the history of American radio. Television versions of the series aired in prime time from 1949 to 1952 and in daytime from 1954 to 1955.

== Radio ==
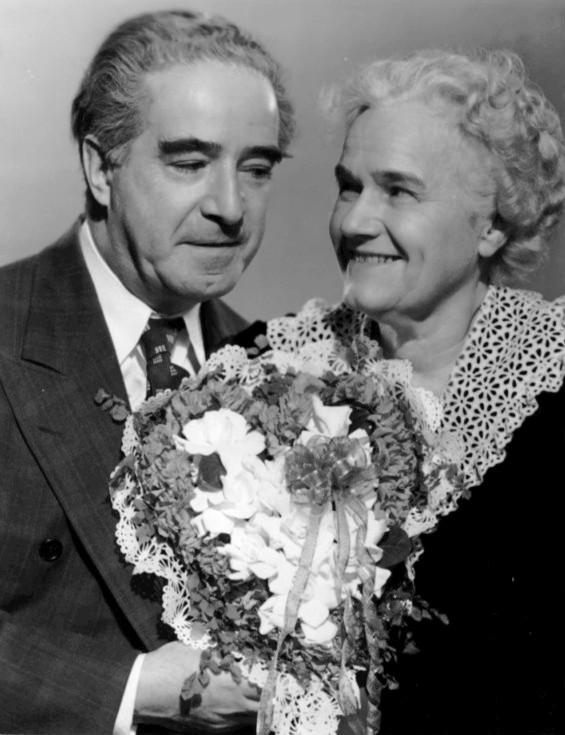
Henry and Fanny Barbour (Smythe and Minetta Ellen), 1950.

One Man's Family debuted as a radio series on April 29, 1932, in Los Angeles, Seattle and San Francisco, moving to the full West Coast NBC network the following month, sponsored by Snowdrift and Wesson Oil. On May 17, 1933, it expanded to the full coast-to-coast NBC network as the first West Coast show heard regularly on the East Coast. The show was broadcast as a weekly half-hour series (1933-1950) [sustained by Standard Brands from 1935 through 1949], then shifted to daily 15-minute installments, initially originating in the studios of San Francisco radio station KPO, NBC's flagship station for the West Coast, eventually moving to Los Angeles.

The program's nationwide expansion came after NBC executives began receiving letters from people in the eastern part of the United States saying that they were staying up until 1 a.m. to hear the broadcasts from the West Coast. The network conducted a trial series of broadcasts from Schenectady, and when an episode was omitted one night, "a flood of telephone calls swamped the switchboard". Going nationawide meant adding a broadcast at 5:30 p.m. Pacific Time each Wednesday while the West Coast broadcasts continued as usual.

== Characters and story ==
The series employed a literary device with episodes divided into books and chapters. Spanning 27 years, the program presented 136 books with 3,256 chapters. Storylines were set in the Sea Cliff area of San Francisco, California, an area familiar to San Franciscan Carlton E. Morse. The radio plotline centered on stockbroker Henry Barbour, his wife Fanny and their five children (chronologically: Paul, Hazel, the twins Clifford and Claudia, and Jack). The dialogue included many specific references to San Francisco, including the Golden Gate Bridge, which the Barbours could see from their rear living room window or their garden wall.

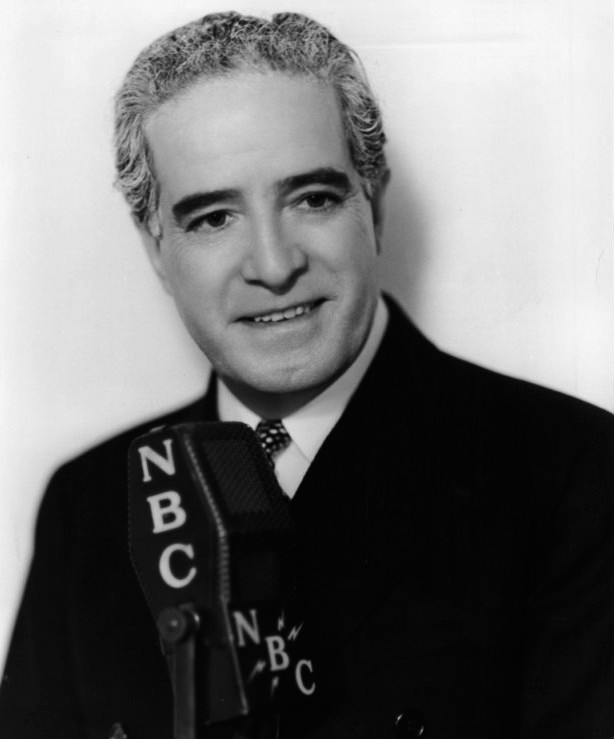
Smythe circa 1930s.

After 3,256 episodes, the radio series ceased production on April 24, 1959 (several sources give the date of May 8, 1959). One Man's Family was the longest-running serial drama in American radio broadcasting, edging out Ma Perkins (although Ma Perkins produced over twice as many episodes). Organist Paul Carson, who played the background music and the opening theme, "Destiny Waltz" (1932–41), composed the show's later theme, "Waltz Patrice" (aka "Patricia"). Among its other trademarks, episodes were introduced as if they were chapters from books.

== Overseas ==
Two Australian versions of One Man's Family were broadcast in Australia in the late 1930s/early 1940s; in Sydney on 2CH and in Melbourne on 3XY. 3XY opened in 1935 and was originally a very low rating station, until the great popularity of One Man's Family changed its fortunes. The Melbourne version featured 3XY announcer Carl Bleazby (who later featured in the Australian Broadcasting Commission's popular TV series, Bellbird). By 1939, Doreen McKay was portraying Claudia in an Australian version.

== Television ==
One Man's Family had the rare distinction of airing both in prime time and daytime television. The first TV version (November 4, 1949–June 21, 1952) ran in prime time once a week for a half-hour and reverted the stories back to the 1932 storylines. Hazel was a 28-year-old who yearned for marriage, Cliff and Claudia were students at Stanford University, and Jack was ten years old. The prime time version focused on Fanny's attempts to mediate between her old-world husband and her independent-minded children.

The show was revived as a daily 15-minute daytime TV show on NBC from March 1954 to April 1955.

In 1965, General Foods offered to sponsor another version of One Man's Family on NBC, but NBC passed and picked up Days of Our Lives instead.

== See also ==
- List of radio soaps
- List of longest-serving soap opera actors
- Michael Raffetto

== Sources ==
Scripts for One Man's Family were rewritten as prose fiction and serialized in Movie-Radio Guide beginning in April 1942.

- Walter P. Sheppard, One Man's Family: A History 1932 to 1959 and a Script Analysis 1932 to 1944, University of Wisconsin, 1964 (doctoral dissertation; available through University Microfilms). "Some Notes on 'One Man's Family,'" article drawn from the dissertation, Journal of Broadcasting, Vol. XIV, No. 2 (Spring 1970).

== Listen to ==
- RadioLovers: One Man's Family (two episodes)
