= List of old-time radio programs =

Listed below are notable vintage radio programs associated with old-time radio, also called Radio's Golden Age.

== United States Golden Age programs ==
=== # ===
- 10-2-4 Ranch
- 15 Minutes with Bing Crosby
- 19 Nocturne Boulevard
- 20 Questions
- 2000 Plus
- 21st Precinct
- 33 Half Moon Street
- 5 Minute Mysteries

=== A ===
- A Case for Dr. Morelle
- The A&P Gypsies
- The Abbott and Costello Show
- Abbott Mysteries
- ABC Mystery Theater
- Abie's Irish Rose
- Academy Award Theater
- Accordiana
- Acousticon Hour
- Add a Line
- Address Unknown
- Adopted Daughter
- Adult Education Series
- Adventures Ahead
- Adventures by Morse
- Adventure Parade
- The Adventures of the Abbotts
- The Adventures of Babe Ruth
- The Adventures of Bill Lance
- The Adventures of Champion
- The Adventures of Charlie Chan
- Adventures of Danny Marsdon
- The Adventures of Dick Cole
- The Adventures of Ellery Queen
- The Adventures of Father Brown
- The Adventures of Frank Merriwell
- The Adventures of Frank Race
- The Adventures of Harry Lime
- The Adventures of Jack Lime
- The Adventures of Maisie
- The Adventures of Nero Wolfe
- The Adventures of Ozzie and Harriet
- The Adventures of Philip Marlowe
- The Adventures of Rocky Jordan
- The Adventures of Sam Spade
- The Adventures of Superman
- The Adventures of the Thin Man
- The Adventures of Topper
- The Affairs of Ann Scotland
- Against the Storm
- The Air Adventures of Jimmie Allen
- Air Mail Mystery
- A.L. Alexander's Mediation Board
- The Al Jolson Show
- The Alan Young Show
- The Aldrich Family
- Alec Templeton Time
- Alias Jimmy Valentine
- Alka-Seltzer Time
- Al Pearce
- Amanda of Honeymoon Hill
- The Amazing Mr. Malone
- The Amazing Mr. Tutt
- The Amazing Nero Wolfe
- The American Album of Familiar Music
- The American Forum of the Air
- American History Through Radio
- American Portraits
- The American School of the Air
- Americas Answer
- Amos 'n' Andy
- An Evening with Romberg
- The Anderson Family
- The Andrews Sisters
- Andy and Virginia
- The Andy Russell Show
- Ann of the Airlanes
- Appointment with Music
- Arch Oboler's Plays
- Archie Andrews
- Arco Birthday Party
- Are These Our Children
- Ask Eddie Cantor
- At Ease
- The Arkansas Traveler
- The Armour Jester
- Armstrong's Theatre of Today
- The Army Hour
- Arnold Grimm's Daughter
- Art Baker's Notebook
- Arthur Godfrey's Talent Scouts
- Attorney For The Defense
- The Atwater Kent Hour
- The Aunt Jemima Radio Show
- Aunt Jenny's Real Life Stories
- Aunt Mary
- Author's Playhouse
- Avalon Time
- The Avenger
- Avengers

=== B ===
- The Baby Snooks Show
- Bachelor's Children
- Backstage Wife
- The Baker's Broadcast
- Baltimore Achievement Hour
- Barrie Craig, Confidential Investigator
- Beale Street Nightlife
- Beat the Band
- Beulah
- The Beatrice Kay Show
- Behind the Mike
- The Bell Telephone Hour
- Best Plays
- Betty and Bob
- Beulah
- Beyond Midnight
- The Bickersons
- Big Guy
- The Big Show
- Big Sister
- The Big Story
- Big Town
- The Bill Goodwin Show
- The Billie Burke Show
- The Bing Crosby and Rosemary Clooney Show
- Bing Crosby Entertains
- The Bird's Eye Open House
- The Bishop and the Gargoyle
- Black Cameos
- The Black Castle
- Blackhawk
- Black Hood
- The Black Mass
- The Black Museum
- Blackstone, the Magic Detective
- Blackstone Plantation
- Blair of the Mounties
- Blind Date
- Blondie
- Blue Beetle
- Blue Monday Jamboree
- Blue Ribbon Town
- Bob and Ray
- Bob Barclay
- The Bob Crosby Show
- The Bob Hope Show
- Bobby Benson and the B-Bar-B Riders
- Bold Venture
- Border Patrol
- Boston Blackie
- Box 13
- Brave New World
- Brave Tomorrow
- Break the Bank
- Breakfast Club
- Breakfast at Sardi's
- Breakfast in Hollywood
- Brenda Curtis
- Brenthouse
- Bright Star (a.k.a. Irene Dunne and Fred MacMurray Show)
- The Brighter Day
- Bring 'Em Back Alive
- Bringing Up Father
- Broadway Bandbox
- Broadway Is My Beat
- Broadway Talks Back (1946-1947)
- Brown Women in White
- Brownstone Theater
- Buck Rogers in the 25th Century
- Bulldog Drummond
- The Burkiss Way
- Burns and Allen

=== C ===
- Cab Calloway's Quizzical
- Cabin B-13
- The Cabin Door
- Cabin Nights
- Cafe Istanbul
- Call for Music
- Call the Police
- Calling All Cars
- Calling All Detectives
- Camel Caravan
- Campana Serenade
- The Campbell Playhouse
- The Candid Microphone
- Candy Matson
- Can You Top This?
- Captain Flagg and Sergeant Quirt
- Captain Midnight
- Careless Love
- The Carnation Contented Hour
- The Carters of Elm Street
- The Casebook of Gregory Hood
- Case Dismissed
- Cases of Mr. Ace
- Casey, Crime Photographer
- Cavalcade of America
- CBS Radio Workshop
- CBS Radio Mystery Theater
- Ceiling Unlimited
- Cellar Knights
- Challenge of the Yukon
- The Chamber Music Society of Lower Basin Street
- Chandu the Magician
- Chaplain Jim
- Charlie Chan
- Charlie McCarthy
- Charlie Wild, Private Detective
- The Charlotte Greenwood Show
- The Chase
- The Chase and Sanborn Hour
- Chase and Sanborn Program
- Chesterfield Supper Club
- Chick Carter, Boy Detective
- Chickenman
- Child's World
- Chips Davis, Commando
- Chuckwagon Jamboree
- Cimarron Tavern
- The Cinnamon Bear
- The Cisco Kid
- City Desk
- Clara, Lu, and Em
- Claudia and David
- Claybourne
- The Clicquot Club Eskimos
- The Clitheroe Kid
- Cloak and Dagger
- The Clock
- Club Fifteen
- Clutching Hand Confession
- Coca-Cola Topnotchers
- The Colgate Sports Newsreel
- The Collier Hour
- Colored Kiddies' Radio Hour and Coloured Kiddies of the Air
- Coronet Story Teller
- Columbia Presents Corwin
- Columbia Workshop
- Command Performance
- Congo Curt
- The Count of Monte Cristo
- Counterspy
- The Couple Next Door
- The Court of Human Relations.
- The Court of Missing Heirs
- The Creaking Door
- Cresta Blanca Carnival
- The Cresta Blanca Hollywood Players
- Crime and Peter Chambers
- Crime Classics
- The Crime Club
- Crime Correspondent
- Crime Doctor
- Crime Does Not Pay
- The Crime Files of Flamond
- Cruise of the Poll Parrot
- The Cuckoo Hour
- Curtain Time

=== D ===
- Damon Runyon Theatre
- Dan Dunn, Secret Operative#48
- Dan Harding's Wife
- Danger, Dr. Danfield
- Danger With Granger
- Dangerous Assignment
- Danny Kaye Show
- Dark Fantasy
- A Date With Judy
- The Dave Garroway Show
- David Harding: Counterspy
- A Day in the Life of Dennis Day
- Day of the Triffids
- Deadline Dramas
- Dear John
- Death Valley Days
- December Bride
- Defense Attorney
- Democracy – USA
- Dennis Day Show
- Destination Freedom'
- Detectives Black and Blue
- Diamond Dramas
- The Dick Haymes Show
- Dick Tracy
- Dimension X
- The Dinah Shore Show
- Doc Barclay's Daughters
- Doc Savage
- Doctor Christian
- Doctor I.Q.
- Doctor Kildare
- Doctor Paul
- Doctor Sixgun
- The Doctor's Wife
- Dodge Victory Hour
- Don McNeil's Breakfast Club
- Don Winslow Of The Navy
- Douglas of the World
- Dr. Standish, Medical Examiner
- Dragnet
- The Dreft Star Playhouse
- Drene Time
- Duffy's Tavern
- Dunninger

=== E ===
- Easy Aces
- The Edgar Bergen/Charlie McCarthy Show
- Ed Sullivan Entertains
- Ed Sullivan's Pipelines
- The Ed Sullivan Show
- Ed Sullivan Variety
- The Eddie Bracken Show
- Eddie Condon's Jazz Concerts
- Eileen Barton Show
- The Electric Hour
- Ellery Queen
- Empire Builders
- Enna Jettick Melodies
- The Eno Crime Club
- Escape
- Ethel and Albert
- Europe Confidential
- The Evelyn Preer Memorial Program
- Ever Since Eve
- The Eveready Hour
- Everyman's Theater
- Everything for the Boys
- Exploring Tomorrow

=== F ===
- The Fabulous Dr. Tweedy
- The Fair's Syncopaters
- The Falcon
- Family Hour of Stars
- Family Skeleton
- Family Theater
- Famous Jury Trials
- The Fat Man
- Father Knows Best
- Favorite Story
- The FBI in Peace and War
- Federal Agent
- Fibber McGee and Molly
- The Fifth Horseman
- Finders Keepers
- The Fire Chief
- Firefighters
- The First Nighter Program
- The Fitch Bandwagon
- The Five Mysteries Program
- Five Star Theater
- Flash Gordon
- The Fleischmann Yeast Hour (a.k.a. Harlem)
- Floyd Calvin Hour (originally The Pittsburgh Courier Hour)
- Flywheel, Shyster, and Flywheel
- Folks from Dixie
- The Ford Sunday Evening Hour
- Ford Theater
- Forecast
- Foreign Assignment
- Forever Ernest
- Fort Laramie
- Four Star Playhouse
- Frank Race
- Frank Sinatra In Person
- The Frank Sinatra Show
- Frank Sinatra Sings
- The Fred Allen Show
- The Fred Waring Show
- Freedom's People
- Frontier Fighters
- Frontier Gentleman
- Further Adventures of Sherlock Holmes

=== G ===
- Gang Busters
- Gaslight Gayeties
- Gasoline Alley
- Gateway to Hollywood
- The Gay Nineties Revue
- Gene and Glenn
- Gene Autry's Melody Ranch
- The General Mills Radio Adventure Theater
- The Ghost Corps
- GI Jive
- G.I. Journal
- The Gibson Family
- The Ginny Simms Show
- Glamour Manor
- The Goldbergs
- Good News of 1938
- The Good Time Society
- Good Will Hour
- Goodwill Court
- Granby's Green Acres
- Grand Central Station
- The Grand Marquee
- Grand Ole Opry
- The Greatest Story Ever Told
- The Great Gildersleeve
- The Green Hornet
- Great Moments in History
- The Green Valley Line
- Guest Star
- The Guiding Light
- The Gulf Headliners
- The Gulf Screen Guild Theater
- The Gumps
- Gunsmoke
- Guy Lombardo

=== H ===
- Hal Perry
- The Hall of Fantasy
- Hallmark Hall of Fame
- Hallmark Playhouse
- The Halls of Ivy
- Hannibal Cobb
- Hap Hazard
- The Happiness Boys
- Happy Island
- Harlem, USA
- A Harlem Family (originally Muddy Waters)
- Harlem Fantasies
- Harlem Headlines
- Harlem on Parade
- Harlem Varieties
- The Harold Peary Show
- Harold Teen
- Harvest of Stars
- Hashknife Hartley
- Have Gun, Will Travel
- Hawaii Calls
- Hawk Durango
- Hawk Larabee
- The H-Bar-O Rangers
- Hear It Now
- Hearts in Harmony
- Heathstone
- Hello Americans
- Helpmate
- Henry Allen, American
- The Henry Morgan Show
- Her Honor, Nancy James
- Hercule Poirot
- Here Comes Tomorrow
- Here's Frank Sinatra
- Heritage over the Land
- The Hermit's Cave
- The High-Jinkers
- Hilltop House
- Hit the Jackpot
- Hogan's Daughter
- Holiday and Company
- Honest Harold
- Hollywood Hotel
- Hollywood on the Air
- Hollywood Showcase
- Hollywood Star Preview
- Hollywood Star Playhouse
- Hollywood Star Time (dramatic anthology)
- Hollywood Star Time (interview program)
- Home of the Brave
- Honolulu Bound
- Hoofbeats
- Hop Harrigan
- Hopalong Cassidy
- Horatio Hornblower
- Hot Copy
- The Hour of Charm
- The Hour of Saint Francis
- House of Glass
- The House of Mystery
- House of Myths
- House Party
- The Housewives' Protective League
- Howie Wing
- Metal Hall
- Hymns of All Churches

=== I ===
- I Deal in Crime
- I Fly Anything
- I Love a Mystery
- I Was a Communist for the FBI
- In the Name of the Law
- In Person, Dinah Shore
- Incredible, but True
- Indictment
- Information Please
- Inheritance
- Inner Sanctum Mystery
- Interracial Husical Hour
- The Intimate Revue
- The Ipana Troubadors
- Irene Dunne and Fred MacMurray Show (a.k.a. Bright Star)
- The Irene Rich Show
- Island Venture
- It Pays to Be Ignorant
- It's a Crime, Mr. Collins
- It's a Great Life
- It's Higgins, Sir

=== J ===
- Jack Armstrong, the All-American Boy
- The Jack Benny Program
- The Jack Berch Show
- The Jack Smith Show
- The Jack Carson Show
- The Jane Pickens Show
- Jean Shepherd
- Jeff Regan, Investigator
- Jill's Juke Box
- The Jimmy Durante Show
- The Jimmy Durante and Garry Moore Show
- Joan Davis Time
- Joanie's Tea Room
- Joe and Mabel
- The Joe E. Brown Show
- The Joe Penner Show
- John Henry, Black River Giant
- John J. Anthony
- John Steele, Adventurer
- Yours Truly, Johnny Dollar
- Johnny Fletcher
- Johnny Mercer's Music Shop
- Johnny Midnight
- Johnny Modero, Pier 23
- The Johnson Family
- John's Other Wife
- Jonathan Thomas and his Christmas on the Moon
- Jonathan Trimble, Esquire
- Joseph Marais and Miranda
- Journey into Space
- Joyce Jordan, M.D.
- Jubilee
- The Judy Canova Show
- Jungle Jim
- Junior G-Men
- Junior Miss
- Just Plain Bill
- The Jack Kirkwood Show

=== K ===
- Kate Hopkins, Angel of Mercy
- The Kate Smith Hour
- Kay Kyser's Kollege of Musical Knowledge
- Keeping Up With Daughter
- The Ken Murray Program
- The Key
- King Biscuit Time
- Kitchen-Klatter
- Knickerbocker Playhouse
- Komedic Kapers
- Korn's-A-Krackin'
- Kraft Music Hall

=== L ===
- Ladies Be Seated
- Land of the Lost
- Laundryland Lyrics
- Leave It to Joan
- Lear Radio Show
- Leo is on the Air
- The Les Paul Show
- Lest We Forget
- Let George Do It
- Let's Go to Town
- Let's Pretend
- Let's Pretend with Uncle Russ
- Life Can Be Beautiful
- The Life of Riley
- Life with Luigi
- Life with the Lyons
- Light of the World
- Light Up Time
- Lightning Jim
- Lights Out
- The Lineup
- Little Orphan Annie
- The Lives of Harry Lime
- Living Dramas of the Bible
- The Lone Ranger
- Lonely Women
- The Longines Symphonette
- Long John Nebel
- Lorenzo Jones
- Louella Parsons
- Luke Slaughter of Tombstone
- Lum and Abner
- Luncheon at Sardi's
- Lux Radio Theatre
- Lux Summer Theatre

=== M ===
- Ma and Pa
- Ma Johnson's Harlem Rooming House (a.k.a. Ma Johnson's Harlem Boarding House)
- Ma Perkins
- Magic Island
- The Magic Key of RCA
- Mail Call
- Major Bowes Amateur Hour
- Major Hoople
- Make Believe Town
- Mama Bloom's Brood
- Man About Harlem
- The Man Behind the Gun
- A Man Called Jordan
- The Man Called X
- Man of Color
- Mandrake the Magician
- Manhattan Merry-Go-Round
- Marie the Little French Princess
- Mark Trail
- The Marriage
- The Martin and Lewis Show
- Martin Kane, Private Eye
- Mary Foster, Editor's Daughter
- Matinee Theater
- Maxwell House Show Boat
- Mayor of the Town
- Meet Mr. McNulty
- Metal Hall
- Meet Corliss Archer
- Meet Frank Sinatra
- Meet Me at Parky's
- Meet Millie
- Meet the Meeks
- Meetin' House
- Men o' War
- The Mel Blanc's Fix-It Shop
- The Mercury Summer Theatre of the Air
- The Mercury Theatre on the Air
- MGM Musical Comedy Theater of the Air
- The MGM Theater of the Air
- Michael Shayne
- The Mickey Mouse Theater of the Air
- The Mildred Bailey Revue
- Millions for Defense
- The Milton Berle Show
- The Minute Men
- The Mirth Parade
- The Misadventures of Si and Elmer
- Les Misérables
- Moe Levy and Son's Colored Review
- Mollé Mystery Theatre
- Mommie and the Men
- Monitor
- Monticello Party Line
- Moon Over Africa
- The Morey Amsterdam Show
- Mr. and Mrs. Blandings
- Mr. and Mrs. North
- Mr. District Attorney
- Mr. Keen, Tracer of Lost Persons
- Mr. Moto
- Mrs. Wiggs of the Cabbage Patch
- Murder and Mr. Malone
- Murder at Midnight
- Murder by Experts
- Murder Is My Hobby
- Music Appreciation Hour
- My Favorite Husband
- My Friend Irma
- My Name is Adam Kane
- Myrt & Marge
- The Mysterious Traveler
- Mystery is my Hobby
- Mystery House
- Mystery in the Air
- My True Story
- Mystery Is My Hobby

=== N ===
- National Barn Dance
- NBC Bandstand
- NBC Presents: Short Story
- NBC Symphony Orchestra
- NBC University Theater
- The National Farm and Home Hour
- National Negro Forum
- National Negro Hour
- Native Sons
- Ned Jordan:Secret Agent
- Negro Achievement Hour (Harrisburg, PA & New York)
- Negro Art Group Hour
- Negro Business Hour (Baltimore & Cleveland)
- Negro Forum Hour
- Negro Musical Hour
- Negro Newsfront
- The Negro Progress Hour
- The Nelson Eddy Show
- Nestle Chocolateers
- The New Adventures of Nero Wolfe
- The New Adventures of Sherlock Holmes
- New World A'Coming
- Nick Carter, Master Detective
- Night Beat
- Night Editor
- Nightfall
- Now and Forever
- Now Hear This
- Now Nordine

=== O ===
- The Ol' Dirt Dauber
- Oldsmobile Program
- On The 8:15
- On Broadway
- One Man's Family
- The Original Amateur Hour
- The Orson Welles Almanac
- The Orson Welles Show
- Our Gal Sunday
- Our Miss Brooks
- Ozark Jubilee
- Ozzie and Harriet

=== P ===
- Pabst Blue Ribbon Town
- Painted Dreams
- Palmolive Beauty Box Theater
- Parties at Pickfair
- The Passing Parade
- Passport to Romance
- Pat Novak, for Hire
- The Penny Singleton Show
- People Are Funny
- Pepsodent Show Starring Bob Hope
- Pepper Young's Family
- Perry Mason
- Pete Kelly's Blues
- The Peter Lind Hayes Show
- Philco Radio Time
- The Phil Harris-Alice Faye Show
- Philip Morris Playhouse
- Phillip Marlowe: Private Detective
- Philo Vance
- Phyl Coe Mysteries
- Pick and Pat
- The Planet Man
- Point Sublime
- Police Headquarters
- Police Reporter
- Portia Faces Life
- Ports of Call
- Pot o' Gold
- Professor Quiz
- Proudly We Hail
- Pullman Porter's Hour
- Pursuit

=== Q ===
- Queen for a Day
- Quick As a Flash
- Quiet, Please
- Quiz Kids

=== R ===
- Radio Espionage
- Radio Reader's Digest
- The Railroad Hour
- Ranger Bill
- Ray Bolger Show
- Red Foley Show
- Red Ryder
- The Red Skelton Show
- Reflections
- Reg'lar Fellers
- Richard Diamond, Private Detective
- The Right to Happiness
- Road of Life
- Rocky Fortune
- Rocky Jordan
- Rogue's Gallery
- The Romance of Helen Trent
- Romance of the Ranchos
- Rosa Rio Rhythms
- Roxy and His Gang
- The Roy Rogers Show
- The Rudy Vallée Show

=== S ===
- The Sad Sack
- The Saint
- Sam 'n' Henry
- Sam Spade
- Saturday Night Serenade
- Scattergood Baines
- Screen Director's Playhouse
- The Screen Guild Theater
- Secret Agent K7 Returns
- Secret Missions
- Secrets of Scotland Yard
- Sergeant Preston of the Yukon
- The Sealtest Village Store
- The Second Mrs. Burton
- The Shadow
- The Shadow of Fu Manchu
- Shell Chateau
- Sherlock Holmes
- Shuffle Along
- The Silver Eagle
- Silver Theater
- Sinclair Weiner Minstrels
- Sing Along With the Landt Trio
- Sing It Again
- Singin' Sam
- The Singing Lady
- The Six Shooter
- Skippy Hollywood Theatre
- Sky King
- Sleep No More
- Slow River
- Smiley Burnette
- Smilin' Jack
- The Smiths of Hollywood
- Soconyland Sketches
- The Somerset Maugham Theater
- Songs by Dinah Shore
- So Proudly We Hail
- Songs by Sinatra
- Sophie Tucker and Her Show
- Space Patrol
- Sparkle Time
- Speed Gibson of the International Secret Police
- The Spike Jones Show
- Spotlight Revue
- Squad Cars
- The Stan Freberg Show
- Stand By for Crime
- The Standard Hour
- The Standard School Broadcast
- Star Quest
- Stars over Hollywood
- Stella Dallas
- Stop Me If You've Heard This One
- Stop the Music
- Stories of the Black Chamber
- The Story of Bess Johnson
- The Story of Mary Marlin
- The Story of Ruby Valentine
- The Strange Dr. Weird
- Studio One
- Suspense

=== T ===
- Take It or Leave It
- Tales from the Diamond K
- Tales of Fatima
- Tales of Harlem
- Tales of the Texas Rangers
- Tarzan
- Taystee Bread Winners
- Teen Timers
- Tennessee Ernie Ford Show
- Tennessee Jed
- The Tenth Man
- Terry and the Pirates
- Texas Rangers
- Texaco Star Theater
- Thanks to the Yanks
- That Brewster Boy
- That's Rich
- Theater Five
- Theater of Romance
- Theatre Guild on the Air
- The Couple Next Door
- The Third man
- This Amazing America
- This Changing World
- This Is My Best
- This Is My Story
- This Is Nora Drake
- This Is Your FBI
- This Is Your Life
- Those Websters
- Those Who Made Good (a.k.a. Negroes Who Made Good and Men Who Made Good)
- Time for Love
- Today's Children
- Tom Corbett, Space Cadet
- Tom Mix
- The Twelve Players
- To Be Perfectly Frank
- Tommy Riggs and Betty Lou
- Top Secret
- Topper
- Town Hall
- Town Hall Tonight
- The Townsend Murder Mystery
- Treasury Star Parade
- True Adventures of Junior G-Men
- The True Story Court of Human Relations
- True Detective
- Truth or Consequences
- Truths About Harlem
- Twenty Questions
- The Twenty-Second Letter

=== U ===
- Uncle Charlie's Tent Show
- Uncle Don
- Uncle Jim's Question Bee
- Uncle Whoa Bill
- The Unexpected
- Unit 99
- Unshackled
- Up For Parole

=== V ===
- Valiant Lady
- Vic and Sade
- Victory Parade
- Victory Theater
- The Vikings
- Viva America
- The Voice of Firestone
- Vox Pop
- Voyage of the Scarlet Queen

=== W ===
- Waltz Time
- War Telescope
- We the People
- Weird Circle
- Whatever Became Of
- When a Girl Marries
- The Whisperer
- Whispering Streets
- The Whistler
- Whitehall 1212
- Who Said That?
- The Adventures of Wild Bill Hickok
- Willy Piper Show
- Wings Over Jordan
- The Witch's Tale
- WoodSongs Old-Time Radio Hour
- The Woolworth Hour
- Woman in White
- Wonder Show
- Worlds at War
- World Adventurer's Club
- World We're Fighting For

=== X ===
- The Xavier Cugat Show
- X Minus One

=== Y ===
- You Are There
- You Bet Your Life
- You Can't Do Business with Hitler
- Young Doctor Malone
- Young Love
- Young Widder Brown
- Your Hit Parade
- Your Story Hour
- Yours Truly, Johnny Dollar

=== Z ===
- The Zane Grey Show
- The Ziegfeld Follies of the Air

== Post-OTR U.S. radio programs ==
- 2000X
- Adventures of Harry Nile
- Alien Worlds
- The Cabinet of Dr. Fritz
- CBS Radio Mystery Theater
- Earplay
- The Firesign Theatre
- The Fourth Tower of Inverness
- Further Adventures of Sherlock Holmes
- The General Mills Radio Adventure Theater
- Hollywood Theater of the Ear
- Imagination Theater
- NPR Playhouse
- NPR's serialized adaptations of Star Wars, The Empire Strikes Back, and Return of the Jedi
- A Prairie Home Companion
- Radio Spirits
- Sears Radio Theater
- Seeing Ear Theater
- When Radio Was
- The Zero Hour

== Canadian Golden Age programs ==
- After Breakfast Breakdown
- Assignment
- Aunt Lucy
- Blended Rhythm
- Borden's Canadian Cavalcade
- Brave Voyage
- British Ballad Operas
- Canadian Theatre of the Air
- CBC Wednesday Night
- Citizen's Forum
- Comrades in Arms
- Court Of Opinions
- The Craig's
- Cuckoo Clock House
- Days Of Sail
- Don Messer and His Islanders
- Escape with Me
- Fighting Navy
- From Leicester Square to Broadway
- Front Line Family
- The Gillans
- Gilmour's Albums
- The Happy Gang
- Harmony Harbour
- In Search of Ourselves
- Jake and the Kid
- John and Judy
- The Johnny Home Show
- Just Mary
- Laura Limited
- Let's Go to the Music Hall
- L for Lanky
- Kindergarten of the Air
- Maggie Muggins
- Magic Adventures
- Men in Scarlet
- The Merchant Navy Show
- The National Farm Radio Forum
- Now I Ask You
- Opportunity Knocks
- Rawhide
- The Rod and Charles Show
- The Romance of Canada
- Singing Stars of Tomorrow
- The Small Types Club
- Stage
- Stag Party
- Stories Read by John Drainie
- Theatre of Freedom
- This Is the Army
- The Tommy Hunter Show
- Trans-Canada Matinee
- Treasure Trail
- Wayne and Shuster

== Golden Age-emulating Canadian radio programs ==
- Nero Wolfe (a.k.a. Rex Stout's Nero Wolfe)
- Nightfall
- The Vinyl Cafe

== Australian Golden Age programs ==
- Argonauts Club
- Dad and Dave from Snake Gully

== See also ==
- List of films based on radio series
- List of U.S. radio programs
- List of old-time radio people
