= Lee Bell (disambiguation) =

Lee Bell (born 1983) is an English football midfielder.

Lee Bell may also refer to:

- Lee Bell, West Virginia, U.S., unincorporated community in Randolph County
- Lee Phillip Bell (1928–2020), American talk show host
