= Paul Gibson (broadcaster) =

American broadcaster

Paul Gibson (died 1967) was a broadcaster and sales representative for WBBM (AM) radio in Chicago from the 1940s until his death from cancer. He was primarily known as a lecturer, who would broadcast his opinions on multiple subjects as many as four times a day over WBBM.

On June August 4, 1942, Gibson became the third person to have a Housewives' Protective League (HPL) participation program on radio, following Fletcher Wiley in Los Angeles and Galen Drake in San Francisco. By September 1944, his HPL program on WBBM had a higher gross income than those two or a newer one in New York City. Sponsorship of HPL programs was limited to products that received satisfactory results on questionnaires completed by 100 housewives who had tested the products.

Gibson was one of the first broadcasters to take listener phone calls on the air in an early version of today's talk radio format. He also co-hosted a WBBM program in the late 1950s with Lee Phillip entitled The Lady & The Tiger, serving as a chauvanist antagonist to Phillip.
