= Hollywood Star Time =

Hollywood Star Time may refer to:

- Hollywood Star Time (dramatic anthology), a radio dramatic anthology series
- Hollywood Star Time (interview program), a radio interview program
