= List of police radio dramas =

This is a list of police radio dramas.

Dramas involving police procedure, private detectives, and espionage have been a mainstay of programming since the early days of broadcasting. Although police radio dramas reached their popularity during the golden age of radio and were largely displaced by television, they continue to be produced in many parts of the world today.

== # ==
- 21st Precinct (CBS; USA, 1953-1956)

== B ==
- Barrie Craig, Confidential Investigator (NBC; USA, 1951-1955)
- Boston Blackie (NBC; USA, 1944-1950)
- Broadway Is My Beat (CBS; USA, 1949-1954)
- Bulldog Drummond (MBS; USA, 1941-1954)

== C ==
- Calling All Cars (CBS; USA, 1933-1939)
- Casey, Crime Photographer (CBS; USA, 1943-1955)
- Cloak and Dagger (NBC; USA, 1950)
- Counterspy (NBC Blue and MBS; USA, 1942-1957)
- Crime Does Not Pay (USA;WMGM1949-1951, MBS 1952)

== D ==
- Dick Tracy (USA; CBS 1935, MBS 1935–1937, NBC 1938–1939, ABC Blue Network 1943-1948)
- Dixon of Dock Green, remake, (UK; BBC Radio 2005)
- Dragnet (NBC; USA, 1949-1957)
- Gang Busters (NBC, CBS, Blue Network, MBS; USA, 1935-1957)

== I ==
- I Was a Communist for the FBI (Frederick W. Ziv Company; USA, 1952-1953)

== N ==
- Nero Wolfe
- Nick Carter, Master Detective

== P ==
- Pat Novak For Hire
- Perry Mason (CBS; USA, 1943-1955)
- Philip Marlowe

== R ==
- Richard Diamond

== S ==
- Sam Spade
- Speed Gibson of the International Secret Police

== T ==
- Tales of the Texas Rangers
- The Black Museum
- The Green Hornet
- The New Adventures of Sherlock Holmes (Blue Network and Mutual Broadcasting System; USA, 1939-1947)
- This is Your FBI
- Trueman and Riley (BBC; UK, 2002–present)

== Y ==
- Yours Truly, Johnny Dollar (USA, 1949-1962)
