= Mediation Board =

Mediation Board may refer to:

- National Defense Mediation Board, a 1941 U.S. government agency that settled disputes between labor and management
- National Mediation Board, a U.S. government agency that coordinates labor-management relations within the railroad and airline industries
- Mediation Boards Commission, a commission appointed by the Sri Lankan Ministry of Justice to appoint and administer Mediation Boards
- A. L. Alexander's Mediation Board, 1940s radio show
