= Victory Theatre (disambiguation) =

Victory Theatre or Victory Theater may refer to:

- Victory Theater, a theater in Holyoke, Massachusetts
- Victory Theatre, a theater in Evansville, Indiana
- National Theatre, Melbourne, in Melbourne, Australia, which opened in 1920 as the Victory Theatre
- Victoria Theatre (Dayton, Ohio), which re-opened in 1919 as the Victory Theatre
- Victory Theatre, a theatre in Toronto which opened as the Standard Theatre in 1921 and operated as the Victory Theatre (later Victory Burlesque) from 1941 until 1975.
- Victory Theater, a 1942 CBS radio series
- Woodley Theatre, later known as Victory Theatre, in Los Angeles, California

== See also ==
- New Victory Theater in New York City, New York
