= Dick Joy =

American radio and television announcer

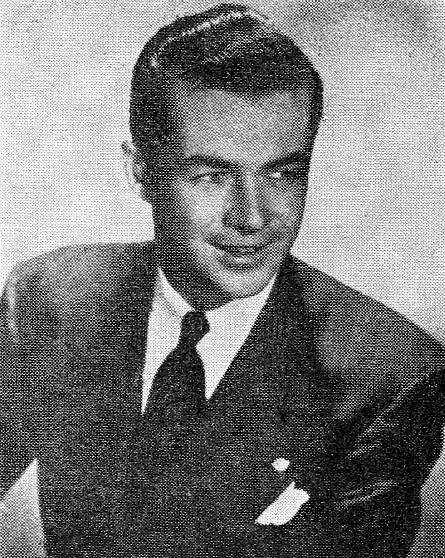
- Dick Joy 1947
- Born: Richard W. Joy; December 28, 1915; Putnam, Connecticut
- Died: October 31, 1991 (aged 75); Medford, Oregon
- Occupations: Radio and television announcer, newscaster

Dick Joy (December 28, 1915 – October 31, 1991) was an American radio and television announcer. A journalism major at the University of Southern California, he went on to become well known on network radio and television.

== Early years ==
Joy's involvement with radio at the local level began when, while a student at USC, he worked part-time for radio stations in Los Angeles, California. His first job after graduation was at KEHE, and he later joined the announcing staff of KNX.

== Radio career ==
At age 21, Joy moved up from the local level to CBS, becoming that network's youngest staff announcer in history. By 1937, he was involved with Kathryn Cravens' News Through a Woman's Eye, Good Afternoon Neighbors, Thomas Conrad Sawyer Series Goodyear Sun-up News, and The Newlyweds. In the following three years, he added to his achievements work on My Secret Ambition, Hollywood in Person, Road of Life, I Want a Divorce, College of Musical Knowledge, Burns and Allen, and The Beauty Explorer.

Joy went on to be the announcer for numerous network radio programs including The Adventures of Bill Lance, The Danny Kaye Show, Forever Ernest, The Sad Sack, Vox Pop, The Adventures of Sam Spade, Blue Ribbon Town, Dr. Kildare. Nelson Eddy Show, Those We Love, Silver Theatre, New Old Gold Show, Jackie Coogan Show, The Saint, and The Danny Thomas Show.

The 1946 edition of Radio Annual reported, "Dick Joy and Donald C. McBain have opened their new station, KCMJ, at Palm Springs." Thus, Joy began his first venture into ownership of a station while continuing to work on network radio. His entry in the "Announcers" section of the 1947 Radio Annual listed 10 network entertainment programs in addition to newscasts. He sold KCMJ in 1950.

== Television career ==
Like many artists from radio, Joy moved to television as that medium grew in popularity. TV programs for which he was the announcer included December Bride, Perry Mason, Have Gun - Will Travel, Daktari, Lost in Space, Gomer Pyle U.S.M.C., Playhouse 90. and Sheriff of Cochise. Radio/television columnist Glen Stadler reported that Joy eventually left television to return to radio "because he refused to act like the advertiser demanded ... using the shove-em-at-you technique." Joy told Stadler, "I don't want any more [until] the advertiser ... admits that the buyer has intelligence."

Returning to local radio in 1951, Joy became news director at KFAC in Los Angeles. Billboard magazine reported that, in addition to being news director, Joy would "handle all morning newscasts and some early afternoon shows."

Joy also worked at two Los Angeles television stations, KTTV and KNXT. He retired in 1969.

== Family ==
Joy had a wife, Cecelia, two daughters, and three grandchildren.
