= Robert Armbruster =

American conductor

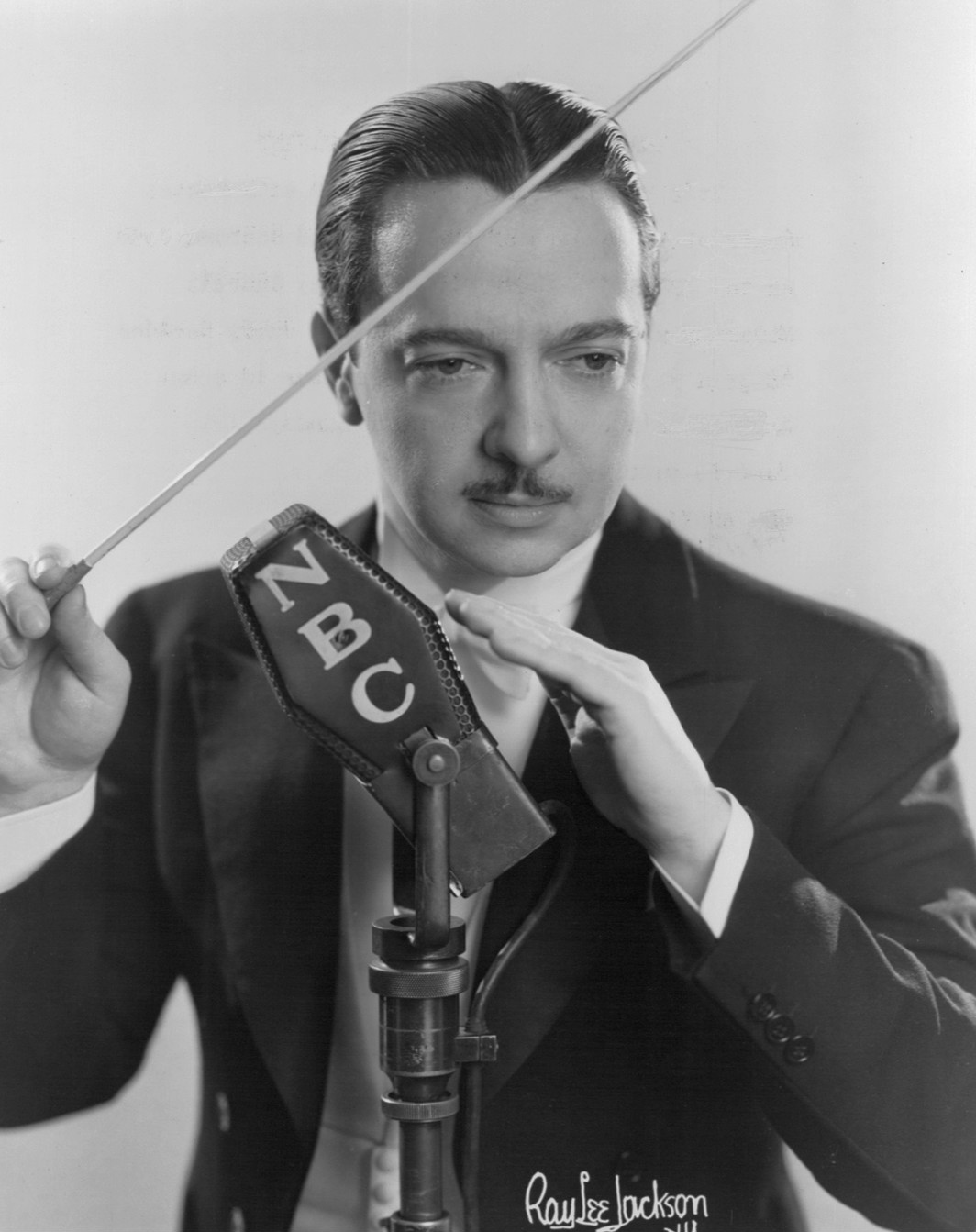
- Born: October 9, 1897; Philadelphia, Pennsylvania, U.S.
- Died: June 20, 1994 (aged 96); Santa Monica, California, U.S.
- Occupations: Composer; conductor; pianist

John Robert Sommers Armbruster (October 9, 1897 – June 20, 1994) was an American composer, conductor, pianist and songwriter. He also recorded piano rolls under the pseudonyms of Henri Bergman, Edwin Gabriel, Robert Romayne, and Robert Summers.

== Biography ==
Armbruster was born in Philadelphia, Pennsylvania. When he was 8 years old, Armbruster began performing professionally in Philadelphia.

After studying with Constantin von Sternberg he became a concert pianist, then branched out into conducting and a composing for radio, then television and film. He debuted as a pianist with the Philadelphia Orchestra at the age of eight. In his teenage years, he started recording piano rolls for the Aeolian Company's Duo-Art reproducing pianos and turned out hundreds of classical and salon-type performances for them. He attracted particular notice as orchestra leader of The Voice of Firestone, the songs "Cuddle Up" and "High Barbaree" and his compositions "Western Ballet" and "Variations in Miniature on Chopsticks".

During the 1940s, Armbruster was the conductor of the NBC Hollywood Orchestra for many charitable specials. Other radio programs on which he worked included Blue Ribbon Time, Blue Ribbon Town, The Cass Daley Show, Cavalcade of America, The Charlie McCarthy Show, Coronet on the Air, Cousin Willie,, The Cuckoo Hour, A Day in the Life of Dennis Day, The Electric Hour, The Great Gildersleeve, The Groucho Marx Show, Hawthorne TBA, The Kraft Music Hall, The Nelson Eddy Show, The Old Gold Program, Red Ryder, Sara's Private Caper, and Western Caravan.

In 1948, Armbruster was musical director, conductor and solo pianist for the Kraft Music Hall program starring Nelson Eddy. A fine pianist, he was featured each week in classical piano solos. The program had an excellent orchestra of about 35. Regular arrangers included Billy May and Nelson Riddle. In the sixties, Armbruster was head of the music department at MGM Studios.

He died in Santa Monica, California on June 20, 1994, at age 97.
