= Anne Jamison (singer) =

American singer (1910–1961)

Anne Jamison (January 24, 1910 – April 16, 1961) was a coloratura soprano who "achieved renown in three different fields — radio, concert, and opera".

== Early years ==
Jamison was born on January 24, 1910, in Belfast, Ireland, the daughter of William Jamison and Roseann Maguire Jamison. She had two sisters. Her father was an officer in the British Army. Her musical abilities were recognized while the family lived in India, where they had moved when she was 4 years old. Her father was stationed at Secunderabad, India. They returned to Ireland after World War I began, and she attended a convent school. Her first public appearance occurred at a charity concert when she was 9 years old.

Jamison's encounter with a dying man in Belfast resulted in the family's departure from Ireland. She was 7 years old when she saw the man and asked him what had happened. His reply included the names of two men who had attacked him. One day later, "members of both groups represented in the killing" were looking for the girl. She was smuggled to an uncle's house in London, but her parents feared that the family would not be safe in England. Therefore, they moved to Canada. Her childhood interest in singing increased after the family moved to Guelph, Ontario, Canada, and she began to study voice seriously. Her father urged her to study, whether she ever became a professional singer or not. He told her, "Even if you have no voice in the professional sense, even if you are just going to sing for your own pleasure all your life, you might as well do it properly. Take lessons to please me."

While she took secretarial classes at a business college in Toronto, she took singing lessons at the Toronto Conservatory of Music. After she graduated from there with first-class honors, the conservatory's president encouraged her to pursue further studies in music. Her concurrent graduation from the business college led to "an intensive period of work and study, study and work" as she lived alone in Toronto. After she had a breakdown, she went to England to recover, and while there she studied with tenor William Shakespeare, who was considered "the outstanding voice teacher of his day". She offset part of her tuition with him by helping him correct proofs of his book, The Speaker's Art. She also studied with Estelle Liebling in New York.

== Career ==
Jamison returned to Canada from London in 1930 and began giving concerts. Soon she received a contract to sing on a radio program, and she subsequently became a star on CFRB radio.

In the summer of 1934, Jamison auditioned for the Palmolive Beauty Box Theater. Director Bill Bacher needed a replacement for Gladys Swarthout, who had notified him that she would be unable to perform as the lead in The Fortune Teller. Six nights and 25 hours of rehearsal later, Jamison filled the role "and sang herself into stardom". Other operettas in which she performed on that program included The Student Prince. In March 1935, immediately after Balcher became director of Hollywood Hotel he signed Jamison to portray Virginia, the love interest of the show's star, Dick Powell. After 2 1/2 years as "Ginny", and after Powell had married Joan Blondell, Jamison was allowed to use her own name on the program.

Jamison joined the cast of Fred Astaire's radio program in October 1936, signed as a regular after she had appeared three times as a guest on the show. In 1946 she co-starred in Summer Electric Hour, a 13-week summer replacement program on CBS radio. She had frequently appeared as a guest on the regular program, The Electric Hour. Other radio programs on which Jamison appeared included Music Hall, Evenings with Romberg, and Joyful and Triumphant. She recorded for RCA, Red Seal, and Decca record labels.

A concert in San Diego in 1937 elicited a favorable review in The San Diego Sun, which described her as a "lass with a delicate air". The review said, "Miss Jamison accomplishes the utmost with a voice capable of great variety of mood and timbre, though not large in volume". Jamison's first New York recital occurred in Town Hall in 1938. She returned to that venue for another concert in January 1941. A review of the latter in The New York Times said that her performance was most satisfactory when she sang softly, but the concert "contained many offerings for which the glassy timber of her tones was little suited".

She also sang with orchestras in Toronto and Portland, the Los Angeles Philharmonic and the San Francisco Opera. A review of her performance an audience of 6,172 in Toronto said, "Few in that dazzling warm-weather crowd ever heard the exquisite aria from Chapentier's opera, Louise, sung with such infinite glory of floating, evanescent tone." It said that Jamison performed "with a voice of absolute purity in tone, perfection in lyric art and blithe spontaneous charm." Her concert in Memphis, Tennessee, in November 1940 "demonstrated the flawless purity of tone and clarity of phrasing of a top-notch lyric soprano" and ended with 10 encores for the audience of 2,000.

== Personal life and death ==
From 1934 on, Jamison considered the United States her home. She became a naturalized citizen. She said that having "seen conditions in other countries" she thought she appreciated living in America more than most people who had been born there. She was "a vigorous believer in exercise" who regularly rode her bicycle at 6 a.m. She supplemented that activity with exercises derived from her father's army training. In 1951 she was chair of the entertainment industry committee as part of a drive to raise $550,000 for a 100-bed addition to the Brothers of St. John of God Hospital in Los Angeles. The facility that served chronically ill and aged people sought to expand from its 33-bed status.

Jamison married Edward C. Calligan, a transportation executive who was her manager, secretly on September 11, 1939, in Kingman, Arizona. The marriage was announced on April 24, 1940. They had two children. She died on April 16, 1961, in Hollywood, California.
