= The General Mills Radio Adventure Theater =

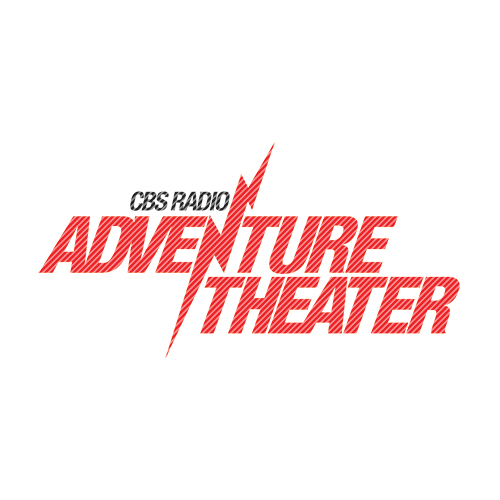
Radio Adventure Theater logo

The General Mills Radio Adventure Theater was an anthology radio drama series with Tom Bosley as host, which aired on the CBS Radio Network in 1977. Himan Brown, already producing the CBS Radio Mystery Theater for the network, added this twice-weekly (Saturdays and Sundays) anthology radio drama series to his workload in 1977. It usually aired on weekends, beginning in February 1977 and continuing through the end of January 1978, on CBS radio affiliates which carried it.

General Mills was looking for a means of reaching children that would be less expensive than television advertising. Brown and CBS were willing to experiment with a series aimed at younger listeners, reaching that audience through ads in comic books. Apart from Christian or other religious broadcasting, this may have been the only nationwide attempt in the U.S. in the 1970s to air such a program.

After the 52 episodes had first aired over twenty-six weekends (February 1977 through July 1977) General Mills did not continue as sponsor. The series of 52 episodes, titled The CBS Radio Adventure Theater, was then rebroadcast from August 1977 through the end of January 1978, with a variety of other sponsors.

== Listen to ==
- Daniel, The Oracle 77-07-31
