= The Electric Hour =

American old-time radio program of popular music

- Genre: Popular music
- Running time: 30 minutes
- Country of origin: United States
- Language: English
- Syndicates: CBS
- Starring: Nelson Eddy
- Announcer: Frank Graham
- Produced by: Charles Herbert
- Original release: September 20, 1944 – June 9, 1946

The Electric Hour is an American old-time radio program of popular music. It was broadcast on CBS from September 20, 1944, to June 9, 1946.

== Format ==
Nelson Eddy starred in The Electric Hour, and each episode featured a guest star who sang duets with him. Genres featured included music from films, folk songs, and "ballads from many lands". Gail Lulay, Eddy's biographer, wrote in Nelson Eddy, America's Favorite Baritone: An Authorized Biographical Tribute, "This was Nelson's dream show because it had a musical format." Lulay added that the program contained "some of Nelson's best music".

== Site ==
The program initially originated from CBS Columbia Square in Hollywood, California. Effective with the September 16, 1945, installment, it moved to the Walt Disney Studios in Burbank, California. A report in the trade publication Billboard said that the change was caused by "acute studio space shortage at CBS".

== Personnel ==
Eddy was the only regular featured performer on The Electric Hour. Guests included Jeanette MacDonald, who performed with Eddy in films. Instrumental music was provided by Robert Armbruster's orchestra, and Armbruster's chorus provided vocal support. Frank Graham was the announcer, and Charles Herbert was the producer.

== Sponsor ==
The program's title came from its sponsor, a group of electric utilities across the United States. The organization had the slogan "local electric companies — all producing power for America under American business management." The number of participating utilities was 167 in 1945.

== Summer versions ==
In 1945, 1946, and 1947, the same sponsors presented The Electric Hour Summer Series as replacements for regular programs. Dates and featured artists, which varied from year to year, are listed below:

- July 8, 1945 - September 9, 1945 — Francia White and Felix Knight
- June 9, 1946 - September 22, 1946 — Anne Jamison, Bob Shanley, and the Sportsmen Quartet
- July 13, 1947 - August 31, 1947 — Woody Herman, Peggy Lee, and Dave Barbour's orchestra
