= Victory Parade (radio series) =

1942 radio series

- Genre: Radio programs
- Running time: 30 minutes
- Country of origin: United States
- Home station: NBC Radio
- Hosted by: Lionel Barrymore
- Original release: June 7 – August 23, 1942
- No. of series: 1
- No. of episodes: 12
- Audio format: mono

Victory Parade is a radio series that was broadcast through the summer of 1942 by NBC Radio. It was developed in cooperation with the U.S. government's Office of Facts and Figures, an agency which at the time was in the process of being consolidated under the Office of War Information. A similar series, airing on CBS Radio and titled Victory Theater, was also developed at the same time. Both series were the networks' contribution to the World War II war effort. The shows encouraged the American public to support the war effort and to buy war bonds.

Each week Victory Parade aired a special version of one of NBC's well-known prime time series. The facilities and the services of the actors and crew were supplied at no charge to the government. The usual commercials were replaced by government messaging. The artists who participated on these shows received "V-for-Victory" silver pins.

Initially Victory Parade served as the summer replacement for The Jack Benny Program. In July, it began airing a half-hour earlier, in The Great Gildersleeve's usual timeslot. This move made room for the new summer series The Remarkable Miss Tuttle, starring Edna May Oliver. Lionel Barrymore was the host of Victory Parade, serving as the "Voice of the Government". The series ran for twelve weeks.

== List of episodes ==
Broadcast date	Participamts / programs	Length	Details / citations
1942-06-07	Baby Snooks	30 minutes	Cast of Maxwell House Coffee Time. Fanny Brice as Baby Snooks, with Frank Morgan, John Conte and Meredith Willson's Orchestra
1942-06-14	Red Skelton	30 minutes	Red Skelton with the cast of his The Raleigh Cigarette Program. Note: This substituted for the previously planned episode of Mr. District Attorney, which would eventually air July 19th
1942-06-21	The Rudy Vallée Show	30 minutes	Rudy Vallée, joined by Charles Laughton. Groucho Marx, Gloria Warren and Joan Davis. Songs Included "We're Taking Off" and "Song of the Vagabonds"
1942-06-28	George Burns and Gracie Allen	30 minutes	George Burns, Gracie Allen, and the cast of The Burns and Allen Show, including Clarence Nash as Herman the Duck, with Paul Whiteman and his Orchestra
1942-07-05	Edgar Bergen and Charlie McCarthy	30 minutes	Edgar Bergen and his dummy Charlie McCarthy, with the cast of The Chase and Sanborn Program, including Don Ameche, Janet Blair and Ray Noble's orchestra Note: Victory Parade was now airing a half-hour earlier, making way for the summer series The Remarkable Miss Tuttle
1942-07-12	Fibber McGee and Molly	30 minutes	Jim Jordan and Marian Jordan, with Gale Gordon as Mayor LaTrivia, Bill Thompson as The Old Timer, Isabel Randolph as Mrs. Uppington, the Billy Mills Orchestra and the singing group, the King's Men
1942-07-19	Mr. District Attorney	30 minutes	Jay Jostyn and Vicki Vola in "The Case of the Whispered Word"
1942-07-26	The Great Gildersleeve	30 minutes	Harold Peary starring as Throckmorton P. Gildersleeve, and cast.
1942-08-02	Bob Hope	30 minutes	Bob Hope at March Field air force base in California. The cast of The Pepsodent Show, including Jerry Colonna, Barbara Jo Allen as Vera Vague, Frances Langford, the singing group Six Hits and a Miss and the John Scott Trotter Orchestra
1942-08-09	Kollege of Musical Knowledge	30 minutes	"The Ol' Professor" Kay Kyser and his musical "students".
1942-08-16	Truth or Consequences	30 minutes	Game show host Ralph Edwards at Mitchel Field air force base in Long Island, New York. Cadets were selected as the participants
1942-08-23	The Jack Benny Program	30 minutes	Jack Benny and his cast, including Dennis Day, Mary Livingstone, Don Wilson and Eddie "Rochester" Anderson. Meredith Willson and his orchestra substituting for the touring Phil Harris

Note: A special episode of The Aldrich Family was reportedly also planned, but did not get produced.
