= Lee Bell, West Virginia =

Lee Bell
- Unincorporated community
- Location within the state of West Virginia Lee Bell (the United States)
- Coordinates: 38°40′58″N 80°0′20″W
- Country: United States
- State: West Virginia
- County: Randolph
- Elevation: 2,070 ft (630 m)
- Time zone: UTC-5 (Eastern (EST))
  - Summer (DST): UTC-4 (EDT)
- GNIS ID: 1551761

Lee Bell is an unincorporated community in Randolph County, West Virginia, United States. It was reportedly named after Leander "Lee" Bell who was born in 1885 in Joker, Calhoun County, West Virginia.
