= The Jack Berch Show =

1935-1954 radio variety/talk program

- Other names: Jack Berch and His Boys; The Kitchen Pirate; The Sweetheart Serenader
- Genre: Variety and talk
- Country of origin: United States
- Language: English
- Syndicates: ABC; CBS; Mutual; NBC
- Announcer: Joe Bier; Eddie Dunn; Ed Herlihy; John Reed King
- Written by: Howard Blake; Dick Charles
- Directed by: Dick Charles; Henry Hull, Jr. Herb Leder
- Produced by: Robert Ross Smith
- Original release: 1935 – 1954
- Sponsored by: Fels Naptha Soap; Gulfspray Insect Killer; Kellogg; Prudential Insurance; Sweetheart Soap

The Jack Berch Show is a radio variety/talk program in the United States. It was broadcast on ABC, CBS, Mutual, and NBC at various times 1935–1954. The program at times went by other names, including The Kitchen Pirate (1935–36) and The Sweetheart Serenader (1939-1941).

== Format ==
The Berch programs featured "light music and informal chatter. When housewives tired of listening to the tribulations of their soap opera characters, they turned for relief to the songs of Berch."

Berch usually began his program with a whistle and a song. In an article in the January 1949 issue of Radio and Television Mirror, he gave the reason for that: "I was reading the morning paper. Suddenly I realized that the whole front page was full of disaster -- fires, murders, political troubles, jealousy and strife between persons and between nations. ... 'Now,' I said to myself, 'something ought to be done about this. And, in my own small way, I'm the guy to do it.' Then and there, in theory at least, the Heart to Heart Hookup and the Good Neighbor Club came into being."

The Heart to Heart Hookup and the Good Neighbor Club were features of Berch's program. Heart to Heart Hookup featured Berch reading "letters dedicated to the encouragement of more unfortunate people in the world." The Good Neighbor Club highlighted good deeds sent in by the program's listeners.

In that same article, Berch wrote: "There's a certain informality about the Jack Berch Show. We like to think of ourselves as coming into your living room for a visit every morning ... you'd get pretty tired of stiff and formal guests every day, wouldn't you?" The program featured a variety of types of songs, "from the old favorites to the latest popular tunes from Tin Pan Alley.

The show's ability to not only entertain listeners but to prompt them to act was demonstrated in 1950. After a listener wrote to Berch requesting used Christmas cards for a project, NBC received more than 5 million Christmas cards.

== Reviews ==
A review in the April 20, 1937, issue of the trade publication Radio Daily commented: "Berch offers an enjoyable program of singing and chatting that is well geared to appeal to the feminine ears. Jack's style is friendly, and he slips in the commercial remarks in a manner that makes them easy to take."

Another comment in the same publication four months later said, "The singing of Berch is particularly well designed to give the day a sunny sendoff." On the other hand, a 1943 comment in the trade publication Billboard described Berch's program as "strictly a long quarter-hour of flimsy whimsy."

== Personnel ==
Musicians heard on the programs included Jerry Colonna, Raymond Scott, Johnny Williams, Nick Tagg, John Gart, Carl Kress, Sammy Prager, Mark Warnow, Charles Magnante, Tony Mottola, and George Wright.

Ed Herlihy, John Reed King, Eddie Dunn, and Joe Bier were the announcers.

Dick Charles was both writer and director for the program. Other directors included Herb Leder and Henry Hull, Jr. Other writers included Howard Blake. Robert Ross Smith was a producer.

== Schedule ==
The broadcast schedule of The Jack Berch Show varied widely during its time on the air. The table below gives pertinent information.

Years	Days	Network	Sponsor
1935-1936	Fridays	Blue	NA
1936-1937	MWF	Mutual	Wasey Products Corporation
1937	MWF	CBS	Fels Naphtha Soap
1937	Thrice weekly	Mutual	NA
1939-1940	Twice weekly	NBC	NA
1939	MWF	Blue	Sweetheart Soap
1939-1940	Twice weekly	Mutual	NA
1941	Tuesday/Thursday	Station WHP	Gulfspray Insect Killer
1943-1944	Weekdays	Mutual	Kellogg
1944-1946	Weekdays	ABC	Prudential Insurance
1946-1951	Weekdays	NBC	Prudential Insurance
1951-1954	Various days	ABC	Prudential Insurance

Source: The Encyclopedia of Old-Time Radio, except as noted.
