= Speed Gibson of the International Secret Police =

Radio series

Speed Gibson of the International Secret Police was a radio adventure series written by Virginia Cooke. It was centered on the adventures of Speed Gibson, a fifteen-year-old pilot who, through his uncle Clint Barlow, becomes a member of the International Secret Police. Speed was described as "a typical American boy: interested in short wave radio, aviation and most of all—The International Secret Police."

== The show ==
Speed Gibson of the International Secret Police ran weekly from January 2, 1937, to May 25, 1940. 178 Episodes of the show were produced with each episode lasting approximately fifteen minutes. Elliott Lewis may have starred in the title role of Speed Gibson but this cannot be confirmed. It is believed by some that Lewis played Splinters, one of the Octopus' henchmen. Howard McNear played his uncle Clint Barlow, and John Gibson played his sidekick, Barney Dunlap, known for using such catch phrases as "Suffering wangdoodles!" Other voice actors contributing to the series were Gale Gordon as The Octopus, Hanley Stafford, Jack Mathers, Victor Rodman and Sam Edwards. The opening theme contained the drone of an airplane and the voice of an air traffic controller urgently calling, "Ceiling zero … ceiling zero … ceiling zero!"

The series was divided into two stories. The first 100 episodes cover The Menace of the Octopus. They highlight Speed's induction into the International Secret Police and the subsequent pursuit of the Octopus and his gang throughout the Orient. The remaining 78 shows are titled Speed Gibson And The Atlantian Syndicate. This series follows Speed as he continues his adventures on the African continent and his quest to defeat the Octopus.

The series is notable in that all 178 episodes have survived intact.

== See also ==
- Old-time radio
- List of old-time radio programs
