= Good Will Hour =

American human-interest radio program (1937–1953)

Good Will Hour was an American human interest radio program that was broadcast primarily on the Mutual Broadcasting System beginning on August 1, 1937, and (after some hiatuses) ending on January 4, 1953. In its later years on the air it was known as The John J. Anthony Program,

== Background ==
After John J. Anthony's first marriage ended in divorce, a dispute regarding alimony resulted in his being sentenced to Alimony Jail. Those experiences led to his founding of the Marital Relations Institute, which "was a marginal operation" until he created the Good Will Hour. Following its radio exposure of his approach to marital problems, fees for his advice in the Institute rose from $5 to $25. Four years before Good Will Hour, Anthony had a similar program on a New York radio station. Ask Mr. Anthony was "dedicated to helping the sufferers from an antiquated and outmoded domestic relations code".

Good Will Hour can be considered to have filled a programming gap created by the departure of Goodwill Court, which ended after the New York Bar Association raised objections about host A. L. Alexander's dispensing of legal advice. Radio executives liked that program's appeal "in its attempt to aid the downtrodden". When Good Will Hour debuted locally in New York City prior to its gaining network distribution, the trade publication Variety said, "WMCA brought back the Good Will Court idea in a new dressing ..."

== Overview ==
Anthony was the host of the Good Will Hour, and the program's opening line was, "Mr. Anthony, I have a problem." He dealt with problems presented by guests in the studio and those sent in by mail. The program received hundreds of letters weekly, with Anthony responding to "several dozen" during the broadcast. Many of the problems addressed on the program related to marriage, either people already married or those thinking about marrying.

Newspaper advertisements for the program invited listeners to tune in for the revelation of people's personal marital problems. One example is an October 23, 1938, ad that began with bold, all-caps type saying, "He can't forget my past!" A picture beneath that headline showed Anthony and a woman facing each other on either side of a microphone. Below the picture a block of text said:

"If I even look at another man, he goes crazy! I love him — but his jealousy is driving me wild. What can I do?" Listen tonight to a dozen cases as heart-stirring as this, on radio's startling Good Will Hour. Hear real people without rehearsal tell their most intimate personal problems to John J. Anthony, noted radio counselor. His expert advice may help you, too.

The rest of the ad invited readers to listen, giving the call letters of the station, the time, and the name of the sponsor.

Anthony used a brisk, businesslike approach as he gave advice on the air, often urging people who sought help to hurry along with their questions or problems. He described his approach on the program as applying "humane, understanding treatment". The show had no studio audience. Guests were usually overbooked in case some might not show up for the broadcast. As a result, some people who were scheduled for the show did not get on the air because of time limitations. Anthony stayed after each broadcast ended to talk with them and advise them about their problems.

== Production ==
The Good Will Hour had a weekly audience of 20 million people. In 1939 it was carried on more than 700 stations. It originated from station WMCA in New York City. Directors included John Loveton. Announcers included Jack Rourke.

== Broadcast schedule ==
Good Will Hour debuted locally on WMCA in New York City on January 24, 1937. Its network broadcasts are shown in the table below.

Network Broadcast Schedule of Good Will Hour
Beginning Date	Ending Date	Network	Day	Starting Time	Length	Sponsor
August 1, 1937	January 1938	Mutual	Sunday	10 p.m. Eastern Time	30 minutes	McFadden Publications
January 1938	April 14, 1940	Mutual	Sunday	10 p.m. E. T.	1 hour	Ironized Yeast
April 21, 1940	October 10, 1943	Blue	Sunday	10 p.m. E. T.	1 hour	Ironized Yeast
December 5, 1943	November 26, 1944	Mutual	Sunday	10:15 p.m. E. T.	45 minutes	Clark gum
March 19, 1945 (The John J. Anthony Program)	December 27, 1946	Mutual	Monday-Friday	1:45 p.m. E. T.	15 minutes	Carter products
December 9, 1951 (The John J. Anthony Program)	January 4, 1953	Mutual	Sunday	9:30 p.m. E. T.	30 minutes	Sterling Drugs

Notes:

- The program was also broadcast in 1945 and 1947, but details are not available.
- In 1949 the program was broadcast locally on WMGM in New York City.

== Critical response ==
Jeanne Yount wrote in the Oregon Journal that the Good Will Hour might help people who sought advice on it, but the show was "hardly soothing or restful to home listeners". She felt that the words of Anthony's "message of the week", with which he ended each episode, might be true, but they also were trite.

In February 1943, The Bridgeport Herald printed what the trade publication Billboard called "a five-column exposé" of the program. The story related the experience of reporter Eugenia Boisseau, who had appeared on the program as Janet Woods with a fabricated problem of being unable to handle a situation of loving two men. Boisseau wrote:

Pilgrims to the mecca of marital muddles soon discover they are faced with an ordeal for which they have not bargained, but all exlts are blocked by the subtle strategy ot Mr. A. and his tall, smartly groomed secretary. High Priest Anthony officiates at the final rites, drawing blood, then dealing the death blow with a few swift verbal lashes.

== Lawsuit ==
Lawrence Swors sued Anthony on April 19, 1938, seeking a share of the program's profits. The suit filed in New York Supreme Court said that Swors suggested the show's concept to Anthony in May 1936, and Anthony agreed to share profits. After the show began on WMCA, The Knickerbocker Broadcasting Company (operators of the station) initially paid Swors $25 for each broadcast and later raised the amount to $50 per week. Anthony said that he paid $1,250 to Swors, but that the two men mutually canceled their agreement in July 1937. The suit sought half of Anthony's income from sponsorships by McFadden Publications and Ironized Yeast.

== Television ==
What's Your Problem?, which The New York Times described as "a video version of The Good Will Hour", debuted on WPIX on July 24, 1949. Four or five people appeared in each half-hour episode to "recount their troubles to Mr. Anthony and a jury who will propose possible solutions". Those with problems were not identified; cameras focused on the backs of their necks to avoid showing their faces.

== Adaptations ==
In 1937 Mateel Farnham wrote the novel Ex-Love based on Anthony's work on Good Will Hour. Radio Mirror magazine published short stories in 1945 that were adapted from problems presented on Good Will Hour. They included:

- "Sixteen" (January 1945)
- "Second Chance" (February 1945)
- "The Right Girl" (March 1945)

Each story was accompanied by this statement:

John J. Anthony symbolizes to those who have problems which seem too great for solution, a kindly, intelligent, sympathetic listener. That is the purpose of the Good Will Hour. Mr. Anthony is an able domestic relations counsellor as well as a humanitarian, so that his advice combines authenticity with common sense. For drama that is exciting and heart-warming because it is true, listen for the Hour, Sundays at 10:00 P.M. EWT over Mutual.

In June 1949 Anthony presented a version of the program in personal appearances in theaters in Brooklyn and Long Island. Unlike the anyonymity of the radio broadcasts, participants were spotlighted on stage.
