= Forever Ernest =

American radio sitcom (1946)

- Genre: Situation comedy
- Country of origin: United States
- Language(s): English
- Syndicates: CBS
- Starring: Jackie Coogan; Lurene Tuttle; Arthur Q. Bryan
- Announcer: Dick Joy
- Written by: Rupert Pray; Leonard Soll; Daved DeKoven
- Directed by: Harry Kronman
- Produced by: John Guedel
- Original release: April 29 – July 22, 1946
- Sponsored by: Bromo-Seltzer

Forever Ernest is an American old-time radio situation comedy. It was broadcast on CBS from April 29, 1946, to July 22, 1946, replacing Vox Pop on the CBS schedule. It was also carried on CFRB in Canada.

Ernest, the title character, is a shy, fearful clerk at a pharmacy. He goes out of his way to help people — an attribute that his girlfriend, Candy, wishes he would change, because she thinks people take advantage of him. Most episodes focus on Ernest's attempts to please Candy. The other main character is fast-talking Duke, Ernest's friend who often gets him into trouble.

In his first regular role on radio, Jackie Coogan played the title character, with Lurene Tuttle as Candy and Arthur Q. Bryan as Duke. Dick Joy was the announcer. Harry Kronman was the director, and John Guedel was the producer. Billy May and his orchestra provided the music. Rupert Pray, Leonard Soll, and Daved DeKoven were the writers.

Forever Ernest was sponsored by Bromo-Seltzer.
