= Blair of the Mounties =

1930s radio series

- Running time: 15 minutes
- Country of origin: United States
- Language: English
- Syndicates: Syndicated
- Starring: Colonel Rhys Davies; Jack Abbott
- Written by: Colonel Rhys Davies
- Directed by: G. Donald Gray
- Produced by: Walter Biddick Co.
- Original release: 1934 – 1957 (last known date)
- No. of episodes: 39

Blair of the Mounties is a syndicated 15-minute radio series about the adventures of Sergeant James Blair of the North-West Mounted Police. A total of 39 episodes of this Northern genre series were produced. The show was heard on radio stations for more than twenty years. An Oakland, California radio station broadcast it in July 1934 and a 1957 issue of Broadcasting magazine listed Blair of the Mounties as still being available for release to radio stations.

== Writer and main actor ==
Colonel Rhys Davies was the series writer, as well as the actor who portrayed Blair. He had served in the North-West Mounted Police during the Yukon gold rush and then transferred to the British military intelligence service during the First World War. Davies based the series on his own experiences as a Canadian Mountie, and as a member of the British Intelligence Corps.

In addition to his law enforcement and military service Davies wrote both radio scripts and novels.

== Series premise ==
Sergeant (later Inspector) James Blair, played by Colonel Rhys Davies, served in various Canadian locations, including Dawson City and near Hudson's Bay Company fur trading posts. He was often assisted by Corporal Marshal, played by Jack Abbott. Blair also spent time in Great Britain, where he helped solve crimes.

A newspaper article said that the series was of special interest to citizens near Regina, Saskatchewan, for not only was Regina the western headquarters for the R.C.M.P., but also because several Saskatchewan and other western cities and towns are mentioned in the radio program.

The series had few sound effects, and one reviewer stated that the writing was amateurish, and "the actor playing Blair comes off as a trifle stuffy", though another source describes it as a "fascinating series" based on Colonel Davies' lifetime of exciting adventures.

== Distribution ==
Blair of the Mounties was broadcast in the United States (including what was then the Territory of Hawaii), Canada and Australia. It was originally distributed by Walter Biddick Co. of Los Angeles, California, but in 1937 the series was sold to United Broadcasting Sales Ltd. of Calgary, Alberta. A newspaper article claimed that the series was "exceptionally popular."

In 1949 the series was available to individual stations as a 15-minute, three times a week show. The broadcasting price per episode was $5, amounting to $15 a week. In 1957 United Broadcasting Sales Ltd. was offering Blair of the Mounties to four western providences in Canada.

== Episodes ==
No.	Title	Directed by	Written by	Original release date
1	"Fire Valley"	G. Donald Grey	Colonel Rhys Davies	TBA
Blair recalls how, 30 years ago, native tribe members said that Corporal Leslie was stolen by ghosts. Over in England Leslie's mother had a dream about where her son was.
2	"Incident at Long Coulee"	G. Donald Grey	Colonel Rhys Davies	TBA
A lady fur trapper is robbed, and the crooks have a long head start. Can a chinook warmup help Blair gain time?
3	"The Trap"	G. Donald Grey	Colonel Rhys Davies	TBA
4	"The Murder of Bady"	G. Donald Grey	Colonel Rhys Davies	TBA
5	"The Phantom Sniper"	G. Donald Grey	Colonel Rhys Davies	TBA
A man was shot and killed, but there are only bear tracks near the crime scene.
6	"The Murder at Haggets Landing"	G. Donald Grey	Colonel Rhys Davies	TBA
One of a pair of fur thieves spares a woman and baby from freezing. His partner kills him for being soft, and Blair is determined to bring in the murderer.
7	"The Cedar Lake Mystery"	G. Donald Grey	Colonel Rhys Davies	TBA
When a doctor, his wife, and a friend are on vacation the wife plots to kill her husband.
8	"The Hamilton Mystery - Part 1"	G. Donald Grey	Colonel Rhys Davies	TBA
Blair is on leave in England for 3 months, visiting his sister, and gets involved in a murder. All evidence points to Mrs. Hamilton as the killer, but Blair states she couldn't be guilty.
9	"The Hamilton Mystery - Part 2"	G. Donald Grey	Colonel Rhys Davies	TBA
Blair learns Mrs. Hamilton is now nearly blind in her right eye. Why does a witness claim Mrs. Hamilton was seen with a rifle held against her right shoulder?
10	"The Cherry Hill Mystery - Part 1"	G. Donald Grey	Colonel Rhys Davies	TBA
While Blair is still in England an innocent man will be hanged if Blair can't discover how two men were shot without the aid of bullets or a gun.
11	"The Cherry Hill Mystery - Part 2"	G. Donald Grey	Colonel Rhys Davies	TBA
The murders took place near the home of a professor who is an expert on ancient weapons. Is the professor connected to the crimes?
12	"The Train Wreckers Mystery"	G. Donald Grey	Colonel Rhys Davies	TBA
In 1914 Blair saves a troop train from sabotage.
13	"The Case of Lieutenant Ralston"	G. Donald Grey	Colonel Rhys Davies	TBA
In 1915 Blair is in the front lines fighting the enemy. How is a spy sending messages to the Germans?
14	"The Naked Truth"	G. Donald Grey	Colonel Rhys Davies	TBA
Two bank robbers take refuge with a religious group of Russians.
15	"The Clover Creek Mystery - Part 1"	G. Donald Grey	Colonel Rhys Davies	TBA
A man is assumed to have died by accidental drowning, but Corporal Marshal discovers his boat had been rigged with partially cut-through boards.
16	"The Clover Creek Mystery - Part 2"	G. Donald Grey	Colonel Rhys Davies	TBA
Was a drowned man killed by his brother? Many think so, but Blair has other ideas.
17	"The Kittilak Lagoon Mystery - Part 1"	G. Donald Grey	Colonel Rhys Davies	TBA
Blair and Marshal have a plainclothes assignment of breaking up a drug smuggling ring.
18	"The Kittilak Lagoon Mystery - Part 2"	G. Donald Grey	Colonel Rhys Davies	TBA
Blair looks for drug smuggling evidence and decides to break into a home.
19	"The Robbery at the Canada Western - Part 1"	G. Donald Grey	Colonel Rhys Davies	TBA
A former mountie is now a nighttime bank guard accused of bank robbery. He claims a man with an alibi in another town was at the bank right before the robbery was discovered.
20	"The Robbery at the Canada Western - Part 2"	G. Donald Grey	Colonel Rhys Davies	TBA
Blair questions the bank guard, and believes his claim that the man with an alibi was at the bank.
21	"The Goose Lake Robbery"	G. Donald Grey	Colonel Rhys Davies	TBA
Blair tells a story from 1899. There was a gold robbery, and a duck hunter found empty gold bags sunk in a lake. But where is the gold?
22	"Star Ruby of Talangor - Part 1"	G. Donald Grey	Colonel Rhys Davies	TBA
A visiting Malaysian Prince is murdered, his servant is missing, and a priceless ruby is stolen.
23	"Star Ruby of Talangor - Part 2"	G. Donald Grey	Colonel Rhys Davies	TBA
The stolen ruby had been taken from a Buddhist temple. Was that why the Prince was murdered, or was there another reason?
24	"Ching Wo the Baker"	G. Donald Grey	Colonel Rhys Davies	TBA
Blair remembers the case of a miserly Chinese man who had all his gold dust stolen. The man thought the baker he paid low wages to took it, but most of the townspeople discover the truth before the mounties do.
25	"Strange Case Of Henry Peterson"	G. Donald Grey	Colonel Rhys Davies	TBA
Blair has retired to a farm in Fraser Valley but Sergeant Rafferty captures the thieves from a long-ago crime.
26	"The Return Of Inspector Blair"	G. Donald Grey	Colonel Rhys Davies	TBA
Blair is still retired, and he's married. He is asked for help in investigating if an assumed suicide of a wealthy man was actually murder.
27	"The Feminine Touch - Part 1"	G. Donald Grey	Colonel Rhys Davies	TBA
Blair and his wife, Margery, move to London, and he becomes a private investigator. An actress is murdered, her fiancé is accused, and Blair is hired to help the defense.
28	"The Feminine Touch - Part 2"	G. Donald Grey	Colonel Rhys Davies	TBA
Margery Blair reads a mystery novel where the butler did it, and wants to help her husband by finding a clue that the actress' servant is guilty.
29	"Lord Waverton's Dilemma - Part 1"	G. Donald Grey	Colonel Rhys Davies	TBA
Blair is still a private investigator. Lord Waverton wounded two men who tried to break into his safe. They may have wanted military air defense secrets. A doctor was kidnapped to treat a wounded man, and another wounded man was dropped from a plane and killed.
30	"Lord Waverton's Dilemma - Part 2"	G. Donald Grey	Colonel Rhys Davies	TBA
Blair and the doctor visit a suspect with 2 airplanes, and the doctor finds a clue showing he had been taken there to treat the wounded man. A spy tries to blackmail Waverton.
31	"Lord Waverton's Dilemma - Part 3"	G. Donald Grey	Colonel Rhys Davies	TBA
Lord Waverton had married a young widow, but is her first spouse actually dead? Lady Waverton comes to Blair with her own tale of blackmail. Will Lord Waverton put love before his country?
32	"The Disappearance of Alexander Pressman"	G. Donald Grey	Colonel Rhys Davies	TBA
When Blair is vacationing in England a wealthy man who'd cheated all his partners disappears. Would justice be served by arresting the suspects?
33	"The Most Famous Spy"	G. Donald Grey	Colonel Rhys Davies	TBA
Blair is in London and tells a reporter about Mata Hari, a World War I spy.
34	"The Ibex Mystery - Part 1"	G. Donald Grey	Colonel Rhys Davies	TBA
There was a gold robbery on the English Channel when a ship's engines failed. Cipher messages came from near the area, perhaps from a submarine. A machine gun is shot at Blair.
35	"The Ibex Mystery - Part 2"	G. Donald Grey	Colonel Rhys Davies	TBA
The machine gunner was wearing green clothing, the same as thieves at a 2nd gold robbery. Blair believes the thefts are being done by a country, and he is able to decipher the cipher code.
36	"The Ibex Mystery - Part 3"	G. Donald Grey	Colonel Rhys Davies	TBA
A cipher message tells the next ship to be robbed. Military submarines will be used to try to capture the thieves. Can the stolen gold be found?
37	TBA	TBA	TBA	TBA
38	TBA	TBA	TBA	TBA
39	TBA	TBA	TBA	TBA
