= Galen Drake =

American broadcaster (1905/1906 - 1989)

Galen Drake (born Foster Purcell Rucker; 1905 or 1906 - June 30, 1989) was an American broadcaster whose programs provided "homespun philosophy and observations, aimed mainly at housewives" for more than 20 years.

== Early years ==
Drake was born Foster Purcell Rucker in Kokomo, Indiana, the son of Theodore and Flora Rucker. In addition to an older sibling, he had three half-siblings who were adults when he was born. He moved to Long Beach, California, when he was young. He began taking vocal lessons at age 10, eventually becoming a concert singer. He also was a symphony conductor. He graduated from Long Beach Polytechnic High School, and he pursued medical studies at UCLA but left that program because he had to go to work.

== Career ==
Drake began working in radio at KFOX in Long Beach while he was a high school student. He continued working there after he finished high school, and he directed plays at Long Beach Community Playhouse.

In 1939 Drake became host on programming of The Housewives' Protective League (HPL) on radio station KNX in Los Angeles. He replaced Fletcher Wiley, the founder of HPL, who had recruited him for that role. Drake went on to have an HPL program in San Francisco, and in 1944 he moved to New York. Also in 1944, Radio Life magazine's editorial board selected Drake as the person having the "most convincing microphone voice" when the magazine presented its first distinguished achievement awards.

By November 1949 he had a Monday-Friday program on ABC Radio and two Monday-Friday programs on radio station WCBS. He also had two Saturday programs on WCBS. His handling of commercials was similar to that of Arthur Godfrey. He used a "conversational, spontaneous manner" when he promoted products, working from notes rather than reading from a script.

Although HPL headquarters provided scripts for commentators, Drake said that he ad-libbed content from his own notes, using material from his 10,000-book personal library. He sought to make his commentaries sound conversational. Toward that end, he entered the studio fewer than five minutes before each episode was to begin, "clutching only the sparsest of notes."

Drake's programs touched on a variety of topics. The Museum of Broadcast Communications Encyclopedia of Radio commented, "For example, on one broadcast in 1947 he dealt with night vision, the effect of emotions on driving, mountain climbing, inventors, and juvenile delinquency."

On January 12, 1957, Drake began a television program, This Is Galen Drake, on ABC. It ended on May 11, 1957. Also known as The Galen Drake Show, the series was broadcast at 7 p.m. Eastern Time on Saturdays. Episodes featured Drake's biography of a featured guest, songs by Stuart Foster and Rita Ellis, and a debate on a current topic. Best Foods was the sponsor.

In 1959 Drake moved to WOR radio in New York City, from which his program was carried on the Mutual Broadcasting System.

=== Name ===
Newspaper columnist Ben Gross publicized Drake's real name for the first time in October 1947.

The name "Galen Drake" came with the job at HPL and "was for years under complete control of The Housewives Protective League" and later CBS after it bought that entity and made HPL a CBS subsidiary. Rucker eventually had his name changed legally to Galen Drake.

A problem arose in 1959 when Drake decided to leave CBS to work for radio station WOR. He had agreed in 1953 that if he used his name professionally other than for CBS, he would pay a percentage of his gross income to CBS. With the move to WOR looming, he negotiated with CBS to pay a flat fee for use of the name in lieu of the specified percentage. The network initially wanted $25,000, but Drake refused to pay that amount. The two parties finally agreed on $7,500.

== Later years, personal life and death ==
Drake had a daughter and a son. He went back to Long Beach in the mid-1960s. While there he made some commercials and acted in the syndicated radio drama Heartbeat Theater for The Salvation Army. He died of lung cancer on June 30, 1989, in Long Beach, California, aged 83.
