= Lee Phillip Bell =

American screenwriter (1928–2020)

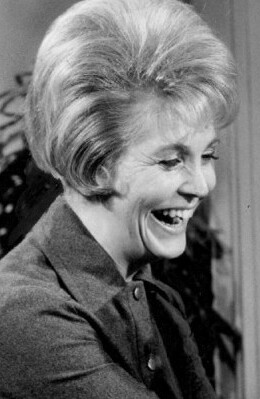
- Bell in 1970
- Born: Loreley June Phillip; June 10, 1928; Chicago, Illinois, US
- Died: February 25, 2020 (aged 91); Beverly Hills, California, US
- Education: Northwestern University
- Occupations: Journalist; Television host; Soap opera creator, writer, and producer
- Years active: 1952–2020
- Known for: The Lee Phillip Show (1952–86); The Bold and the Beautiful; The Young and the Restless
- Spouse: William J. Bell (m. 1954; died 2005)
- Children: 3 (including Bradley and Lauralee)

Lee Phillip Bell (born Loreley June Phillip; June 10, 1928 – February 25, 2020) was an American talk show host and soap opera creator. During her career on Chicago television, she hosted over 10,000 programs and, early in her tenure, worked five shows a day, seven days a week. She went on to co-create two of American television's longest-running soap operas.

== Early life ==
Bell was born Loreley June Phillip in Chicago, Illinois, to florists James A. and Helen Phillip (née Novak). Her parents named her after a Japanese Anemone flower. She had an older brother, J.R., and a younger brother, Russell.

Bell graduated from what is now known as Riverside Brookfield High School in Riverside, Illinois. She then received a degree in microbiology from Northwestern University.

== Career ==
=== Television performer and host ===
After graduating from Northwestern, Bell returned to work in her family's floral shop with her brothers. On occasion, she accompanied her brother Russell to the local television station where he worked on a local talk show, demonstrating flower arrangement. Eventually, she took over this job from him, before quitting the floral shop altogether and pursuing other positions at the station. (In 1952 when Bell first started on television, the Chicago station was FCC licensed as WBKB-TV Channel 4. In 1953, the call letters and frequency of the station were changed to WBBM-TV Channel 2.) In December 1952, Bell began hosting a 15-minute show at 2:15 on weekday afternoons. She soon went to hosting a five-minute segment on “homemaker news” each weekday at 12:25 p.m. In 1953, Bell began hosting Meet Miss Lee, Mornin’ Miss Lee, Lee Phillip's Chicago, Shopping with Miss Lee and, later, The Lee Phillip Show, which became Noonbreak. In the early days of hosting Mornin’ Miss Lee, she also forecasted the weather, while wearing a hat that corresponded with her forecast. Bell would also read commercials on TV during football and basketball telecasts. By 1955, Bell was celebrating her 2,500th show on the station. Another special she hosted in 1975, Forgotten Children, was on child abuse. She also hosted other programs, including a Saturday morning children's program on WBBM-TV titled The Friendship Show from 1955 to 1965 and a WBBM Radio weekday afternoon show with Paul Gibson titled The Lady & The Tiger.

=== The Lee Phillip Show ===
For more than 30 years in Chicago, The Lee Phillip Show tackled rarely considered social problems. She investigated the lives of prisoners, the struggles of runaways and the dangers of breast cancer (one of the first televised self-exams was demonstrated on her show). The show quickly became a fixture in Chicago daytime television, drawing many celebrity guests. She interviewed Presidents Richard Nixon and Jimmy Carter (and his entire extended family) as well as actors John Wayne, Lucille Ball, and Judy Garland. The Lee Phillip Show was also shown in other cities in the early 1960s by CBS network affiliates and received 16 local Emmy Awards. On December 20, 1966, the show had a Christmas special that included The Nutcracker.

=== Television producer ===
During the early days of their marriage, William left advertising and began writing for soap operas like Guiding Light, As the World Turns and Another World with Irna Phillips. Lee Bell would learn about important issues via her television show, and pass them along to her husband, who in turn would weave them into his storylines.

After leaving her TV show, Bell joined her husband to co-create the popular CBS soap opera The Young and the Restless in 1973 and its sister show The Bold and the Beautiful in 1987. She also served as executive producer of The Bold and the Beautiful in the 1980s.

== Awards and honors ==
Bell won a Daytime Emmy Award for Outstanding Drama Series for The Young and the Restless in 1975. She received a lifetime achievement award from the Daytime Emmys in 2007. She received 16 regional (Chicago) Emmy awards and numerous Golden Mike awards throughout her career. She was also the recipient of the Alfred I. duPont–Columbia University Award for the May 1973 special The Rape of Paulette, the first program in Chicago to explore the issue, and in 1977 she was the first woman to receive the Governors award from the Chicago chapter of the National Academy of Television Arts and Sciences.

In 1980, she was named “Person of the Year” by the Broadcast Advertising Club of Chicago and the outstanding woman in communications by the Chicago YMCA. She also received the Salvation Army's William Booth Award for her distinguished career in communications and social service.

== Personal life and death ==
While working at the talk show, Lee Phillip met advertising agent William Joseph Bell, later marrying him in 1954. They relocated from the Chicago area to the Beverly Grove neighborhood of Beverly Hills, California in 1986. The marriage lasted until his death on April 29, 2005.

Bell was the mother of William James Bell, Bradley Phillip Bell, Lauralee Bell Martin, and the mother-in-law of Maria Arena Bell and Colleen Bradley Bell; all of the Bell family members are involved in some way with the production of the company's soap operas. She also had eight grandchildren.

On February 25, 2020, she died at age 91; the announcement was made by her children. Bell died of natural causes at her home, according to Eva Basler, a spokeswoman for the family and their company Bell-Phillip Television Productions.

She was buried next to him. (Westwood Village Memorial Park)
