= Let's Pretend with Uncle Russ =

American radio program (1948–1952)

Let's Pretend with Uncle Russ was a children's radio program presented by the Armed Forces Radio Service and was hosted by Russ Thompson. From 1948 to 1952, kids at American military bases all over the world would tune into Let's Pretend with Uncle Russ on Saturday mornings.

Russ was a staff sergeant and was stationed at AFRS Sendai, Japan, as program director in 1951 and 1952. He produced, wrote, directed and was "Uncle Russ", a 30-minute show sent to AFRS stations around the world. He told stories and played music in the show, and had the "Around the World Safety Club."

"Uncle Russ" received many fan letters from his young audience. You can view some of these letters and see photos from the show at his web site.
