= Blue Ribbon Town =

US radio program

Groucho Marx during his 1944 visit to the Pabst Brewing Company; the man at the left is Fred Pabst, Jr., chairman of Pabst Brewing.

Blue Ribbon Town was a comedy-variety radio series starring Groucho Marx, sponsored by Pabst Blue Ribbon Beer, and broadcast on CBS from March 27, 1943, to August 5, 1944. The 30-minute series was heard Saturday nights at 10:30 p.m. until October when it moved to 8 p.m. It was also known as Pabst Blue Ribbon Town.

The comedy situations, starring Marx, took place in the mythical American community of Blue Ribbon Town where men were men, women were women, and the jokes were mainly puns. Other regulars were Virginia O'Brien, Leo Gorcey and Fay McKenzie. The vocalists were Kenny Baker (who took over as host after Marx left in June 1944), Bill Days and Donald Dickson. Dick Joy was the announcer.

Small Business Times editor Steve Jagler wrote about the program's visit to Milwaukee February 5, 1944, to celebrate Pabst's 100th anniversary:

The dialogue of the old radio show is classic Groucho schtick: Co-star Fay McKenzie says to the host, "Oh, Groucho, look, there's Lake Michigan! My, it's choppy today. See all the whitecaps." In his trademark sarcastic tone, Groucho replies, "Yes, isn't it wonderful? You get near the place where they make Pabst beer, and even the lake has a head on it." The Milwaukee crowd erupts in laughter and applause. Announcer Durward Kirby then interrupts the skit to promote Pabst and its 100th anniversary, in a pitch that seems eerily ironic today, given the brewer's demise a half-century later.

The show was written, directed and produced by Dick Mack. Robert Armbruster supplied the music.

== Listen to ==
- Blue Ribbon Town broadcast from Milwaukee in celebration of Pabst's 100th anniversary (February 5, 1944)
