= Hollywood Hotel (radio program) =

American radio program during 1930s

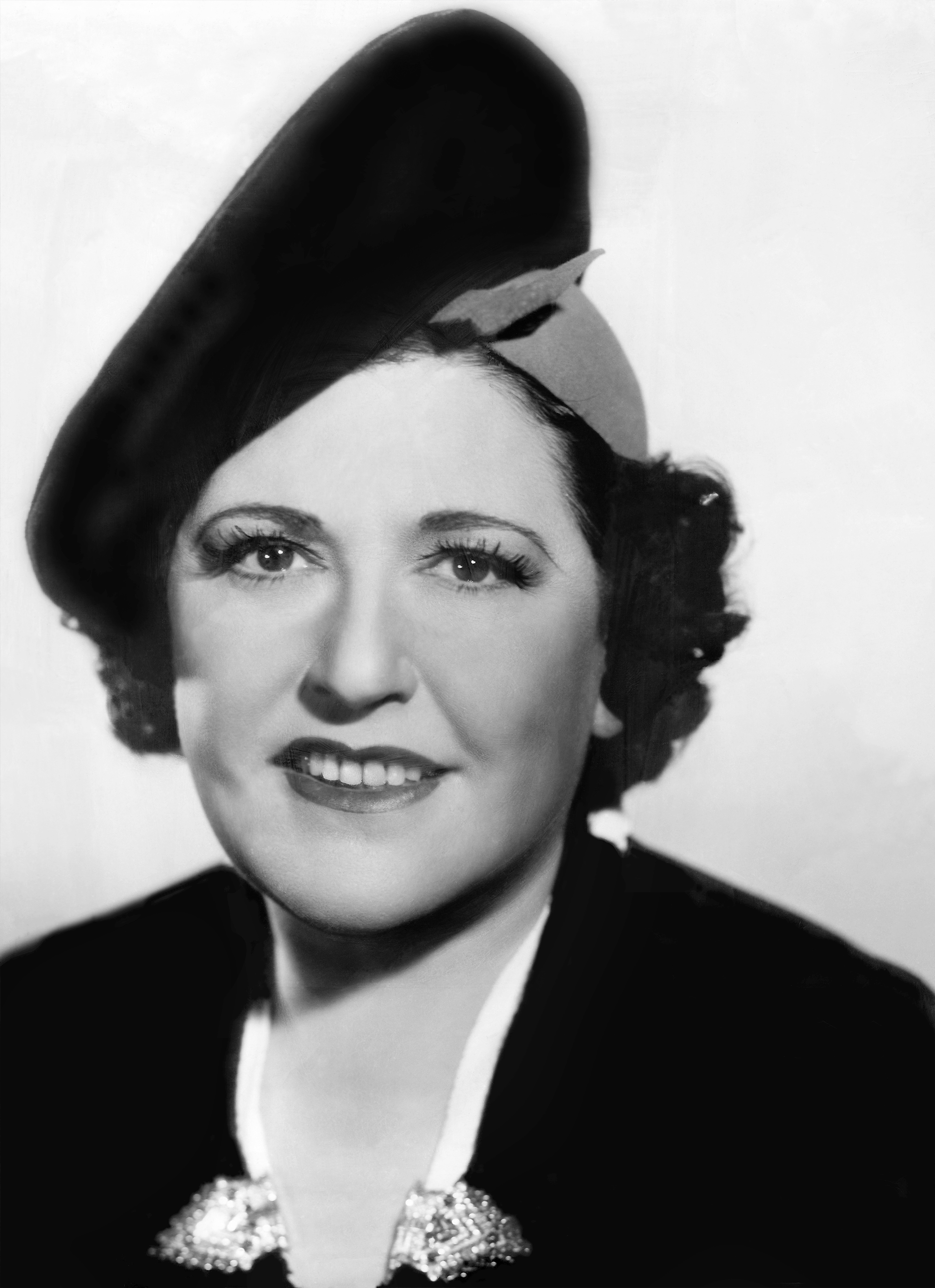
- Louella Parsons
- Genre: Drama/Variety
- Running time: 1 hour
- Country of origin: United States
- Language: English
- Syndicates: CBS
- Hosted by: Louella Parsons; William Powell
- Starring: Dick Powell; Fred MacMurray
- Announcer: Ken Niles
- Written by: Wyllis Cooper; John McClain
- Directed by: George MacGarrett; William A. Bacher; F.G. Ibbett; Brewster Morgan
- Original release: October 5, 1934 – December 2, 1938
- Opening theme: Blue Moon
- Sponsored by: Campbell's

Hollywood Hotel is an American radio program that was broadcast in the 1930s. It featured Hollywood stars in dramatized versions of then-current movies and "helped to make Hollywood an origination point for major radio programs." Radio historian John Dunning called the program, sponsored by Campbell's, "the most glamorous show of its time." The program was the inspiration for the 1937 Warner Brothers movie of the same title, which featured Louella Parsons as herself.

The instigator of the program was gossip columnist Louella Parsons, whose column was distributed by the Hearst Syndicate. Dunning wrote that she "promoted the concept and became the driving force behind the success of Hollywood Hotel."

At the time Hollywood Hotel was launched, Parsons had no peers in Hollywood. In 1937, columnist Jimmy Fidler wrote, "Louella Parsons has broadened her domination of filmland to include radio, and woe be to those who dare to flout her authority."

Hollywood Hotel's popularity even spread beyond the United States. On January 28, 1938, all stations of the Canadian Broadcasting Corporation began carrying it. It was also broadcast in Australia. A June 11, 1938, ad in a Sydney newspaper said, "In America, 'Hollywood Hotel' entertains millions of listeners, and now, from 2UE, it is winning a big audience who appreciate smart, snappy entertainment. Hear it every Thursday night at 8:15."

== Format ==
Dunning described the hour-long program as being "built around the illusion of a glamorous hotel." Although it was broadcast from a studio, an episode would begin with "a lot of talk and film babble as the stars supposedly made their way in and out of the theater." Next came a musical segment featuring an orchestral number, a solo by a member of the cast and a performance by a guest singer. Then Parsons interviewed a celebrity. A station break ensued, followed by a 20-minute sketch based on a new movie and featuring several of the movie's stars.

That abridged version of a movie apparently whetted listeners' appetites for the real thing. One writer reported, "Lolly [Parsons] could sometimes double a picture's earnings by admitting it to the program."

In a sense, Hollywood Hotel may have marked a transition in the relationship between the movie industry and radio. Edward D. Berkowitz wrote that, although the movie industry considered radio a threat in the latter's early years, "In time, however, Hollywood came to accept the permanent presence of radio and to use the new medium to its advantage." He went on to cite the role Parsons' program played:

The conceit behind the program was that it was taking place in a glamorous Hollywood hotel -- not a utilitarian radio studio, as it actually was. Stars dropped in for drinks or dinner and caught up with Louella Parsons, who interviewed them on their latest doings. Dick Powell sang a song, replicating the variety format popular on radio, and then the stars re-created scenes from their latest pictures. It was radio in the service of Hollywood in the service of radio, and everyone made out.

== Star Power ==
Much of Hollywood Hotel's attraction was the caliber of Hollywood stars that appeared on it. In the first five episodes alone, listeners heard Claudette Colbert, Ronald Colman, Loretta Young, Jean Harlow, Dolores del Río, Reginald Owen, Victor Jory and Gloria Swanson. A January 23, 1937, article in Motion Picture Daily reported that Hollywood Hotel had 83 "film guests" from July 1, 1936, to January 1, 1937.

Listeners might have been surprised to learn that those big-name Hollywood stars appeared for free—or, more precisely, that they received one case of the sponsor's soup for their appearances. Such was Parsons' power in Hollywood that, as an article in Life magazine summarized, she "could -- and did -- bully the biggest stars in the business into appearing without pay on her radio program." Another article in Life in 1965 summarized Parson's broadcasting success after an earlier failure:

When she flopped with a local radio program on which she interviewed "guest" stars, she simply essayed a grander scheme; instead of kidnaping screen personalities one by one, she corralled them by whole companies to do synopsized versions of current movies, and in so doing, she hit it rich.

Even Parsons' power, however, had its limits. Movie stars who normally received $1,000 for appearing on a radio program resented receiving only a case of soup. Life magazine reported, "when the Screen Actors' Guild, led by Jimmy Cagney, insisted they be paid with money instead, the sponsor recoiled in horror and the program was speedily abandoned."

== Cast ==
Initially, Parsons was the hostess and star. After the soup-for-performance system was abandoned, the program was brought back in 1938 with William Powell as host and star. Herbert Marshall filled in for Powell at times.

Other cast members were as follows:

- MC: Dick Powell, Fred MacMurray, Jerry Cooper, Ken Murray and Frank Parker
- Telephone operator (opening each show with "Hello, Hollywood Hotel"): Duane Thompson
- Vocalists: Rowene (Jane) Williams, Frances Langford, Anne Jamison, Lois Ravel, Shirley Ross, Loretta Lee
- Orchestra leaders: Raymond Paige; Ted Fio Rito
- Announcer: Ken Niles

A contemporary source also lists Igor Gorin as a singer on the program.

== Production ==
Directors for the program included Bill Bacher.

== Critical response ==
A review in the trade publication Radio Daily noted a drop in the program's quality after MacMurray replaced Powell, commenting that MacMurray might be "too exhausted from film work to be very scintillating in his air stint." The review complimented the performances of Langford and Gorin.

== See also ==
- Brownstone Theater
- Hollywood Star Time (interview program)
- Lux Radio Theatre
