= A. L. Alexander's Mediation Board =

1940s radio program

A.L. Alexander's Mediation Board is a 1940s radio program in which private citizens with personal problems received advice from a panel of educators and sociologists.

Launched in 1939, the series borrowed elements from host A.L. Alexander's earlier (1935–36) program of legal advice, Goodwill Court. Alexander was once described by Time as "earnest, voluble, begoggled Albert Louis Alexander, onetime divinity student, actor, social worker, legman, radio announcer."

In the early 1940s, Alexander's show was carried by Mutual in a 45-minute format, with a trio of experts dispensing advice on such topics as romance, marriage and financial woes. Sponsored by Serutan, the program was heard on Mondays at 9:15pm or 9:30pm until it moved to Sundays at 8pm or 8:15pm. In 1943, the show was shortened to 30 minutes, as noted by Time:

The particular appeal of Alexander's show lies in the fact that he gets both complainants—husband v. wife, etc.—together at the microphone and lets them battle it out. About 2,500 worried people write him every week. Others telephone. Some phone regularly. One of these is a woman who calls up just to tell him to be a good boy and eat his spinach.

Mediator Alexander last week found himself in need of mediation. His 45-minute program had been cut by Mutual to a half-hour, which makes a better "package" for would-be sponsors. This was just half the time allotted to his chief rival, the Good Will Hour's John J. Anthony, who omnisciently resolves all problems with no help from a jury. Struggling to figure how to pack enough material into his shortened broadcast, Alexander observed: "This change presents a big problem to me." "Well," advised a studioman, "why don't you call John J. Anthony?"

Alexander's series had a long run but was eventually reduced to 15 minutes before Mutual brought it to an end on April 11, 1952.

In 1959, Alexander briefly revived the concept on television as The Court of Human Relations, which aired from June 22 to August 14.
