= Calling All Cars (radio program) =

Old-time American radio police drama

- Genre: Police drama
- Running time: 30 minutes
- Country of origin: United States
- Language: English
- Syndicates: CBS West Coast; Mutual-Don Lee
- Hosted by: Chief James E. Davis, Los Angeles Police Department
- Written by: William N. Robson; Mel Williamson; Sam Pierce
- Directed by: Robert Hixon
- Produced by: William N. Robson
- Original release: November 29, 1933 – September 8, 1939

Calling All Cars is an old-time radio police drama in the United States. It was broadcast on the CBS West Coast network and on the Mutual-Don Lee Network November 29, 1933 – September 8, 1939 and carried by transcription on stations in other areas. The program was notable for being one of the first police dramas on radio.

== Format ==
Calling All Cars dramatized cases that had been handled by the Los Angeles Police Department. A typical episode began by relating the facts of a particular crime, then introducing individuals who were associated with the case. A dramatization followed, climaxing in the arrest of the criminal. The outcome of a trial wrapped up the story. In On the Air: The Encyclopedia of Old-Time Radio, radio historian John Dunning described the program as "a crude forerunner of a type that reached its zenith years later on Dragnet: the tedious routine of tracking killers and robbers, often with a postshow recap telling how justice was meted out."

== Personnel ==
Chief James E. Davis of the Los Angeles Police Department was the host of Calling All Cars, and Charles Frederick Lindsey, professor of speech education at Occidental College, was the narrator. Other on-air people were generally uncredited. William N. Robson wrote and produced the program, with Mel Williamson and Sam Pierce also writing for it. Robert Hixon was the director.

== Sponsors ==
=== Networks ===
Calling All Cars was sponsored by Rio Grande Oil Co., which had dealers in California, Arizona, and Nevada, with commercials promoting its petroleum products and other products and services for vehicles. The company augmented the radio broadcasts with the monthly publication Calling All Cars News, which was available free from service stations that sold Rio Grande products. Issues often contained stories that were related to upcoming episodes of the program. By November 1936, the publication's circulation had reached 400,000. Rio Grande also created an organization for young listeners. After filling out a form obtained from a dealer and sending it in, a youngster received a metal badge with "Junior Police Safety Department" on the front.

=== Syndication ===
As time went on, other sponsors used transcriptions of Calling All Cars, spreading it beyond its original western and southwestern coverage. In January 1939, Axton-Fisher Tobacco Co. began sponsoring the program on stations in Detroit, Michigan, and St. Louis, Missouri, advertising Twenty Grand cigarettes. In March 1939, Gruen Watch Co. began sponsoring it on a station in Syracuse, New York. In May 1939, Liebmann Breweries began sponsoring it on eight stations in the eastern United States, advertising Rheingold Beer. In February 1940, Ford dealers in the midwestern United States began sponsoring the series on eight midwestern stations; the dealers had already been sponsoring it on a station in Des Moines, Iowa.

== Recognition ==
On December 21, 1938, Calling All Cars received the Institute of Audible Arts Trophy for "the most consistently excellent program broadcast in western United States during 1938".

== See also ==
- List of police radio dramas
