= Court of Opinions =

- Genre: Panel discussion
- Presented by: Neil Leroy
- Country of origin: Canada
- Original language: English
- No. of seasons: 1

Production
- Producer: Drew Crossan
- Running time: 30 minutes

Original release
- Network: CBC Television
- Release: 10 September – 26 November 1952

Court of Opinions is one of the first Canadian panel discussion television series, airing on CBC Television in 1952.

== Premise ==
Neil Leroy moderated the panel which consisted of Lister Sinclair, Kate Aitken and two guests. Court of Opinions was adapted from a CBC Radio series.

== Scheduling ==
This half-hour series was broadcast on most Wednesday nights from 10 September to 26 November 1952, normally at 9:30 p.m. (Eastern).
