= Meet the Meeks =

American radio comedy program

Meet the Meeks was an American radio comedy program broadcast on NBC from 1947 to 1949. The Chicago-based series starred Forrest Lewis as Mortimer Meek, Fran Allison as his wife, Agatha, and Beryl Vaughan as their daughter, Peggy.

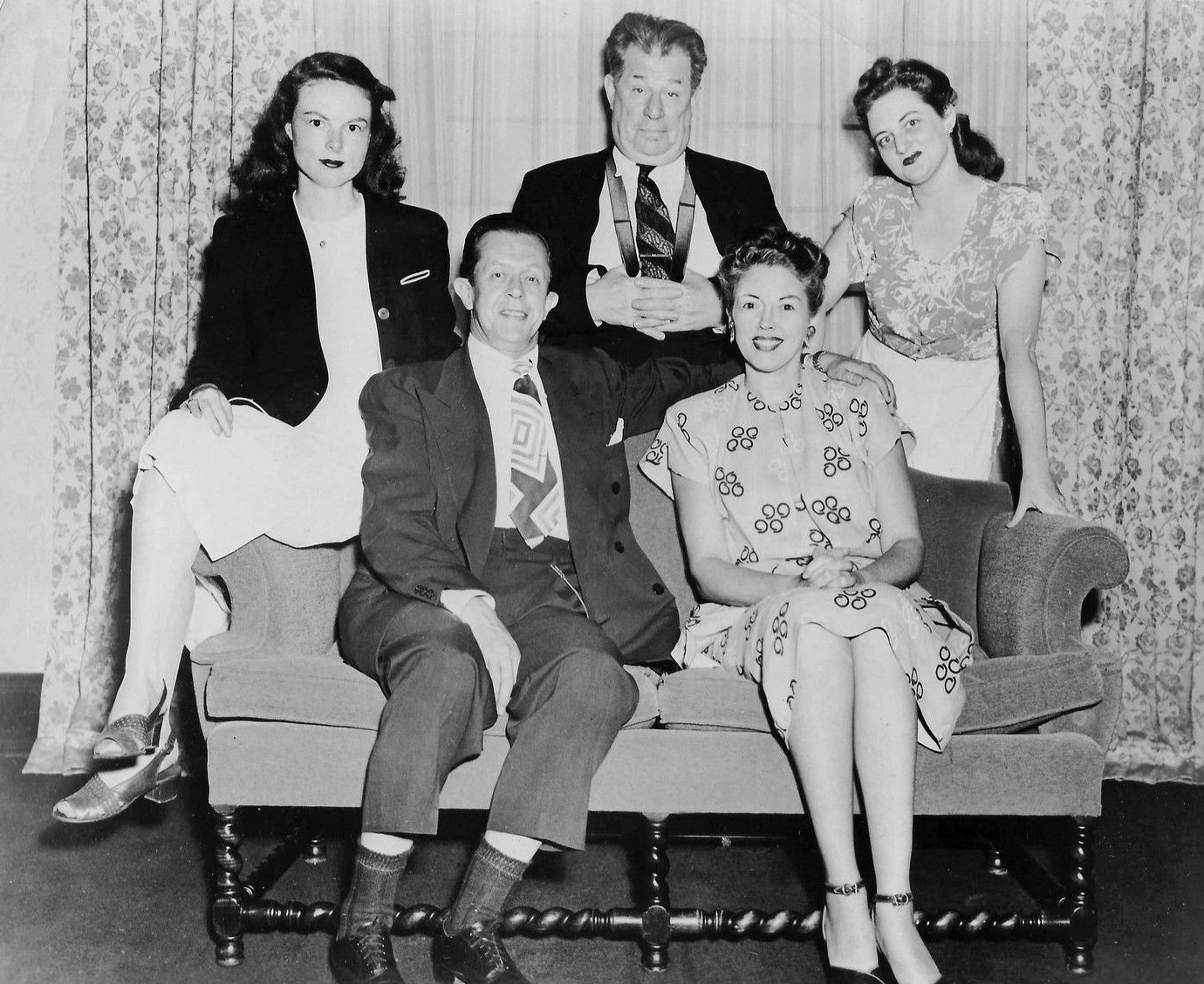
Cast photo from Meet the Meeks in 1947. Seated from left: Beryl Vaughan, Forrest Lewis, and Fran Allison; standing: Cliff Soubier and Elmira Roessler.

== Broadcast history ==
Meet the Meeks debuted on NBC on August 23, 1947, before obtaining sponsorship that November. Les Weinrott sold the program through J. Walter Thompson and remained involved in its production during the intervening weeks.

Swift & Company sponsored the program to advertise its Allsweet margarine. The family comedy-drama aired Saturdays at 10:00 a.m. CST from Chicago and was carried by 161 NBC stations. Weinrott served as writer and director under Swift's initial 52-week contract.

Swift renewed its sponsorship for a second year beginning November 6, 1948, when the series was airing across the full NBC network. Harrison B. Summers's history of national radio-network programming lists Meet the Meeks for both the 1947–48 and 1948–49 seasons as a Swift-sponsored daytime comedy-drama.

== Reception ==
The series had previously aired under the title Meet Mr. Meek. Reviewing the renamed version in August 1947, Variety found the situation comedy derivative, its characters stereotyped and the ending predictable. The episode also finished early enough to require an extended organ fill after the cast credits.

Radio Life reviewed Meet the Meeks alongside Archie Andrews in January 1948. It faulted both Saturday-morning comedies for following the same "deplorable pattern" of family life, but found "several redeeming features" in Meet the Meeks. The performances of Lewis, Allison and Vaughan brought "whimsicality and sympathy" to Mortimer, Agatha and Peggy, while Weinrott's writing sometimes achieved a "gentle sincerity".

The same review objected to Uncle Louie, played by Cliff Soubier, being used as a blundering comic stooge. It considered the central family strong enough without him and argued that his presence pushed the Meeks toward slapstick.

== Cast ==
The principal cast included:

- Forrest Lewis as Mortimer Meek
- Fran Allison as Agatha Meek
- Beryl Vaughan as Peggy Meek
- Cliff Soubier as Louie Leach
- Elmira Roessler as Lily

A December 1948 profile of Vaughan described Peggy as the family's mischievous high-school daughter.
