= Mark Warnow =

American bandleader (1900–1949)

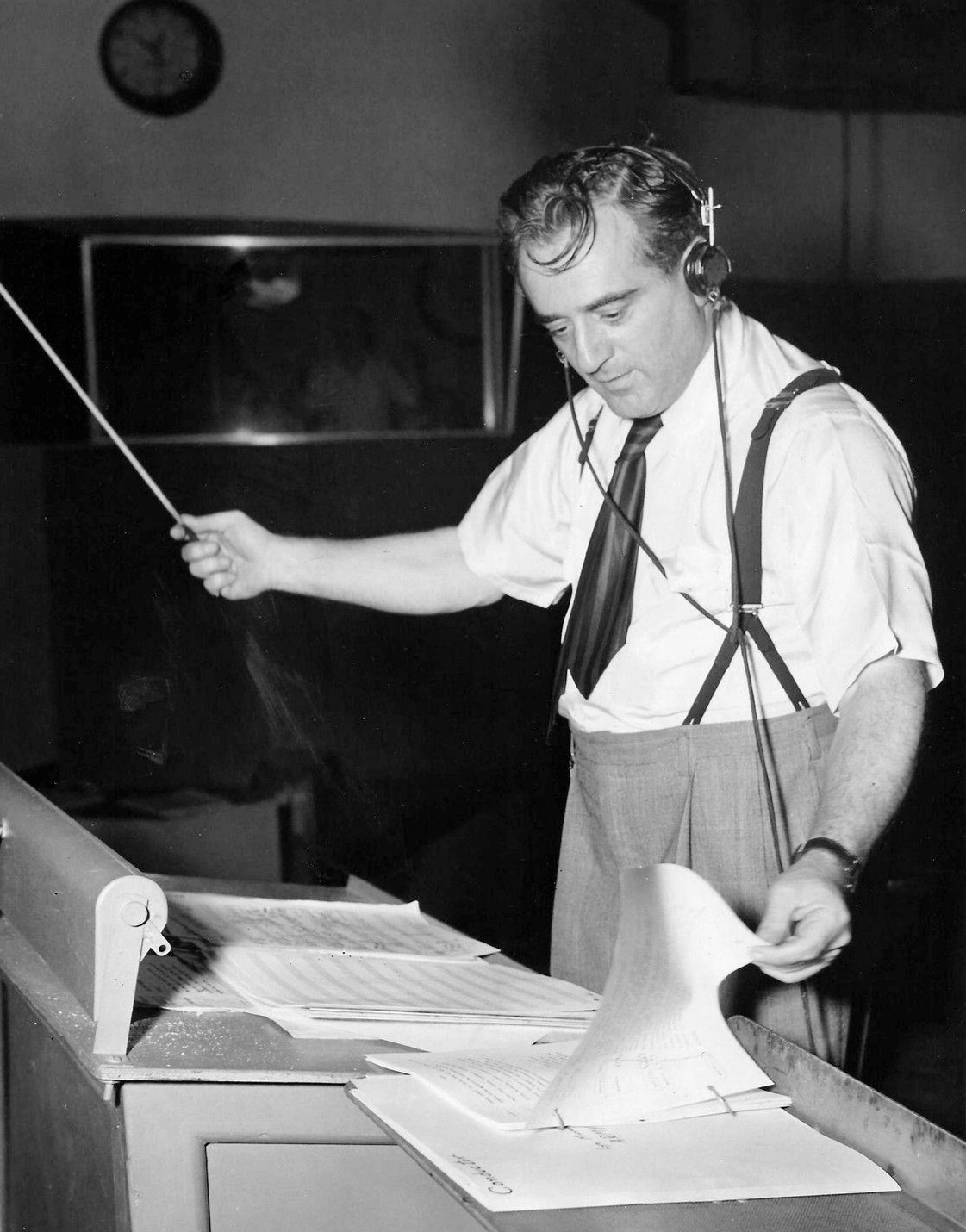
- Warnow in 1946

Background information
- Born: April 10, 1900; Monastyrishche, Kiev Governorate, Russian Empire
- Died: October 17, 1949 (aged 49); New York City, U.S.
- Occupations: Musician; conductor
- Instrument: Violin
- Years active: 1910s–1940s
- Relatives: Raymond Scott (brother)

Mark Warnow (April 10, 1900 – October 17, 1949) was an American violinist and orchestra conductor, who performed on the radio in the 1930s and 1940s. He was the older brother of composer and bandleader Raymond Scott, born Harry Warnow, and is credited with steering his younger brother into a career in music.

== Early years ==
Warnow was born in Monastyrishche, Kiev Governorate, Russian Empire to Jewish parents; he immigrated with them to the United States in 1907. (according to other sources, age 5). Warnow grew up in Brooklyn, New York. He attended Public School 100 and Eastern District High School, where he was a soloist as a violinist in the school's orchestra.

== Career ==
When he was 17, Warnow became the Massel Opera's musical director. From that, he became the Ziegfeld Follies' musical director. That was followed by a stint as bandleader for the Music Box Revue.

== Radio ==
Warnow enjoyed a lengthy and versatile career with the CBS Radio network. He was CBS music director in the early 1930s, and hired his younger brother Harry as a keyboardist in 1931.

On July 2, 1935, a CBS program debuted with singer Virginia Verrill starring and Warnow's orchestra accompanying her.

Warnow conducted the orchestra on the CBS radio program Your Hit Parade from 1939 to his death in 1949. A 1941 newspaper article described Warnow as "the busiest man in radio", noting that his conducting duties included not only Your Hit Parade, but Helen Hayes Theatre and We, the People.

He also conducted his orchestras for The Jack Berch Show, the "Matinee Theatre" program, and Ed Wynn's Happy Island program.

Mark Warnow also conducted the orchestra for the "Sound Off" Radio show, 1946, New York City, sponsored by the U.S. Army to encourage post World War II recruitment. Emcee Arno Tanney, aka "The Chant" would sing/chant army recruiting commercials like a drill seargeant in his signature booming baritone to the rapid fire rhythm of the "Duckworth Chant" - "Join the Army, it's for you, better pay and college too, Sound Off!, 1, 2, Sound Off! 3, 4, - 1, 2, 3, 4, Sound Off...Sound Off!"

== Stage ==
Warnow also produced a Broadway musical-comedy, What's Up? (1943-1944).

== Film ==
Warnow appeared as himself with his band in the Paramount Pictures release Paramount Headliner: The Star Reporter (1938).

== Recordings ==
In the 1940s, Warnow conducted and arranged for Frank Sinatra while the singer was signed to Columbia Records, then owned by the CBS network. He was also a composer and recording artist.

In 1949, Warnow and his orchestra recorded a Capitol Records album, Sound Off, named for the Sound Off Chant, which was featured on the album along with some marches and other patriotic music.

== Personal life ==
Warnow's first wife was Sylvia Rapaport, with whom he had three children. She died in 1939. His second wife was Helen McGowan and had two children with her. They divorced in August 1948.

== Death ==
Warnow died October 1, 1949, of a heart attack in Polyclinic Hospital in New York City, aged 49.
