= Happy Island =

American radio variety series (1944–1945)

Happy Island is an American radio variety program that starred Ed Wynn and was broadcast on the Blue Network from September 8,1944, to February 26, 1945. Beginning January 15, 1945, it was renamed Ed Wynn Show, and the format was changed.

== Background ==
Wynn's radio career appeared to have been finished in the 1930s with the ending of his program The Fire Chief, followed by three shows that "were marked by brief runs and diminishing ratings". He dealt with a divorce, business losses, and severe depression. Happy Island brought him back to radio in 1944.

== Overview ==
Wynn originated the concept of Happy Island, which was a fantasy place in addition to being the show's name. The island combined "the best features of previously imagined never-never lands, such as the Disney creations, the tales of Grimm, Shangri-la, and all the other lands of heart's desire whose names are legion". Wynn portrayed King Bubbles, who ruled the island. Not far away lay the Isle of Caster, a dour place ruled by King Nasty, who "hates all that is happiness and sunshine". The relationship between the two places became complicated after King Nasty's son (Prince Richard) fell in love with King Bubbles's ward, Princess Elaine. Blotto was the king's advisor. In addition to its human characters, the show featured three bovines: Elsie, Elmer, and their daughter Beulah. Mark Warnow provided music.

=== Change to Ed Wynn Show ===
Beginning with the January 15, 1945, episode, the program had a new title accompanied by changes in the format and cast. The island format was dropped, the program was renamed the Ed Wynn Show, and instead of portraying a king, Wynn played "a plain but comical citizen who becomes involved each week in ridiculous situations". In addition to Wynn, Warnow was retained as orchestra leader, and Jerry Wayne continued on the show as singer. Minerva Pious, who had appeared on some episodes of Happy Island, was added to the cast. The actors who portrayed the bovine characters continued in those roles.

== Cast ==
Cast of Happy Island
Character	Actor
King Bubbles	Ed Wynn
King Nasty	Winfield Hoeny
Princess Elaine	Evelyn Knight
Prince Richard	Jerry Wayne
Blotto	Rolfe Sedan
Elsie	Hope Emerson
Elmer	Craig McDonnell
Beulah	Lorna Lynn

== Production ==
Wynn owned the program and controlled its content. George McGarritt and Ray Knight were the producers; Hal Block and Knight were writers. The show was produced with island-related visual effects of which radio listeners were unaware. Radio historian John Dunning described it as "a fully decorated show, with flashy sets and lighting effects and the entire cast in full dress". That approach, which differed from most radio programs, followed Wynn's precedent on The Fire Chief, where he wore funny outfits. He said that such costumes made him feel funny, and he hoped that feeling would make him sound funny. Borden's milk sponsored the 30-minute show, which was initially broadcast on Fridays at 7 p.m. Eastern Time. Effective January 15, 1945, it was moved to Mondays at 9 p.m. E. T.

Happy Island debuted with low Hooper ratings and failed to improve. By November 1944, the sizes of both the cast and the writing staff had been reduced. A report in the trade publication Billboard described "the general strengthening and streamlining" that was being done to the show and reported, "It is said that the sponsor, Borden, once willing to sink any amount of money to build a top airer, is becoming leery of unproductive spending."

== Critical response ==
Jeanne Yount wrote in The Oregon Journal that Happy Island "isn't even mildly amusing". She contrasted the popularity of The Fire Chief with the lack of appeal of the current program, noting the latter's "abundance of puns and rehashes of old and feeble jokes". Yount complimented the musical performances of Knight, Wayne, and Warnow but said that the show devoted too much time to the three bovines, so that "The entire show appears to be one continuous commercial."

In a review in The New York Times, Jack Gould wrote that Wynn "was in fine fettle" in the premiere episode and noted, "Seven years away from the air, fortunately, have not changed Ed." Gould complimented the singing of Knight and Wayne in both solos and duets and described the orchestral accompaniment directed by Warnow as "relaxed and finished".

A review in the trade publication Billboard said that Happy Island failed by having humor that was too broad for children and not broad enough for adults. The review said that the show's concept "is best described as an Alice in Wonderland nightmare. There are all the fundamentals of situation comedy without the comedy." It suggested that the primary purpose of the show's structure seemed to be to showcase the bovines that represented the sponsor, leaving the other performers hampered by the format.
