= Victory Theater (radio series) =

1942 radio series

- Genre: Radio programs
- Running time: 1 hour or 30 minutes
- Country of origin: United States
- Home station: CBS Radio
- Hosted by: Cecil B. DeMille
- Original release: July 20 – August 31, 1942
- No. of series: 1
- No. of episodes: 7
- Audio format: mono

Victory Theater is a CBS Radio network series that aired during the summer of 1942. The series was created in collaboration with the U.S. government's Office of Facts and Figures, which was then in the process of being consolidated under the Office of War Information. During the summer a similar series, titled Victory Parade, was also created for NBC Radio. Both of these series were produced as part of the World War II war effort and were designed to unite American citizens in their support for the war and to persuade the public to buy war bonds.

Each week Victory Theater presented a special episode of one of CBS's popular nighttime programs. The actors and crew volunteered their services for free, and the programs ran under government sponsorship, instead of under the usual commercial sponsorship. For their efforts, artists on both shows received a silver "V-for-Victory" pin. Victory Theater aired in the Lux Radio Theatre's traditional timeslot (initially as a one-hour program, subsequently as a half-hour program followed by an unrelated music program). Lux's Cecil B. DeMille was the host of Victory Theater, speaking for the sponsoring United States government.

While eight episodes were initially planned, only seven were ultimately produced. The eighth program, originally intended for September 7th, was to have featured comedian Fred Allen.

== List of episodes ==
Broadcast date	Participating program	Length	Citations and notes
1942-07-20	Lux Radio Theatre	60 minutes	One-hour adaptation of the film The Philadelphia Story, featuring the original stars Katharine Hepburn, James Stewart and Cary Grant
1942-07-27	Your Hit Parade	30 minutes	Featuring Joan Edwards, Barry Wood, Martin Block, and Mark Warnow’s Orchestra
1942-08-03	Major Bowes' Amateurs	30 minutes	Christina Carroll, coloratura soprano singer, joined by amateur sailors and soldiers
1942-08-10	The First Nighter Program	30 minutes	“Nest of Eagles”, starring Les Tremayne and Barbara Luddy
1942-08-17	Big Town	30 minutes	“What America Means to You”, starring Edward G. Robinson
1942-08-24	Amos 'n' Andy	30 minutes	"Love Comes to Andy Brown" starring Charles Correll and Freeman Gosden, with guests Victor Moore and Edward Arnold Note: This was the first time the program was presented in an expanded half-hour form. Initial plans for this date were for a presentation by musician and humorist Bob Burns
1942-08-31	The Screen Guild Theater	30 minutes	Thirty-minute adaptation of the film Joe Smith, American, featuring original star Robert Young, with Ruth Hussey

Instead of the previously planned September 7th episode featuring comedian Fred Allen, CBS ran the final episode of Norman Corwin's summer series An American in England, moving it up one hour to fill the Victory Theater's timeslot. Some contemporary newspaper listings and other sources, however, incorrectly show Victory Theater as still airing an eighth episode on this date. Ironically, Corwin's shortwave broadcast ended up being badly compromised by atmospherics.
