= Goodwill Court =

American radio human-interest series (1935–1936)

- Genre: Talk radio
- Running time: 1 hour (8:00 pm – 9:00 pm)
- Country of origin: United States
- Language: English
- Home station: NBC(1936); WMCA (1935-1936)
- Hosted by: A.L. Alexander
- Recording studio: New York, USAe
- Original release: March 31, 1935 – December 20, 1936
- Sponsored by: Chase & Sanborn Coffee

Goodwill Court was a popular human interest radio court show of the mid-1930s that broadcast for over a year, sponsored by Chase & Sanborn Coffee. In 1936, it was ranked among the top ten radio programs, but it was cancelled in response to complaints from the American Bar Association and a decision by the New York City Supreme Court.

== Overview ==
Defendants in real court cases told their stories and host A.L. Alexander stepped in to offer legal advice. The series premiered March 31, 1935, on WMCA in New York. The show moved to NBC September 20, 1936, airing as an hour-long show on Sundays at 8pm. As many as 15 cases would be heard during a single program.

Seven New York City-based legal associations registered a complaint against the program, and the American Bar Association's committee on unauthorized practice of law "unqualifiedly disapproved and condemned" the show "as being contrary to public interest."

After the New York State Lawyers Association objected, the New York City Supreme Court ruled that lawyers could not give counsel on radio programs. This brought an end to the series, which aired its final episode on December 20, 1936.

Alexander had more success and a longer run when he returned to the air with the 1939-1952 A.L. Alexander's Mediation Board, another series dispensing advice to people with problems but minus the legal aspect. Alexander was once described by Time as "earnest, voluble, begoggled Albert Louis Alexander, onetime divinity student, actor, social worker, legman, radio announcer."

In 1959, Alexander briefly revived the concept on television as The Court of Human Relations, which aired from June 22 to August 14.
