= The Frank Sinatra Show (radio program) =

US radio program

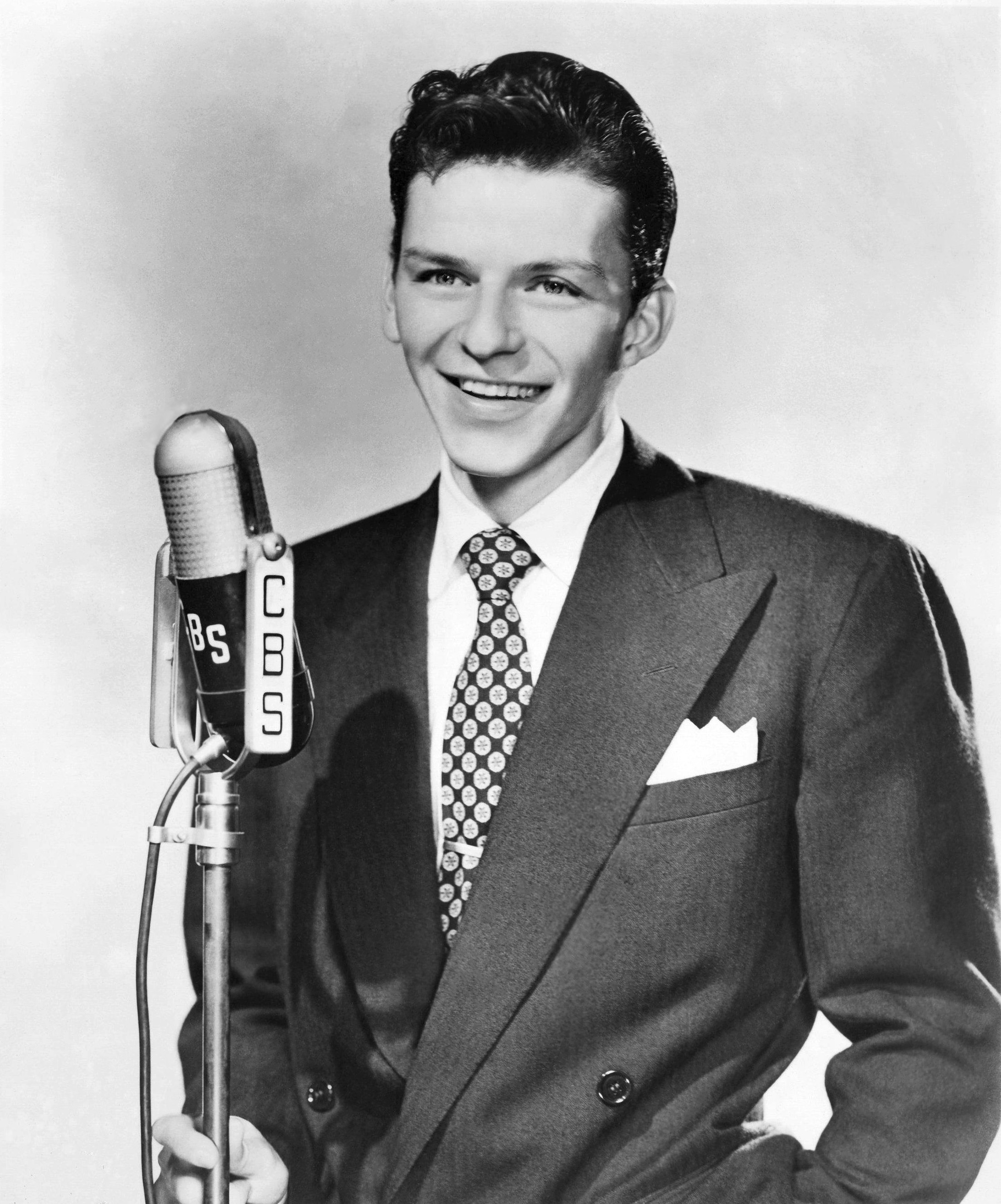
- Sinatra in a 1942 publicity photo for CBS Radio
- Other names: Broadway Bandbox; Frank Sinatra in Person; Here's Frank Sinatra; Light-Up Time; Meet Frank Sinatra; Perfectly Frank; Reflections; Songs by Sinatra; The Old Gold Show
- Genre: Music
- Country of origin: United States
- Language: English
- Syndicates: CBS; NBC
- Starring: Frank Sinatra
- Announcer: Truman Bradley; Marvin Miller; Robert J. Stevenson; Harlow Wilcox; William Lazar
- Written by: Carroll Carroll; Jerry Gollard; Virginia Ratcliff; Bill Telack; Hendrik Vollaerts; Frank Wilson
- Directed by: Bob Brewster; Mann Holiner
- Produced by: Robert Brewster; Earl Ebi
- Opening theme: Night and Day
- Ending theme: Put Your Dreams Away (For Another Day)

The Frank Sinatra Show was a title applied—in some cases specifically and in other cases generically—to several radio musical programs in the United States, some of which had other distinct titles as indicated below. Singer Frank Sinatra starred in the programs, some of which were broadcast on CBS, while others were on NBC.

== Format ==
Regardless of title or sponsor, the common thread running through all of the programs was that they featured music, primarily by Sinatra himself.

== Reflections (1942) ==
Shortly after Sinatra left Tommy Dorsey's orchestra in 1942, an executive at Columbia Records arranged for him to appear on Reflections, a sustaining (unsponsored) program on CBS. Author Will Friedwald wrote, "Sinatra appears to have done the program from October 1 to December 31, 1942." The 30-minute program included the orchestra of Walter Gross and the Bobby Tucker's Voices vocal group.

== Songs by Sinatra (Frank Sinatra Sings) (1942–43) ==
The first radio program that included Sinatra's name in its title, this version of Songs by Sinatra began October 20, 1942, and ended February 25, 1943. It was 15 minutes long and ran on Tuesday nights on CBS. The show's format was compared to that of Kraft Music Hall in that "it featured Sinatra, along with celebrity guests, in a mix of music and patter."

The overlap in schedules with Reflections meant that Sinatra was on radio two nights a week for a little more than two months. Friedwald, however, commented, "While this may seem like a lot of radio activity for a relatively unknown singer, it's doubtful that anyone was listening in 1942." Sinatra's daughter, Nancy, mentions both programs in her biography of her father, but she refers to the longer-running program as Frank Sinatra Sings.

== Broadway Bandbox (1943) ==
Previously scheduled from 11:30 to midnight (Eastern Time) on Fridays, Broadway Bandbox replaced the second half-hour of Lux Radio Theatre on CBS July 19, 1943 - September 13, 1943. Sinatra was the star, and Raymond Scott's orchestra provided instrumental backing. Singer Joan Roberts would "appear as [the program's] guest star occasionally." Robert J. Stevenson was the announcer until he joined the United States Army June 22, 1943. Sinatra was described as "a genial, half-shy, completely solid gent" as master of ceremonies in addition to his abilities as a singer.

While starring on Broadway Bandbox, Sinatra continued as one of the singers on Your Hit Parade, performing on the latter on Saturdays and the former on Mondays.

Broadway Bandbox was carried over to the Fall 1943 schedule on CBS. The Columbia Program Book for that season listed the show as scheduled 8-8:30 p.m. (Eastern Time) on Sundays. It described the show as a "melody-packed program," Sinatra as "most popular baritone of the day," and Scott as "master of jive." When its fall run began October 10, 1943, comedian Bert Wheeler was added to the cast and Axel Stordahl led the orchestra.

The summer segment's studio audience contained "teen age misses ... confronting studio ushers and others with a problem of super-exuberance." One newspaper article observed, "In the studio they cheer, they scream, they applaud, or they sigh audibly every time Sinatra is at the microphone." Perhaps as a result of that exuberance, in October 1943, the show became closed, with no studio audience. A newspaper announcement said, "This should give Sinatra opportunity to concentrate fully on the microphone without unasked-for assistance from teenage enthusiasts." Simultaneously, the starting time was shifted from 8 p.m. to 7 p.m. (Eastern Time), and the length was cut from 30 minutes to 15 minutes.

== The Frank Sinatra Show (Frank Sinatra In Person) (1944–45) ==
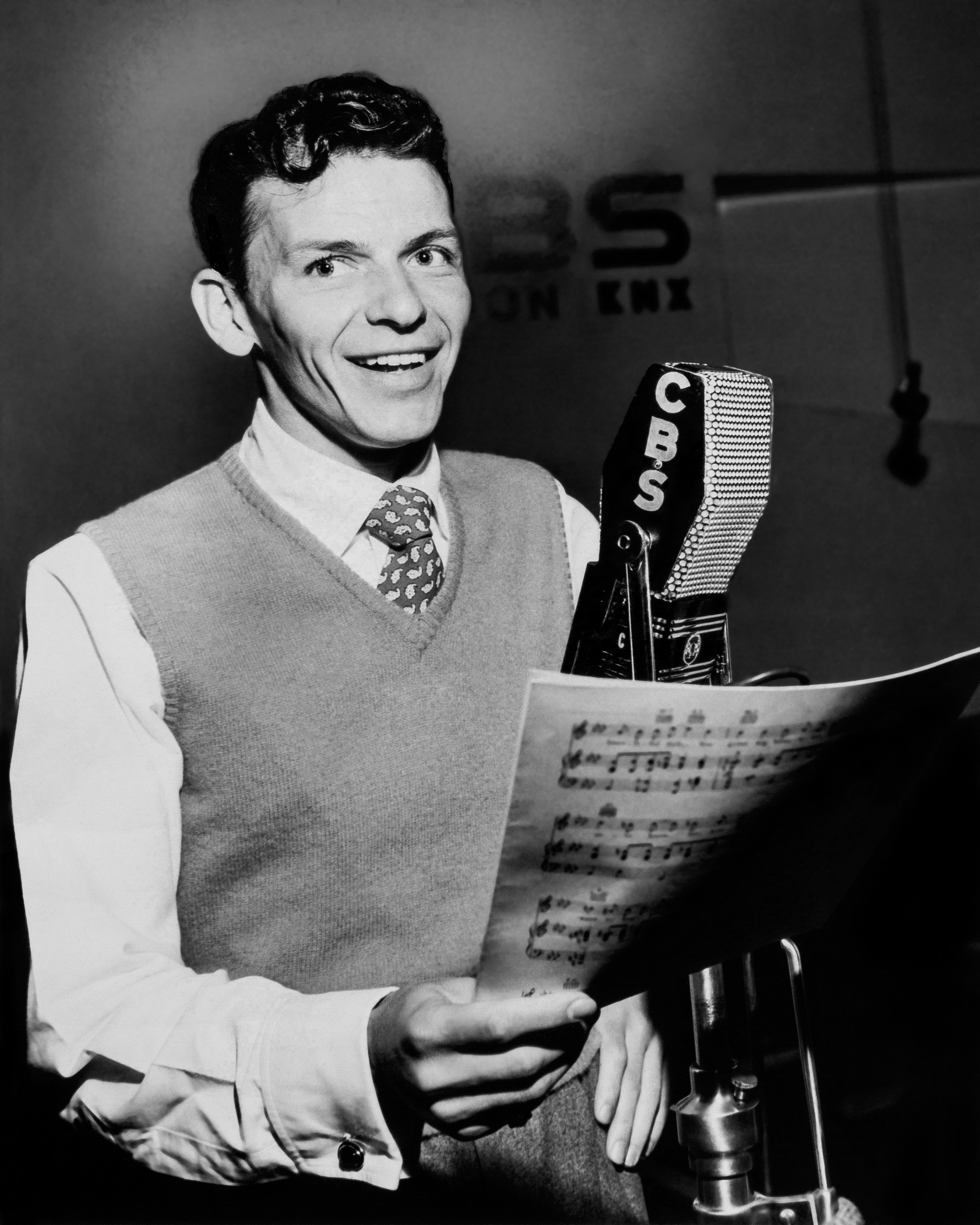
Sinatra in a CBS recording studio, 1944

Plans for another program (this one sponsored) "if Sinatra is not accepted by the Army" were under way in late 1943. He was later classified 4-F, and The Frank Sinatra Show debuted January 5, 1944, on CBS, with Ginger Rogers as its first guest star. Sponsored by Lever Brothers' Vimms vitamins, the program replaced that sponsor's Mayor of the Town. Comedian Bert Wheeler was a regular member of the cast, while Axel Stordahl and his orchestra and the Vimms Vocalists provided additional music. Harlow Wilcox was the announcer.

The program was discontinued June 14 but resumed August 16. Vocalist Eileen Barton became a regular beginning with that episode. The episodes from August 16 through December 25 were also referred to as Frank Sinatra In Person. Effective November 29, the program was moved from the 9-9:30 p.m. Wednesday slot to Mondays from 8:30 to 8:55 p.m. Lever Brothers dropped its sponsorship effective December 26, 1944. At the time, Sinatra's program had a Hooper rating of 11.5. News reports indicated that Lever was dropping all advertising for Vimms. Max Factor took over sponsorship effective with the January 3, 1945, broadcast. Seven months later, an ad in a trade publication touted, "Frank is also [the] No. 1 wholesaler of Max Factor's romantic products ..."

Earl Ebi was the initial producer; he was succeeded by Robert Brewster. Beginning with the August 16 episode, Hendrick Vollaerts became chief writer for the program. Other writers were Bill Telack, Jerry Gollard, and Virginia Ratcliff.

== Songs by Sinatra (1945–1947) ==
Sinatra went back on the air on CBS September 12, 1945, at 9 p.m. Eastern Time. The 30-minute program had what a trade publication called "a flexible production format which will be changed each week as events, material or talent demand." The cast included Bill Goodwin as "featured comedian." Sponsored by Old Gold cigarettes, the program also featured The Pied Pipers, Axel Stordahl and his orchestra, and, in the latter part of its run, Jane Powell. Marvin Miller was the announcer "and sometimes took part in skits." Guests such as Margaret Whiting, Tommy Dorsey, and Andre Previn were featured each week. Mann Holiner was the director and producer, succeeded in December 1946 by Ted Sherdeman.

The theme song was Night and Day, which Sinatra had sung in the 1943 movie Reveille with Beverly. The program apparently was especially popular with women. The Hooper ratings survey of radio programs' audiences (released September 30, 1946) showed that Songs by Sinatra "had the largest number of women listeners per listening set ... with 1.43."

As was true of most programs of that era, Songs by Sinatra was not broadcast in the summer. Its replacement (beginning June 12, 1946) was The Sad Sack, an adaptation of a popular wartime comic strip, which ran June 12, 1946- September 4, 1946.

On April 23, 1947, P. Lorillard & Co., manufacturer of Old Gold cigarettes, announced that it would not renew its option on the program, concluding the program's run as it ended its second year.

=== Critical response ===
A review in the trade publication Sponsor said that, based on the third episode as a sample, "Old Gold has hit the jackpot." It added that the show went so smoothly that the half-hour span seemed like 10 minutes. Two flaws were mentioned, one regarding the introduction to a song by the Pied Pipers and the other relating to orchestral interludes.

== Light-Up Time (1949–50) ==
Media critic John Crosby called the teaming of Sinatra and opera singer Dorothy Kirsten "what seems at first, or even second, blush to be the most unlikely combinations of singers on the air." The two singers co-starred in Sinatra's Light-Up Time, the title of which came from an advertising slogan for sponsor Lucky Strike cigarettes. The slogan: "Light up a Lucky -- it's light-up time." Jeff Alexander led the orchestra, and Don Wilson was the announcer. The program debuted September 5, 1949 and ended June 2, 1950. In March 1950, film commitments prevented Alexander from continuing on the program, and Skitch Henderson became the program's orchestra leader.

Overall, Crosby called the show "a very brief, very pleasant 15 minutes around cocktail time with old and new numbers about evenly mixed. Mr. Sinatra usually sings two numbers, Miss Kirsten one, and then they team up in a duet."

== Meet Frank Sinatra (Here's Frank Sinatra) (1950–51) ==
In the summer of 1949, Sinatra talked with representatives of the Mutual Broadcasting System about starring in a celebrity disc jockey program on that network, but it never materialized. CBS, however, arranged for the singer to do Meet Frank Sinatra.

The format of this program was "a session of songs, interviews and guests." Decades later, one author wrote: "Heard today, the show seems like an unwieldy combination of Songs by Sinatra and Oprah. In addition to singing with a rhythm section, Sinatra gave members of his studio audience the mike and exchanged snappy You Bet Your Life-style dialogue with them as well as with occasional guests. ... The show made so little impact that even hardcore Sinatra aficionados have barely heard of it."

In addition to Sinatra, personnel included announcer Hal Simms, writer Paul Dudley, and producer Gordon Auchincloss.

The show ran Sundays 5-6 p.m.(Eastern time) on CBS October 29, 1950 - May 27, 1951, followed by a shorter run 4:30-5:30 p.m. (Eastern time) June 3, 1951 - July 22, 1951. (The summer segment is sometimes referred to as Here's Frank Sinatra.) Sponsors included Luden's Cough Drops and Tintair hair-care products.

== To Be Perfectly Frank (1953) ==
Sinatra was both a singer and a disk jockey in this program on NBC. Beginning November 3, 1953, the 15-minute show ran on Tuesday and Friday nights. A review in a trade publication noted: "His record selections indicated that he has retained good taste in pop music. His live songs, without the help of polished orchestration ... were still easy enough to listen to." His comments between musical segments, however, were described as "stilted monologue too contrived and superficial to describe."

Gordon Auchincloss was the program's producer and director; Bob Smith was the writer.

== The Frank Sinatra Show (1954) ==
In 1954, Sinatra had a disc jockey program sponsored by Toni Home Permanents. it ran from 8:15 to 8:30 p.m. Wednesdays and Fridays on NBC. The announcer was Jerry Laurence.

== Recordings ==
- Perfectly Frank: Classic Sinatra In A Unique Set Of Live Broadcast Performances From The Fifties audio CD from Amazon.com. The disc contains 31 selections from To Be Perfectly Frank broadcasts, 21 of which Sinatra did not record commercially.

== See also — Television Shows ==
- The Frank Sinatra Show (CBS) (1950–52)
- The Frank Sinatra Show (ABC) (1957–58)
- The Frank Sinatra Timex Show: Here's To The Ladies (ABC) (1960)
- The Frank Sinatra Timex Show: Welcome Home Elvis (ABC) (1960)
