= Hollywood Star Time (interview program) =

American radio program

- Genre: Interviews with movie stars
- Running time: 15 minutes
- Country of origin: United States
- Language(s): English
- Syndicates: Blue Network
- Announcer: Larry Keating; Gary Breckner
- Remote studios: RKO commissary, Hollywood
- Original release: February 28 (Pacific Blue Network) – November 24, 1944 (national)
- Sponsored by: RKO Pictures

Hollywood Star Time was a radio interview program in the United States. It was initially broadcast on 20 Pacific Coast and Rocky Mountain stations beginning February 28, 1944. Later the 15-minute program was carried nationwide on the Blue Network May 29, 1944 – November 24, 1944.

== Format ==
Originating in the commissary at RKO Pictures in Hollywood, Hollywood Star Time was promoted in a newspaper advertisement on its second day as "the kind of show you'd never expect in daytime ... surprise guest stars doing impromptu songs and comedy bits." Besides interviews with movie stars, episodes included "orchestras, vocalists and other entertainers," according to an ad in a movie trade publication. Some of the performances featured "highlights of forthcoming product."

== Personnel ==
Larry Keating and Gary Breckner were the show's hosts. Entertainers heard on Hollywood Star Time included Cary Grant, Ginger Rogers, Rosalind Russell, Frank Sinatra, Joan Davis, Gary Cooper, Ethel Barrymore, and many other stars of the era.

== Studio promotion ==
RKO Pictures used Hollywood Star Time as a way to promote the studio's stars and movies with the theme "What's going on at RKO?" An RKO executive, speaking at a company sales meeting, pointed to the program as a way to sell RKO movies to the public. S. Harret McCormick noted that at least eight movies in the 1944-1945 season would feature radio talent, thus providing a tie-in between the two media.

A contemporary article in a movie trade publication said that with the program, RKO was "[a]dding to its already heavy use of radio as an exploitation medium." The program was estimated to cost the studio $1 million per year. The actual cost of air time alone was $546,136.

Besides general promotion of the studio's stars and productions, the program offered a benefit to local theaters that were RKO affiliates. At the end of each program, a local announcer provided a one-minute plug with names of theaters and show dates for RKO movies that were playing locally.

An article in the trade publication Motion Picture Daily described RKO's use of Hollywood Star Time as "[c]continuing the trend of film companies to extend the use of radio promotions to make up for promotional losses through reduced space in newspapers and magazines." It added that soon after Hollywood Star Time went national, MGM planned to begin a thrice weekly program on Mutual.

The broadcasting trade publication Billboard reported that the program was "being watched by other film factories to see how pic [sic] plugs go over with the public." It described the program as an effort by the Blue Network to attract listeners' interest to daytime programs "that are on a par with after-dark offerings."

In the end, the network promotional efforts by RKO and MGM were not satisfactory to the two companies. RKO ended Hollywood Star Time November 24, 1944, and MGM ended Screen Test December 8, 1944. Both companies shifted their advertising to spot announcements.

== See also ==
- Hollywood Hotel
