= The Court of Human Relations =

American old-time radio human-interest program

- Other names: True Story Court of Human Relations
- Country of origin: United States
- Language: English
- TV adaptations: The Court of Human Relations
- Starring: Percy Hemus
- Announcer: Charles O'Connor; Paul Douglas
- Written by: William Sweets
- Directed by: William Sweets
- Produced by: William Sweets
- Original release: January 1, 1934 – January 1, 1939

The Court of Human Relations is an American old-time radio human-interest program, pioneering the popular judicial genre that would later transform into televised entertainment. It was broadcast on NBC, CBS, and Mutual at various times, beginning January 1, 1934, and ending January 1, 1939. Sometimes referred to as True Story Court of Human Relations, not only was it radio's first courtroom series, but it was "one of the first sponsored programs ever carried on CBS."

== Format ==
Episodes of The Court of Human Relations featured actual court cases that were re-created by actors. Michele Hilmes, in Only Connect: A Cultural History of Broadcasting in the United States, described the program as "a forerunner of much of the material on Court TV or Judge Judy."

Material for the program came from articles in True Story magazine, which also sponsored the show. In Media Lost and Found, media historian Erik Barnouw (who directed some episodes of the program) wrote:

In a typical story a young woman tells of being seduced, then abandoned, by some fellow who proves unworthy. She, after bearing a child out of wedlock, is trying hard to put her life together again. The end was always moral, but True Story owed its success to making sure that its readers — later its radio listeners — first savored fully the adventure of a sinful liaison.

== Audience response ==
Listeners were asked to arrive at their own verdicts for each case presented and to submit those verdicts by mail. The sponsor awarded prizes for the best responses each week. Workers in the Contest Department of McFadden Publications, publisher of True Story magazine, sorted the verdicts that arrived by the thousands weekly. Elizabeth W. Neil, who supervised the processing, said that verdicts arrived "from all sorts of addresses upon all kinds of stationery." She added that people who submitted verdicts include "employees of big business concerns ... housewives ... [and] professional men, lawyers dominating this class."

== Personnel ==
The program's one continuing character was the judge, played by Percy Hemus. Actors who often appeared in supporting roles included Lucille Wall, Helene Dumas, Florence Baker, Rita Vale, Hanley Stafford, Wilmer Walter, Vera Allen, Alice Reinheart, Ned Wever, and Betty Worth. Announcers were Charles O'Connor and Paul Douglas. Arnold Johnson provided music. William Sweets wrote, produced, and directed.

== Broadcast schedule ==
| Starting Date | Ending Date | Network | Duration |
|---|---|---|---|
| January 1, 1934 | April 22, 1934 | NBC | 45 minutes |
| May 4, 1934 | August 30, 1935 | CBS | 30 minutes |
| September 6, 1935 | May 26, 1938 | NBC | 30 minutes |
| October 9, 1938 | January 1, 1939 | Mutual | 30 minutes |

Source: On the Air: The Encyclopedia of Old-Time Radio

== Film ==
In the second half of the 1930s, Columbia Pictures produced a series of short subjects (10 minutes long) based on The Court of Human Relations. The first, "Mad Money", was shown in "125 key cities" beginning on September 4, 1936, with additional episodes scheduled for monthly production. B. K. Blake was the series' producer and director. The films were based on material from True Story and other McFadden publications. The series was promoted on the air during broadcasts of the program.

== Television ==
A daily afternoon version of The Court of Human Relations began on NBC-TV on June 22, 1959, and ended on August 21, 1959. A. L. Alexander, the host of A. L. Alexander's Mediation Board, was the program's creator, producer, and moderator. The show replaced Haggis Baggis in the network's lineup. Three mediators joined Alexander each day, with two cases presented in each episode. The program was panned by William Ewald, a columnist for United Press International. In a column printed in the June 24, 1959, issue of the New Castle (Pennsylvania) News, he described the show as "just a cheap peep show, a keyhole cavalcade, and a rather mournful reflection on the taste of TV programmers."

In 1960, 50 half-hour episodes of the program were available for syndication.
