= The Housewives' Protective League =

CBS radio program

The Housewives' Protective League, or HPL, was a daily CBS radio program created by Fletcher Wiley that aired from 1948 through 1962 and was hosted by Galen Drake over CBS-affiliated KSFO in San Francisco, and CBS-owned KNX in Los Angeles.

Wiley had the first HPL program on KNX in Los Angeles in 1934. Drake began his version on KQW in San Francisco in 1940. Paul Gibson began one on WBBM in Chicago in 1942. Drake began another version on WJZ in New York City in 1954.

The show highlighted a number of topics pertaining to homemakers of that time, including advice and stories about childrearing, cooking, and irreverent topics and advertised a variety of products pre-approved by a panel of housewives. HPL was produced by Allen Grey, who also produced the show's predecessor, Coffee Break. The show successfully marketed a variety of household goods, Grey would regularly correspond with popular brands such as Kirsh Beverages Inc, Dover Foods, Inc, and Fairway Foods, among others. HPL was so product-oriented that Drake once said "I'm not a radio star, I'm a partner in a client's business when I get his product to sell"

In 1947 CBS purchased the HPL productions from Wiley for a reported $1 million. The New York Times reported, "The league will become a CBS division, and the programs it controls which have been broadcast locally by WJZ for the last three years, are shortly to move to WCBS ..." At that time, broadcasters on the HPL staff included Lee Adams, Drake, Gibson, Lewis Martin, John Trent, and Burritt Wheeler. By November 1949, HPL had programs on nine stations in major American cities.
