= List of U.S. radio programs =

The radio programs listed below are all from the United States.

== 0–9 ==
- 15 Minutes with Bing Crosby (1931)
- 2000 Plus (1950–1952)
- 2000X (2000)
- 21st Precinct (1953–1956)
- The $64 Question (1950–1952)

== A ==
- A Christmas Sing with Bing (1955–1962), annual program of Christmas music.
- The A&P Gypsies, variety (1930, NBC-Red, 8:30–9:30 p.m. Mondays). The host and band leader was Harry Horlick. Announcers were Phillips Carlin and Milton Cross.
- A.L. Alexander's Mediation Board, advice (1943–1952, Mutual)
- The Abbott and Costello Children's Show (1947–1949, ABC)
- The Abbott and Costello Show, comedy, 30 minutes (1940, 1942–1947, NBC; 1947–1949, ABC)
- Abbott Mysteries, mystery (1945–1947, Mutual Broadcasting System, 30 minutes). Based on the novels by Frances Crane. The stars were Julie Stevens as Jean Abbott and Charles Webster as Pat Abbott. The writers included Howard Merrill and Ed Adamsom.
- ABC Mystery Theater, mystery (1951–1954), ABC
- The Abe Burrows Show, comedy (1947–1948, CBS, 15 minutes)
- Abie's Irish Rose, comedy (1942–1944, NBC, 8:00–8:30 p.m. Sunday)
- Academy Award (radio), anthology (1946, CBS, 30 minutes). Music: Leith Stevens. Producer: Lee Engelbach. Adaptations: Frank Wilson.
- Accordiana (1934, CBS, 8:30–9:00 p.m. Tuesday), with soprano Vivienne Segal, tenor Oliver Smith, and the Abe Lyman Orchestra.
- Acousticon Hour, (1927–1928, NBC, 5:30–6:00 p.m. Sundays)
- Action, anthology series (1945); one episode: High Explosive with Jane Wyatt, Robert Lowery, and star and narrator William Gargan.
- The Adam Carolla Show (2006–2009)
- Add a Line, game, (1949, ABC, 30 minutes). Host: John Nelson.
- The Adele Clark Show, variety, (1945–1946, ABC, 30 minutes). Host and Singer: Adele Clark. Announcer: Gene Kirby. Music: Jack Kelly and his orchestra.
- Adopted Daughter (1937–1941)
- Adult Education Series (1938–1957)
- Adventure Parade, anthology (1946–1949, MBS, 15 minutes). Host/Storyteller: John Griggs. Announcer: George Hogan.
- Adventures by Morse, adventure (1944, syndicated, 30 minutes). Elliott Lewis, David Ellis, and Russell Thorson as Bart Friday. Barton Yarborough as Skip Turner. Writer/Producer: Carlton E. Morse.
- Adventures in Odyssey (1987–present)
- The Adventures of Babe Ruth
- The Adventures of Bill Lance, crime drama (1947–1948, ABC, 30 minutes). Gerald Mohr as Bill Lance. Announcer: Owen James.
- The Adventures of Champion, adventure (1949–1950, MBS, 15 minutes). Adventures of Gene Autry's horse, Champion.
- The Adventures of Christopher Wells, crime drama (1947–1948, CBS, 30 minutes). Myron McCormick and Les Damon as Christopher Wells. Charlotte Lawrence and Vicki Vola as Stacy McGill. Orchestra: Peter von Streeden.
- The Adventures of Dick Cole, adventure (1942, syndicated, 30 minutes). Dick Cole was a comic book character. Leon Janney played Dick Cole. The announcer was Paul Luther and music was by Lew White.
- The Adventures of Ellery Queen (1939–1948)
- The Adventures of Father Brown, crime drama, (1945, MBS, 30 minutes)
- The Adventures of Frank Merriwell, adventure (1946–1949, NBC, 30 minutes)
- The Adventures of Frank Race, adventure (1949–1950, syndicated, 30 minutes). The stars were Tom Collins and Paul Dubov as Frank Race and Tony Barnett as Mark Donovan. The announcer was Art Gilmore, and the music by Ivan Ditmars.
- The Adventures of Gracie, (also known as The Vintage White Owl Program) comedy, (1934–1935, CBS, 30 minutes). The hosts and stars were George Burns and Gracie Allen. Vocalists included The Picken Sisters and the White Owl Buccaneers. The announcer was Bill Goodwin. Robert E. Dolan led the orchestra.
- The Adventures of Helen and Mary, children's, (1929–1934, CBS, 30 minutes). Became Let's Pretend. Estelle Levy played Helen, Patricia Ryan played Mary. Maurice Brown was the announcer.
- The Adventures of Leonidas Witherall, mystery, (1944–1945, MBS, 30 minutes). Starring Walter Hampden as Leonidas Witherall, Agnes Moorehead and Ethel Remey as Mrs. Mollett and Jack MacBryde as Police Sgt. McCloud. The announcer was Carl Caruso, with music by Milton Kane. The program was produced by Roger Bower.
- The Adventures of Maisie (1945–1952)
- The Adventures of Nero Wolfe, mystery (1943–1944, ABC, 30 minutes)
- The Adventures of Ozzie and Harriet, comedy, (1944–1954, CBS 1944–1948, NBC 1948–1949, CBS 1949, ABC 1949–1954, 30 minutes)
- The Adventures of Philip Marlowe, crime drama (1947, NBC; 1948–1951, CBS)
- The Adventures of Rin Tin Tin, adventure (1955, MBS, 30 minutes)
- The Adventures of Sam Spade (1946–1951)
- The Adventures of Superman (1940–1951)
- The Adventures of the Abbotts, mystery (1954–1955, NBC, 30 minutes). Claudia Morgan as Jean Abbott and Les Damon as Pat Abbott.
- The Adventures of the Thin Man (1941–1950)
- The Affairs of Ann Scotland (1946–1947)
- Afropop Worldwide (1988)
- Against the Storm (1939–1952)
- The Air Adventures of Jimmie Allen (1933–1943)
- The Al Franken Show (2004–2007)
- The Al Jolson Show (1932–1949)
- Al Pearce (1928–1947)
- The Aldrich Family (1939–1953)
- Alec Templeton Time (1939–1948)
- Alex Dreier (1945–1963)
- Alka-Seltzer Time.
- Alias Jimmy Valentine (1938–1939)
- The All-Negro Hour (1929–1935)
- All Songs Considered (2000–present)
- All Things Considered (1971–present)
- AllNight with Jason Smith (2005–present)
- Amanda of Honeymoon Hill (1940–1946)
- Amazing Facts (1965–present)
- The Amazing Mr. Malone.
- The Amazing Mr. Tutt (1948)
- The Amazing Nero Wolfe, mystery (1945, MBS, 30 minutes)
- America Abroad, documentary (2003– )
- America Calling (1941)
- The American Album of Familiar Music (1931–1951)
- American Catholic Radio
- American Country Countdown (1973–present)
- American Gold with Dick Bartley (1992–2009)
- American Farmer (1945–1963)
- The American Forum of the Air (1937–1956)
- American Mercury Presents: Meet the Press (1945–present)
- American Portraits (1938–1951)
- American Radio Warblers (1937–1952)
- The American School of the Air (1930–1948)
- American Top 40 (1970–1995, 1998–present)
- America's Town Meeting of the Air (1935–1956)
- Amos 'n' Andy (1929–1960)
- An Evening with Romberg (1945-1948)
- And They Call It Democracy (2005–2008)
- The Andre Kostelanetz Show (1932–1948)
- Anything Anything with Rich Russo (2008–present)
- The Answer Man (1937–1956)
- Appointment with Music (1948)
- Arch Oboler's Plays (1939–1940)
- Archie Andrews (1943–1953)
- Arco Birthday Party.
- Are We Alone? (2003–present))
- The Armstrong Theater of Today (1941–1954)
- Arnold Grimm's Daughter (1937–1942)
- The Art of Living (1949–1958)
- Art Van Damme (1940–1952)
- Arthur Godfrey Time (1945–1972)
- Arthur Godfrey's Talent Scouts (1946–1958)
- Arthur Tracy, the Street Singer (1931–1942)
- Assabe and Sabina (1944–1955, WSAN, 15 minutes weekly)
- The Atwater Kent Hour
- Audience of Two (2001–present)
- Aunt Jemima (1930–1953)
- Aunt Jenny's Real Life Stories (1937–1956)
- Aunt Mary (1944–1961)
- Author's Playhouse (1941–1945)

== B ==
- Bachelor's Children (1935–1946)
- Back to God Hour (1948–1963)
- Back to the Bible (1939–present)
- Backstage Wife (1935–1959)
- Backtrax USA (1993–present)
- The Baker's Broadcast (1933–1938)
- Bandstand USA (1949–1963)
- Barry Farber (1960–present)
- Base Camp Adventures (2020-present)
- Baukhage Talking (1942–1953)
- Bay State Rock with Carmelita (1986–present)
- Beaker Street (1966–present)
- Beat the Band (1940–1944)
- The Beatrice Kay Show (1946)
- Believe It Or Not (1930–1948)
- The Bell Telephone Hour (1940–1958)
- Ben and Brian's Big Top-20 Countdown
- The Ben Bernie Show (1931–1943)
- Benny Goodman Show (1936–1946)
- Betty and Bob (1932–1941)
- Betty Crocker Magazine of the Air (1926–1952)
- Betty Moore (1931–1943)
- Between the Bookends (1935–1956)
- Beulah (1945–1954)
- The Big Show (1950–1951)
- The Big Show (1995–present)
- The Big Show with John Boy and Billy (1986–present)
- Big Sister (1936–1952)
- Big Town (1937–1952)
- The Bill Goodwin Show (1947– )
- The Billie Burke Show (1943–1946)
- The Billy Madison Show (2005–present)
- Bing Crosby Entertains (1933–1935)
- The Bing Crosby Show (1931–1956)
- The Bird's Eye Open House (1943–1946)
- The Bishop and the Gargoyle (1936–1942)
- Black Hood (1943–1944)
- The Black Mass (1960–1965)
- The Black Museum (1951)
- Blackhawk (1950)
- Blackstone Plantation (1929–1934)
- Blind Date (1943–1946)
- Blondie (1939–1950)
- Blue Beetle (1940)
- Blue Collar Radio (2005–present)
- Boake Carter (1933–1944)
- The Bob and Ray Show (1946–1989)
- Bob and the Showgram (2004–present)
- The Bob and Tom Show (1983–present)
- The Bob Becker Program (1934–1944)
- The Bob Crosby Show (1935–1946)
- The Bob Edwards Show (2004–present)
- The Bob Hope Show (1938–1958)
- Bobby Benson and the B-Bar-B Riders (1932–1955)
- Bold Venture (1951–1952)
- Boston Symphony (1926–1957)
- Boston Blackie (1944–1950)
- The Bottom Forty
- Box 13 (1948–1949)
- Brave Tomorrow (1943–1944)
- Break the Bank (1945–1955)
- The Breakfast Club (1933–1968)
- Breakfast in Hollywood
- Breakfast with Burrows, CBS, 1949. Host: Abe Burrows.
- Breakfast with Dorothy and Dick (1945–1960)
- Breakfast with the Beatles (1976?–present)
- Breen and DeRose (1927–1939)
- Brenda Curtis (1939–1940)
- Bringing Up Father (1941)
- Broadway Is My Beat (1949–1954)
- Broadway Talks Back (1946-1947)
- The Brody Nighttime Radio Show
- Breakfast with Bubba
- Buck Rogers in the 25th Century (1932–1947)
- Bulldog Drummond (1941–1954)
- Burns and Allen (1932–1950)
- The Buzz with Scotty Rorek @ Zita Ost (2009–present)

== C ==
- Cafe Nashville (2008–present)
- Cal Tinney (1938–1953)
- California Melodies (1932–1944)
- Calling All Cars (1933–1939)
- Calling America (1939–1963)
- Camel Caravan (1933–1954)
- The Campbell Playhouse (1938–1940)
- Campusanity (2005–present)
- Can You Top This? (1940–1954)
- Capital Chat
- Captain Flagg and Sergeant Quirt (1941–1942)
- Captain Midnight (1940–1949)
- Captain Tim Healy’s Stamp Club (1933–1945)
- Car Talk (1977–present)
- The Carnation Contented Hour (1932–1951)
- Carson Robinson's Buckaroo (1932–1949)
- The Carters of Elm Street (1939–1940)
- The Casebook of Gregory Hood (1946–1950)
- Casey, Crime Photographer (1943–1955)
- The Catholic Hour (1929–1956)
- Cavalcade of America (1935–1953)
- CBS Church of the Air (1931–1956)
- CBS Radio Mystery Theater (1974–1982)
- CBS Radio Workshop
- The CEO Show with Robert Reiss
- Challenge of the Yukon (aka Sergeant Preston of the Yukon) (1938–1955)
- The Chamber Music Society of Lower Basin Street (1940–1952)
- Champion Spark Plug Hour
- Chandu the Magician
- Chaplain Jim
- Charlie Chan
- The Chase
- The Chase and Sanborn Hour (1929–1948)
- ChatterBox Video Game Radio (2004–present)
- Cheerio (1927–1940)
- Chesterfield Supper Club (1944–1950)
- Chicago Theater of the Air (1940–1954)
- Chicken Man (1966–?)
- Child's World (1947-1949)
- Chuck Cecil’s Swinging Years (1956 on)
- Church of the Air (1937–1963)
- The Cinnamon Bear
- The Cisco Kid (1942–1954)
- Cities Service Concerts (1927–1956)
- Clara, Lu, and Em (1931–1945)
- The Clark Howard Show (2003–present)
- Claudia
- Cleveland Symphony Orchestra (1933–1947)
- The Clicquot Club Eskimos (1926–1936)
- Cloak and Dagger (1950)
- Club Fifteen (1947–1953)
- Club Matinee (1937–1946)
- Club Time (1945–1954)
- Coast to Coast AM with George Noory and Ian Punnett or Art Bell and George Knapp on weekends. Formerly The Art Bell Show. (1978–present)
- Coast to Coast on a Bus (1927–1948)
- Coca-Cola Topnotchers (1930–1932)
- Coke Time (1930–1956)
- Colgate Sports Newsreel (1939–1957)
- Cook’s Travelogue (1926–1939)
- CounterSpin (2004–present)
- Counterspy (1942–1957)
- Country Top 40 (2006–present)
- The Couple Next Door (1937–1960)
- The Court of Missing Heirs (1937–1947)
- The Court of Human Relations (1934–1939)
- Crap From The Past (1992–present)
- Creeps by Night (1944)
- Cresta Blanca Carnival (1942-1944)
- Crime Classics (1953–1954)
- Crime Correspondent (1949)
- Crime Doctor (1940–1947)
- Crime Does Not Pay (1949–1952)
- Cruisin' America With Cousin Brucie (1986–1992)
- Curt Massey (1943–1962)
- Curtain Time (1938–1950)
- Curtis Institute of Music (1929–1942)

== D ==
- DVD Talk Radio
- Dan Harding's Wife (1936–1939)
- The Dan Patrick Show (1999–present)
- Dark Fantasy (1941–1942)
- A Date with Judy (1941–1950)
- Dateline (1943–1963)
- Dave & Darren (2004–present)
- The Dave Ramsey Show (1992–present)
- Dave, Shelly, and Chainsaw (1990–2022)
- David Harum (1936-1951)
- The David Lawrence Show
- The David Lee Roth Show (2006)
- Death Valley Days (1930–1944)
- Deep Space
- Defense Attorney
- Delilah
- Democracy Now! (1996–present)
- Destination Freedom (1948–1951)
- Dick Clark's Rock Roll and Remember (1982–2006)
- Dick Clark National Music Survey (1981–1986)
- The Dick Haymes Show (1944–1948)
- Dick Tracy
- Dimension X (1950–1951)
- The Dinah Shore Show
- Doc Barclay's Daughters (1939–1940)
- The Doctor's Wife (1952-1956)
- Does He Take Sugar?
- Don and Mike (1985–present)
- Don Winslow of the Navy (1939–1943)
- Don’t You Believe It (1938–1947)
- Doo-Wop Express
- Dorothy Lamour Show (1935–1949) (1935)
- Double or Nothing (1940–1953)
- Down Gilead Lane (2001-09)
- Dragnet (1949–1957)
- Dr. Christian (1937–1954)
- Dr. Demento (1974–present)
- Dr. Rock & the Medicine Show (2003–present)
- Dr. I.Q. (1939–1950)
- Dr. Standish, Medical Examiner (1948)
- Dramas of Youth (1933–1940s)
- Drene Time
- Drew Mariani
- Drew & Mike
- The Dudley & Bob Show (1994–present)
- Duffy's Tavern (1941–1951)
- Dr. Laura (1994–present)
- Loveline with Dr. Drew (1983–present)

== E ==
- ESPN Radio College GameDay Road Tour (2000–present)
- Earplay (1970s–1980s)
- Earth & Sky (1991–present)
- Eastman School of Music Symphony (1932–1942)
- Easy Aces (1931–1945)
- EcoTalk
- Ed Norris Show
- The Ed Schultz Show (2004–2014)
- Ed Sullivan Entertains (1943–1944)
- Ed Sullivan's Pipelines (1946
- The Ed Sullivan Show (1932)
- Ed Sullivan Variety (1941)
- The Eddie Bracken Show
- Eddie Condon's Jazz Concerts
- Eddie Michaux Congregation (1933–1953)
- The Eddy Duchin Show (1933–1957)
- The Eddy Howard Orchestra (1947–1956)
- The Edgar Bergern/Charlie McCarthy Show (1937–1956)
- Edward R. Murrow (1938–1959)
- El Vacilón de la Mañana (1993–present)
- Eleanor Roosevelt (1932–1949)
- The Electric Hour (1944–1946)
- Elliot in the Morning (1999–present)
- Elmer Davis News (1939–1955)
- Elvis Duran and the Morning Show (1996–present)
- Emperor Rosko Show
- Enna Jettick Melodies (1928–1939)
- The Eno Crime Club (1931–1936)
- Escape (1947–1954)
- Eternal Light (1946–1970s)
- Ethel and Albert
- "eTown" (1991–present)
- The Eveready Hour (1923–1930)
- Everything for the Boys (1944-1945)
- Everyman's Theater (1940–1941)

== F ==
- The Fabulous Dr. Tweedy (1946-1947)
- Face the Nation (1954–1970)
- Faith in Our Time (1945–1954)
- The Falcon (1943–1954)
- Falcon's Rock Block (2007–present)
- Family Hour of Stars (1948-1950)
- Family Skeleton (1953–1954)
- Family Theater (1947–1957)
- Famous Jury Trials (1936–1949)
- Father Coughlin (1930–1942)
- Fat Guys at the Movies (2013–present)
- Father Knows Best (1949–1954)
- The Fat Man (1946–1951)
- Favorite Story (1946–1949)
- The FBI in Peace and War (1944–1958)
- Fibber McGee and Molly (1935–1956)
- The Fifth Horseman (1946, NBC, Summer short-run series of eight special half-hour weekly episodes), Rare and obscure early post-World War II anti-nuclear radio docudrama serial
- The Fire Chief (1932-1935)
- Fireside chats (1933–1944)
- The Firefighters (quarter hour children's radio show)
- The First Nighter Program (1930–1953)
- The Five Mysteries Program
- The Fleischmann's Yeast Hour (1929–1936)
- Floydian Slip (1989, 1994–present)
- Flywheel, Shyster and Flywheel (1930s)
- The Ford Sunday Evening Hour (1934–1946)
- Ford Theater (1947-1949)
- Foreign Assignment (1943–1944)
- Fort Laramie (1956)
- Foreign Policy Association Program (1927–1940)
- Forever Ernest (1946)
- Four Star Playhouse (1949)
- Frances Adair (1935–1938, NBC, with soprano Frances Adair)
- Frank and Ernest (1949–1963)
- The Fred Allen Show (1932–1949)
- The Fred Waring Show (1931–1957)
- The Freddy Martin Orchestra (1932–1947)
- Frederick William Wile (1926–1936)
- The Free Beer and Hot Wings Morning Show (1997–present)
- The Free COO (Free advice for building and running a startup company) (2012–present)
- The Ford Sunday Evening Hour (1934–1946)
- Frontlines of Freedom (2007–present)
- Front Page Farrell (1941–1954)
- Frontier Gentleman (1958)
- Fry Night Fights (1937–1956)
- Fulton Lewis, Jr. (1937–1956)

== G ==
- Gabriel Heatter (1935–1960)
- Galen Drake Show (1945–1960)
- Gamenight
- Gang Busters (1935–1957)
- Garden Gate (1941–1956)
- Gaslight Gayeties (1944–1945)
- Gasoline Alley (1931–1949)
- Gateway to Hollywood (1939)
- The Gay Nineties Revue (1939–1944)
- Gene Autry's Melody Ranch (1940–1956)
- The General Mills Radio Adventure Theater (1977)
- General Motors Concerts (1934–1957)
- The George Jessel Show (1933–1954)
- The Gibson Family (1934–1935)
- The Ginny Simms Show (1942–1951)
- Glamour Manor (1944–1947)
- The Glenn Beck Program (2000–present)
- The Golden Age of Radio (1970–1977)
- The Goldbergs (1929–1947)
- Good News of 1938 (1937–1940)
- Goodwill Court (1936, NBC, 30 minutes weekly)
- The Gospel Hour (1939–present)
- The Gospel Singer (1933–1942)
- Grand Central Station (1937–1953)
- Grand Hotel (1933–1945)
- Grand Ole Opry (1925–present)
- Grand Slam (1946–1953)
- The Great Gildersleeve (1941–1957)
- The Great Sounds with Ray Otis (1986–1990)
- The Greatest Story Ever Told (1947–1956)
- The Green Hornet (1938–1952)
- The Grouch Club (1939–1940)
- The Guiding Light (1937–1952)
- Gunsmoke (1952–1961)
- Gutsy geeks (2001–present)
- Guy Lombardo Show (1929–1957)

== H ==
- H. R. Baukhage (1942–1953)
- H. V. Kaltenborn News (1930–1953)
- The Hall of Fantasy (1952–1953)
- Hallmark Hall of Fame(1948–1953)
- Hallmark Playhouse (1953–1955)
- The Halls of Ivy (1949–1952)
- Hannibal Cobb (1950–1951)
- Hap Hazard (1941–?)
- The Happiness Boys (1920s)
- The Happy-Go-Lucky Hour
- Happy Island (1944-1945)
- Happy Jack Turner (1932–1941)
- Harry Wismer Sports (1945–1955)
- Harvest of Stars (1945–1950)
- Have Gun, Will Travel (1957–1960)
- Hawaii Calls (1935–1975)
- Hawk Larabee (1946–1948)
- Heartbeat Theatre (1956–1977)
- Hedda Hopper (1939–1951)
- Helen Hayes Theater (1935–1946)
- Helpmate
- The Henry Morgan Show (1940–1951)
- Here on Earth – Radio Without Borders (2003– )
- Here, There, and Everywhere (2005–present)
- The Herd with Colin Cowherd
- The Hermit's Cave (1935? – 1944)
- Hilltop House (1937–1955)
- Hit the Jackpot (1948–1950)
- Hobby Lobby (1937–1944)
- Hogan's Daughter (1949)
- Holiday and Company
- Hollywood Showcase (1937–1948)
- Hollywood Star Preview (1947-1950)
- Home of the Brave (1941)
- Hop Harrigan (1942–1948)
- Hot and Fresh (2006–present)
- Hot Copy (1941–1944)
- The Hour of Charm (1935–1948)
- Hour of Decision (1953–present)
- Hour of Faith (1942–1956)
- House of Glass (1935–1954)
- Housekeeper’s Chat (1926–1944)
- Howard K. Smith (1945–1956)
- The Howard Stern Radio Show (until January 2006)
- The Howie Chizek Show (1972–June, 2012)
- Howie Wing (1938–1939)
- The Hilary Duff Show (1987–1990)
- The Hollering with Hammer show (2016–2017)
- Hymns of All Churches (1935-1947)

== I ==
- I Deal in Crime (1946–1948)
- I Fly Anything (1950–1951)
- I Love a Mystery (1939–1952)
- I Love Lucy (1952)
- I Was a Communist for the FBI (1952–1954)
- Iliad House (2016)
- In Person, Dinah Shore (1942–1943)
- Indie A–Z (2008–)
- Information Please (1938–1948)
- Inner Sanctum Mystery (1941–1952)
- Invitation to Learning (1940–1963)
- The Ipana Troubadors
- Irene Beasley (1930–1939)
- Irene Rich Show (1933–1944)
- Irving Aaronson Orchestra (1935, NBC)
- Island Venture (1945–1946, CBS)
- It Pays to Be Ignorant (1942–1944, 1944–1950 and 1951)
- It Pays to Be Married (1944–1955)
- It’s Your Business (1944–1956)

== J ==
- "Jack Hammer and Andre Kane (2007–present)
- Jack Armstrong the All American Boy (1933–1950)
- The Jack Benny Program (1932–1955)
- Jack Berch and His Boys (also known as The Jack Berch Show) (1935–1954)
- The Jack Carson Show (1943–1956)
- The Jack Eigen Show (1951–1971)
- Jack Kirkwood Show (1943–1953)
- The Jack Pearl Show (1932–1951)
- The Jake Muller Adventures (2018-present)
- The Jan Garber Orchestra (1934–1967)
- The Jane Pickens Show (1948–1957)
- Jean Shepherd (1948–1977)
- The Jim Bohannon Show (1993–present)
- The Jim Backus Show (1947–1958)
- The Jim Rome Show (1996–present)
- The Jimmy Wakely Show (1946–1958)
- The Joan Davis Show
- Joan Davis Time (1947–1948)
- Joanie's Tea Room (1945–1947)
- Joe and Mabel
- John R. Gambling (2000–present)
- John MacVane (1945–1956)
- John Steele, Adventurer
- John's Other Wife (1936–1942)
- Johnny Fletcher (1948)
- Johnny Mercer's Music Shop (1943)
- Johnny Modero, Pier 23 (1947)
- The Johnson Family (1941–1950)
- Jonathan Park (1990s-present)
- Joseph C. Harsch (1947–1956)
- Joyce Jordan, M.D. (1938–1955)
- Judy and Jane (1932–1947)
- The Judy Canova Show (1943–1953)
- The Jumbo Fire Chief Program (1935–1936)
- Jungle Jam and Friends: The Radio Show! (1993-present)
- Jungle Jim (1935–1954)
- Junior Miss (1942–1954)
- Just Plain Bill (1932–1955)

== K ==
- Kate Hopkins, Angel of Mercy (1939–1942)
- The Kate Smith A&P Bandwagon (1936, CBS, 8–9:00 p.m. Thursdays)
- The Kate Smith Hour (1930–1958)
- Kate Smith's Coffee Time (1935, CBS, 7:30–7:45 p.m. Tuesday–Thursday)
- Katie's Daughter
- Kay Kyser's Kollege of Musical Knowledge (1938–1949)
- Kidd Kraddick in the Morning (1992–present)
- King Biscuit Flower Hour (1973–present)
- Korn’s-A-Krackin’ (KWTO and Mutual, 1940s)
- Kraft Music Hall (1933–1949)

== L ==
- Ladies Be Seated (1943–1950)
- Land of the Lost (1944–1948)
- The Landt Trio (1928–1951)
- The Lanny Ross Show (1929–1952)
- The Larry King Show (1978–present)
- The Lars Larson Show
- The Last Chance Detectives (2004)
- Laundryland Lyrics (1929–?)
- The Laura Ingraham Show (2001–present)
- The Lazlow Jones Show (through 2005)
- Leading Question (1953–1963)
- Leave It to Joan (1949)
- Legends of Success (2002–present)
- The Les Paul Show
- Let George Do It (1946–1955)
- Let's Dance (1934–1935)
- Let's Pretend (1937–1954)
- Life and Love of Dr. Susan
- Life Can Be Beautiful (1938–1954)
- Life Online with Bob Parsons (2005–present)
- The Life of Riley (1944–1951)
- The Light of the World (1940–1950)
- Lights Out (1934–1947)
- The Linda Chavez Show
- Linda's First Love (1939–1950)
- Little Orphan Annie (1931–1943)
- Little Steven's Underground Garage (2002–present)
- Live from the 60s with the Real Don Steele (1988–1993)
- Living Dramas of the Bible (1937)
- The Lone Ranger (1933–1954)
- Lonely Women (1942–1943)
- Longines Symphonette (1943–1958)
- Looking Over the Week (1933–1946)
- The Louella Parsons Show (1931–1951)
- Louisiana Hayride (1948–1958)
- Lone Journey (1940–1952)
- Long John Nebel
- Lorenzo Jones (1937–1955)
- Lowell Thomas and the News (1930–1976)
- Lum and Abner (1931–1953)
- The Lutheran Hour (1930–present)
- Lux Radio Theatre (1934–1955)
- Lux Summer Theatre (1953)

== M ==
- Ma Perkins (1933–1960)
- Magic Island
- Major Bowes Capitol Family Hour (1925–1941)
- Major Bowes Amateur Hour (1935–1946)
- Make Believe Town (1949-1951)
- Make It Happen With Michelle McCullough (2013–present)
- The Man Called X (1944–1952)
- The Man Behind the Gun (1942-1944)
- Manhattan Merry-Go-Round (1933–1949)
- The March of Time (1931–1945)
- MARINA's Musical Health Talk (2012–Present)
- The Mark & Brian Show (1987–present)
- Mark Trail (1950–1952)
- Marketplace (1989–present)
- Martin Agronsky (1944–1956)
- The Mary Lee Taylor Show (1937–1954)
- Mary Margaret McBride (1937–1954)
- Mary Small (1934–1946)
- Maurice, the Singer of Romance (1935, NBC, Morrie Abrams, singer)
- MaslowWoman Live Radio (2012–present, radio network, Dr. W. RICHE, Host)
- Meet Corliss Archer (1943–1955)
- Meet Mr. Weeks (1939–1941)
- The Mercury Theatre on the Air (1938)
- Meredith Willson (1936–1954)
- Message of Israel (1935–1956)
- Metropolitan Opera (1931–present)
- Metropolitan Opera Auditions of the Air (1935–1958)
- The Michael Medved Show (1996–present)
- The Michael Reagan Radio Show (1992–present)
- Michael Shayne
- The Mickey Mouse Theater of the Air (1938)
- Midweek Hymn Sing (1926–1936)
- Midweek Politics (2005–present)
- The Mike Malloy Show (2004–present)
- Mike and the Mad Dog (1989–2008)
- The Mildred Bailey Revue (1933–1944)
- The Milton Berle Show (1939–1948)
- The Mixing Board with Paul Stewart (2011–present)
- Modern Romances (1936–1955)
- Molle Mystery Theater (1943–1954)
- Mom's the Word (2007–present)
- Monday Morning Headlines (1944–1956)
- Monitor (1955–1975)
- Morgan Beatty News (1942–1953)
- Morning Edition (1979–present)
- Morning Sedition (2004–2005)
- Morning Sickness with Eric and Harrison (2006–present)
- The Morton Downey Show (1930–1951)
- Mr. and Mrs. Blandings (1951)
- Mr. and Mrs. North (1942–1954)
- Mr. District Attorney (1939–1953)
- Mr. Keen, Tracer of Lost Persons (1937–1955)
- Murder at Midnight (1946–1947)
- Murder by Experts (1949-1951)
- Murder Is My Hobby (1945–1946)
- Music & the Spoken Word (Mormon Tabernacle Choir) (1929–present)
- Music Appreciation Hour (1928–1941)
- Music from Hollywood (1937–1950)
- Music That Satisfies (1932–1945)
- Musical Album (1927–1936)
- My Favorite Husband (1948–1951)
- My Friend Irma (1947–1954)
- My Little Margie (1952–1955)
- Myrt and Marge (1931–1947)
- The Mysterious Traveler (1943–1952)
- Mystery Chef (1931–1945)
- Mystery Is My Hobby

== N ==
- National Barn Dance (1933–1950)
- National Church of the Air (1927–1956)
- The National Farm and Home Hour (1929–1958)
- National Radio Forum (1931–1943)
- The Navy Hour (1930–1954)
- NBC Bandstand (1956-1959)
- NBC Music Appreciation Hour (1929–1941)
- NBC Symphony Orchestra (1937–1954)
- The Neal Boortz Show (1977–present)
- Nell Vinick (1929–1942)
- Nelson Olmsted (1939–1951)
- Nestle Chocolateers (1030–?)
- The New Adventures of Sherlock Holmes (1939–1947)
- The New Adventures of Nero Wolfe (1950–1951)
- New York Philharmonic Orchestra (1927–1963)
- News on the Hour (1950, NBC, with newscaster Robert Abernethy)
- Newsroom of the Air (1940–1955)
- Nick Carter, Master Detective (1943–1955)
- Nightbeat (1950–1952)
- Nights with Alice Cooper (2004–present)
- Niteshift with Mike Sargent (1990–present)
- Noah Webster Says (1942–1951)
- Northwestern University Reviewing Stand (1936–1963)
- Now Hear This (1951)
- Nutmeg Junction (2018 to present)

== O ==
- Of Men and Books (1939–1948)
- Official Detective (1946–1957)
- Oklahoma City Symphony Orchestra (1949–1963)
- The Old-Fashioned Revival Hour (1936–1961)
- Old Gold on Broadway (1933–1948)
- On the Line with Bob Considine (1947–1963)
- One Man's Family (1932–1959)
- One Night Stand (1942–1962)
- The O’Neills (19343–1943)
- Open Forum (1961–2011)
- Open House Party (1988–present)
- The Opie & Anthony Show (1994–present)
- The Original Amateur Hour
- Our Gal Sunday (1937–1959)
- Our Miss Brooks (1948–1957)
- Our Secret Weapon (1942–1943), CBS Radio, counterpropaganda talk with Rex Stout
- Ozark Jubilee (1953–1960) on ABC Radio
- On Air With Ryan Seacrest (2004–Present)
- On the Move With Enrique Santos (2018–present)

== P ==
- Painted Dreams (1930–1938?)
- The Passing Parade (1938–1949)
- Passport to Romance (1946)
- Pat Novak for Hire
- Pat O'Daniel and His Hillbilly Boys (1930s)
- Paul Harvey (1952–2008)
- The Paul Whiteman Hour (1927–1954)
- The Pause That Refreshes (1934–1948)
- Paws & Tales (2001-present)
- Penthouse Party
- People Are Funny (1942–1960)
- The People's Platform (1938–1952)
- Pepper Young's Family (1936–1959)
- The Perry Como Show (1943–1955)
- Perry Mason (1943–1955)
- Pete Kelly's Blues (1951)
- The Peter Lind Hayes Show (1954–1955)
- The Phil Cook Show (1930–1952)
- The Phil Harris-Alice Faye Show (1948–1954)
- Phil Hendrie Show
- The Philadelphia Symphony (1932–1957)
- The Philip Morris Playhouse (1939–1953)
- The Phil's Gang Show (1997–present)
- Pick and Pat (1934–1945)
- Planetary Radio (2002–present)
- Planet Mikey (2005–present)
- The Playhouse (2000–present)
- Poets Cafe (2002–present)
- Police Headquarters (1932)
- Portia Faces Life (1940–1951)
- Pot o' Gold (1939–1947)
- A Prairie Home Companion (1974–present)
- The Preston and Steve Show (1999–February 2005, May 2005–present)
- Problem Corner
- Professor Quiz (1936–1948)
- Proudly We Hail (1947–1957)

== Q ==
- Queen for a Day (1945–1957)
- Quiet, Please (1947–1949)
- Quiz Kids (1940–1953?)

== R ==
- R&B Showcase Radio Show (1986–present)
- Radio Bible Class (1940–1961)
- Radio Bible Hour (1935–present)
- Radio City Music Hall (1932–1942)
- Radio Daze (1996–1998)
- The Radio Factor with Bill O'Reilly
- The Radio Guild (1929–1940)
- Rambling with Gambling (1925–2000)
- The Ranch Boys (1934–1956)
- Ray Perkins (1930–1941)
- Raymond Gram Swing (1936–1951)
- The Red Foley Show (1951–1961)
- Red Ryder (1942–1951)
- The Red Skelton Show (1941–1952)
- Religion in the News (1933–1950)
- Renfro Valley Barn Dance
- The Richard Maxwell Show (1929–1946)
- Rick and Bubba (2002–2006)
- Rick Dees Weekly Top 40 (1983–present)
- Rick Rydell (2001–present)
- Right to Happiness (1939–1960)
- Rin-Tin-Tin (1930–1955)
- Ring of Fire (2004–present)
- Road of Life (1937–1959)
- The Rob Arnie and Dawn Show (1996–present)
- The Robert Q. Lewis Show (1945–1959)
- The Rochester Orchestra (1929–1942)
- Rock & Religion Radio Show (A.K.A. Rock Scope) (1977–1981)
- Romance (1932–1957)
- The Romance of Helen Trent (1933–1960)
- Rosemary (1944–1955)
- Roy Rogers Show (1944–1955)
- The Rubinoff Orchestra (1931–1943)
- The Rudy Vallée Show (1929–1947)
- Rush Limbaugh (nationally 1988–present)
- Rovers Morning Glory (2003–present)

== S ==
- Say it loud Teen Radio
- Sacred Heart Program
- The Sammy Kaye Show (1937–1956)
- Saturday Night Serenade (1936–1948)
- The Savage Nation with Michael Savage (2000–present)
- SCORE (306) Radio: Counselors to America's Small Business (1998–present) on WVOX
- "The Scott Vincent Show" (1955–1959)
- Scattergood Baines (1938–1950)
- Screen Directors Playhouse (1949-1951)
- The Screen Guild Theater (1939–1952)
- The Sealed Book (1945)
- The Sean Hannity Show (nationally 2001–present)
- Second Husband (1937–1946)
- The Second Mrs. Burton (1946–1960)
- Selected Shorts
- Sergeant Preston of the Yukon (1946–1955)
- Seth Parker (1929–1939)
- The Shadow (1937–1954)
- Shell Chateau (1935–1937)
- Silver Theatre (1937–1950)
- Sinfonietta (1935–1945)
- Sing It Again (1948-1951)
- Singin' Sam (1930–1947)
- The Singing Lady
- Singing Story Lady (1932–1941)
- The Six Shooter (1952–1954)
  - Sleep No More
- Skippy Hollywood Theatre (syndicated prior to December 1, 1949; CBS 1949-1950)
- Smilin' Ed Maxwell Show (1932–1941)
- Smoke Dreams (1928–1946)
- Snow Village Sketches (1928–1947)
- The Somerset Maugham Theater (1951-1952)
- Songs by Dinah Shore (1941–1942)
- The Sound of Young America
- The Southernaires Quartette (1930–1951)
- Space Patrol (1952–1955)
- The Sportsbash
- The Stan Freberg Show (1957)
- Stan Lomax (1935–1944)
- Star and the Story (1944)
- StarDate (1978–date)
- Stella Dallas (1938–1955)
- Stoopnagle and Budd (1930–1937)
- Stop Me If You've Heard This One (1939–1948)
- Stop the Music (1948–1952)
- The Story of Mary Marlin (1935–1952)
- Story Time (1929–1956)
- Strictly from Dixie (1941–1954)
- The Strange Dr. Weird (1944–1945)
- Strike It Rich (1947–1957)
- Stroke of Fate (1953)
- Studio One (1947-1948)
- Suspense (1942–1962)
- Sunday at the Memories (1973–1990)
- Swingin' Years (1956–2006)

== T ==
- T3: Trends, Tips & Tools for Everyday Living" (2003–2004) on WVOX
- Take It or Leave It (1940–1950)
- Talent Round-Up (ABC, 1955)
- Tales of Fatima (1949)
- Tales of the Texas Rangers (1950–1952)
- Tales from the Crypt (2000)
- Tarzan (1932–1953)
- The Ted Lewis Show (1934–1948)
- The Ted Steele Orchestra (1939–1955)
- Tech Talk Radio (2000–present)
- Terry and the Pirates (1937–1948)
- Texaco Star Theater (1938–1948)
- That Brewster Boy (1941–1945)
- Theatre Guild on the Air (1945–1954)
- The Lives of Harry Lime (1951–1952)
- The Third Shift (2004–present)
- This Amazing America (1940)
- This American Life (1995–present)
- This Changing World (1944-1945)
- This I Believe (1951–1955, 2005–present)
- This Is Nora Drake (1947–1959)
- This Is Your FBI (1945–1953)
- The Thom Hartmann Program (2003–present)
- The Three Suns (1940–1956)
- Three X Sisters (1932–1937)
- Time After Island Time
- Today's Children (1932–1938)
- Tom Corbett, Space Cadet (1952)
- The Tom Joyner Morning Show (1994–present)
- The Tom Leykis Show (1994–present)
- Tom Mix (1933–1950)
- Tommy & the Bull (1990–1995)
- Tommy & Rumble (1995–present)
- Tommy Riggs and Betty Lou (1938–1946)
- Tom Terris (1932–1941)
- The Tommy Dorsey Show (1937–1947)
- This is Hell (1998–present)
- Today's Homeowner with Danny Lipford (2009–present)
- Tony Won's Scrapbook (1930–1943)
- Total Axxess (on)
- The Town Crier (1929–1943)
- Too Beautiful to Live (2008–present)
- Treasury Agent (1946–1958)
- True Confessions (1944–1958)
- True Detective Mysteries (1929–1958)
- True or False (1938–1956)
- Truth or Consequences (1940–1957)
- Tune Detective (1931–1947)
- Tune Up, America!
- Twenty Questions (1946–1954)

== U ==
- Uncle Don (1928–1947)
- University of Chicago Round Table (1933–1955)
- Uncle Charlie's Tent Show (1935)

== V ==
- Valiant Lady (1938–1952)
- Vic and Sade (1932–1957)
- Victory Parade (1942)
- Victory Theater (1942)
- Victor Lindlahr (1936–1953)
- Viva America CBS (1942–1949)
- The Vintage White Owl Program (see The Adventures of Gracie)
- The Voice of Experience (1933–1944)
- The Voice of Firestone (1928–1957)
- The Voice of Truth (1943–present)
- Voice of Prophecy (1941–present)
- Vox Pop (1935–1947)
- Voyage of the Scarlet Queen (1947–1948)

== W ==
- Waffles Radio (2006–present)
- Walter Winchell's Journal (1932–1955)
- Walton & Johnson
- Waltz Time (1933–1948)
- Washington Merry-Go-Round (1935–1953)
- We Love and Learn (1942–1951)
- We, the People (1936–1951)
- Weekend 22 (? – Present)
- Weekend Edition (1985–present)
- Wendy Warren and the News (1947–1958)
- Whad'Ya Know? (1985–present)
- What's My Name? (1938–1950)
- What's the Name of That Song? (1944–1954)
- When a Girl Marries (1939–1958)
- The Whisperer (1951)
- The Whistler (1942–1955)
- The Wife Saver (1932–1942)
- Wilderness Road (1936–1945)
- Wings of Healing (1952–1963)
- Wings Over Jordan (1939–1949)
- The Witch's Tale (1931–1938)
- The Woolworth Hour (1955–1957)
- Woman in White (1938–1947)
- The Woody Herman Show (1945–1956)
- Words and Music (1931–1945)
- World News Today (1941–1963)
- Worldview (1994–present)
- Wrestling Observer Live (1999–present)

== X ==
- X Minus One (1955–1958)
- The Xavier Cugat Show (1933–1944)

== Y ==
- You Bet Your Life (1947–1950)
- Young Dr. Malone (1939–1960)
- Young Love (1949-1950)
- Young Widder Brown (1938–1956)
- Your Business Matters (2000–2004) on WVOX
- Your Goodtime Oldies Magazine (1992–1995)
- Your Hit Parade (1935–1959)
- Your Story Hour (1949–present)
- Yours Truly, Johnny Dollar (1949–1962)

== Z ==
- The Zane Grey Show (1947-1948)
- The Zero Hour (1973–1974)
- The Ziegfeld Follies of the Air (1932, 1936)

== See also ==
- List of Canadian radio programs
- List of old-time radio people
- List of old-time radio programs
- List of UK radio programs
