= Acousticon Hour =

1927–1928 American radio program

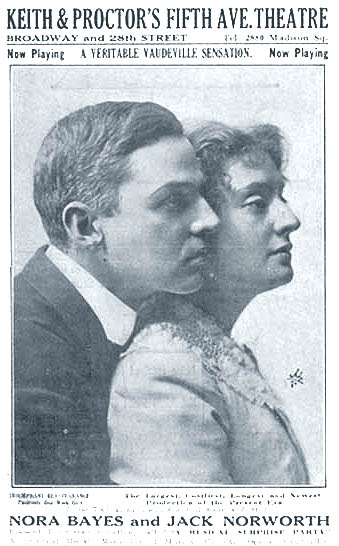
Jack Norworth and Nora Bayes, c. 1908-13. Norworth was heard on the Acousticon Hour in March 1928.

Acousticon Hour was a "musicale" radio program aired during 1927 and 1928 on NBC. It offered selections from classical music, orchestral favorites, operas and operettas.

== History ==
The show was sponsored by the company that marketed the Acousticon brand hearing aid, invented by Miller Reese Hutchison. As broadcast historian Elizabeth McLeod has noted, in the 1920s a product name used in a show's title was considered a more acceptable form of advertising than the use of intrusive commercial messages:

The most popular program format of the late twenties was the sponsored musical feature. It could be a large symphonic group, a dance orchestra, or a song-and-patter team — and it would usually carry the sponsor's name. The A&P Gypsies, for example — a large, genre-crossing orchestra conducted by Harry Horlick. The Ipana Troubadors — a hot dance band directed by Sam Lanin. The Goodrich Zippers — a banjo-driven orchestra conducted by Harry Reser, when he wasn't leading the same group under the name of The Clicquot Club Eskimos. Everyone remembers The Happiness Boys, Billy Jones and Ernie Hare -- but what about Scrappy Lambert and Billy Hillpot, who performed exactly the same sort of material as Trade and Mark, The Smith Brothers. The list is endless: The Silvertown Cord Orchestra, featuring the Silver Masked Tenor. The Sylvania Foresters. The Flit Soldiers -- yet another Harry Reser group. The Champion Sparkers. The Fox Fur Trappers. The Ingram Shavers, who were the Ipana Troubadours on alternate Wednesdays. The Yeast Foamers. The Planters Pickers. And, the magnificently named Freed-Eisemann Orchestradians. All playing pretty much the same sorts of music, all announced by Phillips Carlin or John S. Young or Alwyn Bach or Milton Cross in pretty much the same sort of stiffly formal style.

The Acousticon Hour was not a 60-minute show as the title suggests. It was a 30-minute program which NBC broadcast from 5:30 to 6 p.m. on Sunday afternoons. In 1928, the Acousticon male quartet sang "The Palms" in recognition of Palm Sunday. The singer-songwriter Jack Norworth was a guest in March 1928, and the pianist-songwriter Jean Schwartz appeared as a guest the following month. Selections from the operas Carmen and La Gioconda were included in the April 1928 schedule.

Jack Burton was the program's announcer, director, and writer. Performers who made their network premieres on the show included Lina Abarbanell, Donald Brian, Shelton Brooks, Victor Moore, Jack Norworth, Blanche Ring, Julia Sanderson, Jean Schwartz, Six Brown Brothers, and Sophie Tucker. Broadcasts also featured the Acousticon orchestra and the Acousticon male quartet.

The show's final broadcast occurred on April 22, 1928.

== See also ==
- List of U.S. radio programs
- Old-time radio

== Listen to ==
- Jack Norworth (five songs)
