= House of Mystery (disambiguation) =

House of Mystery is a series of comics.

House of Mystery may also refer to:

== Film ==
- The House of Mystery (1923 film), a French silent serial film
- The House of Mystery (1933 film), a French crime film
- The House of Mystery (1934 film), an American pre-code mystery horror film directed by William Nigh
- House of Mystery, American alternative title of At the Villa Rosa
- House of Mystery (1961 film), a British supernatural mystery film

== Literature ==
- The House of Mystery, an 1898 novel by Richard Marsh
- The House of Mystery, a 1906 play by Langdon McCormick and a novelization of the play by Grace Miller White
- The House of Mystery, a 1910 novel by Will Irwin
- House of Mystery (Vertigo), an American occult and horror-themed comic book anthology series

== Radio ==
- The House of Mystery (radio series) (1945–1949), an American radio dramatic anthology
