= Thesaurus (disambiguation) =

A thesaurus is a reference work that helps find words with similar meanings.

Thesaurus may also refer to:

- Thesaurus (information retrieval), a form of controlled vocabulary that seeks to dictate semantic manifestations of metadata in the indexing of content objects
- Thesaurus (radio transcription service), a syndication service that provided transcribed programs for use by radio stations
- Thesaurus (album), a 1969 album by Clare Fischer
