= Olga Druce =

American producer, public speaker, and actress

- Occupations: Radio; television producer; public speaker; actress

Olga Druce was an American radio and television producer, public speaker, and actress.

== Early years ==
Born Olga Droshnicop, Druce was the daughter of Mr. and Mrs. Samuel Droshnicop, and she had a sister. Her father was a businessman in imports and exports. After attending Girls' High School in Brooklyn, New York, Druce graduated from Smith College in 1931. At Smith she chaired the Senior Dramatics Committee and had the lead in the senior play, portraying Katharina in The Taming of the Shrew. She also was a member of Phi Kappa Psi honorary society and the Dramatic Association and was an honor graduate. She studied at the Friedrich Wilhelm University of Berlin, the Ludwig-Maximilians-Universität München, and the Max Reinhardt School in Germany. Her activities in writing and producing plays began during her time at the Reinhardt School, as did her work with children. While she was in Germany, she also acted in provincial theaters. She returned to the United States, where she had been born, "after the Reichstag fire and the advent of Hitler".

== Career ==
=== Stage and career change ===
Druce acted in the Broadway plays Judgment Day, Moon Over Mulberry Street, Eternal Road, and Time of Your Life, before her interests changed, and she began to focus more on children. Critic Burns Mantle wrote of her work in Moon over Mulberry Street, "There is a pleasant young woman named Olga Druce who does nicely by the ingenue role." Another review of the same play said, "I recommend the quiet acting of Miss Druce as Nina, particularly."

In 1939, Druce was on the staff of the League Against Intolerance. For two years she ran the Harlem Interracial Youth Center while she worked with children in hospitals and schools. Writing, directing, and producing plays for children in settlement houses made Druce want to better understand how to create entertainment that would be beneficial for children while it held their interest. That desire led her to study at the Washington School for Psychiatry and The New School for Social Research with a concentration on children's interests and their learning.

=== Wartime activities ===
During World War II, Druce wrote a sketch, Home Is Our Nation, that was presented by actors of the American Theatre Wing (ATW). She also was co-chair of the Committee for Youth in Wartime, which was sponsored by the ATW. The committee organized projects in which actors and theater technicians went to schools and settlement houses to teach adolescents about aspects of theatrical professions. In one example, ballerina Sono Osato, who was performing in One Touch of Venus on Broadway, went to the ATW-sponsored Youth Association in Harlem, where 40 youngsters wanted to learn about dancing and hoped to produce their own musical comedy revue. Druce also spoke at events for the United Service Organizations, American Red Cross, United States Office of War Information, and at bond drives.

=== Radio and television ===
Druce considered drama to be "the most powerful, forceful educational medium". In her view, the educational impact of broadcast programs went beyond imparting facts to teaching children about human relations.

Druce's early involvement with radio included writing scripts for prominent physicians who talked about health, working with medical and psychiatric problems of children for the Baby Institute, and working as a consultant for the program This Changing World (TCW). She used her background in theater and her studies in psychiatry to analyze the characters on TCW and to give the actors understanding of how to portray their characters. Her work was described as "one of the most serious efforts on the part of radio to raise the level of the programs given daytime adult listeners."

Druce wrote for The Adventures of Superman and then worked on The House of Mystery as a writer. She progressed from creating scripts for The House of Mystery to producing it, and eventually she became its director. In November 1949, the Republic of Haiti recognized Druce with a luncheon and an award for her efforts to help Americans understand that republic better via an episode of that program. She also produced and directed programs such as Life Can Be Beautiful and When a Girl Marries.

When Druce became the producer of the television program Captain Video and His Video Rangers in April 1951, she was "the only woman in the field of television who is responsible for a multi-weekly, scripted, half-hour dramatic television program." Under Druce's leadership, Captain Video veered away from the use of deadly weapons that were typical in other adventure programs on radio and TV. Such devices were replaced by ray guns, which incapacitated a person for a few minutes. Druce also replaced the show's writers, whose backgrounds were in TV, with science-fiction writers. Her production approach to the show included using fewer special effects than most children's shows used. She applied "the theory that the story such a program tells its kids is more important than trick shots."

=== Outreach ===
Druce's concern with attitudes about children's programs on radio took her beyond the broadcasting studios. She spoke to legislators and educators on the topic and spoke on "Education Through Radio" to a meeting of the International Congress on Mental Health in London in August 1948. She also lectured about mental health for a meeting of the Massachusetts Parent Teachers Association.

Other topics of speeches by Druce included the need for public support for better radio programs. Speaking to students at Winston-Salem State Teachers College, she said, "The public has never shown that it will support a program it likes as vigorously as it will criticize a program it doesn't like." She noted that radio was a business — not a charity — and said that most people did not think about buying products of sponsors whose programs they like. She made similar comments to local groups of the American Association of University Women and to community radio councils.

In 1949, when Druce lectured on the summer faculty at the University of Colorado, she told students that some people condemned mystery programs without having listened to them.

==== The Universal Heckler ====
Druce wrote a play, The Universal Heckler, with input from representatives of the New York Committee on Mental Hygiene, the National Committee for Mental Hygiene, and the International Committee for Mental Hygiene. Its focus was the negative ways in which anxiety can affect life in families. After the play's premiere at the American Orthopsychiatric Association's annual meeting in New York, it was described as a "sound piece of mental hygiene as well as a play of great entertainment value." The Universal Heckler was presented under the auspices of ATW as one of its efforts to produce short plays for events of community service.

After The Universal Heckler was performed five times in the United States, it was presented at the International Congress on Mental Health in London in 1948, which provided the first opportunity for most of the 500 delegates to witness "the theatre used as a media for psychological instruction". Most of the group viewed the play favorably.

=== Philosophy ===
Differing with many people in the business, Druce said that "suspense, change of pace, and good writing" were basic for success in radio, whereas some of her peers "claim there must be a lurid murder every five minutes to get a good rating on mysteries". When she supervised children's programs, she did not allow use of "murders, blood, loud screams", which she described as "nightmare material" for children.

Druce produced The House of Mystery with an educational purpose in mind. Although its episodes dealt with "ghost stories in the usual suspenseful and exciting style", each episode concluded by demonstrating a rational explanation for seemingly supernatural activities. In one episode, work on an irrigation canal in Haiti ceased because workers feared offending a rain god after some men had "disappeared into what was apparently solid ground". The problem was resolved when the program's hero showed the workers that quicksand — not a rain god — caused the disappearance.
