= Ben Maller =

American sports radio host (born 1975)

- Born: April 29, 1975 (age 51); Irvine, California
- Presenting career
- Show: The Ben Maller Show; The Blitz
- Station: Fox Sports Radio
- Country: United States
- Previous show: The Third Shift

Benjamin "Big Ben" Maller (born April 29, 1975) is an American sports radio host who hosts a weekday radio show on Fox Sports Radio, which airs 11pm-3am PT/2am-6am ET. Maller is considered one of the first influential sports bloggers, because of several stories he broke on his now-defunct website. Maller joined the NBC Sports Network as a regular contributor to NBC SportsTalk, late 2011 through spring 2012. He gained media attention during this time for losing 200 pounds in only 62 weeks, by changing his diet and exercise regimen.

== Early life ==
Maller grew up in Irvine, California and attended Irvine High School. Maller began to fall behind in school and consequently was placed in S.E.L.F. (Secondary Education Learning Facility, now known as Creekside High School), the city's alternative education program. Nonetheless, he managed to play high school football for the town's University High School while enrolled at S.E.L.F. Aside from playing football, Maller also had an interest in sports journalism and broadcasting. After finishing high school, Maller enrolled in Saddleback College in the nearby city of Mission Viejo. He continued his interest in sports broadcasting doing Saddleback College Gauchos men's basketball and football games on KSBR before landing a job as an AM sports radio journalist.

== Fox Sports Radio career ==
times are eastern

- 2000-2001: Weekend update sportsreader
- 2001-2009: Weekends 2 a.m. - 6 a.m.
- 2009-1/2015: Saturday/Sunday 1 a.m. - 6 a.m. (2012-2014: 1 a.m. - 7 a.m.)
- 2013-9/2014: Sunday 3 p.m. - 7 p.m.
- 9/2014-1/2015: Sunday 1 p.m. - 7 p.m.
- 1/2015: Weekdays 2 a.m. - 6 a.m.

== Notable events ==
During the 2011 Tōhoku earthquake and tsunami, Maller was able to get live reports from nearby the disaster, through a caller named Donald. Donald had attempted to call into the weeknight broadcaster, J. T. the Brick. Ultimately, J. T. the Brick decided not to put Donald on the airwaves. The next night, Donald called The Ben Maller Show and, thanks to producer Miranda Moreno, was put on the air right away and was able to provide live updates about the events in Fukushima.

In May 2010, Maller led a march at Staples Center with fellow Los Angeles Clippers fan Clipper Darrell in an unsuccessful attempt to help lead the push for free agent LeBron James to join the Clippers via free agency. In the end, LeBron James ended up signing with the Miami Heat as part of a historic team headlined by "The Big Three.'

In 2011, Ben Maller reported on an NBA slam dunk contest controversy. The league had sent out a press release referencing Clippers Blake Griffin as the winner before the contest had been completed.

Over the course of his career, Maller has had multiple menu items named after him in various restaurants around the United States. Former items include the "Malzone," in Syracuse, New York "Ben Maller Chicken Fingers in Kansas City, Missouri, and the "Maller Pizza," in Grand Rapids, Michigan

As of February 2017, the only existing menu items left are the "Maller Chicken Tender Sandwich" at the Sportsbook Bar and Grill in Denver, Colorado, "Ben Maller's Chicken Finger Basket" at The Landing Eatery & Pub in Liberty, Missouri and the "Maller Fowler" sandwich at The Famous Flamingo Club in Lawrence, Kansas.

In June 2016, one Cleveland fan celebrated the Cavs NBA championship by parading around the championship parade with a sign that included Ben Maller's photo with Skip Bayless, Stephen A. Smith and others as a "hater".

== Broadcasting career ==
His career highlights include reporting for XTRA Sports 690am in San Diego in the mid-1990s and co-hosting the Ben & Dave Show on XTRA Sports 1150 in LA (late-1990s) and Dodger Talk from 1996 to 2000. Maller joined Fox Sports Radio for the launch of the network in August 2001 as an update anchor weekend morning co-host.

In 2003, Maller signed a contract to become the "sports gossip guy," for Fox Sports, providing daily sports rumors and notes. Maller is credited with helping the website overtake ESPN.com in unique visitors for the first time, in February 2007.

On January 20, 2009, Maller and the Third Shift staff were fired as part of Clear Channel Communications' layoff of 1850 employees. He was re-hired August 11, 2009.

Maller became the first Southern California broadcaster to host a show on Boston's WEEI when he filled in for Mike Adams on "Planet Mikey," June 2009. On loan from Fox Sports Radio, he returned to Boston to audition for the third seat on the Kirk & Callahan morning show on WEEI, September 2016.

Maller joined NBC Sports Network November 2011 as a regular contributor to the daily "NBC SportsTalk" program.
