= The Third Shift =

American radio program

- Genre: Sports
- Running time: 4 hours
- Country of origin: United States
- Language(s): English
- Hosted by: Ben Maller; Karen Kay; Greg Bergman "The Amazing" Vladimir
- Created by: Fox Sports Radio
- Produced by: Greg Bergman
- Recording studio: Los Angeles
- Original release: 2004 – 2009
- Audio format: Stereophonic

The Third Shift was a daily radio program broadcast nationally on Fox Sports Radio (FSR) from 2:00–6:00 a.m. ET from 2004 up until January 20, 2009. The program was hosted by Ben Maller with co-host Karen Kay. Clear Channel Communications laid off seven percent of its workforce and thus the show was cancelled as the entire staff was laid off.

== Hosts ==
- Ben Maller: Host
- Karen Kay: Update anchor
- Greg Bergman: Producer, call screener
- "The Amazing" Vladimir

== Former hosts ==
- Jorge Sedano: Weekdays from 2004–2007
- Josh Gears "Lord of the Board": until 2008
- Chris Plank: Hosted from Tulsa, Oklahoma on weekends.

== Segments ==
=== Coach, Player, or Entertainer ===
Coach, Player, or Entertainer was a segment that intermittently over the course of the show. The game consists of Maller giving the name of a person; the caller then has to guess based on their knowledge coach, professional sports player, or actor/musician. The player received 10 points for guessing the correct category, and 5 bonus points for saying what team or television show/movie/band the person was in. The caller with the most points at the end of the timed segment won. This segment was later revived during Maller's current show that started on November 4, 2014.

=== Benny vs. The Penny ===
On Saturdays during the NFL season, Ben competed against a coin toss on picking the winners of each NFL game that would be played during the upcoming weekend. In 2006 Ben was outscored by the coin by almost 40 games. The segment was later moved online and was briefly available as a podcast before seeing revival during Maller's current show that started on November 4, 2014.

=== The Challenge Line ===
In the style of Jim Rome's "Smackoff," this was a game played between each was given two opportunities to square-off against the other person on a hot topic issue. In the first round, each caller got 30 seconds, one after the other. The crew briefly discussed it, and then the second round begun. The second round was the same format but instead the callers were given only 15 seconds. At the end of the second round the crew voted the winner, and took text or email votes from other callers and in the end declared a winner on-air

=== Password ===
Password was a smaller version of the hugely popular television game show, Password. Branded as "the word game of the stars" it was held every Friday on the show. Live callers were teamed-up with the celebrity hosts and asked to guess the password based upon one-word clues administered by the hosts of the show. The game play was also alternated between the two teams and at the end of the show a winner was declared based on the scoring and points system.

=== Sports Jeopardy ===
On Tuesday mornings, two callers competed in a sports themed contest similar to the game show Jeopardy!. The questions were usually written by one of the hosts and occasionally by a member of the audience. Karen Kay, Julio and a random caller on hold all acted as a life line for the contestants and were frequently utilized during the game. At the end of the game "Final Jeopardy' occurred where players could wager their imaginary dollars on whether or not they knew the answer to the question that was given to them. After this the game concluded and a winner was usually declared based on the caller's imaginary dollars, although in a few occasions, special circumstances would happen that changed the winner of the game.
