= Champion (spark plug) =

American brand of spark plug

- Company type: Automotive parts brand
- Founded: June 1905; 120 years ago in Boston, Massachusetts, US
- Founder: Albert Champion
- Products: Spark plugs
- Parent: Apollo Global Management
- Website: www.championautoparts.com

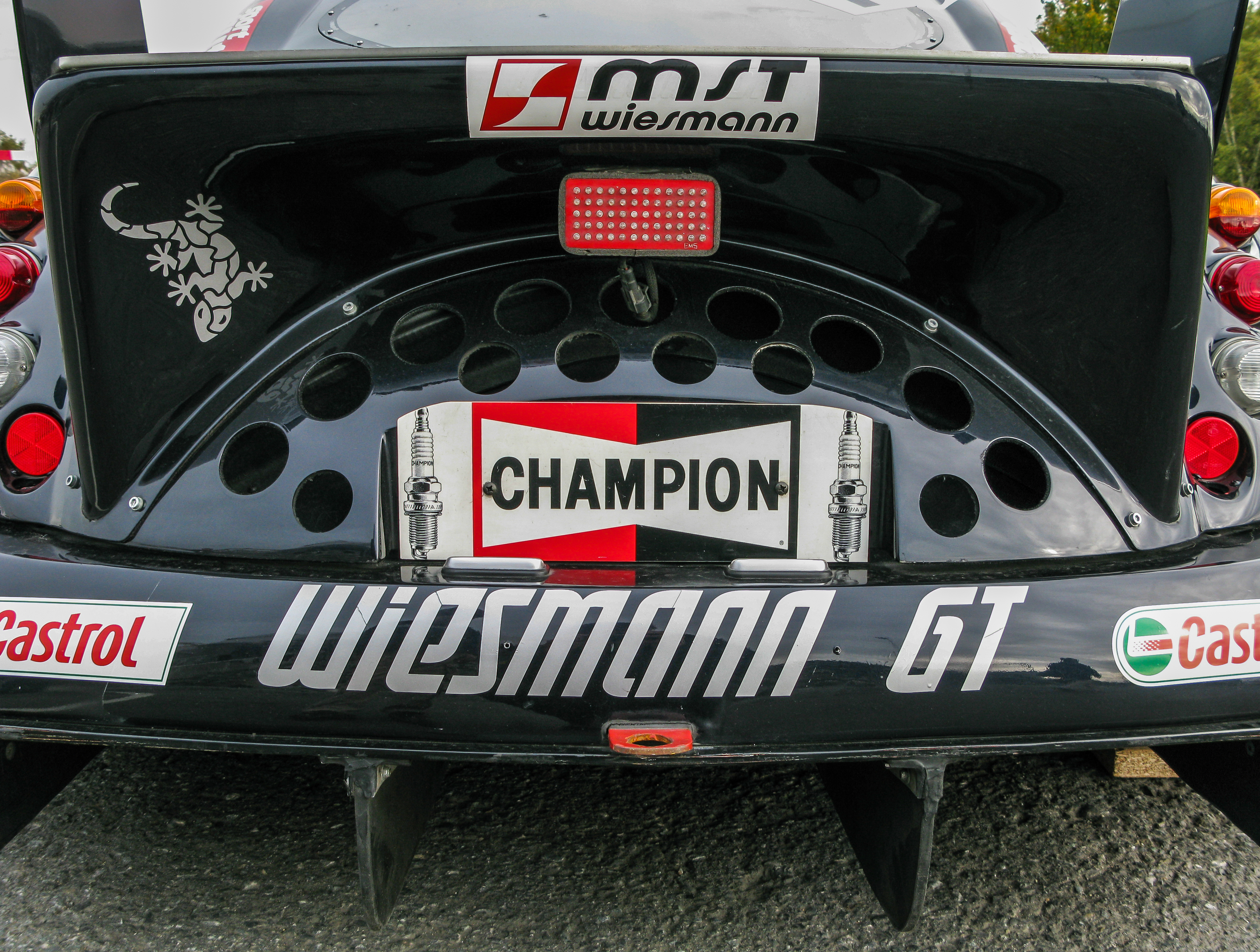
Champion logo on the back of a Wiesmann GT racing car

Champion is an American brand of spark plug for over 100 years. It is owned by Tenneco, which is owned by Apollo Global Management.

== History ==
=== Founding and early history ===
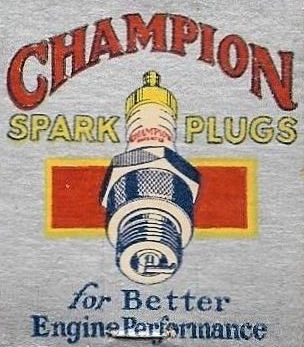
Champion spark plugs ad in 1947

Albert Champion Company was founded by Albert Champion in June 1905 in Boston's South End, in the landmark Cyclorama Building, to import French electrical parts, including Nieuport components. Champion presided as president of the Albert Champion Company with partners Frank D. Stranahan as treasurer and younger brother Spencer Stranahan as a clerk. By 1907, the Albert Champion Company was manufacturing porcelain spark plugs with the name Champion stamped on the side, Robert Stranahan, the youngest of the Stranahan brothers, finished his classes at Harvard, ahead of his class of 1908, and went to work in the stockroom.

Champion was not happy in his job because he had no control over his work. In 1908, he went to see William C. Durant of the Buick Motor Company. Durant asked to see some of his prototypes. Buick at that time was using Rajah spark plugs. Durant thought they could manufacture spark plugs to Champion's design cheaper than buying them from Rajah, and set Champion up in a workshop in Flint, Michigan.

In 1910, the company moved to Toledo, Ohio, to be close to the Willys-Overland Auto Company.

In 1931, Champion introduced its first suppressor-type spark plugs. It used a carbon-based resistor to reduce the effects of ignition noise on radio waves.

=== "Coso artifact" discovery ===
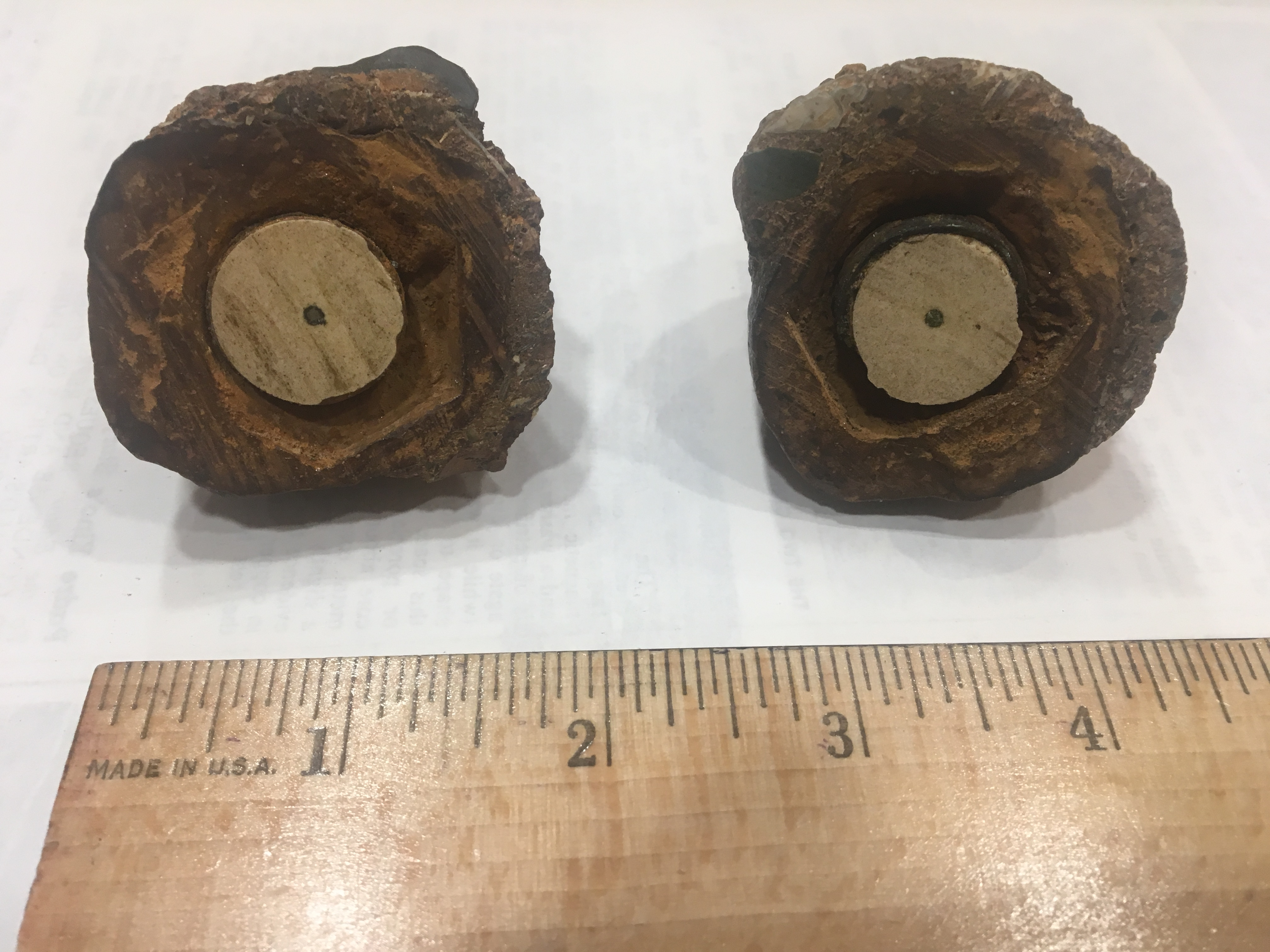
The Coso artifact

On February 13, 1961, two geode prospectors discovered a metal artifact encased in hard clay near the town of Olancha, California. The artifact was dubbed the "Coso artifact" due to alleged claims that there were fossils in the clay that were 500,000 years old, which would make the item an out-of-place artifact. The object turned out to be a Champion spark plug from the 1920s.

=== Following an acquisition by Cooper Industries ===
In 1989, Champion was purchased by Cooper Industries and then was a wholly owned brand of Federal-Mogul Corporation. Its main products are a line of spark plugs for a wide range of cars, trucks, SUVs, racing, and marine applications. Also included in the brand, depending on the regional market and brand history, are spark plug wires, wiper blades, batteries, oil filters, lighting, and glow plugs.

In April 2018, Tenneco announced that they had purchased Federal-Mogul in a deal worth approximately US$5.4 billion.

== Image gallery ==
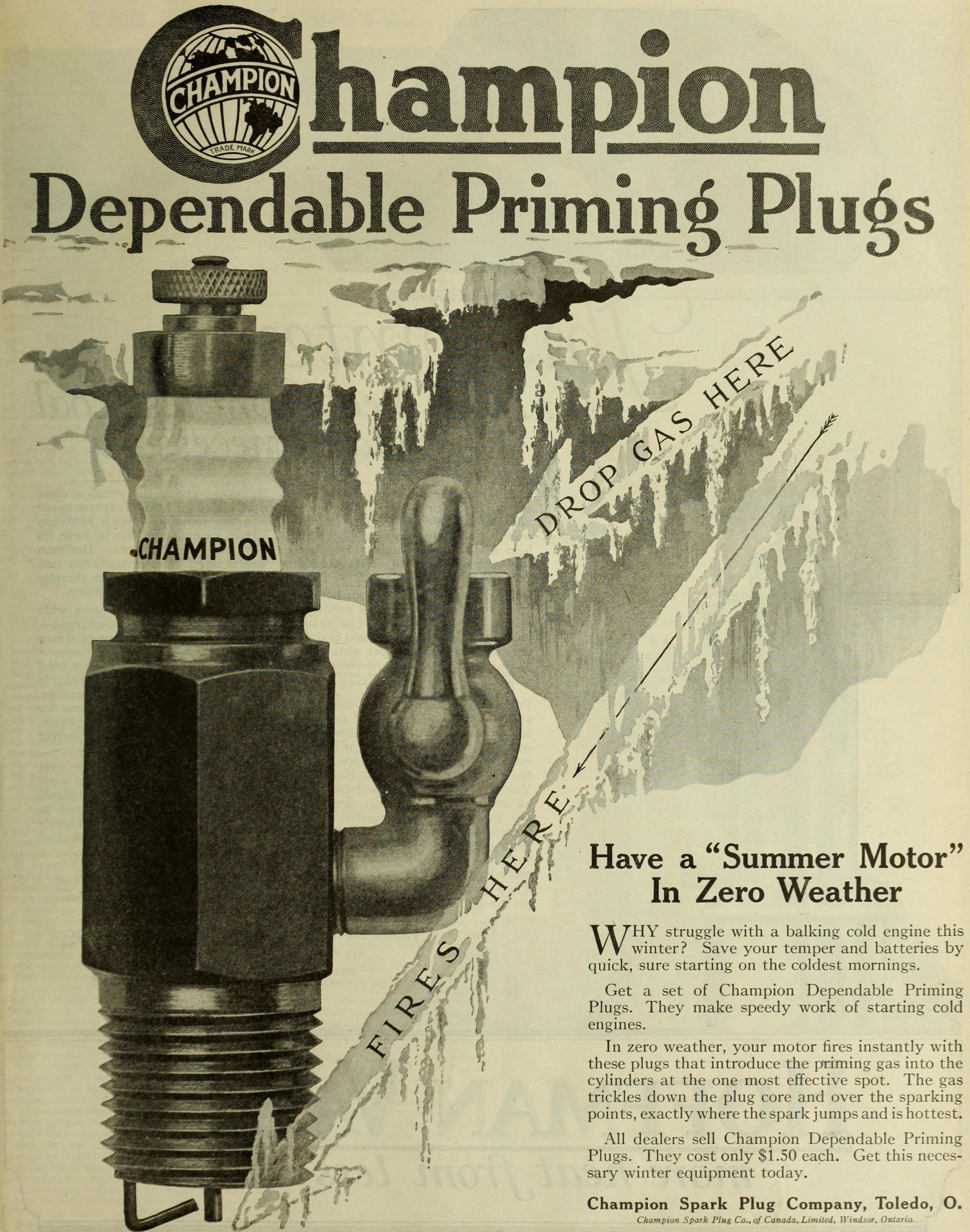
Champion spark plugs ad in The Saturday Evening Post, 1920

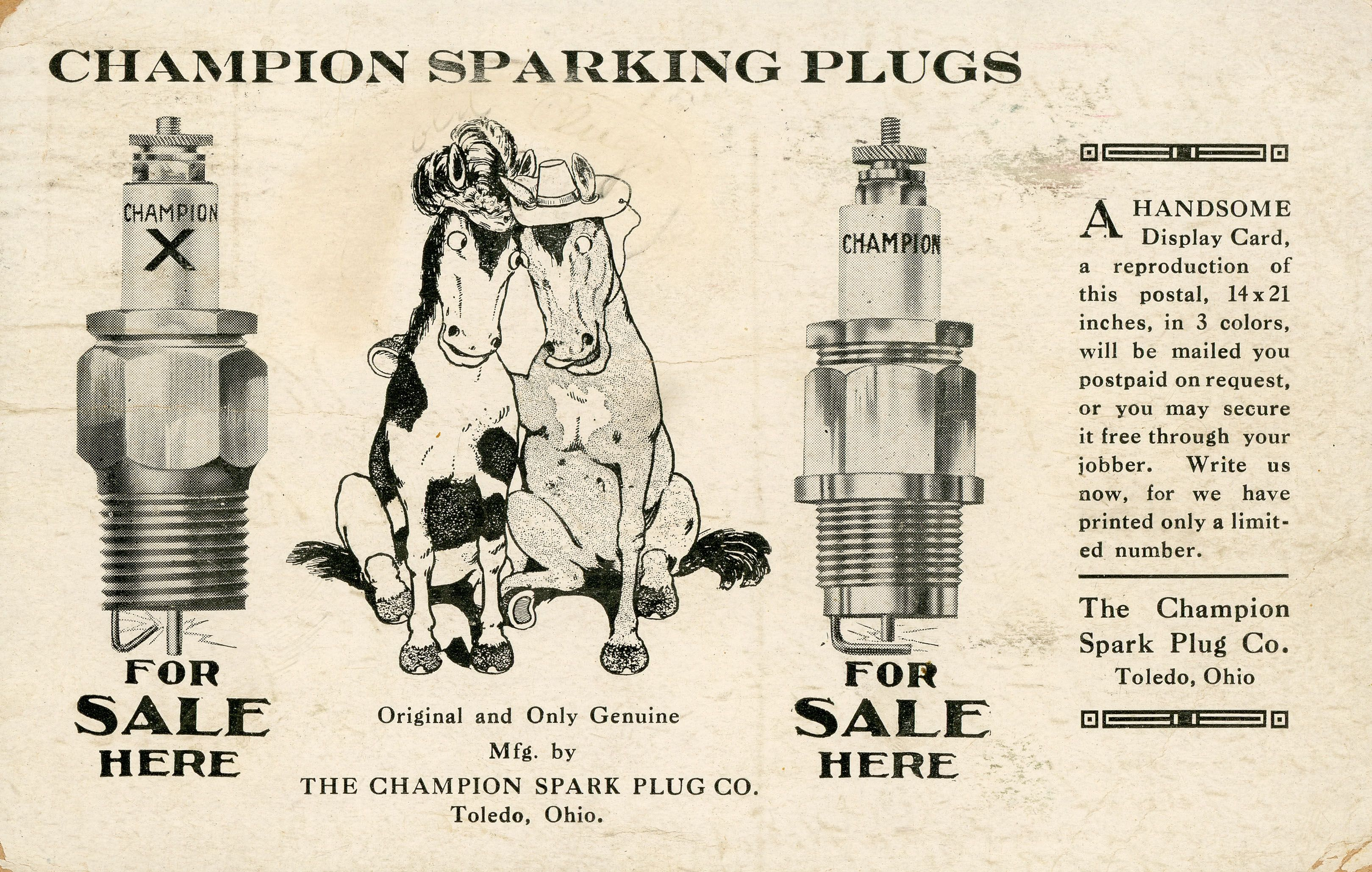
Champion Spark Plug Advertisement, 1914

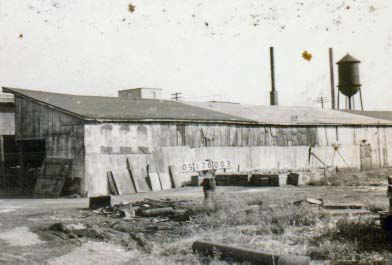
Champion Spark Plug Factory at 900 Upton Avenue, 1937

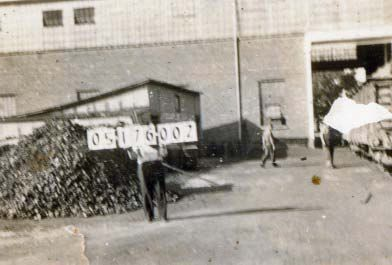
Champion Spark Plug Factory at 900 Upton Avenue, 1937

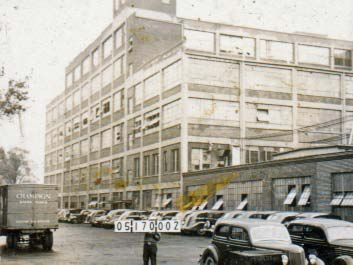
Champion Spark Plug Factory at 900 Upton Avenue, 1937

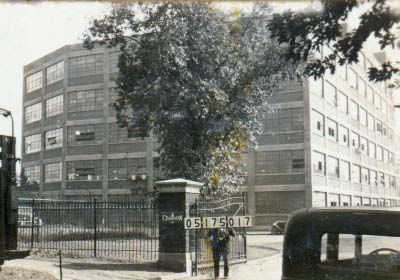
Champion Spark Plug Factory at 900 Upton Avenue, 1937

== In popular culture ==
A character, Cliff Booth, portrayed by Brad Pitt in Quentin Tarantino's 2019 film Once Upon a Time in Hollywood wore a Champion shirt, briefly causing it to become a fashion statement in 2019.

== See also ==
- Champion Spark Plug Hour
