= Coso artifact =

Spark plug supposedly encased in a 500,000-year-old geode

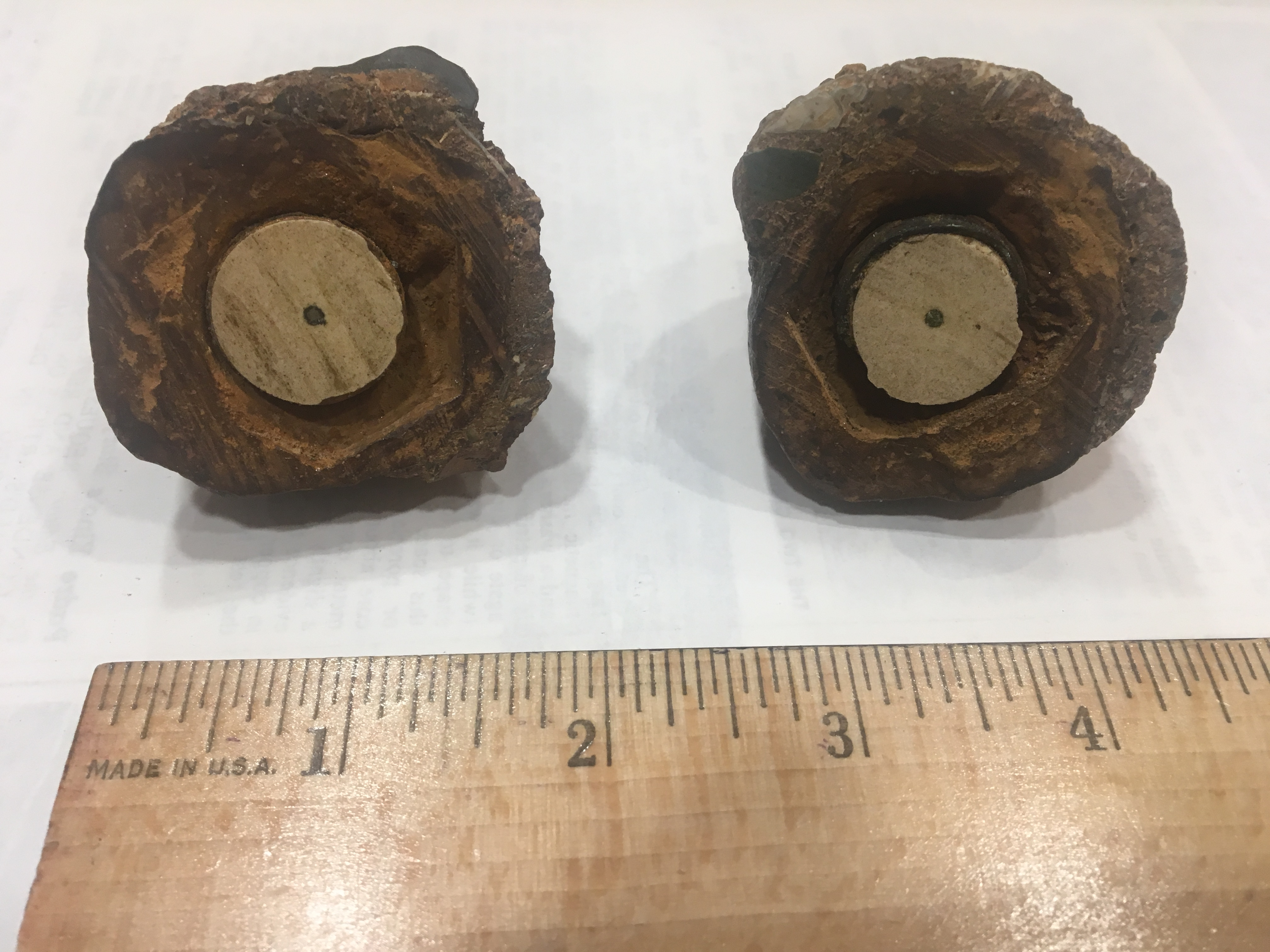
Coso artifact in 2018

The Coso artifact is an object falsely claimed by its discoverers to be a spark plug encased in a geode. Discovered on February 13, 1961, by Wallace Lane, Virginia Maxey, and Mike Mikesell while they were prospecting for geodes near the town of Olancha, California, it has long been claimed as an example of an out-of-place artifact. The artifact has been identified as a 1920s-era Champion spark plug encased in a concretion.

A spark plug encased in a 500,000-year-old "geode" would represent a substantial scientific and historical anomaly, as spark plugs were invented in the 19th century. The stone matrix containing the artifact is not a geode but a concretion that can be explained by natural processes that can take place over decades or years, not millennia.

== Discovery ==
Following its collection, Mikesell destroyed a diamond-edged blade by cutting through the matrix and discovered the item. The item was described as a porcelain cylinder with a two-millimeter shaft of bright metal, and later tests revealed the shaft to be magnetic. In a letter to Desert Magazine of Outdoor Southwest, a reader stated that a trained geologist had dated the nodule as at least 500,000 years old. The identity of the geologist and the means of dating were never clarified, nor were the findings ever published in any known periodical. Furthermore, there was no method for dating the concretion at the time of the artifact's reported discovery. There are examples of accretions surrounding iron or steel artifacts, some of them discussed by J. M. Cronyn.

== Criticism and analysis ==
There are several pseudoscientific theories for the artifact's origin, among them:

- An ancient advanced civilization (such as Atlantis);
- Prehistoric ancient astronauts;
- Human time travelers from the future leaving or losing the artifact during a visit to the past.

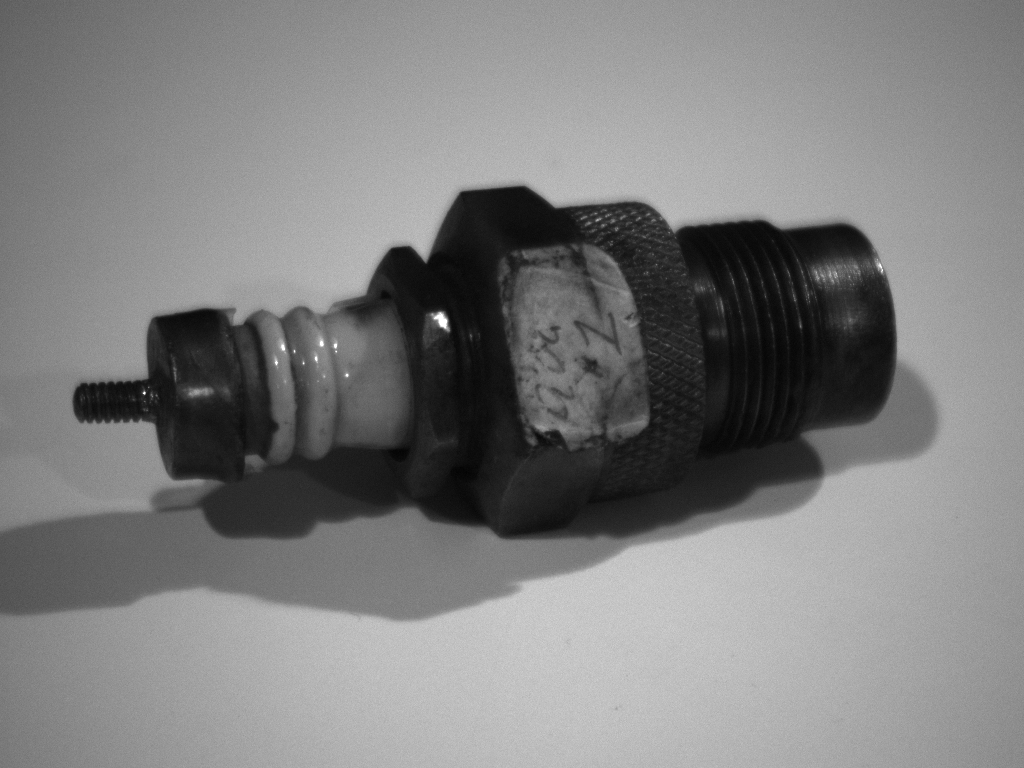
An example of a 1920s Champion spark plug

An investigation by Pierre Stromberg and Paul Heinrich, using x-rays taken of the object, with the help of members of the Spark Plug Collectors of America, identified the artifact as a 1920s-era Champion spark plug, widely used in the Ford Model T and Model A engines. SPCOA President Chad Windham and other collectors concurred with their assessment.

Stromberg and Heinrich's report indicates that the spark plug became encased in a concretion composed of iron derived from the rusting spark plug. Iron and steel artifacts rapidly form iron-oxide concretions as they rust in the ground.

On April 12, 2018, Stromberg was contacted by the family of one of the co-discoverers of the artifact. Offered an opportunity to inspect the artifact physically, Stromberg accepted and also arranged for the artifact to be inspected by a geologist from the University of Washington Earth and Space Science department. The inspections confirmed the previous conclusion that the artifact was a 1920s-era Champion spark plug.

It had been claimed to have fossil shells on the surfaces "that dated back 500,000 years", but the University of Washington geologist could find no evidence of this claim. This raises the question of "the qualifications and competency of the original alleged geologist … in 1961". The reason the artifact gained the fame that it did was because of the shell claim. As of 2019, the artifact resides at the Pacific Science Center in Seattle, where it is shown in an exhibition called "What Is Reality?"

== See also ==
- London Hammer
