= Fox Sports Radio =

American sports radio network

- Type: Sports radio
- Country: United States

Ownership
- Parent: Fox Sports (content); Premiere Networks (distribution)

Links
- Webcast: Listen Live
- Website: foxsportsradio.iheart.com

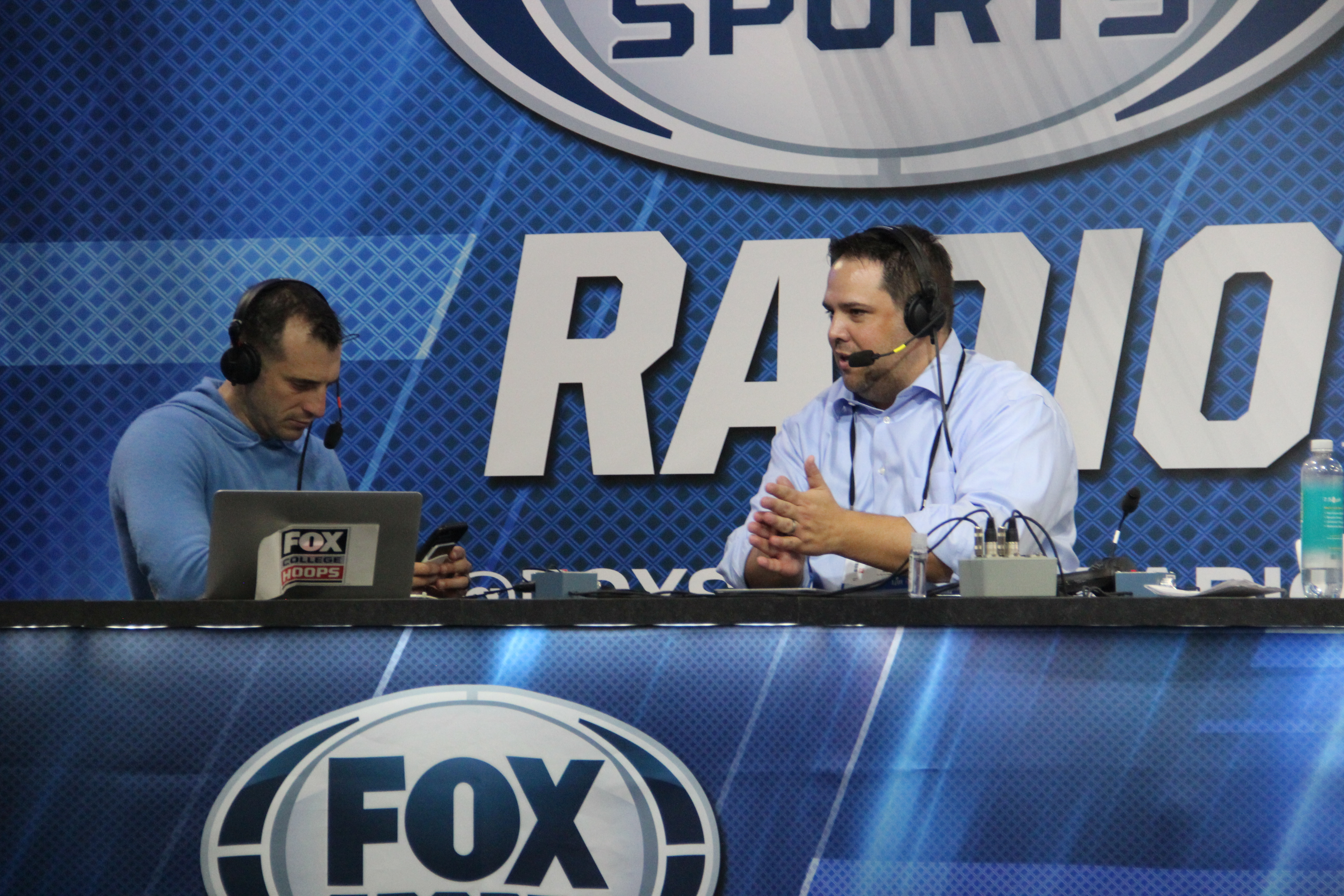
A Fox Sports Radio broadcast on Radio Row at Super Bowl LIII

Fox Sports Radio is an American sports radio network. Based in Los Angeles, California, the network is operated and managed by Premiere Networks in a content partnership with Fox Corporation's Fox Sports division and iHeartMedia, parent company of Premiere Networks. With studios also in New York, Chicago, Philadelphia, Tampa, Phoenix, Tulsa, Cincinnati, and Las Vegas, Fox Sports Radio is broadcast on more than 400 stations, as well as FoxSports.com on MSN and iHeartRadio.

Clear Channel Communications (now iHeartMedia) sold its stake in SiriusXM Radio in the second quarter of fiscal year 2013. As a result, nine of Clear Channel's eleven XM Satellite Radio stations, including Fox Sports Radio, ceased broadcast over XM on October 18, 2013. Fox Sports Radio returned to the Sirius XM radio lineup on January 20, 2017. The Sirius XM feed contains some live sporting events not carried by the over-the-air network, including the United Football League and World Cup matches.

As the network concentrates on sports news, highlights, analysis and opinion at any time of the week, many of its affiliates opt out to air their own local show or provide play-by-play coverage of live games. As a result, several shows that these affiliates simulcast may not be full-length.

== Weekday lineup ==
- 6am-9am ET: Two Pros and a Cup of Joe hosted by Lavar Arrington, Jonas Knox and Brady Quinn
- 9am-12pm ET: The Dan Patrick Show hosted by Dan Patrick with The Danettes
- 12pm-3pm ET: The Herd with Colin Cowherd hosted by Colin Cowherd with Jason McIntyre
- 3pm-5pm ET: Stugotz and Company hosted by Jon "Stugotz" Weiner
- 5pm-7pm ET: Covino and Rich hosted by Steve Covino and Rich Davis
- 7pm-10pm ET: The Odd Couple with Rob Parker and Kelvin Washington hosted by Rob Parker and Kelvin Washington
- 10pm-2am ET: The Jason Smith Show with Mike Harmon hosted by Jason Smith and Mike Harmon
- 2am-6am ET: The Ben Maller Show hosted by Ben Maller
