= Total Axxess =

Total Axxess was a contemporary Christian music radio program. The afternoon show was broadcast nationwide on WAY-FM Network and other affiliated Contemporary Christian music radio stations. The program was based out of Nashville, Tennessee. The show was produced by CHRSN. The show began in January 2004, and ended in September 2011.

== Cliff era ==
Cliff Tredway was the original host of Total Axxess.

== Jayar era ==
Jayar Reeves hosted the show for two years.

=== Features ===
- Total Axxess Hotlist - daily Top 5 songs countdown
- Bowling for Plugs - an artist was shot down a "bowling alley", to determine the length of time that they would get to "plug" whatever they want
- Cellphone Superstar - a radio version of American Idol where contestants sang via cell phone
- Five Seconds of Fame - callers had five seconds to give a shout out to whomever
- On Tour with ____ - Jayar joined an artist for a portion of their tour

=== The Golden Duckie Awards ===
The show hosted its second annual Duckie Awards in April 2007. Listeners voted for their favorite artists in ten categories such as Best Chica (female artist), Best Dude, Best Accent, and Favorite Moment.

== Wally era ==
Wally became the new host for the show on April 30, 2007. According to the program's official website, there were radio stations in 25 states in over 100 markets when he took over.

Wally was the last host of Total Axxess. In 2011 he became the host of the WAY-FM morning show, The Wally Show.

=== Past Show Members ===
- Wally - Host and DJ
- Zach - Producer and co-host
- Stacey - Assistant Producer
- Betty Rock - Full-timer
- Bekah - Full-timer
- Rebie - Part-timer
- Richard - Intern
- Erika - Intern
- Heather - Intern
- Fluffy - Intern
- Ryan - Intern
- Jerry - Intern
- O'fer - Intern. Also known as Katie Rose from the morning show.

=== Show Segments ===
- Wally's Island - each day, a listener created short story about their time on a deserted island is read, with the titles of 3 songs being worked in.
- Who in the Band... - band members answer Wally's questions about the band
- Journal Song - Artists in studio sing songs from Wally's 6th Grade Journal set to the tune of one of their popular songs
- Paper or Plastic - Wally gives artists a choice between two things, and the artist picks one. An ice-breaking game.
- Walter Picks The Hits - Hosted by a guy named Walter who lives in Montgomery, Alabama, and picks songs from new releases that he thinks will become a hit.
- Newsbomb - A short news segment on current events.
- Are You Smarter Than a Rock - Caller goes against Betty Rock in a trivia contest. If Betty wins 10 of these contests this year, she will receive a full-ride scholarship to Grand Canyon University.
- Yesterday's News - A caller goes against Betty Rock in a current events quiz.
- Is Stacy Crazy? - Stacy gives three statements, and a caller must determine if each one is true or false.
- Zach's Blog Report - Producer Zach gives a report on bands based on information from their blogs.
- You Twit - A report from band's Twitter accounts.
- Seemingly Impossible Trivia that Apparently Isn't - A trivia question in which three callers in a row must get the question right in order to win.
- One More - Callers must try guess the top answer in a top ten list. However, a caller can still win with a lower answer than number 1 as long as another caller does not guess an answer higher on the list.
- Dear Jon - Blogger and author Jon Acuff answers questions about the lighter side of Christianity.

=== Past Segments ===
- The Circle Bunny Song - the artist being interviewed sings their own rendition of the lullaby that Wally wrote for his daughter.
- Is Ryan Lyin'? - Same rules as Is Stacy Crazy? Changed to Stacy when Ryan left the show.
- Will It Hold Intern Fluffy? - An intern would stand on an object to see if it would break. A caller would try to guess whether or not the object would hold.
- Total Axxess Hot List - Similar to Wally's Island, listeners would go to the show's website and make a list of their five favorite songs. One of the lists would be picked and played on the show.
