= The CEO Show with Robert Reiss =

The CEO Show with Robert Reiss is a national US 19-minute interview format radio program in which Robert Reiss interviews Chief Executive Officers (CEOs) of companies. The purpose of the show is to share business practices.

== History ==
The program was first shown in Greenwich, Connecticut from WGCH AM radio in April 2007, and expanded to a national format in September of the same year. The CEO Show is broadcast nationally out of 40 cities including Atlanta, Boston, Chicago, Houston, the New York Metropolitan area, Las Vegas and, San Diego BTRN and LTRN networks (Business Talk Radio Network and Lifestyle Talk Radio Network). Interview podcasts are available online at The CEO Show Online website.

In March 2011, The CEO Show expanded to The CEO Show Minute, a 1-minute 30 second 'best of' show transmitted over 3000 times a week. The CEO Show is expanded in Reiss' monthly column with Forbes.com. The CEO Show also publishes The CEO Forum, a quarterly magazine with ten CEO interviews per quarter. Reiss also produces The CEO TV Showin a pan-Internet/mobile telephone format, where Reiss interviews the CEOs considered most innovative.

== Cast ==
Reiss is chairman of The Conference Board's Senior Marketing Executive Conference, which was ranked fourth C-Suite venue globally in Weber Shandwick's annual evaluation for 2009.

Robert G. Reiss was cited in The Harvard Business Review as "an expert in executive communications”. He is also president of Reissource LLC, a consultancy on customer service strategy.

== Interviews ==
Executives interviewed on The CEO Show include:

Business services

- James H. Quigley, CEO, Deloitte
- Bruce Mosler, CEO, Cushman & Wakefield

Travel

- Simon F. Cooper, President, The Ritz-Carlton Hotel Company, LLC
- David Neeleman, Founder and CEO, Jet Blue

Publishing and media

- Cathie Black, President, Hearst Magazines
- Tim & Nina Zagat, Co-Founders & Co-Chairs, Zagat Survey

Online

- Tony Hsieh, CEO, Zappos.com
- Jay Walker, Founder, Priceline.com

Consumer products and services

- William P. Lauder, CEO, The Estee Lauder Companies
- Leon Gorman, Chairman & 33-Year President, L.L. Bean
- Larry Janesky, CEO, Basement Systems Inc.

Music and entertainment

- Reynold Levy, President, Lincoln Center for the Performing Arts
- Gary Loveman, CEO, Harrah's Entertainment

Non-profit

- David A. Williams, CEO, Make a Wish Foundation
- Edward T. Reilly, CEO, American Management Association

Retail

- Kip Tindell, Chairman and CEO, The Container Store
- W. Howard Lester, 22-Year CEO and Chairman, Williams-Sonoma, Inc.

Healthcare

- Patrick Charmel, President and CEO Griffin Hospital
