= This Changing World =

American radio soap opera series (1944–1945)

This Changing World is an American radio soap opera that debuted on CBS on July 3, 1944 and ended in January 1945. The program focused on how American women had to adjust to changes in their lives while their husbands were in the military during World War II.

== Premise ==
Episodes centered on Neil Bishop, a U. S. Army private first class, and his wife, Martha. Flashbacks provided contrast between their experiences before the war and the "emotional, spiritual, and intellectual conflicts as a result of the war." Other characters on the show included Randolph Henderson, Martha's boss, and Mrs. Henderson, his "solicitous mother".

== Cast ==
- Martha Bishop - Frances Carlon
- Neil Bishop - Lawson Zerbe
- Randolph Henderson - John Archer
- Mrs. Henderson - Vera Allen

== Production ==
This Changing World was the first daytime radio program that was created with the use of "careful psychological research and analysis". Olga Druce, who had training in psychiatry and psychoanalysis, developed the characters' personalities based on "the conditioning forces and motivating factors" that affected them. The actors received a thorough background about what made their characters who they were. Jay Clark was the director; Ted and Mat Ferro were the writers.

This Changing World was sponsored by Chase & Sanborn Coffee and Royal Desserts and was broadcast at 10:30 a.m. Eastern Time. This Changing World replaced The Open Door; it was replaced by The Strange Romance of Evelyn Winters.

== Contest ==
A contest put on by the program's sponsors offered listeners an opportunity to win one of five prizes — from $5 in war stamps to a $100 war bond. Each entrant had to tell in 300 words or less how the war had changed his or her world, and the entry had to mention one character in the show.
