= Cafe Nashville =

Café Nashville Radio Show is a syndicated radio program owned and operated by OnAir Broadcasting, INC.

== Host of Café Nashville ==
Café Nashville is hosted by Jody Van-Alin and Jodi Brook.

Café Nashville is produced by Ruby Cortez.

Cafe Nashville assistant producer is Sydney Sullivan.

The show engineer is Brandon Kaly.

== History ==
Café Nashville launched in March 2008 on WKDF in Nashville, Tennessee.

On April 1, 2013, Café Nashville launched a night-time show. The first affiliate was KAWO in Boise Idaho.

== Affiliates ==
=== Current affiliates ===
WTGE - Baton Rouge, Louisiana KAWO - Boise, Idaho WUSJ - Jackson, MS WBQQ - Kennebunk Port, ME WTHT - Portland, ME KUPL - Portland, OR WBYA - Augusta, ME WNHW - Belmont/Concord Lakes, NH WXLF - Hartford, VT/ Lebanon, NH WCBL - Benton, KY WKXD - Cookville, TN

CMR Nashville - London, England
