= The Woolworth Hour =

American radio musical series (1955–1957)

The Woolworth Hour is an American radio program of concert music that was broadcast on CBS from June 5, 1955, until December 29, 1957. Beginning on September 4, 1955, it was also carried on 47 stations on the Dominion Network in Canada.

== Overview ==
Episodes of The Woolworth Hour were "designed to appeal to a broad popular taste" including "lush string arrangements of old standards and some new hits plus a touch of the classical." Bruno Zirato Jr., the director, said that listeners "turn to us for standard music that they seldom find elsewhere on the air." Conductor Percy Faith summed up his view of the show: "I like to picture a romantic young couple hearing the program on a car radio — or a family sitting around after Sunday dinner — or a husband and wife, who have had many years together, hearing a song from their courtship. We try to have something for everyone."

Faith led a 36-piece orchestra and a chorus on the program. When he took a two-month vacation in the summer of 1956, substitute conductors were Johnny Green, David Rose, Paul Weston, and Victor Young. Episodes usually featured four or five guest stars. Guest performers on the program included Cab Calloway, Stan Freeman, Dizzy Gillespie, Dorothy Kirsten, Nadine Conner, Robert Merrill, Margaret Whiting, Frankie Laine, Burl Ives, Duke Ellington, Lois Hunt, Vaughan Monroe, Earl Wrightson, Jerry Vale, Ferlin Husky, Della Reese, Rosemary Clooney, Ann Miller, Billy Daniels, Dolores Hawkins, Ella Fitzgerald, Nat King Cole, Jerome Hines, Gisele MacKenzie, Tony Bennett, and Jan Peerce. Guests were sometimes new to radio, as when Metropolitan Opera soprano Heidi Krall performed an aria from Tosca and a hymn by Franz Schubert, which the trade publication Variety called "a rewarding occasion for the listener."

Donald Woods was the program's host, and Jack Brand was the announcer. Jane Stewart was "Woolworth's shopping reporter", focusing on "specific items of interest to the housewife the working woman, and the teen-age girl."

The September 23, 1956, episode focused exclusively on George Gershwin in observance of the 100th anniversary of his birth. Carmen McRae and Earl Wrightson were the guests who sang Gershwin's music. Guests who talked about aspects of Gershwin's life included Paul Whiteman, and Ira Gershwin.

The program was sponsored by the F. W. Woolworth Company, the "first continuous, full-scale national advertising" for that company, at a cost of $16,000 per week. When plans for the show were announced, The New York Times reported, "The Woolworth-C. B. S. deal has aroused unusual interest in the radio industry. It comes at a time when the sale of a one-hour program to a single sponsor is rare." The trend at the time was for networks to sell partial sponsorships of radio programs to participating sponsors. The trade publication Broadcasting saluted the announcement with an editorial that said, in part, "It was a significant decision, not only because Woolworth is itself big, but because the signing also marks the company's entry into network radio. What the dime store chain was saying by its signing for the series was that 'we are now convinced that network radio is a good, solid advertising buy.'"

== Production ==
Paul Roberts was the producer, and Charles S. Monroe was the writer. The one-hour program was broadcast on Sundays at 1 p.m. Eastern Time.

An article in The New York Times in 1956 described Mary Bentley Baker as "the guiding force behind The Woolworth Hour". Bentley was the vice president of the agency that handled advertising for Woolworth and the only woman involved in planning advertising for the company.

Macdonald Carey was originally slated to be the host of the program, but in May 1955 he withdrew from that role to pursue an opportunity to be on a television series.

== Critical response ==
Jack Gould wrote in a review in The New York Times that The Woolworth Hour "represents almost an innovation — and a most heartening one — for contemporary radio" as a new, live musical program on network radio. Gould commented on the advantages of broadcasting live, rather than recorded, music, saying of the premiere episode, "On Sunday afternoon the ear could sense that elusive sparkle and feeling of actuality that are the stamp of the performance that takes place as you hear it."

Jim Cox, in his book Musicmakers of Network Radio: 24 Entertainers, 1926-1962, called The Woolworth Hour "one of the spectacular musical delicacies still available to listeners" and "one of the few features of its class to remain on coast-to-coast radio that late in the ethereal day."

A review of the premiere episode in Variety described the show as "wholesomely flavored with an abundance of tunes. It's a rhythmic stanza, geared to a wide variety of tastes". It commended Woods's work as host and said that the orchestra did "an okay job on the instrumentalization." The reviewer most disliked the "annoying" frequency of commercials. A follow-up review in Variety two months later said that The Woolworth Hour "passes quickly and pleasantly — a worthy hour on the Sunday afternoon kilocycles." The review contrasted the show's relaxed pace with that of NBC's weekend Monitor program "with its breathless, show biz-in-a-hurry premise", saying that the Woolworth show "has much to commend it".

== Recognition ==
Recognition by the Composers Guild of America in cooperation with Down Beat magazine designated Faith for having created the best original scoring for a regularly scheduled radio series. Participants in TV Radio Mirror magazine's ninth annual awards polling (1955–56) named the show Favorite Radio Musical Program.
