= The House of Mystery (radio series) =

American radio dramatic mystery anthology series (1945–1949)

The House of Mystery is an American radio dramatic mystery anthology that was broadcast on Mutual from January 15, 1945, until December 25, 1949.

== Format ==
John Griggs portrayed Roger Elliott, the host and narrator. Elliott, a ghost chaser and "scientist of the supernatural", sought to disprove the existence of phantoms and ghosts. Episodes of The House of Mystery used a storytelling scenario. Elliott related tales to a group of children and offered them an opportunity to ask questions at the end of his story. His tales included "mysterious lights, footprints that vanished before the eyes, and things that went bump in the night." Episodes were based "on a foundation of strong stories and scientific accuracy."

== Episodes ==
The November 7, 1948, episode was "The Mystery of the Empty Chair".

== Production ==
Bob Maxwell created The House of Mystery after Dr. Robert Thorndyke of Columbia University conducted a survey that indicated that boys and girls over a wide range of ages "preferred supernatural mystery to any other format". Frances Dexter produced the program, and Olga Druce directed it. The program's mood was established at the beginning of each episode with "creepy organ music and the salutation Thisssss is the Houssssse ... of Mysssstery!" George Wright played the organ.

From January 15, 1945, through May 11, 1945, the program was 15 minutes long and was broadcast Monday-Friday. It was taken off the air to accommodate the move of Captain Midnight from ABC to Mutual. The House of Mystery returned on September 15, 1946, as a 30-minute program on Saturdays at noon, Eastern Time with General Foods as sponsor, promoting Post-Toasties cereal. It ended in that time slot on June 1, 1946, and returned to the air on Sundays at 4 p.m. E. T. from October 6, 1946, through December 25, 1949, with General Foods continuing as sponsor.

== Critical response ==
A review in Radio Best magazine said, "Writer-producer-director Olga Druce puts most other popular shows to shame by the subtle and realistic way in which she handles drama." The review commended the use of commercials at the beginning and end of each episode, with no interruption in the middle. The conclusion was "It all adds up to top- drawer entertainment for the kids and their elders, too. Definitely not to be missed."

== Effects on children ==
Some individuals and organizations were concerned about possible negative effects that programs like The House of Mystery might have on children. Druce acknowledged that such shows could frighten children initially. She said, "We ask the parents to cooperate and sit with the children for about five programs explaining such things as the announcer pitching his voice low to create a mysterious atmosphere. Soon the child will lose all fear and enjoy the drama." In that way, she said, children would "learn to overcome fear through reasoning and enlightenment." She noted that each episode demonstrated that "a logical solution to the supernatural" existed. Druce also pointed out that some people who objected to mystery programs had condemned them without ever listening to them.

== Recognition ==
In 1946, the Ohio State Institute for Education by Radio recognized The House of Mystery with one of 13 awards presented to national network radio programs. During the organization's 10th annual American exhibition, the show received a first for children's programming. The citation accompanying the award said, "This program merits the award because it achieves the objectives essential in a program for children. First and foremost, it entertains; second, it is good radio drama; third, the suspense is resolved within the program, and fourth, it shows that superstition and fear are based on ignorance."

== Television ==
A pilot for a TV version of The House of Mystery was made in 1954, but it was never broadcast. Dan O'Herlihy portrayed Elliott, and Maxwell was the producer.
