= This Is Hell! =

This is Hell!
- Genre: News, interview
- Running time: 240 min
- Country of origin: USA
- Language: English
- Home station: WNUR-FM
- Hosted by: Chuck Mertz
- Original release: 1996 – present
- Website: thisishell.com
- Podcast: podcast feed

This is Hell! is a weekly Saturday morning four hour radio show hosted by Chuck Mertz on WNUR-FM in Chicago, Illinois. It has been broadcasting regularly since 1996. In addition to the live broadcast the show provides a podcast with archives going back to 2001.

== Format ==
Each show consists of four or five long interviews with academics, authors, or activists. Each interview ends with the question from hell; "a question we hate to ask, you may hate to answer, or our audience may hate the response".

Other features include pieces by a range of irregular correspondents from around the world, the most frequent being playwright and screenwriter Jeff Dorchen, whose Moment of Truth closes the show, and less frequently Kevan Harris The Radical Pessimist, and Elvis deMorrow from the Konspiracy Korner. URL Labs' LaddieO.com regularly delivers a Website of the Week. The guests and irregular correspondents are interspersed with local, national and international information and news stories, as well as informed commentary on a range of subjects.

The show also typically includes a segment about hangover cures, both dubious and credible, and an ad for National Beer which culminates in the host deciphering a rebus puzzle.

== Guests ==
Notable guests have included Dan Ellsberg, G. Flint Taylor, Sami Al-Arian, Scott Ritter, Noam Chomsky, Greg Palast, Juan Cole, Naomi Klein, Christopher Hitchens, Ray McGovern, Alexander Cockburn, Thomas Frank, Dean Baker, Glenn Greenwald, Bill McKibben, Stephen Walt, Rami Khouri, James Galbraith, Barbara Ehrenreich, Immanuel Wallerstein, Dahr Jamail, Paul Craig Roberts, Andrew Bacevich, Chris Hedges, John Mearsheimer, Deepak Tripathi and Seymour Hersh, many of whom have been on the show multiple times.
