= The Ed Sullivan Show (radio program) =

American old-time radio program

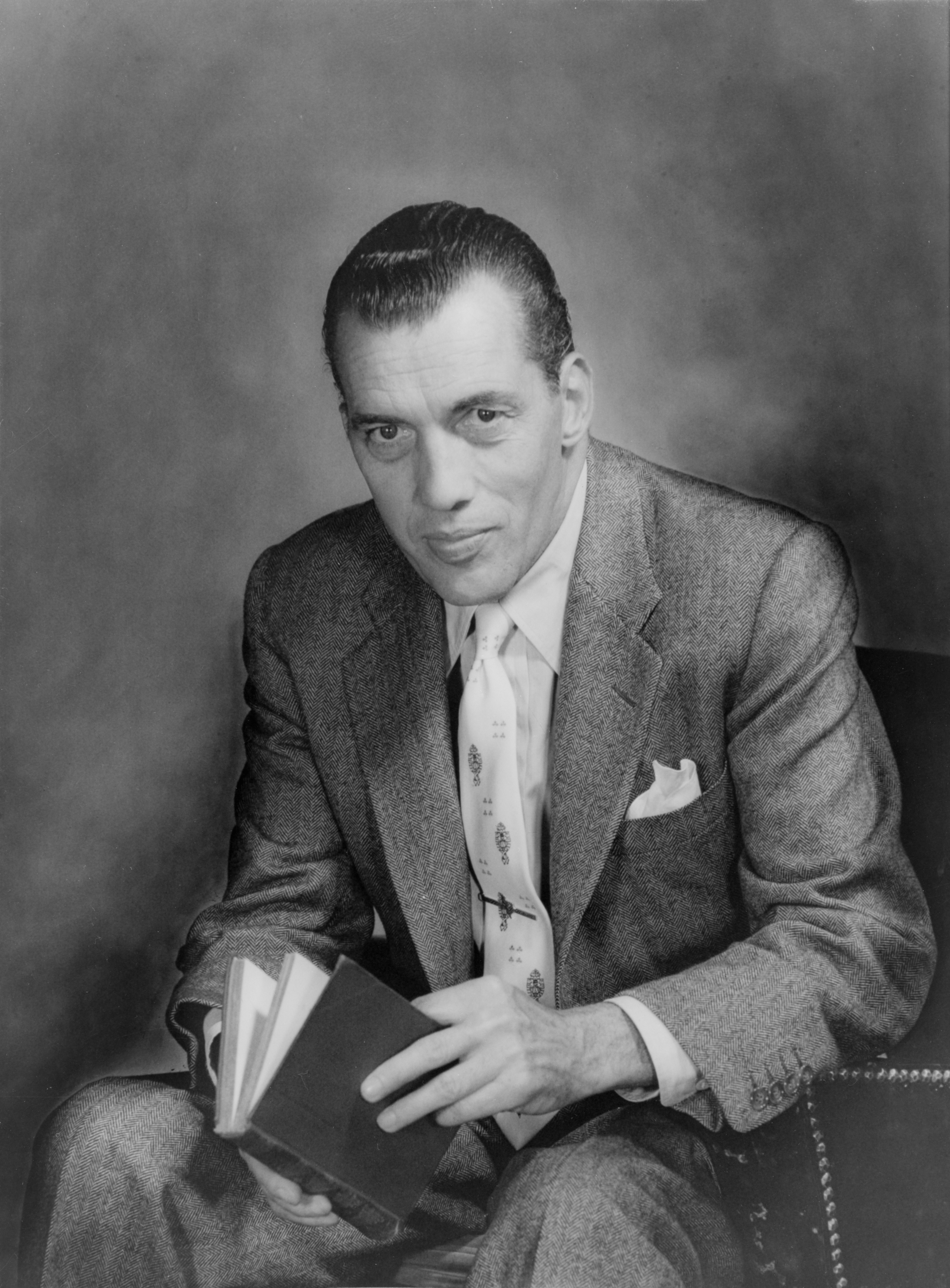
- Ed Sullivan in 1955
- Other names: Ed Sullivan Variety; Ed Sullivan Entertains; Ed Sullivan's Pipelines
- Running time: 15 minutes 30 minutes
- Country of origin: United States
- Language(s): English
- Home station: WABC (1932)
- TV adaptations: The Ed Sullivan Show
- Hosted by: Ed Sullivan
- Announcer: David Ross; Harry von Zell
- Original release: January 12, 1932 – September 30, 1946

The Ed Sullivan Show is an American old-time radio program. More precisely, it is a name that can be applied to any of four programs that were broadcast in 1932, 1941, 1943–1944, and 1946. The first three were on CBS, and the last was on the Blue Network. As the title implies, the host of the program was Ed Sullivan, who was then known for his work as a columnist for the New York Daily News.

== 1932 ==
Sullivan's first program, described as "a series of gossipy talk-and-interview shows", was known for introducing people to the radio audience. Among those making their radio debuts on this 15-minute program were Jack Benny, Irving Berlin, George M. Cohan, Jack Pearl, and Florenz Ziegfeld. The show was first broadcast on CBS on January 12, 1932, and it ended on August 18, 1932.

== 1941 (Ed Sullivan Variety) ==
Ed Sullivan Variety began on CBS on April 27, 1941, and ended on September 28, 1941. The program was sponsored by International Silver.

== 1943-1944 (Ed Sullivan Entertains) ==
Ed Sullivan Entertains was the basis for Sullivan's later television program. The show began on CBS on September 13, 1943, and ended on June 5, 1944. It was sponsored by Mennen. In addition to Sullivan, the variety show featured Terry Allen, Lynne Gardner, and Adele Gerard. Will Bradley led the orchestra, and David Ross and Harry von Zell were announcers.

== 1946 (Ed Sullivan's Pipelines) ==
Ed Sullivan's Pipelines was a quarter-hour program that ran on the Blue Network from April 2, 1946, to September 30, 1946.
