= American Radio Warblers =

American Radio Warblers was a musical radio program of live canaries heard on the Mutual Broadcasting System from 1937 to 1952, airing at various times (12:45, 1:15, 1:30, 2:15 pm) on Sunday afternoons. The show originated from Chicago.

The ten canaries, known as "the original feathered stars of the air" were placed in cages near an organ and were heard singing while accompanied by organist Preston Sellers. The program was used in local promotions to sell canaries, bird seed and various bird products.

Recordings of the canaries were also available on 78 rpm and 45 rpm records, each packaged inside paper sleeves. The records were produced by Arthur C. Barnett, who also released a related instructional record.
