= Harry Horlick =

American violinist and bandleader

Harry Horlick at NBC.

Harry Horlick (born Gila Gorlik; July 20, 1896 – July 1970) was an American violinist and bandleader best known for leading The A&P Gypsies, "the first commercially sponsored musical act on radio".

== Early years ==
Horlick was born in Konotop, Ukraine, according to his sworn naturalization and draft registrations, while other sources list Kyiv or Cherinkow, "a little hamlet just outside of Moscow, Russia". His brother's lack of financial success as concertmaster of the Imperial Opera Company of Tiflis caused their father to oppose another son's being a professional musician. Undeterred, Horlick built a violin when was six years old and played during his father's absences. Eventually the brothers persuaded their father to let Horlick have formal training in music. He went on to graduate from a conservatory in Tiflis.

== Military service and melodies ==
During two years' service in the Russian army, Horlick's violin went unused; then he was captured by Bolshevik forces. They had him play first in a symphony orchestra and later in an opera company's orchestra. At some point he escaped and returned to Tiflis, then continued to Constantinople. That city contained refugees from various parts of Europe. As Horlick heard musicians from diverse backgrounds play in Constantinople's cafes, he collected tunes that he later featured during his American career.

On January 20, 1922, Horlick arrived in the United States to reunite with his parents, who had moved before the war began. The change was made possible with the help of the American Consul in Constantinople, who also enabled several of Horlick's musically inclined compatriots to accompany him.

Horlick's interest in music with European roots continued. He went to France and Italy, where he spent time in exchanges with gypsy groups, hearing and learning their native music and, in turn, performing for them. Horlick later fashioned much of that music into scores for his orchestra's performances. People who desired to buy copies of most of those pieces were unable to do so because the works had not been published. Some of the compositions were never transcribed on paper; Horlick taught them to the orchestra members, who played them without benefit of printed music.

As Horlick's career progressed, he incorporated music from South America. A 1928 vacation in Brazil and Argentina exposed him to native music from those countries, and he arranged exchanges whereby composers in South America each week sent him music that he introduced to audiences in the United States.

== Career ==
Horlick played violin in a symphony orchestra in Moscow before military service intervened. After he came to the United States, his career took a turn toward more popular music. A radio official heard a string ensemble that Horlick led at the Petrouschka club in New York, leading to the group's gaining a contract to perform on the air. In 1923, Horlick and the A & P Gypsies began broadcasting on WEAF radio in New York. The group also recorded on the Brunswick label.

In the Gypsies' early years, Horlick usually led the group by playing his violin, rather than using a baton. A newspaper article described his technique as follows:

He stands in front of them, the fiddle under his chin, the bow moving rhythmically across the strings. But his eyes move; they flash, they are soft; there is fire in their black depths. The musicians watch his eyes, for they are the cue to the music.

As the orchestra grew larger, Horlick increasingly focused his efforts on directing, but he still occasionally played his violin with the group.

After the Gypsies disbanded, Horlick formed the Harry Horlick Orchestra, which recorded on the Decca label, and he led the Decca Salon Orchestra, which also recorded on Decca.

Horlick also recorded radio programs NBC's Thesaurus music service and for the World Broadcasting System. By April 1940, The syndicated service offered 56 episodes of Harry Horlick Presents, featuring his orchestra and the Imperial Male Chorus.
