= Adventure Parade =

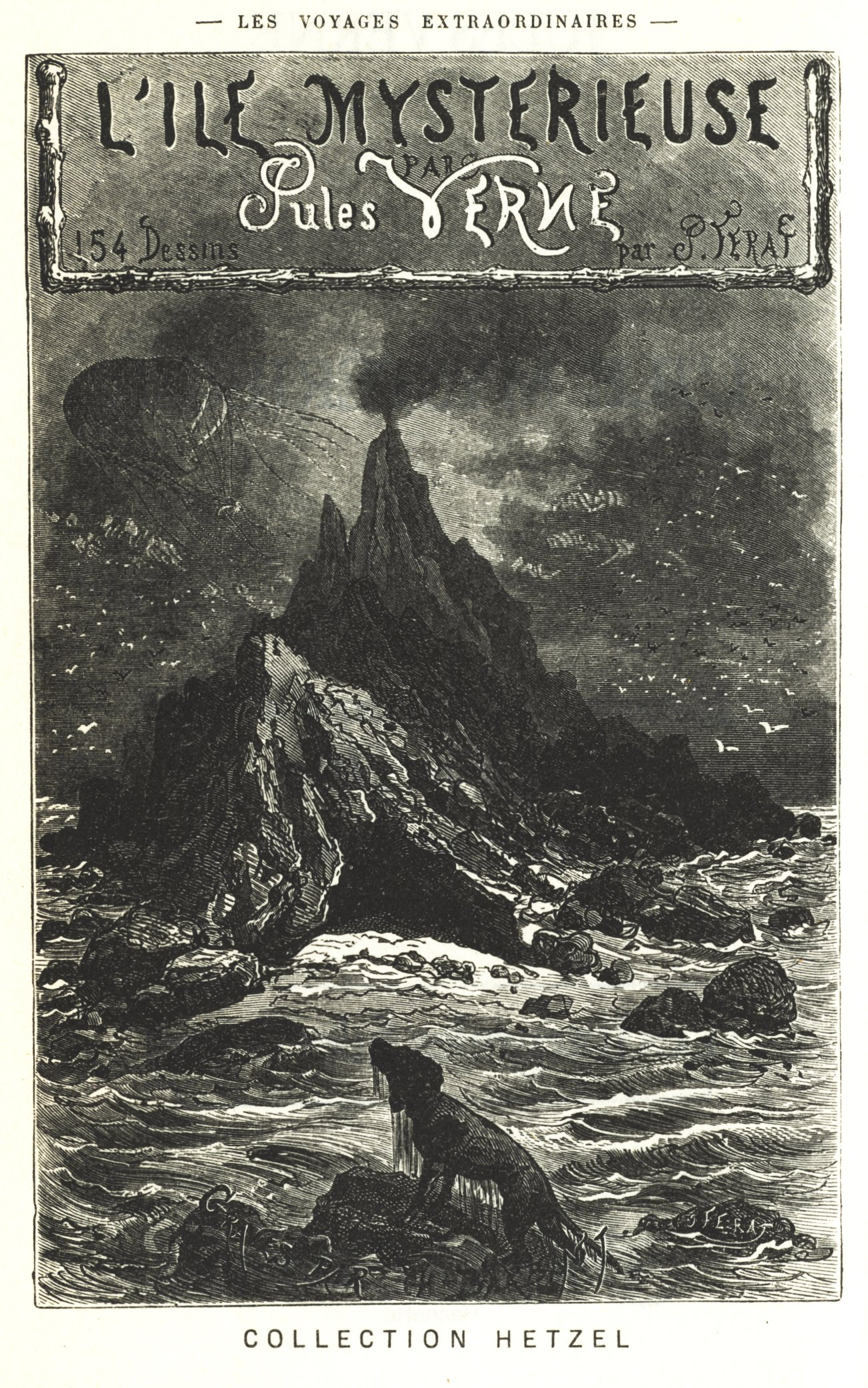

Adventure Parade was a 15-minute daily radio anthology series that was broadcast on Mutual from 1946 to 1949, produced and directed by Robert and Jessica Maxwell.

The show opened with announcer George Hogan calling, "Adventurers attention! Fall in for Adventure Parade!" With liberal doses of action and adventure, the program adapted such classics of literature as Moby-Dick, The Last of the Mohicans, and Swiss Family Robinson, with each tale lasting about a week.

A WMIK Radio-Gram for January 17, 1949, noted:

An hour of entertainment for the kids: Jules Verne’s Mysterious Island is air adapted on the Adventure Parade this week. Also there is Superman, Captain Midnight and Tom Mix.

Radio Life magazine stated that host-storyteller John Drake brought "compelling suspense" to the program. Drake did all the voices in each serialized drama while organist John Gart provided background music.

== Listen to ==
- Adventure Parade: "The Bells of Lieden Sing" (November 25, 1948)
- Adventure Parade: "The Bells of Lieden Sing" (November 26, 1948)
