= The Five Mysteries Program =

The Five Mysteries Program is an audience participation radio series broadcast on the Mutual Broadcasting System August 10, 1947 – March 27, 1950. In 1947-48 it aired on Sundays at 2 p.m.

Such mysteries were produced and syndicated (1945–48) to individual local radio stations as a "barter-trade" program to sell advertising to local merchants or trade the advertising announcements for goods, services or premiums, such as prizes awarded to listeners in radio station contests or promotions. To facilitate personalizing the shows to individual stations and insert the local ads, the producers put musical interludes in the shows with enough time for a local announcer to introduce the episode, present the advertiser's message and wrap things up with other local information.

Each 30-minute episode featured five mini-mysteries dramatized with actors, organ music and sound effects. Solutions to each mystery were then suggested by a panel of listeners and studio guests. The panelists sometimes shared a common background; for example, on the April 14, 1949 program, the amateur sleuths were gas industry officials.

Cast members included Jackson Beck, Staats Cotsworth, Michael Fitzmaurice, Timmy Hyler, Abby Lewis, Frank Lovejoy and Ian MacAllister. Organist Rosa Rio provided the music.

While the premise was simple, the mysteries were well written, requiring some thought to come up with the right answer. Similar to the Ellery Queen's Minute Mysteries, one listened to the story, evaluated the clues, and at the conclusion, matched wits with the sleuths to correctly identify the suspect. It was one of the few interactive radio shows.
