= Murder Is My Hobby =

American radio mystery series

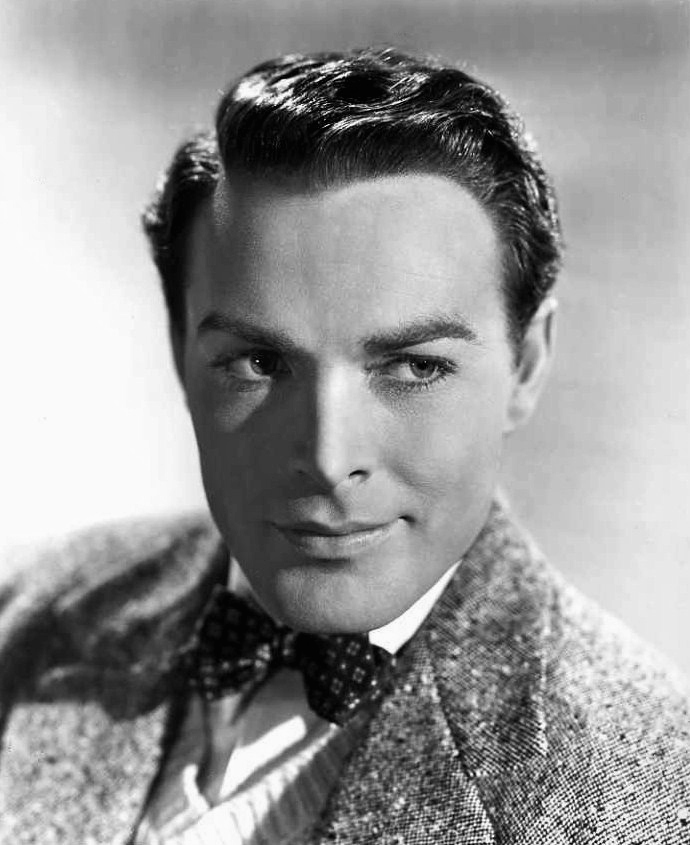
- Glenn Langan
- Other names: Mystery Is My Hobby
- Running time: 30 minutes
- Country of origin: United States
- Language: English
- Syndicates: Mutual
- Starring: Glenn Langan
- Announcer: Rod O'Connor; Bruce Buell
- Written by: Richard Wilkinson
- Directed by: Dave Titus
- Produced by: Raymond R. Morgan
- Original release: October 14, 1945 – 1951
- Sponsored by: Cystex; Mendaco

Murder Is My Hobby (also titled Mystery is My Hobby) is an American radio mystery program that was broadcast on Mutual in 1945–1946. The 30-minute program debuted on October 14, 1945, and ended on July 14, 1946. It was sponsored by Mendaco.

Before Murder Is My Hobby was broadcast nationwide, it was carried on six Don Lee Pacific stations, sponsored by Cystex, beginning in April 1945.

Glenn Langan portrayed Barton Drake, a police inspector and the author of the book Mystery Is My Hobby. Drake combined his professions by collecting material for stories while he solved crimes. Rod O'Connor was the announcer, and Richard Wilkinson was the writer.

The program was revised and retitled Mystery Is My Hobby. It still featured Drake, but he was a "wealthy mystery writer who works with the police". Episodes of the program were presented as cases from the book Mystery Is My Hobby. A typical opening had Drake saying: "For this week's drama I've selected Case History 127 from my book, Mystery Is My Hobby. I call it 'Death Is a Grain of Sand'". At the end of each episode he gave the case number and title of the next week's episode. The show was first broadcast on Mutual, and from 1949 to 1951 it was syndicated.

Langhan again portrayed Drake, and Inspector Danton was played by Ken Christy and Norman Field. Charles Lung had the role of Blake's houseboy, Mike. Bruce Buell was the announcer, and Len Salvo provided music. Dave Titus was the director, and Raymond R. Morgan was the producer.

== Television ==
In 1950, Reynolds Productions created a TV version of Mystery Is My Business, also starring Langhan. Titled Mystery Is My Hobby, it debuted on February 17, 1950, on WNBT-TV in New York City. Sponsored by Polaroid TV Filters, the program was recorded via kinescope at KNBH-TV in Hollywood.
