= And They Call It Democracy =

- Genre: current affairs, Latin America
- Running time: 15-30 min.
- Country of origin: United States
- Languages: English, Spanish
- Home station: KPOV-LP
- Hosted by: Timoteo Jeffries
- Created by: Timoteo Jeffries
- Recording studio: Bend, Oregon
- Original release: June 29, 2005 – November 5, 2008
- Opening theme: Call It Democracy
- Website: www.AndTheyCallItDemocracy.com

And They Call It Democracy is a radio program which ran from June 2005 to November 2008 on KPOV-LP in Bend, Oregon, United States, hosted by Timoteo Jeffries. And They Call It Democracy's tagline is "news and analysis from a leftist, socialist, and environmentalist perspective".

== Production ==
=== Format ===
Broadcasts generally consisted of coverage of current events, especially related to politics, media, and US relations with Latin America, using a range of English and Spanish news sources were used. Analysis and opinion was provided by Jeffries and often focused on the fundamental differences in the reporting of the issues by mainstream US and alternative or Latin American sources. Each section of the show (except for some of the earliest broadcasts) was read by Jeffries in both English and Spanish. Some broadcasts featured Jeffries' wife (a native Spanish speaker) providing the Spanish translation.

=== Air times ===
During the November 5, 2008, broadcast Jeffries announced that he would be going on sabbatical. New shows are not currently being produced.

The latest shows of And They Call It Democracy were broadcast on every other Wednesday at 5 p.m. on KPOV-LP. The KPOV website hosts the latest broadcasts of their shows available for download. As of November 6, 2008 the show's website has started to provide archived audio and transcripts from past broadcasts.
