= Champion Spark Plug Hour =

American music radio program

- The Champion Sparkers
- Running time: 30 minutes
- Country of origin: United States
- Language: English
- Home station: NBC Blue Network (By 1928); WJZ (1920s/1930s); WGY (1920s/1930s)
- Starring: Champion Sparkers Male Quartet
- Directed by: Gus Haenschen
- Original release: 1920s – 1930s
- Opening theme: "The March of the Champions"

Champion Spark Plug Hour was a music radio program sponsored by Champion. It was broadcast on New York's WJZ and WGY during the late 1920s and early 1930s. An entry in The Chronicle-Telegram (Elyria, Ohio) for October 4, 1926, indicates the show aired on Tuesday afternoons at 5 p.m. By 1928, they were heard Wednesday evenings at 8 p.m. on the NBC Blue Network.

== Overview ==
The program featured the Champion Sparkers Male Quartet and an orchestra conducted by Walter Gustave "Gus" Haenschen. Personnel in the band included Sam Lewis (trombone), Earl Oliver (trumpet), Merle Johnston (saxophone) and Phil Gleason. Irving Kaufman (1890-1976) was a featured vocalist with the band.

The Oswego Palladium-Times (Oswego, New York) offered a description of the program for December 27, 1928:

The Champion Sparkers will present Ed Smalle. singing comedian as featured soloist during their program which will be heard from WHAM and other stations of the NBC System at 8 o'clock tonight. Smalle's numbers include "Happy Days and Lonely Nights," "All By Yourself in the Moonlight" and "The Sun is at My Window." The delicate "Valse Viennese" is offered in an interesting arrangement for saxophones.

Haenschen, who was also the program's director, composed the show's theme song, "The March of the Champions" (a.k.a. "Champion Sparkers March").

The orchestra and quartet recorded for Brunswick Records in 1931, including William Tell Overture, The Mikado, Peer Gynt Suites, "Parade of the Wooden Soldiers," "Just Bubbling Over with Love" and "Lilting Lucia."
