= The A&P Gypsies =

American radio mjusical series

The A&P Gypsies is a musical series broadcast on radio beginning in 1924. With the opening theme of "Two Guitars," the host and band leader was Harry Horlick, who had learned gypsy folk music while traveling with gypsy bands in Istanbul.

== Background and history ==
Born July 20, 1896, in Tiflis, Russia (now named Tbilisi, Georgia), Horlick remained in Russia when his family left for America at the beginning on World War I, and he became a prisoner of war. His family and the American consul helped him get to the United States where he performed in cafés in the early 1920s. Horlick's six-piece ensemble was playing unsponsored on New York's WEAF (the station on which the group had its first broadcast) in the winter of 1923 when they were seen by a Great Atlantic & Pacific Tea Company executive who was taking a tour of the radio studio. The music group began regular broadcasts, sponsored by A&P, on Monday nights, beginning March 17, 1924.

As noted by Elizabeth McLeod, such musical features were central to programming of the period:

The most popular program format of the late 1920s was the sponsored musical feature. It could be a large symphonic group, a dance orchestra, or a song-and-patter team—and it would usually carry the sponsor's name. The A&P Gypsies, for example—a large, genre-crossing orchestra conducted by Harry Horlick. The Ipana Troubadors—a hot dance band directed by Sam Lanin. The Goodrich Zippers—a banjo-driven orchestra conducted by Harry Reser, when he wasn't leading the same group under the name of The Clicquot Club Eskimos. Everyone remembers The Happiness Boys, Billy Jones and Ernie Hare—but what about Scrappy Lambert and Billy Hillpot, who performed exactly the same sort of material as Trade and Mark, The Smith Brothers. The list is endless: The Silvertown Cord Orchestra, featuring the Silver Masked Tenor. The Sylvania Foresters. The Flit Soldiers—yet another Harry Reser group. The Champion Sparkers. The Fox Fur Trappers. The Ingram Shavers, who were the Ipana Troubadours on alternate Wednesdays. The Yeast Foamers. The Planters Pickers. And, the magnificently named Freed-Eisemann Orchestradians. All playing pretty much the same sorts of music, all announced by Phillips Carlin or John S. Young or Alwyn Bach or Milton Cross in pretty much the same sort of stiffly formal style.

On January 3, 1927, the show moved to NBC, heard for an hour on Mondays at 9pm and then at 8:30pm from 1928 until 1931 when it split into two half-hours, one on the Blue Network Thursdays at 10pm and the other on the Red Network Mondays at 9pm. Beginning in 1932, the show was reduced to a half-hour on the Red Network only, heard on Mondays at 9pm. Phillips Carlin and Milton Cross were the show's announcers.

In 1933, A&P took part in the World's Fair in Chicago with a canopied boardwalk where tea dances were held, and free tea and coffee samples were distributed. The many listeners to The A&P Gypsies came by the thousands to the A&P Carnival, a 2,000-seat amphitheater featuring shows by the A&P Marionette Revue, Harry Horlick and the A&P Gypsies and other entertainments. In Popular Music for Orchestra, Dick O'Connor described the appeal of the radio program:

It may have been some of the early experiments in symphonic jazz that inspired violinist Harry Horlick to include concert versions of popular hits on his A&P Gypsies show. The Gypsies began as a six-piece salon group with a repertoire that ran the gamut from classical and semi-classical to folk and Gypsy music. From 1923–24 into the 1930s they were the most popular instrumental music program on the air. Horlick’s genius was for simple, logical, concise arrangements of tunes that added vital narrative, dramatic, and vibrant orchestral elements, effectively transforming them into light classical compositions. His highly melodic treatments, by turns soaring, fiery, or sentimental, provided listeners with a welcome alternative to the more frenzied heavily rhythmic dance music of the period. Toward the end of the decade the Gypsies, maintaining the same style, content, and characteristics, expanded to a fashionable 30-piece ensemble which Horlick scored in a deft, well-balanced, and richly satisfying theatre orchestra manner.

The musicians performed while wearing gypsy costumes, and over time the six-man ensemble expanded to the 25-piece A&P Red Circle Orchestra, plus a singing quartet. One member of the quartet was Frank Parker, who later became a regular on the shows of Arthur Godfrey and Jack Benny. Guest stars included Frank Munn, Kate Smith and Jessica Dragonette. When the series came to an end on September 7, 1936, A&P was forming a new alliance and product identification with Kate Smith by sponsoring Kate Smith's Coffee Time (1935–36) and The Kate Smith A&P Bandwagon (1936–37).

After The A&P Gypsies run (1924–36), Decca signed Horlick for almost 20 sets of 78s featuring what was described as "musically sturdy, if somewhat careful, albums, with a number devoted to popular and theatre music." Horlick died in July 1970, but his music lives on with 78 rpm transfers to CDs by the Switzerland-based Guild Records and other companies. Horlick's 1930s recordings can be found in such collections as The Golden Age of Light Music: In Town Tonight—The 1930s, Volume II (Guild) and A Victor Herbert Showcase (Pearl).
