= Thesaurus (radio transcription service) =

Thesaurus was an American syndication service that provided transcribed programs for use by radio stations.

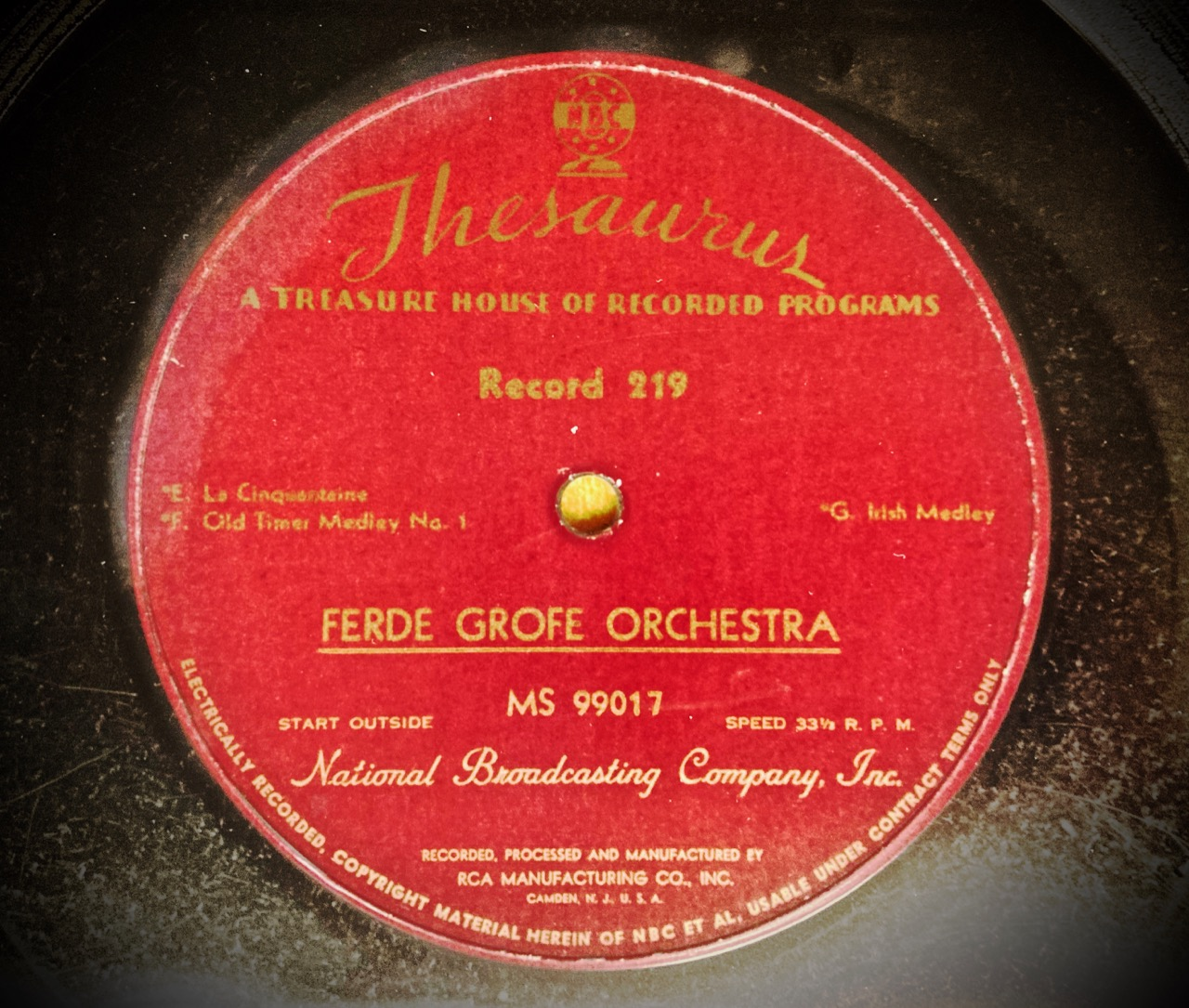
16" NBC Thesaurus Transcription Disc Label

== Origin ==
The National Broadcasting Company of New York City launched the Thesaurus program service on July 15, 1935. It was the third such service in the United States after World Broadcasting System (the first) and Standard Radio Advertising Co., Inc. An advertisement in the June 15, 1935, issue of the trade publication Broadcasting described the service as "A Treasure House of Recorded Programs" and noted that Thesaurus would be demonstrated at the upcoming convention of the National Association of Broadcasters.

An article in that same issue of Broadcasting reported:

[T]he initial plan is to offer to stations a library of approximately 400 units at the outset, including leading musical aggregations and soloists, along with dramatic skits, comedy teams and other diversified program arrangements. These will be designed for local, regional or national sponsorship. The discs will be 33 1/3 r.p.m., it is indicated, with some 40 to 50 additional units added on a monthly basis.

Prior to the announcement of the new service, "steady activity at the RCA Victor studios in New York" had involved NBC artists who were to be heard on programs provided by Thesaurus.

== Concept ==
An article in Sponsor magazine's January 15, 1951, issue illustrated how programs provided by syndication services had evolved from "just a collection of indexed records". The half-hour RCA Thesaurus program Concert Hall of the Air contained an average of eight songs per episode, with Arthur Fiedler directing the orchestra. While the recording's introduction played in the background, the local station's announcer read from a script, "Ladies and gentlemen, the Concert Hall of the Air, Arthur Fiedler conducting." "Then eight selections follow, interspersed with brief descriptions of the pieces."

Music services' advantages cited by Sponsor were:

1. Provide nationally known talent at a low cost.
2. Provide long, integrated series of programs arranged and paced especially for balanced radio listening.
3. Combine professional music, program, and script talent with the appeal of local announcing.
4. The majority of stations have at least one library service, some more than one.
5. Clear, high-fidelity reproduction is insured on vinyl plastic.

== Growth ==
By June 1936, Thesaurus had 140 radio stations as subscribers, with 17.25 hours of programs available per week.

== Genres of music ==
Thesaurus provided a spectrum of musical styles from which broadcasters could select programs.

=== Big bands ===
Swing and Sway with Sammy Kaye offered Kaye's orchestra's mixture of both sweet and swing big-band music.

=== Jazz ===
The Jumpin' Jacks with Patti Dugan featured "stylized swing".

=== Variety ===
The Music of Manhattan ranged from Dixieland to dance-orchestra style.

== Drama ==
Thesaurus programs included soap operas such as Aunt Mary, Dr. Paul and Betty and Bob.

== Custom programs ==
Thesaurus produced custom-designed programs for specific advertisers, such as The Ford V-8 Revue in 1936. The series of 13 quarter-hour programs featured orchestra leader Ferde Grofé with soprano Marguerite Howard and the Buccaneers. Ford dealers arranged for broadcast of the programs on their local radio stations. The arrangement was similar to one that Ford had with the World Broadcasting System for another program that same spring.

== Canada ==
By 1946, 36 radio stations in Canada were using Thesaurus.

== Television ==
In the 1950s, Thesaurus began a film service for television stations. Its products included feature-length films "including U.S. premiere, first run and first on TV."

== Partial list of Thesaurus programs ==
- Dinner Hour
- Musical Clock
- Paul Wing, the Story Man
- Radio Night Club
