= List of old-time American radio people =

Listed below are actors and personalities heard on vintage radio programs, plus writers and others associated with Radio's Golden Age.

== A ==
- Bud Abbott
- Goodman Ace
- Jane Ace
- Roy Acuff
- Franklin Pierce Adams
- Mason Adams
- Martin Agronsky
- Ben Alexander
- Joan Alexander
- Barbara Jo Allen
- Fred Allen
- Gracie Allen
- Ida Bailey Allen
- Mel Allen
- Peggy Allenby
- Fran Allison
- Elvia Allman
- Don Ameche
- Jim Ameche
- Morey Amsterdam
- Arthur Anderson
- Eddie "Rochester" Anderson
- Marian Anderson
- The Andrews Sisters
- George Ansbro
- Eve Arden
- Robert Armbruster
- Garner Ted Armstrong
- Herbert W. Armstrong
- Louis Armstrong
- Cliff Arquette
- Jon Arthur
- Robert Arthur, Jr.
- Eleanor Audley
- Artie Auerbach
- Paul Harvey Aurandt
- Gene Austin
- Gene Autry
- Hy Averback
- George Axelrod
- Lew Ayres

== B ==
- Harry Babbitt
- Jim Backus
- Parley Baer
- Bob Bailey
- Jack Bailey
- Eugenie Baird
- Art Baker
- Belle Baker
- Kenny Baker
- Lucille Ball
- Edwin Balmer
- Sam Balter
- Tallulah Bankhead
- Joan Banks
- Howard Barlow
- Donald Grey Barnhouse
- The Barry Sisters
- Ethel Barrymore
- Lionel Barrymore
- Harry Bartell
- André Baruch
- Count Basie
- Charita Bauer
- Erik Bauersfeld
- Gordon Baxter
- Morgan Beatty
- Louise Beavers
- Jackson Beck
- Sandy Becker
- Brace Beemer
- Ed Begley
- Shirley Bell
- William J. Bell
- Bea Benaderet
- William Bendix
- Al Benson
- Jack Benny
- Jack Berch
- Gertrude Berg
- Edgar Bergen
- Milton Berle
- Bunny Berigan
- Sara Berner
- Ben Bernie
- Dick Bertel
- Alfred Bester
- Rolly Bester
- Don Bestor
- Dr. Frank Black
- Joan Blaine
- Mel Blanc
- Ray Bloch
- Martin Block
- Ford Bond
- Johnny Bond
- Nelson S. Bond
- Shirley Booth
- Victor Borge
- The Boswell Sisters
- Anthony Boucher
- Willis Bouchey
- Major Edward Bowes
- William Boyd
- Ray Bradbury
- Bertha Brainard
- Eddie Bracken
- Truman Bradley
- Rod Brasfield
- Tom Breneman
- Fanny Brice
- Norman Brokenshire
- Cecil Brown
- Himan Brown
- John Brown (actor)
- Oscar Brown, Jr.
- Vanessa Brown
- Nigel Bruce
- Arthur Q. Bryan
- Willie Bryant
- Lyman Bryson
- Winston Burdett
- Billie Burke
- Georgia Burke
- Smiley Burnette
- Bob Burns
- George Burns
- Edgar White Burrill
- Abe Burrows
- Francis X. Bushman
- Daws Butler
- Herb Butterfield
- Pat Buttram

== C ==
- Cab Calloway
- Floyd J. Calvin
- Kay Campbell
- Candy Candido
- Judy Canova
- Charlie Cantor
- Eddie Cantor
- Phillips Carlin
- Kitty Carlisle
- Hoagy Carmichael
- Art Carney
- Don Carney
- Ken Carpenter
- Thelma Carpenter
- Jack Carson
- Boake Carter
- Thomas Cassidy
- Del Castillo
- Carmen Cavallaro
- John Chancellor
- Ernest Chappell
- Paddy Chayefsky
- Adele Clark
- Dane Clark
- Lon Clark
- Inez Clough
- Al "Jazzbo" Collins
- Nat King Cole
- Shirley Bell Cole
- Charles Collingwood
- Ray Collins
- Ted Collins
- Bud Collyer
- Ronald Colman
- Jerry Colonna
- Pinto Colvig
- Perry Como
- Willis Conover
- William Conrad
- Hans Conried
- John Conte
- Spade Cooley
- Jack L. Cooper
- Wyllis Cooper
- Ted Corday
- Charles Correll
- Bill Corum
- Norman Corwin
- Lou Costello
- Staats Cotsworth
- Joseph Cotten
- Jim Cox
- Bob Crane
- Sally Creighton
- Richard Crenna
- Mary Jane Croft
- Bing Crosby
- Milton Cross
- Frank Crumit
- Xavier Cugat
- Bill Cullen
- Countee Cullen
- Howard Culver
- Adelaide Hawley Cumming

== D ==
- Dilip Kumar
- John Daly
- Cass Daley
- Dorthy Dandridge
- Ruby Dandridge
- Vivian Dandridge
- Marcia Davenport
- Elmer Davis
- Joan Davis
- Dennis Day
- Doris Day
- Rosemary DeCamp
- Ruby Dee
- Ted de Corsia
- Don DeFore
- John Dehner
- Kenny Delmar
- Richard Denning
- George V. Denny, Jr.
- Van Des Autels
- Andy Devine
- Lawrence Dobkin
- Peter Donald
- Jack Douglas
- Paul Douglas
- Morton Downey
- Bill Downs
- Hugh Downs
- Jessica Dragonette
- Margaret Draper
- Alex Dreier
- Leanna Field Driftmier
- Elaine Dundy
- Joseph Dunninger
- John Dunning
- Don Dunphy
- Jimmy Durante
- Richard Durham

== E ==
- Robert Easton
- Nelson Eddy
- Cliff Edwards
- Douglas Edwards
- Ralph Edwards
- Webley Edwards
- George Fielding Eliot
- Minetta Ellen
- Duke Ellington
- Win Elliot
- Bob Elliott
- Dave Elman
- Hope Emerson
- Skinnay Ennis
- Theodore Epp
- Dale Evans
- Leonard Evans

== F ==
- Clifton Fadiman
- Percy Faith
- Jinx Falkenburg
- Alice Faye
- Verna Felton
- Parker Fennelly
- George Fenneman
- Jimmy Fidler
- Joan Field
- Benny Fields
- Ted Fio Rito
- Eddie Firestone
- Michael Fitzmaurice
- Bernardine Flynn
- Bess Flynn
- The Fontane Sisters
- June Foray
- Mary Ford
- Senator Edward Ford
- Bill Forman
- Templeton Fox
- Fred Foy
- Arlene Francis
- William Franklin
- Stan Freberg
- David Freedman
- Paul Frees
- Jane Froman
- Alice Frost
- Charles E. Fuller
- Allen Funt

== G ==
- Martin Gabel
- Frank Gallop
- Jan Garber
- Betty Garde
- Ed Gardner
- Dave Garroway
- Betty Lou Gerson
- Georgia Gibbs
- GI Jill
- Mercedes Gilbert
- Dolores Gillen
- Art Gillham
- Art Gilmore
- Charles Sidney Gilpin
- Roy Glenn
- George Gobel
- Arthur Godfrey
- Norris Goff
- Benny Goodman
- Bill Goodwin
- Gale Gordon
- Freeman Gosden
- Morton Gould
- Sandra Gould
- Ray Goulding
- Martin Grams, Jr.
- Johnny Grant
- Ben Grauer
- Barry Gray
- Glen Gray
- Eddie Green
- Johnny Green
- Oliver B. Greene
- Sydney Greenstreet
- Virginia Gregg
- Ferde Grofé
- Edgar Guest
- Tito Guizar

== H ==
- Jester Hairston
- Jack Haley
- Juanita Hall
- Walter Hampden
- Fred Haney
- Ernie Hare
- Richard Harkness
- Jim Harmon
- Tom Harmon
- Arlene Harris
- Marion Harris
- Phil Harris
- Joseph C. Harsch
- Georgette Harvey
- Wilbur Hatch
- Bob Hawk
- Jim Hawthorne
- Bill Hay
- George D. Hay
- Helen Hayes
- John Michael Hayes
- Peter Lind Hayes
- Dick Haymes
- Paul Hecht
- Horace Heidt
- Fletcher Henderson
- Skitch Henderson
- Ed Herlihy
- Juano Hernandez
- Bernard Herrmann
- Jean Hersholt
- George Hicks
- Hildegarde
- Ruby Hill
- Richard Himber
- Earl Hines
- Don Hollenbeck
- Sterling Holloway
- Skip Homeier
- Hoosier Hot Shots
- Bob Hope
- Lena Horne
- Edward Everett Horton
- Richard C. Hottelet
- Eddy Howard
- Quincy Howe
- Arthur Hughes
- Wilbur Budd Hulick
- Warren Hull
- Benita Hume
- Anne Hummert
- Chet Huntley
- Zora Neale Hurston
- Marlin Hurt
- Ted Husing

== I ==
- Bill Idelson
- Rex Ingram
- The Ipana Troubadors
- Jose Iturbi
- Burl Ives

== J ==
- Hal Jackson
- Maze Jackson
- Gee Gee James
- House Jameson
- Leon Janney
- Vernon Jarrett
- Gordon Jenkins
- Georgie Jessel
- Eva Jessye
- Vere Everette Johns
- Hall Johnson
- Parks Johnson
- Raymond Edward Johnson
- Al Jolson
- Billy Jones
- Clarence M. Jones
- Spike Jones
- Venzella Jones
- Jim Jordan
- Marian Jordan
- Victor Jory
- Jay Jostyn

== K ==
- Ish Kabibble
- Mickey Katz
- Danny Kaye
- Evelyn Kaye
- Joseph Kearns
- Jackie Kelk
- Joe Kelly
- Pert Kelton
- John B. Kennedy
- Nick Kenny
- Ted Key
- William Bennett Kilpack
- John Reed King
- Ernest Kinoy
- Walter Kinsella
- Durwood Kirby
- Dorothy Kirsten
- Raymond Knight
- Richard Kollmar
- André Kostelanetz
- Gene Krupa
- Jack Kruschen
- Eloise Kummer
- Joel J. Kupperman
- Kay Kyser

== L ==
- Arthur Lake
- Dan Landt
- Jack Landt
- Karl Landt
- Frances Langford
- Chester Lauck
- Joe Laurie, Jr.
- Paul Lavalle
- Canada Lee
- Peggy Lee
- Pinky Lee
- Richard LeGrand
- Lew Lehr
- Sheldon Leonard
- Jack Lescoulie
- Larry LeSueur
- Oscar Levant
- Cathy Lewis
- Elliott Lewis
- Forrest Lewis
- Fulton Lewis
- Monica Lewis
- Robert Q. Lewis
- Beatrice Lillie
- Art Linkletter
- James Lipton
- Mary Livingstone
- Guy Lombardo
- Vincent Lopez
- Phillips Lord
- Frank Lovejoy
- George Lowther
- Barbara Luddy
- Bela Lugosi
- Jimmy Lydon
- Abe Lyman

== M ==
- Franklyn MacCormack
- Norman Macdonnell
- Nila Mack
- Ted Mack
- Gisele MacKenzie
- Gordon MacRae
- Dick Manning
- Knox Manning
- Fletcher Markle
- Herbert Marshall
- Dick Martin
- Sara (a.k.a. Sarah) Martin
- Chico Marx
- Groucho Marx
- Harpo Marx
- Elsa Maxwell
- Marilyn Maxwell
- Sherman "Jocko" Maxwell
- Mary Margaret McBride
- Mercedes McCambridge
- Clem McCarthy
- John Edward McCarthy
- Gordon McLendon
- Smilin' Ed McConnell
- John McCormack
- Myron McCormick
- Joel McCrea
- Tex McCrary
- Hattie McDaniel
- Lou McGarity
- J. Vernon McGee
- Artie Bell McGinty
- John McIntire
- Elizabeth McLeod
- Graham McNamee
- Howard McNear
- Don McNeill
- Butterfly McQueen
- James Melton
- Lou Merrill
- The Merry Macs
- Don Messick
- Glenn Miller
- Marvin Miller
- Spike Milligan
- Billy Mills
- The Mills Brothers
- Jan Miner
- Abrica "Abbie" Mitchell
- Shirley Mitchell
- The Modernaires
- Gerald Mohr
- Vaughn Monroe
- Ralph Moody
- Garry Moore
- Sam Moore
- Agnes Moorehead
- Mantan Moreland
- Claudia Morgan
- Frank Morgan
- Henry Morgan
- Bret Morrison
- Carlton E. Morse
- Carlton Moss
- Jack Moyles
- Merrill Mueller
- Frank Munn
- Clarence Muse

== N ==
- Conrad Nagel
- J. Carrol Naish
- Long John Nebel
- Frank Nelson
- Ozzie Nelson
- Ricky Nelson
- John Nesbitt
- Allan Nevins
- Earl Nightingale
- Ken Niles
- Wendell Niles
- Ray Noble
- Ken Nordine
- Jack Norworth
- Jay Novello
- Louis Nye

== O ==
- Jack Oakie
- Arch Oboler
- Anita O'Day
- Spencer Odom
- Dan O'Herlihy
- Walter O'Keefe
- Nelson Olmsted
- Johnny Olson
- Santos Ortega
- Roi Ottley
- Gary Owens
- Harry Owens

== P ==
- Jack Paar
- Raymond Paige
- William S. Paley
- Korla Pandit
- Don Pardo
- Harry Parke
- Dorothy Parker
- Bert Parks
- Les Paul
- Edward Pawley
- Virginia Payne
- Al Pearce
- Jack Pearl
- Minnie Pearl
- Drew Pearson
- Harold Peary
- Jan Peerce
- Louis Pelletier
- Vincent Pelletier
- Joe Penner
- Irna Phillips
- Minerva Pious
- The Pied Pipers
- George Polk
- Lily Pons
- Cowan Powers and his Family Band
- Roger Price
- Louie Prima
- Carl Princi
- Florence Pritchett
- George Putnam
- Joe Pyne

== Q ==
- Don Quinn

== R ==
- Michael Raffetto
- Katharine Raht
- Amanda Randolph
- Lillian Randolph
- Basil Rathbone
- Herbert Rawlinson
- Stratton Rawson
- Alan Reed
- Alice Reinheart
- Ethel Remey
- Harry Reasoner
- Seymour Rexite
- Quentin Reynolds
- Paul Rhymer
- Irene Rich
- Emory Richardson
- Tommy Riggs
- Rin Tin Tin
- Rosa Rio
- Robert Ripley
- Ken Roberts
- Paul Robeson
- Jackie Robinson
- William N. Robson
- Roy Rogers
- Will Rogers
- B. A. Rolfe
- Mickey Rooney
- Luis van Rooten
- David Rose
- Norman Rose
- David Ross
- Earle Ross
- Lanny Ross
- Johnny Roventini
- Cecil Roy
- Benny Rubin
- Melville Ruick
- Babe Ruth
- Alfred Ryder
- Michael Rye

== S ==
- Julia Sanderson
- David Sarnoff
- Harry Secombe
- Vivienne Segal
- Peter Sellers
- Rod Serling
- Eric Sevareid
- Dan Seymour
- Walter Scharf
- Del Sharbutt
- Artie Shaw
- Irwin Shaw
- L. R. Shelton, Sr.
- Jean Shepherd
- Ransom Sherman
- Nathaniel Shilkret
- William L. Shirer
- Dinah Shore
- Herb Shriner
- Ginny Sims
- Hilda Simms
- Singin' Sam
- Frank Sinatra
- Jasdev Singh
- Penny Singleton
- Red Skelton
- Menasha Skulnik
- Walter Slezak
- Everett Sloane
- J. Scott Smart
- Smilin' Jack Smith
- Bessie Smith
- Elwood Smith
- Ethel Smith
- Hal Smith
- Howard Smith
- Howard K. Smith
- J. Harold Smith
- Whispering Jack Smith
- Kate Smith
- Trixie Smith
- Wonderful Smith
- J. Anthony Smythe
- Sons of the Pioneers
- Olan Soule
- Ann Sothern
- Sigmund Spaeth
- Phil Spitalny
- Lawrence E. Spivak
- Hanley Stafford
- Jo Stafford
- Arnold Stang
- The Real Don Steele
- Leith Stevens
- Jay Stewart
- Nick Stewart
- Paul Stewart
- Ezra Stone
- Hal Stone
- Shelby Storck
- Amzie Strickland
- Fran Striker
- Roba Stanley
- Rex Stout
- Ed Sullivan
- Marion Sweet
- Karl Swenson
- Raymond Gram Swing

== T ==
- Maurice Tarplin
- Eva Taylor
- Frederick Chase Taylor
- Deems Taylor
- Irene Tedrow
- Alec Templeton
- Studs Terkel
- Walter Tetley
- Edna Lewis Thomas
- Danny Thomas
- John Charles Thomas
- Lowell Thomas
- Bill Thompson
- Kay Thompson
- Tedi Thurman
- Lawrence Tibbett
- Martha Tilton
- John Todd
- Mel Torme
- Arturo Toscanini
- Dallas Townsend
- Arthur Tracy
- George W. Trendle
- John Scott Trotter
- Bob Trout
- Dink Trout
- Orrin Tucker
- Sophie Tucker
- Lurene Tuttle

== V ==
- Rudy Vallée
- Art Van Damme
- Art Van Harvey
- Jean Vander Pyl
- Luis van Rooten
- Evelyn Varden
- Westbrook Van Voorhis
- Benay Venuta
- Herb Vigran
- Vicki Vola
- Donald Voorhees

== W ==
- Ernestine Wade
- Bea Wain
- John Wald
- Janet Waldo
- Ed Walker
- Lucille Wall
- Mike Wallace
- Jimmy Wallington
- Fred Waring
- Gertrude Warner
- Mark Warnow
- Willard Waterman
- Ethel Waters
- Doodles Weaver
- Pat Weaver
- Jack Webb
- Ted Weems
- Dwight Weist
- Orson Welles
- Ernest Whitman
- Gayne Whitman
- Paul Whiteman
- Barbara Whiting
- Dick Whittinghill
- Mary Wickes
- Richard Widmark
- Harlow Wilcox
- Clarence Williams
- Nat D. Williams
- Dave Willock
- Meredith Willson
- Frank H. Wilson
- Marie Wilson
- Walter Winchell
- Paula Winslowe
- Miriam Wolfe
- Barbara Jean Wong
- Lesley Woods
- Alexander Woollcott
- Ben Wright
- Ed Wynn

== Y ==
- Barton Yarborough
- Alan Young
- Carleton G. Young
- Robert Young
- Jessie Young
- Roland Young
- Victor Young
- Henny Youngman

== Z ==
- Harry von Zell
- Lawson Zerbe
- Florenz Ziegfeld
- Frederick Ziv

== See also ==
- List of old-time radio programs
- List of U.S. radio programs
