= When Radio Was =

Syndicated radio program

- Genre: old-time radio
- Country of origin: United States
- Language: English
- Syndicates: Radio America
- Hosted by: Greg Bell
- Created by: Carl Amari
- Original release: January 1, 1990
- Website: www.whenradiowas.com

When Radio Was is a syndicated radio program that re-airs old-time radio programs.

== History ==
The series began as a local program in Chicago, hosted by Carl Amari, who was the founder of Radio Spirits, Inc., which sells tapes and CDs of old time radio programs. Former CBS Radio executive Dick Brescia heard an in-flight version of the program and soon mounted a nationally syndicated version of the show (through Dick Brescia Associates), beginning January 1, 1990, and hosted by Art Fleming. (Amari continued to do the local Chicago version until shortly after selling Radio Spirits to MediaBay in 1998.)

The show was first syndicated by Dick Brescia Associates (1990–2003), and later Wilbur Entertainment (2003–2006), and Matrix Media, Inc. (2006–2007). In the summer of 2007, the series owner MediaBay announced the company would be going out of business in September of that year and the show was subsequently purchased in September by a group headed by Norton Herrick, former CEO of MediaBay, Inc. (the company that had purchased Radio Spirits, and thus When Radio Was, back in 1999). The company has since changed ownership again in 2008 and is now owned by the former Radio Again (although the company retains the name Radio Spirits). As of 2011, When Radio Was appears on over 200 stations in the U.S., as well as one Canadian station, CHPQ-FM in Parksville, British Columbia. The program is also carried on the Radio Classics channel on Sirius XM Satellite Radio and streamed on the Internet. Radio America currently handles syndication of When Radio Was on behalf of Radio Spirits.

For a time in the late 1990s, audio from the show was used by a TV station, Miami's WAMI-69, then embarking on a locally-led programming philosophy; the audio would be heard underneath footage of people at popular neighborhoods in the Miami area, the result was dubbed RadioVision.

=== Hosts ===
Art Fleming continued to host the nationally syndicated version until shortly before his death from cancer in 1995. Satirist Stan Freberg, then writing and hosting "Stan Freberg Here", a syndicated daily commentary for Brescia, replaced Fleming. Freberg continued in the emcee role through the first week of October 2006. For a brief period during the early Freberg years, the show's announcer was the legendary Fred Foy (of The Lone Ranger fame, who would introduce Stan with "Return with us now to those thrilling days of yesteryear, on When Radio Was, with your host, Radio Hall-of-Famer Stan Freberg!")

Veteran Chicago radio personality Chuck Schaden became the next host beginning with the October 9, 2006, episode, "A Salute to Stan Freberg". A recurring feature of this version was "Speaking of Radio...", featuring excerpts from Chuck's historic interviews with many of the stars and "behind the scenes" people responsible for the classic shows (also a feature of Chuck's long-running "Those Were The Days"). It was at this time that the series expanded to seven shows per week (a format which continues with the Greg Bell version).

Illinois native Greg Bell, host and programmer for Sirius XM's Radio Classics channel, became the fourth national host of the series as of October 8, 2007. The longtime When Radio Was theme music, titled "Swing and Sway", has been discontinued with the Bell series.

In addition to opening and closing the show, the host introduces the radio programs, usually mentioning such facts as their original airdates (when available) and incidental trivia.

== Typical programs ==
When Radio Was re-airs a wide variety of old time radio shows, typically pairing a drama and comedy, but the most frequent programs are noted below:

- Westerns: Gunsmoke; Have Gun – Will Travel; Tales of the Texas Rangers; The Lone Ranger.
- Crime Dramas: Dragnet; Gang Busters; The Shadow; The Green Hornet.
- Comedies: Our Miss Brooks; The Great Gildersleeve; The Jack Benny Program; Fibber McGee and Molly; The George Burns & Gracie Allen Show.
- Dramas: Lux Radio Theatre; Campbell Playhouse; Escape; Suspense.
- Private Eyes & Detectives: Yours Truly, Johnny Dollar; The Adventures of Sam Spade; Sherlock Holmes; The Adventures of Philip Marlowe, Boston Blackie.
- Science Fiction: Dimension X; X Minus One.

== See also ==
- List of old-time radio people
- Radio Classics
