= Golden Age of Radio =

Era of popular entertainment in the US centered on radio shows

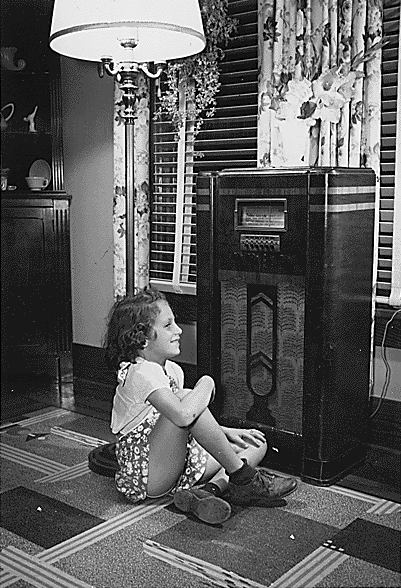
Girl listening to a vacuum tube radio during the Great Depression. Prior to the emergence of television as the dominant entertainment medium in the 1950s, families gathered to listen to the home radio in the evening.

The Golden Age of Radio, also known as the old-time radio (OTR) era, was an era of radio in the United States where it was the dominant electronic home entertainment medium. It began with the birth of commercial radio broadcasting in the early 1920s and lasted through the 1950s, when television superseded radio as the medium of choice for scripted programming, variety and dramatic shows.

Radio was the first broadcast medium, and during this period people regularly tuned in to their favorite radio programs, and families gathered to listen to the home radio in the evening. According to a 1947 C. E. Hooper survey, 82 out of 100 Americans were found to be radio listeners. A variety of new entertainment formats and genres were created for the new medium, many of which later migrated to television: radio plays, mystery serials, soap operas, quiz shows, talent shows, daytime and evening variety hours, situation comedies, play-by-play sports, children's shows, cooking shows, and more.

In the 1950s, television surpassed radio as the most popular broadcast medium, and commercial radio programming shifted to narrower formats of news, talk, sports and music. Religious broadcasters, listener-supported public radio and college stations provide their own distinctive formats.

== Origins ==
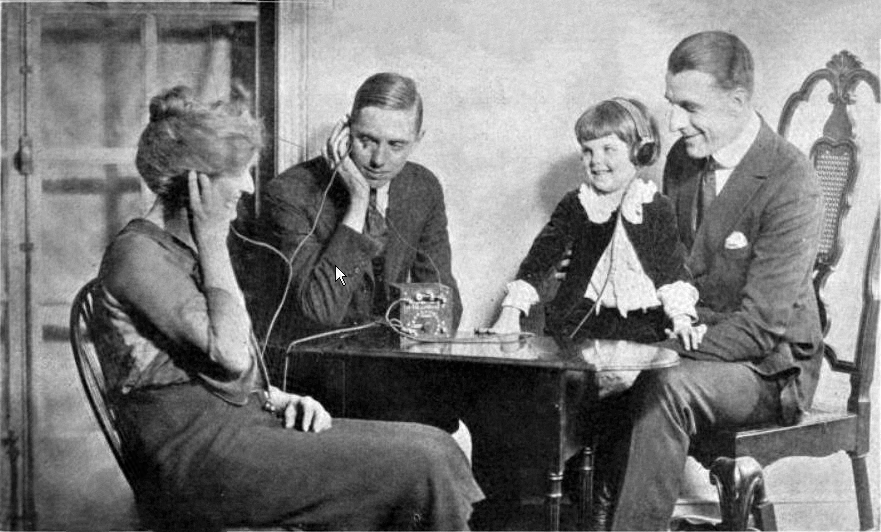
A family listening to the first broadcasts around 1920 with a crystal radio. The crystal radio, a legacy from the pre-broadcast era, could not power a loudspeaker so the family must share earphones.

During the first three decades of radio, from 1887 to about 1920, the technology of transmitting sound was undeveloped; the information-carrying ability of radio waves was the same as a telegraph; the radio signal could be either on or off. Radio communication was by wireless telegraphy; at the sending end, an operator tapped on a switch which caused the radio transmitter to produce a series of pulses of radio waves which spelled out text messages in Morse code. At the receiver these sounded like beeps, requiring an operator who knew Morse code to translate them back to text. This type of radio was used exclusively for person-to-person text communication for commercial, diplomatic and military purposes and hobbyists; broadcasting did not exist.

Transmission of live drama, comedy, music and news that characterize the Golden Age of Radio had a precedent in a small number of telephone newspaper systems, including the Théâtrophone, commercially introduced in Paris in 1890 and available as late as 1932. It allowed subscribers to listen to live stage performances and hear news reports distributed over telephone lines. The development of radio eliminated the wires and subscription charges from this concept.

Between 1900 and 1920 the first technology for transmitting sound by radio was developed, AM (amplitude modulation), and AM broadcasting sprang up around 1920.

Reginald Fessenden reported making, on Christmas Eve, December 24, 1906, the first audio radio broadcast program, consisting of some violin playing and passages from the Bible. While Fessenden's role as an inventor and early radio experimenter is not in dispute, several contemporary radio researchers have questioned whether the Christmas Eve broadcast took place, or whether the date was, in fact, several weeks earlier. The first apparent published reference to the event was made in 1928 by H. P. Davis, Vice President of Westinghouse, in a lecture given at Harvard University. In 1932 Fessenden cited the Christmas Eve 1906 broadcast event in a letter he wrote to Vice President S. M. Kinter of Westinghouse. Fessenden's wife Helen recounts the broadcast in her book Fessenden: Builder of Tomorrows (1940), eight years after Fessenden's death. The issue of whether the 1906 Fessenden broadcast actually happened is discussed in Donna Halper's article "In Search of the Truth About Fessenden" and also in James O'Neal's essays. An annotated argument supporting Fessenden as the world's first radio broadcaster was offered in 2006 by Dr. John S. Belrose, Radioscientist Emeritus at the Communications Research Centre Canada, in his essay "Fessenden's 1906 Christmas Eve broadcast."

It was not until after the Titanic catastrophe in 1912 that radio for mass communication came into vogue, inspired first by the work of amateur ("ham") radio operators. Radio was especially important during World War I as it was vital for air and naval operations. World War I brought about major developments in radio, superseding the Morse code of the wireless telegraph with the vocal communication of the wireless telephone, through advancements in vacuum tube technology and the introduction of the transceiver.

After the war, numerous radio stations were born in the United States and set the standard for later radio programs. The first radio news program was broadcast on August 31, 1920, on the station 8MK in Detroit; owned by The Detroit News, the station covered local election results. This was followed in 1920 with the first commercial radio station in the United States, KDKA, being established in Pittsburgh. The first regular entertainment programs were broadcast in 1922, and on March 10, Variety carried the front-page headline: "Radio Sweeping Country: 1,000,000 Sets in Use." A highlight of this time was the first Rose Bowl Game being broadcast on January 1, 1923, on the Los Angeles station KHJ.

== Growth of radio ==
Broadcast radio in the United States underwent a period of rapid change through the decade of the 1920s. Technology advances, better regulation, rapid consumer adoption, and the creation of broadcast networks transformed radio from a consumer curiosity into the mass media powerhouse that defined the Golden Age of Radio.

=== Consumer adoption ===
Through the decade of the 1920s, the purchase of radios by United States homes continued, and accelerated. The Radio Corporation of America (RCA) released figures in 1925 stating that 19% of United States homes owned a radio. The triode and regenerative circuit made amplified, vacuum tube radios widely available to consumers by the second half of the 1920s. The advantage was obvious: several people at once in a home could now easily listen to their radio at the same time. In 1930, 40% of the nation's households owned a radio, a figure that was much higher in suburban and large metropolitan areas. The superheterodyne receiver and other inventions refined radios even further in the next decade; even as the Great Depression ravaged the country in the 1930s, radio would stay at the center of American life. 83% of American homes would own a radio by 1940.

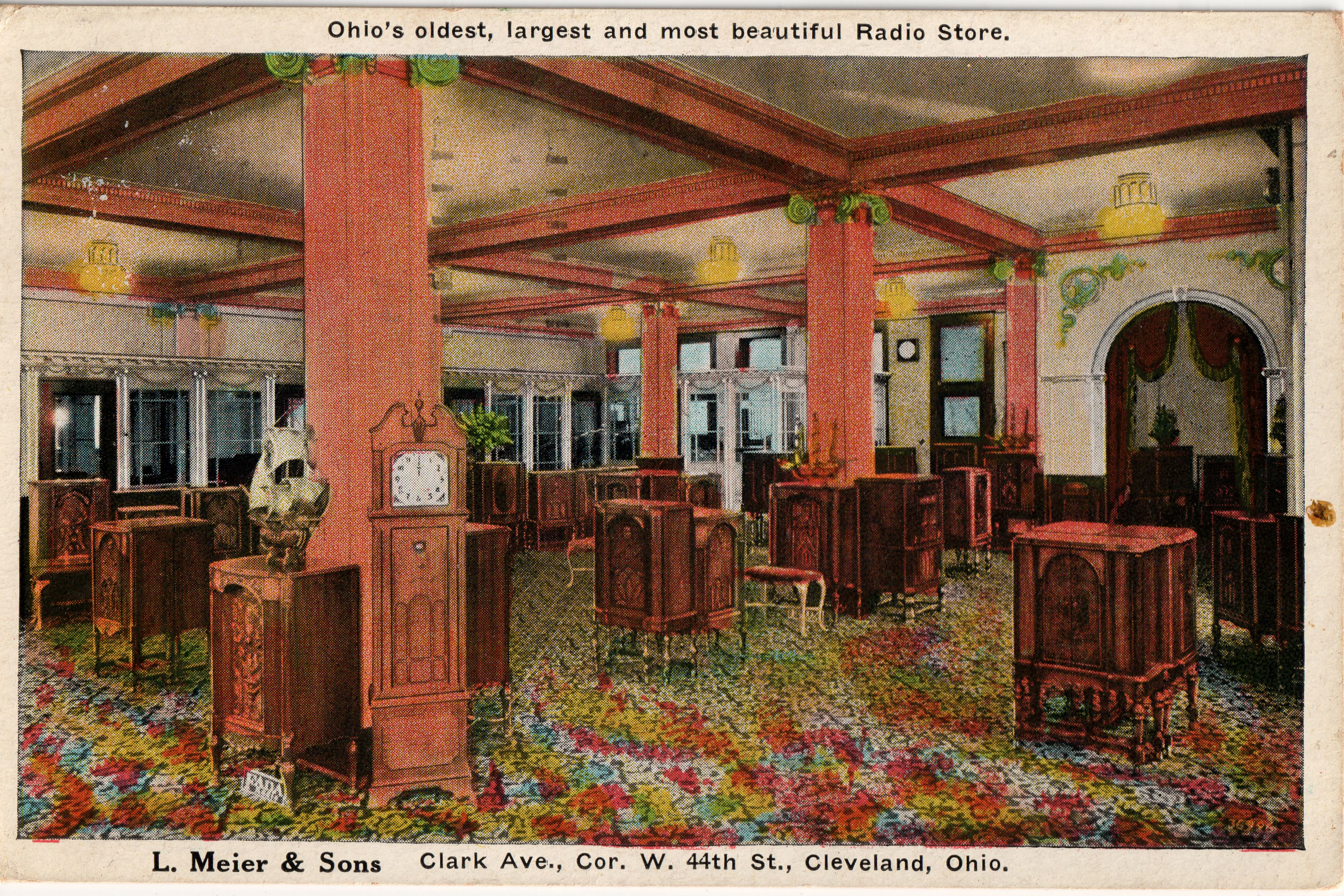
Radios for sale in an Ohio store, 1930s

=== Government regulation ===
Although radio was well established with United States consumers by the mid-1920s, regulation of the broadcast medium presented its own challenges. Until 1926, broadcast radio power and frequency use was regulated by the U.S. Department of Commerce, until a legal challenge rendered the agency powerless to do so. Congress responded by enacting the Radio Act of 1927, which included the formation of the Federal Radio Commission (FRC).

One of the FRC's most important early actions was the adoption of General Order 40, which divided stations on the AM band into three power level categories, which became known as Local, Regional, and Clear Channel, and reorganized station assignments. Based on this plan, effective 3:00 a.m. Eastern time on November 11, 1928, most of the country's stations were assigned to new transmitting frequencies.

=== Broadcast networks ===
The final element needed to make the Golden Age of Radio possible focused on the question of distribution: the ability for multiple radio stations to simultaneously broadcast the same content, and this would be solved with the concept of a radio network. The earliest radio programs of the 1920s were largely unsponsored; radio stations were a service designed to sell radio receivers. In early 1922, American Telephone & Telegraph Company (AT&T) announced the beginning of radio advertisement-supported broadcasting on its owned stations, and plans for the development of the first radio network using its telephone lines to transmit the content. In July 1926, AT&T abruptly decided to exit the broadcasting field, and signed an agreement to sell its entire network operations to a group headed by RCA, which used the assets to form the National Broadcasting Company. Four national radio networks had formed by 1934. These were:

- National Broadcasting Company Red Network (NBC Red), launched November 15, 1926. Originally founded as the National Broadcasting Company in late 1926, the company was almost immediately forced to split under antitrust laws to form NBC Red and NBC Blue. In 1942, when NBC Blue was sold and renamed the Blue Network, the NBC Red network would go back to calling itself simply the National Broadcasting Company Radio Network (NBC).
- National Broadcasting Company Blue Network (NBC Blue); launched January 10, 1927, split from NBC Red. NBC Blue was sold in 1942 and became the Blue Network. In turn, the company transferred its assets to a new company, the American Broadcasting Company on June 15, 1945. That network identified itself as the American Broadcasting Company Radio Network (ABC).
- Columbia Broadcasting System (CBS), launched September 18, 1927. After an initially struggling attempt to compete with the NBC networks, CBS gained new momentum when William S. Paley was installed as company president.
- Mutual Broadcasting System (Mutual), launched September 29, 1934. Mutual was initially run as a cooperative in which the flagship stations owned the network, not the other way around as was the case with the other three radio networks.

However, by the end of the Golden Age (circa 1950), two other national radio networks were in operation alongside the larger four, both of which were short-lived:

- Liberty Broadcasting System (Liberty), launched in 1948. Liberty was founded by American radio broadcaster Gordon McLendon, and broadcast live recreations of Major League Baseball games by following the action via Western Union ticker reports. Hampered by a massive increase in rights fees and severe blackout restrictions on its cornerstone sports broadcasts, the network folded in 1952. McLendon would continue building a network of stations, without a unified brand or program lineup.
- Progressive Broadcasting System (PBS), launched November 26, 1950. PBS's goal was to cater to smaller radio stations that hadn't yet affiliated with NBC, CBS, ABC, or even Mutual or Liberty. It planned to offer programming for 10 hours of the day on member stations. PBS folded January 31, 1951, after only two months on air, due to lack of affiliate signups.

== Programming ==
In the period before and after the advent of the broadcast network, new forms of entertainment needed to be created to fill the time of a station's broadcast day. Many of the formats born in this era continued into the television and digital eras. In the beginning of the Golden Age, network programs were almost exclusively broadcast live, as the national networks prohibited the airing of recorded programs until the late 1940s because of the inferior sound quality of phonograph discs, the only practical recording medium at that time. As a result, network prime-time shows would be performed twice, once for each coast.

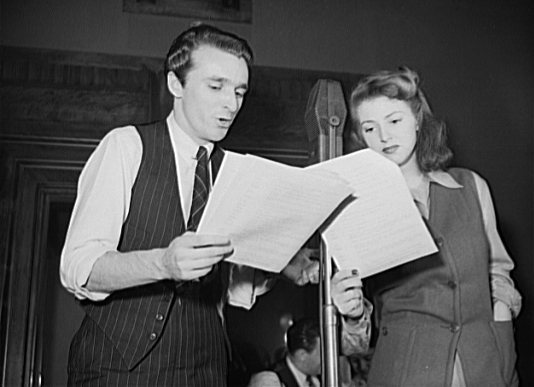
Rehearsal for the World War II radio show You Can't Do Business with Hitler with John Flynn and Virginia Moore. This series of programs, broadcast at least once weekly by more than 790 radio stations in the United States, was written and produced by the radio section of the Office of War Information (OWI).

=== Live events ===
Coverage of live events included musical concerts and play-by-play sports broadcasts.

=== News ===
The capability of the new medium to get information to people created the format of modern radio news: headlines, remote reporting, sidewalk interviews (such as Vox Pop), panel discussions, weather reports, and farm reports. The entry of radio into the realm of news triggered a feud between the radio and newspaper industries in the mid-1930s, eventually culminating in newspapers trumping up exaggerated reports of a mass hysteria from the (entirely fictional) radio presentation of The War of the Worlds, which had been presented as a faux newscast.

=== Musical features ===
The sponsored musical feature soon became one of the most popular program formats. Most early radio sponsorship came in the form of selling the naming rights to the program, as evidenced by such programs as The A&P Gypsies, Champion Spark Plug Hour, The Clicquot Club Eskimos, and King Biscuit Time; commercials, as they are known in the modern era, were still relatively uncommon and considered intrusive. During the 1930s and 1940s, the leading orchestras were heard often through big band remotes, and NBC's Monitor continued such remotes well into the 1950s by broadcasting live music from New York City jazz clubs to rural America. Singers such as Harriet Lee and Wendell Hall became popular fixtures on network radio beginning in the late 1920s and early 1930s. Local stations often had staff organists such as Jesse Crawford playing popular tunes.

Classical music programs on the air included The Voice of Firestone and The Bell Telephone Hour. Texaco sponsored Metropolitan Opera broadcasts; the broadcasts, now sponsored by the Toll Brothers, continue to this day around the world, and are one of the few examples of live classical music still broadcast on radio. One of the most notable of all classical music radio programs of the Golden Age of Radio featured the celebrated Italian conductor Arturo Toscanini conducting the NBC Symphony Orchestra, which had been created especially for him. At that time, nearly all classical musicians and critics considered Toscanini the greatest living maestro. Popular songwriters such as George Gershwin were also featured on radio. (Gershwin, in addition to frequent appearances as a guest, had his own program in 1934.) The New York Philharmonic also had weekly concerts on radio. There was no dedicated classical music radio station at that time, so classical music programs had to share the network they were broadcast on with more popular ones.

Country music also enjoyed popularity. National Barn Dance, begun on Chicago's WLS in 1924, was picked up by NBC Radio in 1933. In 1925, WSM Barn Dance went on the air from Nashville. It was renamed the Grand Ole Opry in 1927 and NBC carried portions from 1944 to 1956. NBC also aired The Red Foley Show from 1951 to 1961, and ABC Radio carried Ozark Jubilee from 1953 to 1961.

=== Comedy ===
Radio attracted top comedy talents from vaudeville and Hollywood for many years: Bing Crosby, Abbott and Costello, Fred Allen, Jack Benny, Victor Borge, Fanny Brice, Billie Burke, Bob Burns, Judy Canova, Eddie Cantor, Jimmy Durante, Burns and Allen, Phil Harris, Edgar Bergen, Bob Hope, Groucho Marx, Jean Shepherd, Red Skelton and Ed Wynn. Situation comedies also gained popularity, such as Amos 'n' Andy, Easy Aces, Ethel and Albert, Fibber McGee and Molly, The Goldbergs, The Great Gildersleeve, The Halls of Ivy (which featured screen star Ronald Colman and his wife Benita Hume), Meet Corliss Archer, Meet Millie, and Our Miss Brooks.

Radio comedy ran the gamut from the small town humor of Lum and Abner, Herb Shriner and Minnie Pearl to the dialect characterizations of Mel Blanc and the caustic sarcasm of Henry Morgan. Popular comedies included Stop Me If You've Heard This One and Can You Top This?, panel programs devoted to the art of telling jokes. Quiz shows were lampooned on It Pays to Be Ignorant, and other memorable parodies were presented by such satirists as Spike Jones, Stoopnagle and Budd, Stan Freberg and Bob and Ray. The British comedy show The Goon Show was carried by NBC in the mid-1950s.

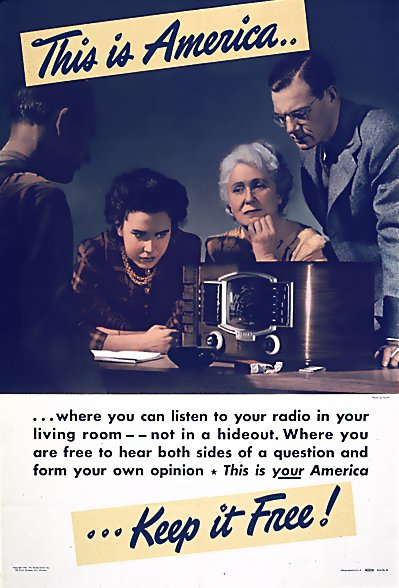
Radio-related World War II propaganda poster

Some shows originated as stage productions: Clifford Goldsmith's play What a Life was reworked into NBC's popular, long-running The Aldrich Family (1939–1953) with the familiar catchphrases "Henry! Henry Aldrich!," followed by Henry's answer, "Coming, Mother!" Moss Hart and George S. Kaufman's Pulitzer Prize-winning Broadway hit, You Can't Take It with You (1936), became a weekly situation comedy heard on Mutual (1944) with Everett Sloane and later on NBC (1951) with Walter Brennan.

Other shows were adapted from comic strips, such as Blondie, Dick Tracy, Gasoline Alley, The Gumps, Li'l Abner, Little Orphan Annie, Popeye the Sailor, Red Ryder, Reg'lar Fellers, Terry and the Pirates and Tillie the Toiler. Bob Montana's redheaded teen of comic strips and comic books was heard on radio's Archie Andrews from 1943 to 1953. The Timid Soul was a 1941–1942 comedy based on cartoonist H. T. Webster's famed Caspar Milquetoast character, and Robert L. Ripley's Believe It or Not! was adapted to several different radio formats during the 1930s and 1940s. Conversely, some radio shows gave rise to spinoff comic strips, such as My Friend Irma starring Marie Wilson.

=== Soap operas ===
The first program generally considered to be a daytime serial drama by scholars of the genre is Painted Dreams, which premiered on WGN on October 20, 1930. The first networked daytime serial is Clara, Lu, 'n Em, which started in a daytime time slot on February 15, 1932. As daytime serials became popular in the early 1930s, they became known as soap operas because many were sponsored by soap products and detergents. On November 25, 1960, the last four daytime radio dramas—Young Dr. Malone, Right to Happiness, The Second Mrs. Burton and Ma Perkins, all broadcast on the CBS Radio Network—were brought to an end.

=== Children's programming ===
The line-up of late afternoon adventure serials included Bobby Benson and the B-Bar-B Riders, The Cisco Kid, Jack Armstrong, the All-American Boy, Captain Midnight, and The Tom Mix Ralston Straight Shooters. Badges, rings, decoding devices and other radio premiums were often linked to a sponsor's product. These items were offered on adventure shows. Young listeners had to mail in a boxtop from a breakfast cereal or other proof of purchase.

=== Radio plays ===
Radio plays were presented on such programs as 26 by Corwin, NBC Short Story, Arch Oboler's Plays, Quiet, Please, and CBS Radio Workshop. Orson Welles's The Mercury Theatre on the Air and The Campbell Playhouse were considered by many critics to be the finest radio drama anthologies ever presented. They usually starred Welles in the leading role, along with celebrity guest stars such as Margaret Sullavan or Helen Hayes, in adaptations from literature, Broadway, and/or films. They included such titles as Liliom, Oliver Twist (a title now feared lost), A Tale of Two Cities, Lost Horizon, and The Murder of Roger Ackroyd. It was on Mercury Theatre that Welles presented his celebrated-but-infamous 1938 adaptation of H. G. Wells's The War of the Worlds, formatted to sound like a breaking news program. Theatre Guild on the Air presented adaptations of classical and Broadway plays. Their Shakespeare adaptations included a one-hour Macbeth starring Maurice Evans and Judith Anderson, and a 90-minute Hamlet, starring John Gielgud. Recordings of many of these programs survive.

During the 1940s, Basil Rathbone and Nigel Bruce, famous for playing Sherlock Holmes and Dr. Watson in films, repeated their characterizations on radio on The New Adventures of Sherlock Holmes, which featured both original stories and episodes directly adapted from Arthur Conan Doyle's stories. None of the episodes in which Rathbone and Bruce starred on the radio program were filmed with the two actors as Holmes and Watson, so radio became the only medium in which audiences were able to experience Rathbone and Bruce appearing in some of the more famous Holmes stories, such as "The Speckled Band". There were also many dramatizations of Sherlock Holmes stories on radio without Rathbone and Bruce.

During the latter part of his career, celebrated actor John Barrymore starred in a radio program, Streamlined Shakespeare, which featured him in a series of one-hour adaptations of Shakespeare plays, many of which Barrymore never appeared in either on stage or in films, such as Twelfth Night (in which he played both Malvolio and Sir Toby Belch), and Macbeth.

Lux Radio Theatre and The Screen Guild Theater presented adaptations of Hollywood movies, performed before a live audience, usually with cast members from the original films. Suspense, Escape, The Mysterious Traveler and Inner Sanctum Mystery were popular thriller anthology series. Leading writers who created original material for radio included Norman Corwin, Carlton E. Morse, David Goodis, Archibald MacLeish, Arthur Miller, Arch Oboler, Wyllis Cooper, Rod Serling, Jay Bennett, and Irwin Shaw.

=== Game shows ===
Game shows saw their beginnings in radio. One of the first was Information Please in 1938, and one of the first major successes was Dr. I.Q. in 1939. Winner Take All, which premiered in 1946, was the first to use lockout devices and feature returning champions.

A relative of the game show, which would be called the giveaway show in contemporary media, typically involved giving sponsored products to studio audience members, people randomly called by telephone, or both. An early example of this show was the 1939 show Pot o' Gold, but the breakout hit of this type was ABC's Stop the Music in 1948. Winning a prize generally required knowledge of what was being aired on the show at that moment, which led to criticism of the giveaway show as a form of "buying an audience". Giveaway shows were extremely popular through 1948 and 1949. They were often panned as low-brow, and an unsuccessful attempt was even made by the FCC to ban them (as an illegal lottery) in August 1949.

== Broadcast production methods ==
The RCA Type 44-BX microphone had two live faces and two dead ones. Thus actors could face each other and react. An actor could give the effect of leaving the room by simply moving their head toward the dead face of the microphone.

The scripts were paper-clipped together. It has been disputed whether or not actors and actresses would drop finished pages to the carpeted floor after use.

== History of professional radio recordings in the United States ==
=== Radio stations ===
Despite a general ban on use of recordings on broadcasts by radio networks through the late 1940s, "reference recordings" on phonograph disc were made of many programs as they were being broadcast, for review by the sponsor and for the network's own archival purposes. With the development of high-fidelity magnetic wire and tape recording in the years following World War II, the networks became more open to airing recorded programs and the prerecording of shows became more common.

Local stations, however, had always been free to use recordings and sometimes made substantial use of prerecorded syndicated programs distributed on pressed (as opposed to individually recorded) transcription discs.

Recording was done using a cutting lathe and acetate discs. Programs were normally recorded at 33 1/3 rpm on 16-inch discs, the standard format used for such "electrical transcriptions" from the early 1930s through the 1950s. Sometimes, the groove was cut starting at the inside of the disc and running to the outside. This was useful when the program to be recorded was longer than 15 minutes so required more than one disc side. By recording the first side outside in, the second inside out, and so on, the sound quality at the disc change-over points would match and result in a more seamless playback. An inside start also had the advantage that the thread of material cut from the disc's surface, which had to be kept out of the path of the cutting stylus, was naturally thrown toward the center of the disc so was automatically out of the way. When cutting an outside start disc, a brush could be used to keep it out of the way by sweeping it toward the middle of the disc. Well-equipped recording lathes used the vacuum from a water aspirator to pick it up as it was cut and deposit it in a water-filled bottle. In addition to convenience, this served a safety purpose, as the cellulose nitrate thread was highly flammable and a loose accumulation of it combusted violently if ignited.

Most recordings of radio broadcasts were made at a radio network's studios, or at the facilities of a network-owned or affiliated station, which might have four or more lathes. A small local station often had none. Two lathes were required to capture a program longer than 15 minutes without losing parts of it while discs were flipped over or changed, along with a trained technician to operate them and monitor the recording while it was being made. However, some surviving recordings were produced by local stations.

When a substantial number of copies of an electrical transcription were required, as for the distribution of a syndicated program, they were produced by the same process used to make ordinary records. A master recording was cut, then electroplated to produce a stamper from which pressings in vinyl (or, in the case of transcription discs pressed before about 1935, shellac) were molded in a record press.

=== Armed Forces Radio Service ===
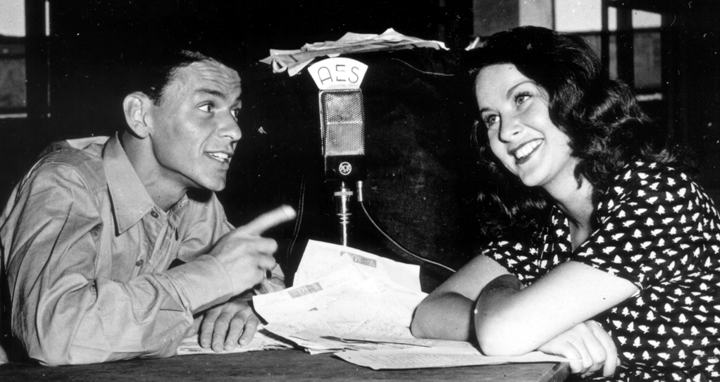
Frank Sinatra and Alida Valli converse over Armed Forces Radio Service during World War II.

The Armed Forces Radio Service (AFRS) had its origins in the U.S. War Department's quest to improve troop morale. This quest began with short-wave broadcasts of educational and information programs to troops in 1940. In 1941, the War Department began issuing "Buddy Kits" (B-Kits) to departing troops, which consisted of radios, 78 rpm records and electrical transcription discs of radio shows. However, with the entrance of the United States into World War II, the War Department decided that it needed to improve the quality and quantity of its offerings.

This began with the broadcasting of its own original variety programs. Command Performance was the first of these, produced for the first time on March 1, 1942. On May 26, 1942, the Armed Forces Radio Service was formally established. Originally, its programming comprised network radio shows with the commercials removed. However, it soon began producing original programming, such as Mail Call, G.I. Journal, Jubilee and GI Jive. At its peak in 1945, the Service produced around 20 hours of original programming each week.

From 1943 until 1949 the AFRS also broadcast programs developed through the collaborative efforts of the Office of the Coordinator of Inter-American Affairs and the Columbia Broadcasting System's Network of the Americas in support of America's cultural diplomacy initiatives and President Franklin Roosevelt's Good Neighbor policy. Included among the popular shows was Viva America which showcased leading musical artists from both North and South America for the entertainment of America's troops. Included among the regular performers were: Alfredo Antonini, Juan Arvizu, Nestor Mesta Chayres, Kate Smith, and John Serry Sr.

After the war, the AFRS continued providing programming to troops in Europe. During the 1950s and early 1960s it presented performances by the Army's only symphonic orchestra ensemble—the Seventh Army Symphony Orchestra. It also provided programming for future wars that the United States was involved in. It survives today as a component of the American Forces Network (AFN).

All of the shows aired by the AFRS during the Golden Age were recorded as electrical transcription discs, vinyl copies of which were shipped to stations overseas to be broadcast to the troops. People in the United States rarely ever heard programming from the AFRS, though AFRS recordings of Golden Age network shows were occasionally broadcast on some domestic stations beginning in the 1950s.

In some cases, the AFRS disc is the only surviving recording of a program.

=== Home radio recordings in the United States ===
There was some home recording of radio broadcasts in the 1930s and 1940s. Examples from as early as 1930 have been documented. During these years, home recordings were made with disc recorders, most of which were only capable of storing about four minutes of a radio program on each side of a twelve-inch 78 rpm record. Most home recordings were made on even shorter-playing ten-inch or smaller discs. Some home disc recorders offered the option of the 33 1/3 rpm speed used for electrical transcriptions, allowing a recording more than twice as long to be made, although with reduced audio quality. Office dictation equipment was sometimes pressed into service for making recordings of radio broadcasts, but the audio quality of these devices was poor and the resulting recordings were in odd formats that had to be played back on similar equipment. Due to the expense of recorders and the limitations of the recording media, home recording of broadcasts was not common during this period and it was usually limited to brief excerpts.

The lack of suitable home recording equipment was somewhat relieved in 1947 with the availability of magnetic wire recorders for domestic use. These were capable of recording an hour-long broadcast on a single small spool of wire, and if a high-quality radio's audio output was recorded directly, rather than by holding a microphone up to its speaker, the recorded sound quality was very good. However, because the wire cost money and, like magnetic tape, could be repeatedly re-used to make new recordings, only a few complete broadcasts appear to have survived on this medium. In fact, there was little home recording of complete radio programs until the early 1950s, when increasingly affordable reel-to-reel tape recorders for home use were introduced to the market.

== Recording media ==
=== Electrical transcription discs ===
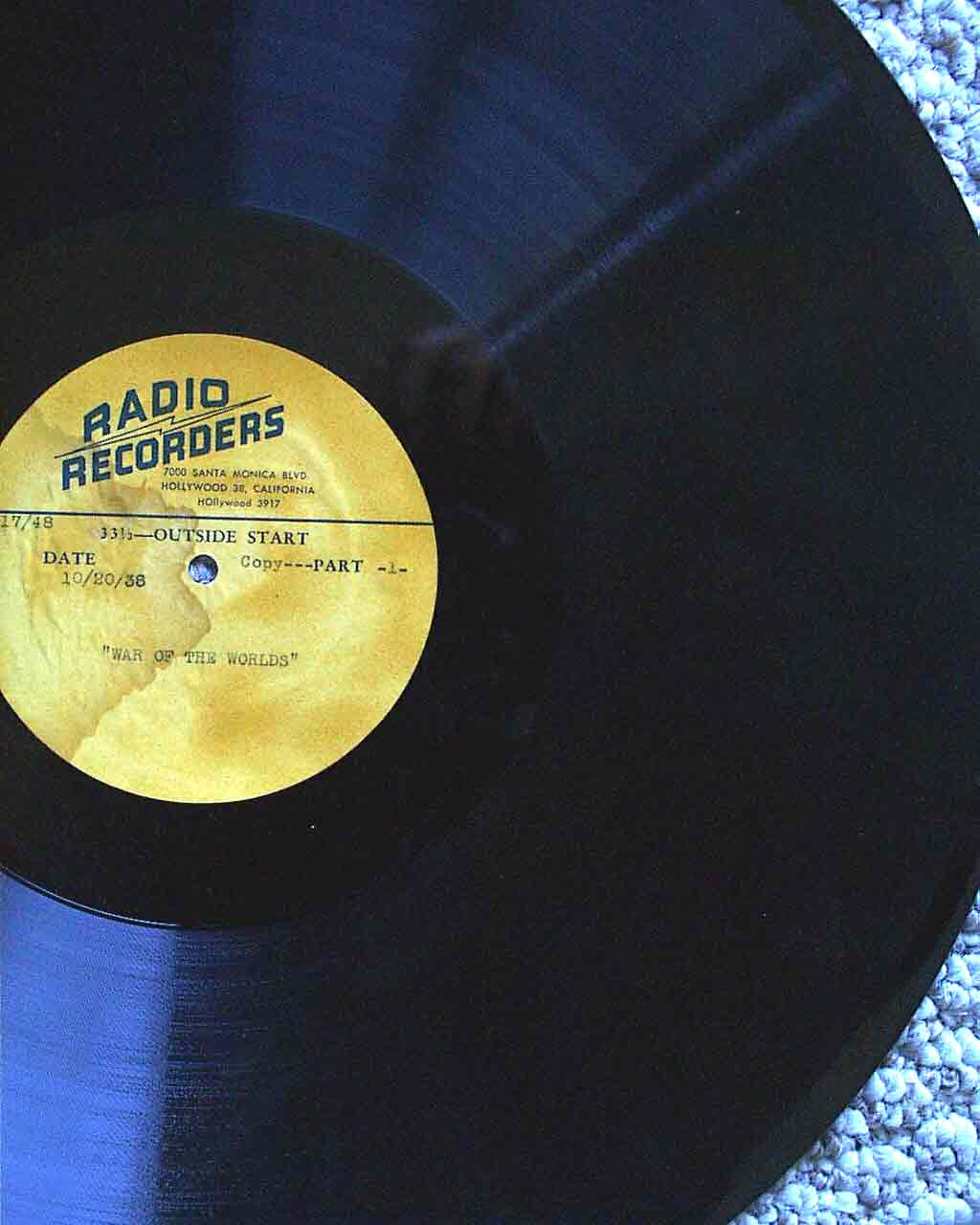
The War of the Worlds radio broadcast by Orson Welles on electrical transcription disc

Before the early 1950s, when radio networks and local stations wanted to preserve a live broadcast, they did so by means of special phonograph records known as "electrical transcriptions" (ETs), made by cutting a sound-modulated groove into a blank disc. At first, in the early 1930s, the blanks varied in both size and composition, but most often they were simply bare aluminum and the groove was indented rather than cut. Typically, these very early recordings were not made by the network or radio station, but by a private recording service contracted by the broadcast sponsor or one of the performers. The bare aluminum discs were typically 10 or 12 inches in diameter and recorded at the then-standard speed of 78 rpm, which meant that several disc sides were required to accommodate even a 15-minute program. By about 1936, 16-inch aluminum-based discs coated with cellulose nitrate lacquer, commonly known as acetates and recorded at a speed of 33 1/3 rpm, had been adopted by the networks and individual radio stations as the standard medium for recording broadcasts. The making of such recordings, at least for some purposes, then became routine. Some discs were recorded using a "hill and dale" vertically modulated groove, rather than the "lateral" side-to-side modulation found on the records being made for home use at that time. The large slow-speed discs could easily contain fifteen minutes on each side, allowing an hour-long program to be recorded on only two discs. The lacquer was softer than shellac or vinyl and wore more rapidly, allowing only a few playbacks with the heavy pickups and steel needles then in use before deterioration became audible.

During World War II, aluminum became a necessary material for the war effort and was in short supply. This caused an alternative to be sought for the base on which to coat the lacquer. Glass, despite its obvious disadvantage of fragility, had occasionally been used in earlier years because it could provide a perfectly smooth and even supporting surface for mastering and other critical applications. Glass base recording blanks came into general use for the duration of the war.

=== Magnetic wire recording ===
In the late 1940s, wire recorders became a readily obtainable means of recording radio programs. On a per-minute basis, it was less expensive to record a broadcast on wire than on discs. The one-hour program that required the four sides of two 16-inch discs could be recorded intact on a single spool of wire less than three inches in diameter and about half an inch thick. The audio fidelity of a good wire recording was comparable to acetate discs and by comparison the wire was practically indestructible, but it was soon rendered obsolete by the more manageable and easily edited medium of magnetic tape.

=== Reel-to-reel tape recording ===
Bing Crosby became the first major proponent of magnetic tape recording for radio, and he was the first to use it on network radio, after he did a demonstration program in 1947. Tape had several advantages over earlier recording methods. Running at a sufficiently high speed, it could achieve higher fidelity than both electrical transcription discs and magnetic wire. Discs could be edited only by copying parts of them to a new disc, and the copying entailed a loss of audio quality. Wire could be divided up and the ends spliced together by knotting, but wire was difficult to handle and the crude splices were too noticeable. Tape could be edited by cutting it with a blade and neatly joining ends together with adhesive tape. By early 1949, the transition from live performances preserved on discs to performances prerecorded on magnetic tape for later broadcast was complete for network radio programs. However, for the physical distribution of prerecorded programming to individual stations, 16-inch 33 1/3 rpm vinyl pressings, less expensive to produce in quantities of identical copies than tapes, continued to be standard throughout the 1950s.

== Availability of recordings ==
The great majority of pre-World War II live radio broadcasts are lost. Many were never recorded; few recordings predate the early 1930s. Beginning then several of the longer-running radio dramas have their archives complete or nearly complete. The earlier the date, the less likely it is that a recording survives. However, a good number of syndicated programs from this period have survived because copies were distributed far and wide. Recordings of live network broadcasts from the World War II years were preserved in the form of pressed vinyl copies issued by the Armed Forces Radio Service (AFRS) and survive in relative abundance. Syndicated programs from World War II and later years have nearly all survived. The survival of network programming from this time frame is more inconsistent; the networks started prerecording their formerly live shows on magnetic tape for subsequent network broadcast, but did not physically distribute copies, and the expensive tapes, unlike electrical transcription ("ET") discs, could be "wiped" and re-used (especially since, in the age of emerging trends such as television and music radio, such recordings were believed to have virtually no rerun or resale value). Thus, while some prime time network radio series from this era exist in full or almost in full, especially the most famous and longest-lived of them, less prominent or shorter-lived series (such as serials) may have only a handful of extant episodes. Airchecks, off-the-air recordings of complete shows made by, or at the behest of, individuals for their own private use, sometimes help to fill in such gaps. The contents of privately made recordings of live broadcasts from the first half of the 1930s can be of particular interest, as little live material from that period survives. Unfortunately, the sound quality of very early private recordings is often very poor, although in some cases this is largely due to the use of an incorrect playback stylus, which can also badly damage some unusual types of discs.

Most of the Golden Age programs in circulation among collectors—whether on analog tape, CD, or in the form of MP3s—originated from analog 16-inch transcription disc, although some are off-the-air AM recordings. But in many cases, the circulating recordings are corrupted (decreased in quality), because lossless digital recording for the home market did not come until the very end of the twentieth century.

Collectors made and shared recordings on analog magnetic tapes, the only practical, relatively inexpensive medium, first on reels, then cassettes. "Sharing" usually meant making a duplicate tape. They connected two recorders, playing on one and recording on the other. Analog recordings are never perfect, and copying an analog recording multiplies the imperfections. With the oldest recordings this can even mean it went out the speaker of one machine and in via the microphone of the other. The muffled sound, dropouts, sudden changes in sound quality, unsteady pitch, and other defects heard all too often are almost always accumulated tape copy defects. In addition, magnetic recordings, unless preserved archivally, are gradually damaged by the Earth's magnetic field.

The audio quality of the source discs, when they have survived unscathed and are accessed and dubbed anew, is usually found to be reasonably clear and undistorted, sometimes startlingly good, although like all phonograph records they are vulnerable to wear and the effects of scuffs, scratches, and ground-in dust. Many shows from the 1940s have survived only in edited AFRS versions, although some exist in both the original and AFRS forms.

As of 2020, the Old Time Radio collection at the Internet Archive contains 5,121 recordings. An active group of collectors makes digitally available, via CD or download, large collections of programs. RadioEchoes.com offers 98,949 episodes in their collection, but not all is old-time radio.

=== Copyright status ===
Unlike film, television, and print items from the era, the copyright status of most recordings from the Golden Age of Radio is unclear. This is because, before 1972, the United States delegated copyright protection of sound recordings to the individual states, many of which offered more generous common law copyright protections than the federal government offered for other media (some offered perpetual copyright, which has since been abolished; under the Music Modernization Act of September 2018, any sound recording 95 years old or older will be thrust into the public domain regardless of state law). The only exceptions are AFRS original productions, which are considered work of the United States government and thus both ineligible for federal copyright and outside the jurisdiction of any state; these programs are firmly in the public domain (this does not apply to programs carried by AFRS but produced by commercial networks).

In practice, most old-time radio recordings are treated as orphan works: although there may still be a valid copyright on the program, it is seldom enforced. The copyright on an individual sound recording is distinct from the federal copyright for the underlying material (such as a published script, music, or in the case of adaptations, the original film or television material), and in many cases it is impossible to determine where or when the original recording was made or if the recording was copyrighted in that state. The U.S. Copyright Office states "there are a variety of legal regimes governing protection of pre-1972 sound recordings in the various states, and the scope of protection and of exceptions and limitations to that protection is unclear." For example, New York has issued contradicting rulings on whether or not common law exists in that state; the most recent ruling, 2016's Flo & Eddie, Inc. v. Sirius XM Radio, holds that there is no such copyright in New York in regard to public performance. Further complicating matters is that certain examples in case law have implied that radio broadcasts (and faithful reproductions thereof), because they were distributed freely to the public over the air, may not be eligible for copyright in and of themselves. The Internet Archive and other organizations that distribute public domain and open-source audio recordings maintain extensive archives of old-time radio programs.

== Legacy ==
=== United States ===
Although the Golden Age of Radio is generally considered to have ended in the 1950s with the rise of television, radio continued to evolve and remain a significant medium in the 1960s. The decade saw the growth of FM radio, which offered better sound quality and attracted listeners with its music and talk show formats. Notable events included the first presidential debate broadcast on both radio and television in 1960, and the debut of the first locally produced talk radio show, 'At Your Service,' from KMOX in St. Louis, Missouri, which helped launch the talk radio format in the United States.

Some old-time radio shows continued on the air, although in ever-dwindling numbers, throughout the 1950s, even after their television equivalents had conquered the general public. One factor which helped to kill off old-time radio entirely was the evolution of popular music (including the development of rock and roll), which led to the birth of the top 40 radio format. A top 40 show could be produced in a small studio in a local station with minimal staff. This displaced full-service network radio and hastened the end of the golden-age era of radio drama by 1962. (Radio as a broadcast medium would survive, thanks in part to the proliferation of the transistor radio, and permanent installation in vehicles, making the medium far more portable than television.) Full-service stations that did not adopt either top 40 or the mellower beautiful music or MOR formats eventually developed all-news radio in the mid-1960s.

Scripted radio comedy and drama in the vein of old-time radio has a limited presence on U.S. radio. Several radio theatre series are still in production in the United States, usually airing on Sunday nights. These include original series such as Imagination Theater and a radio adaptation of The Twilight Zone TV series, as well as rerun compilations such as the popular daily series When Radio Was and USA Radio Network's Golden Age of Radio Theatre, and weekly programs such as The Big Broadcast on WAMU, hosted by Murray Horwitz. These shows usually air in late nights and/or on weekends on small AM stations. Carl Amari's nationally syndicated radio show Hollywood 360 features 5 old-time radio episodes each week during his 5-hour broadcast. Amari's show is heard on 100+ radio stations coast-to-coast and in 168 countries on American Forces Radio. Local rerun compilations are also heard, primarily on public radio stations. Sirius XM Radio maintains a full-time Radio Classics channel devoted to rebroadcasts of vintage radio shows.

Starting in 1974, Garrison Keillor, through his syndicated two-hour-long program A Prairie Home Companion, has provided a living museum of the production, tone and listener's experience of this era of radio for several generations after its demise. Produced live in theaters throughout the country, using the same sound effects and techniques of the era, it ran through 2016 with Keillor as host. The program included segments that were close renditions (in the form of parody) of specific genres of this era, including Westerns ("Dusty and Lefty, The Lives of the Cowboys"), detective procedurals ("Guy Noir, Private Eye") and even advertising through fictional commercials. Keillor also wrote a novel, WLT: A Radio Romance based on a radio station of this era—including a personally narrated version for the ultimate in verisimilitude. Upon Keillor's retirement, replacement host Chris Thile chose to reboot the show (since renamed Live from Here after the syndicator cut ties with Keillor) and eliminate much of the old-time radio trappings of the format; the show was ultimately canceled in 2020 due to financial and logistics problems.

Vintage shows and new audio productions in America are accessible more widely from recordings or by satellite and web broadcasters, rather than over conventional AM and FM radio. The National Audio Theatre Festival is a national organization and yearly conference keeping the audio arts—especially audio drama—alive, and continues to involve long-time voice actors and OTR veterans in its ranks. Its predecessor, the Midwest Radio Theatre Workshop, was first hosted by Jim Jordan, of Fibber McGee and Molly fame, and Norman Corwin advised the organization.

One of the longest running radio programs celebrating this era is The Golden Days of Radio, which was hosted on the Armed Forces Radio Service for more than 20 years and overall for more than 50 years by Frank Bresee, who also played "Little Beaver" on the Red Ryder program as a child actor.

One of the very few still-running shows from the earlier era of radio is a Christian program entitled Unshackled! The weekly half-hour show, produced in Chicago by Pacific Garden Mission, has been continuously broadcast since 1950. The shows are created using techniques from the 1950s (including home-made sound effects) and are broadcast across the U.S. and around the world by thousands of radio stations.

Today, radio performers of the past appear at conventions that feature re-creations of classic shows, as well as music, memorabilia and historical panels. The largest of these events was the Friends of Old Time Radio Convention, held in Newark, New Jersey, which held its final convention in October 2011 after 36 years. Others include REPS in Seattle (June), SPERDVAC in California, the Cincinnati OTR & Nostalgia Convention (April), and the Mid-Atlantic Nostalgia Convention (September). Veterans of the Friends of Old Time Radio Convention, including Chairperson Steven M. Lewis of The Gotham Radio Players, Maggie Thompson, publisher of the Comic Book Buyer's Guide, Craig Wichman of audio drama troupe Quicksilver Audio Theater and long-time FOTR Publicist Sean Dougherty have launched a successor event, Celebrating Audio Theater – Old & New, scheduled for October 12–13, 2012.

Radio dramas from the golden age are sometimes recreated as live stage performances at such events. One such group, led by director Daniel Smith, has been performing re-creations of old-time radio dramas at Fairfield University's Regina A. Quick Center for the Arts since the year 2000.

The 40th anniversary of what is widely considered the end of the old time radio era (the final broadcasts of Yours Truly, Johnny Dollar and Suspense on September 30, 1962) was marked with a commentary on NPR's All Things Considered.

A handful of radio programs from the old-time era remain in production, all from the genres of news, music, or religious broadcasting: the Grand Ole Opry (1925), Music and the Spoken Word (1929), The Lutheran Hour (1930), the CBS World News Roundup (1938, slated to end in 2026), King Biscuit Time (1941) and the Renfro Valley Gatherin' (1943). Of those, all but the Opry maintain their original short-form length of 30 minutes or less. The Wheeling Jamboree counts an earlier program on a competing station as part of its history, tracing its lineage back to 1933.

Western revival/comedy act Riders in the Sky produced a radio serial Riders Radio Theater in the 1980s and 1990s and continues to provide sketch comedy on existing radio programs including the Grand Ole Opry, Midnite Jamboree and WoodSongs Old-Time Radio Hour.

=== Elsewhere ===
Regular broadcasts of radio plays are also heard in—among other countries—Australia, Croatia, Estonia, France, Germany, Ireland, Japan, New Zealand, Norway, Romania, and Sweden. In the United Kingdom, such scripted radio drama continues on BBC Radio 3 and (principally) BBC Radio 4, the second-most popular radio station in the country, as well as on the rerun channel BBC Radio 4 Extra, which is the seventh-most popular station there.

== Museums ==
- SPARK Museum of Electrical Invention
- Museum of Broadcast Communications
- Paley Center for Media
- Pavek Museum of Broadcasting

== See also ==
- List of old-time radio programs
- List of old-time American radio people
- List of U.S. radio programs
- List of radio soap operas
- List of radios – List of specific models of radios
- Antique radio
- Audio theater
- Music radio
- Radio comedy
- Radio Days (Woody Allen film dramatizing old-time radio)
- Radio drama
- Remember WENN (AMC television series set at an old-time radio station in Pittsburgh)
- Soap opera
- When Radio Was
