= Radio Classics =

American radio network

- Broadcast area: United States; Canada
- Frequency: Sirius XM Radio 148

Programming
- Format: Old-time radio

Ownership
- Owner: RSPT LLC

History
- First air date: 2002

Technical information
- Class: Satellite Radio Station

Links
- Website: www.siriusxm.com/radioclassics

Radio Classics is a US old time radio network owned by RSPT LLC. It provides the programming content for Sirius XM Radio's 24-hour satellite radio channel of the same name. Radio Classics also syndicates the Radio Spirits-branded program When Radio Was to over 200 terrestrial radio stations. Radio Classics has a monthly online subscription service, providing subscribers with unlimited streaming and twenty hours per month of downloads of old time radio shows that have appeared on past When Radio Was, Radio Super Heroes, Radio Movie Classics, or Radio Hall of Fame (special edition of When Radio Was that focuses on National Radio Hall of Fame inductees) installments.

Shows broadcast by Radio Classics include The Jack Benny Program, Abbott & Costello, Gunsmoke, The Mysterious Traveler, and The Shadow. Hard-boiled noir detectives such as Philip Marlowe, Richard Diamond, and Johnny Dollar are also featured.

The Sirius XM channel, carried on channel 148 on XM (where it was on channel 164) and Sirius (where it was on channel 118), is hosted by Greg Bell, who had previous radio experience as a program director, news director, sports director, anchor, and reporter. Shows are played in two-hour blocks of programming which are rotated in different time slots during the week. This allows the audience in various time zones to be able to hear a show at convenient times. Commercials and Sirius XM promos are played before, after and during the old radio shows, though the amount of advertising time does not exceed eight minutes per hour. Occasionally, the original vintage commercials are broadcast, though the majority of the spots are modern commercials provided by Sirius XM and/or their sponsors.

Prior to February 1, 2009, XM and Sirius had separate Radio Classics channels, with different programming on each. They were combined as part of the larger merger between the two satellite radio services.
