= Little Orphan Annie (radio series) =

American radio drama series

- Genre: Children's radio serial
- Running time: 15 minutes
- Country of origin: United States
- Language: English
- Syndicates: NBC radio
- Starring: Shirley Bell Cole, etc.
- Announcer: Pierre Andre
- Written by: Frank Dahm, Roland Martini, Wally Norman, Ferrin Fraser, Day Keene.
- Directed by: Alan Wallace
- Original release: 1930 – April 26, 1942
- Sponsored by: Ovaltine (1930-1940); Quaker Puffed Wheat (1940-1942)

Little Orphan Annie is an American radio drama series based on the popularity of the comic strip Little Orphan Annie. It debuted on Chicago's WGN in 1930, then moved to the NBC radio network Blue Network on April 6, 1931. It aired until April 26, 1942.

Together with Skippy (1932–1935) it is seen as the oldest US children's radio program. Radio historian Jim Harmon attributes the show's popularity in The Great Radio Heroes to the fact that it was the only radio show to deal with and appeal to young children.

== Concept ==
Little Orphan Annie was based on Harold Gray's eponymous and equally popular comic strip series Little Orphan Annie. The show debuted on WGN/Chicago in 1930, but only became a national hit when it moved to NBC radio's Blue Network in 1931. It was broadcast in the late afternoon and ran for twelve successful years.

In 1931, when the show debuted, radio had yet to establish coast-to-coast networks so two separate casts performed—one in San Francisco starring Floy Margaret Hughes and the other in Chicago starring Shirley Bell as Annie, Stanley Andrews as "Daddy", and Allan Baruck (and later Mel Tormé) as Joe Corntassel. When coast to coast networking was established in 1933, the Chicago cast became the permanent one.

== Merchandising ==
The show was initially sponsored by Ovaltine, a flavored milk supplement, and its scripts were written by Ovaltine's Chicago ad agency staff. They shunned the overt political themes of Gray's newspaper strips and concentrated instead on pitching Ovaltine, using almost seven minutes of each broadcast to do so. Fans could redeem Ovaltine proofs of purchase for a secret decoder badge that decoded brief messages airing in the last moments of the show. Contrary to Jean Shepherd's assertions, the messages were never advertisements for Ovaltine, but were usually related to the following episode. In 1940, Quaker Puffed Wheat Sparkies became the show's sponsor and brought fictional aviator Captain Sparks to the show. Sparks eventually became the star, relegating Annie to secondary player.

The show featured product placement and exploitation of premiums to retain and attract new listeners. Among those items were secret decoders, shake-up mugs for drinking Ovaltine (the show's sponsor product) and secret decoder rings for the Little Orphan Annie secret society. The 1934 fan club's member's handbook included a simple substitution cipher with a resulting numeric cipher text. This was followed the next year with a membership badge or pin that included a cipher disk - enciphering the letters A-Z to numbers 1-26. Announcer Pierre Andre often talked about the virtues of the shows' products, sometimes stretching towards three minutes in length.

== Cast ==
- Annie - Shirley Bell Cole (Bobbe Deane briefly played the part between 1934 and 1935 during a contract dispute involving Shirley Bell. Between 1940 and 1942 Janice Gilbert performed the role.)
- Mr. Silo - Jerry O'Mera
- Mrs. Silo - Henriette Tedro
- Joe Corntassel - Allan Baruck (later Mel Tormé)
- Oliver "Daddy" Warbucks - Henry Saxe, Boris Aplon, Stanley Andrews
- Punjab - Quentin Young
- Sandy the dog - Brad Barker

== Theme song ==
The theme song was sung by announcer Pierre Andre, as "Uncle Andy", or Lawrence Salerno, who was a WGN staff baritone who appeared on various musical programs on the station. Leonard Salvo was the show's organist.

Who's that little chatter box?

The one with pretty auburn locks?

Whom do you see?

It's Little Orphan Annie.

She and Sandy make a pair,

They never seem to have a care!

Cute little she,

This Little Orphan Annie.

Bright eyes cheeks a rosy glow,

There's a store of healthiness handy.

Mite-size, always on the go,

If you want to know - "Arf", says Sandy.

Always wears a sunny smile,

Now, wouldn't it be worth the while,

If you could be,

Like Little Orphan Annie?

== In popular culture ==
Jean Shepherd used the show as the basis for his short story "The Counterfeit Secret Circle Member Gets the Message, or The Asp Strikes Again". In the story, first-person narrator Ralphie Parker is an avid listener of the program and eagerly awaits the arrival of his decoder ring to find out the secret messages in each episode. When the ring arrives, he anxiously decodes the secret message in that day's episode, only to be disappointed when it turns out to be an Ovaltine commercial.

The short story was included in Shepherd's compilation book In God We Trust: All Others Pay Cash, and the story was also adapted as one of the scenes in the 1983 film A Christmas Story.

== Legacy ==
As with most daily radio serials, very few recordings of the series' thousands of episodes survive. The Internet Archive has 38 15-minute recordings in its Old-Time Radio collection.

In 1990 the show was inducted in the National Radio Hall of Fame.

In 1995, Shirley Bell Cole was heard in a reenactment of Little Orphan Annie on Chuck Schaden's Those Were the Days radio show.
