= Stoopnagle and Budd =

American radio comedy team

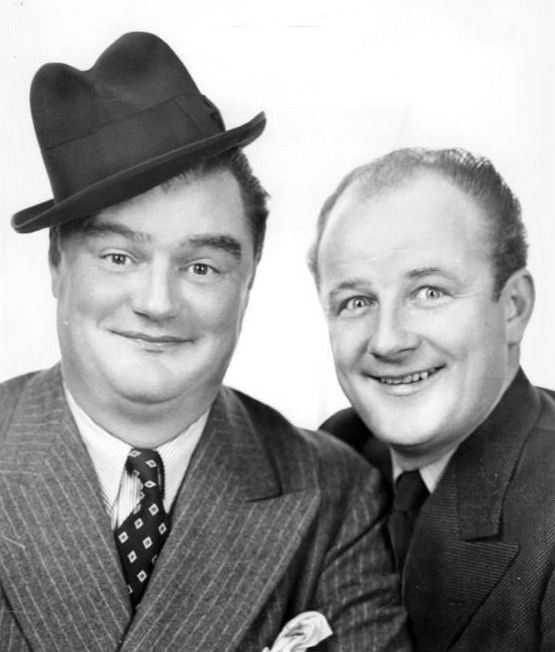
Stoopnagle (left) and Budd in an NBC publicity photo, 1936

Stoopnagle and Budd were a popular radio comedy team of the 1930s, who are sometimes cited as forerunners of the Bob and Ray style of radio comedy. Along with Raymond Knight (The Cuckoo Hour), they were radio's first satirists.

Frederick Chase Taylor (October 4, 1897 – May 28, 1950) was Stoopnagle. The great-grandson of British-born Aaron Lovecraft of Rochester, New York, and a second cousin once removed of author H. P. Lovecraft, he was related to Chief Justice Salmon P. Chase. Taylor was born in Buffalo, New York; he attended the University of Rochester and served in the U. S. Naval Reserve. Taylor seldom used his given name and was usually addressed by his middle name; he signed his name F. Chase Taylor. As a young man, Taylor had worked in his father Horace Taylor's lumber business, and entered the world of finance while in his twenties. He was a vice president in a Buffalo brokerage but he had always found the pressures of business to be stifling, and he became interested in radio. He kept his brokerage job while working nights for Buffalo station WMAK (now WBEN).

Wilbur Budd Hulick (November 14, 1905 – March 22, 1961) was Budd. Like Taylor, Hulick used his middle name, which he adopted as a stage name. He was born in Asbury Park, New Jersey. He graduated from Georgetown University in 1929 and joined bandleader Johnny Johnson as vocalist. The engagement was short-lived; the adverse business conditions of 1929–30 forced the orchestra to disband temporarily, and Hulick then worked for a telegraph company until his department "was wiped out". Hulick took a job as a drugstore soda jerk, and his running patter for his customers amused a radio executive in Buffalo, New York, who hired Hulick on the spot.

== Radio ==
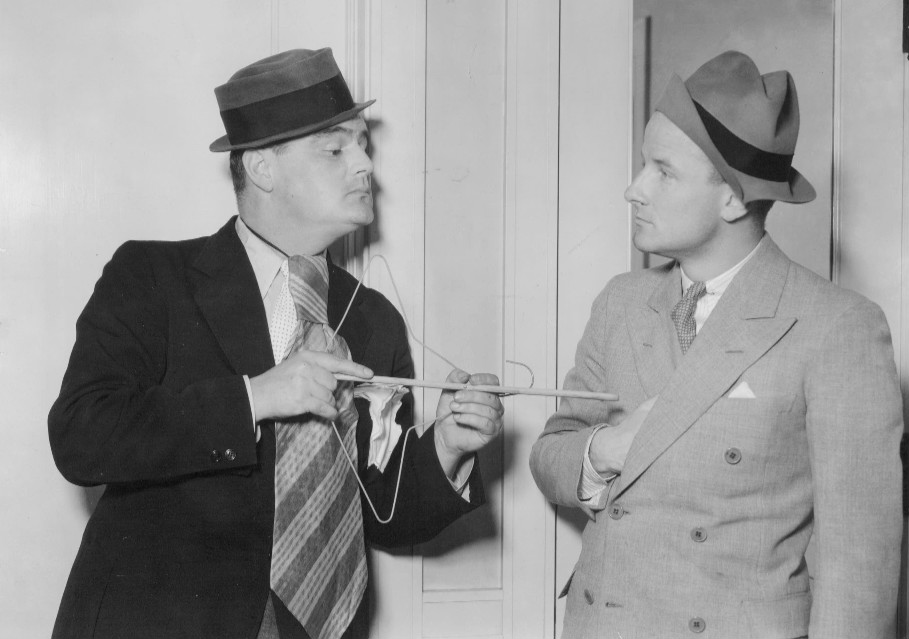
Stoopnagle and Budd in 1932

Both Hulick and Taylor were working as staff announcers for WMAK in Buffalo. They came together as a team on the morning of October 10, 1930, when a transmitter failure kept the station from receiving the scheduled network programming. Hulick, then on the air, rushed into the corridor, found Taylor, and asked him to help fill the air time. Taylor grabbed a portable organ, and Hulick and Taylor took the microphone for the next 23 minutes, delivering a barrage of spontaneous, impromptu patter. Hulick addressed Taylor as "Colonel Stoopnagle" while Taylor played "I Love Coffee, I Love Tea" and other selections on the organ. The audience responded with so much enthusiasm that the duo's goofiness became a regular half-hour feature on WMAK. Taylor and Hulick, known variously as either "Stoopnagle and Budd", "The Colonel and Budd", or "The Gloom Chasers", generated such local interest that they moved to WMAK's sister station WKBW for a primetime evening slot, for two reasons according to Taylor: their morning show couldn't be heard by businessmen at work, and these same businessmen complained that it kept their wives from their housekeeping. Within a year they were headed for New York City. Taylor resigned his vice presidency at the brokerage in 1931 to devote himself to show business full time.

The Gloom Chasers went national on the CBS network on May 24, 1931, sponsored by Tastyeast candy bars. Taylor, spouting Spoonerisms, became known under the full name Colonel Lemuel Q. Stoopnagle as the partners appeared in several different formats on CBS, including some early, experimental television broadcasts, creating a variety of voices for their crazy characters, addlepated antics, and wacky interviews. Typical of the Colonel's whimsical remarks: "If it weren't for half the people in the United States, the other half would be all of them", "Stoopnocracy is peachy", and "People have more fun than anybody". The announcer on their early 1930s shows was Louis Dean (1874–1933).

For many years a rumor circulated that novelist Robert Bloch was a scriptwriter for the program, but Bloch stated that he only sold the team a few gags shortly after he graduated from high school.

NBC president Pat Weaver recalled how the two zanies "used to come into my office and, while we talked, lick my supply of stamps, one after another, and flip them up to stick on the ceiling. There was a knack to it that I never mastered, but they carried it off with amazing success. By the end of the summer my ceiling was virtually papered with stamps."

The Minute Men (1936–37) was sponsored by General Foods' Minute Tapioca.

== Film ==
Stoopnagle and Budd made five appearances in motion pictures, all filmed in New York. The first two were filmed at the Vitaphone studio in Brooklyn: Rambling 'Round Radio Row #1 (1932), and a two-reel musical comedy Sky Symphony (1933). They filmed a brief segment for Paramount with the Colonel demonstrating his newest inventions, including "a revolving goldfish bowl for tired goldfish". It was thought that this sequence had been intended for one of the studio's Hollywood on Parade shorts, but it was in fact filmed especially for the all-star feature film International House (1933). Director Eddie Sutherland flew from Hollywood to New York to stage the scene, which was filmed at Paramount's east coast studio at Astoria, Long Island.

Stoopnagle and Budd were featured in a Screen Songs cartoon for Max Fleischer, Stoopnocracy (1933), in which they appear in a live-action segment. Stoopnagle displays more inventions, including a cigar that makes the user sound like Bing Crosby. Budd tries it and, imitating Crosby, leads the audience in a sing-along of "Please".

They starred in only one film, a two-reel comedy for Educational Pictures titled The Inventors (1934). They show a college class how to assemble a "Stoopenstein", their version of a Frankenstein monster.

== Network and sponsor interference ==
Taylor and Hulick were very protective of their unique brand of whimsy, and even had a special clause written into their contracts: "Be it understood that Stoopnagle and Budd are the sole judges of what makes a script funny." As Taylor explained, "First we built up a reputation for doing our own stuff -- stuff we thought was funny -- on the air. Then a sponsor would come along and hire us for his show. Right away he would start to change our act. He would insist on our doing what he thought was funny instead. Naturally, when we did this, we weren't funny at all because we weren't ourselves. Then we got on sustaining [unsponsored], and though we didn't make half so much money, we had twice as much fun and a lot fewer headaches." The team even called attention to their sustaining status on the air, as Budd's mean-old-man character Mr. Bopp led off one program by yelling into the microphone, "Ya-a-a-a-ay! Stoopnagle and Budd still haven't got a sponsor! Stoopnagle and Budd are in the doghouse! Nyaaaaah!" Despite their aversion to interference, they did accept offers from no fewer than 15 sponsors over the course of their radio career.

The team's irreverence toward sponsors wasn't confined to the broadcasts. Budd Hulick recalled that when Stoopnagle and Budd were sponsored by Gimbel's department store in New York, they started answering their office telephone with "Hello, Gimbel's basement." The caller said, "Sorry, I'm trying to get hold of Stoopnagle and Budd." The caller kept trying, only to be repeatedly greeted with "Hello, Gimbel's basement." After several attempts the caller finally blew up: "What the hell's the matter with that operator? This is Mr. Gimbel and I'm calling from the store, and that damn fool keeps connecting me with the basement!"

== Separation, return, and split ==
Taylor and Hulick were forced into a trial separation in November 1935, when their scripted, sponsored program for CBS failed to achieve the success of their free-wheeling, unsponsored shows. CBS reassigned the partners temporarily: Taylor went on a California vacation while Hulick led an orchestra of studio musicians, with his wife (the former Wanda Hart) as the vocalist.

Taylor and Hulick were reunited in January 1936. Later that year, Fred Allen hired them as his summer replacement. Then the NBC Blue Network engaged them to star as The Minute Men (1936–37) for Minute Tapioca. Following this engagement, the team took ads in trade papers and humorously announced their availability: "COL. STOOPNAGLE AND BUDD. LAYING OFF through the courtesy of Minute Tapioca." "Stoopnagle and Budd" made their last radio appearance on February 16, 1938, with the Paul Whiteman orchestra, after which they dissolved their partnership.

Neither Taylor nor Hulick disclosed the reasons for the split, although Radio Stars magazine reported: "Stoopnagle says that so many rumors were rampant about the split that he and Budd thought they'd better comply." The actual cause was the team's old nemesis, network interference. The team's brand of comedy was considered too dry, not commercial enough. Billboard columnist Jerry Franken explained: "They couldn't be sold. Translated, that means their stuff was too good... The Stoop's humor was not of the wallop-in-the-mush variety, but more akin to [Fred] Allen's style with more nonsense." Franken reported that scriptwriters for the Whiteman show were ordered "not to write anything along the lines of [Taylor's] former work." The failure and humiliation were evidently too much for Taylor and Hulick to sustain, and they went their separate ways.

== As solo performers ==
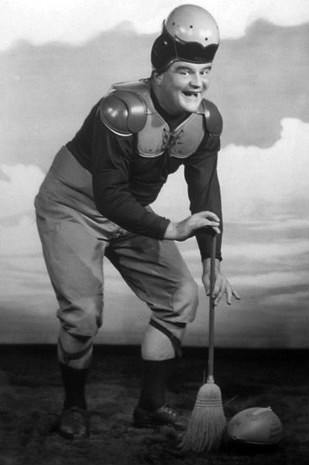
Taylor as host of the Quixie-Doodles show, 1940

Taylor, retaining his "Col. Lemuel Q. Stoopnagle" stage name, was back on the air a month later, on Rudy Vallee's network program of March 24, 1938. Billboard devoted its review to Stoopnagle: "Supposedly, Stoopnagle was to try to bring his humor to a lower level. He did, slightly, on the Vallee show... He takes an ordinary sentence and emphasizes the wrong half or a phrase that shouldn't be accented, or breaks it up by a pause with a two-second break and a rising inflection. [As in "What's that in the road – a head?"] Hard to describe in print, it's really screwy and hilarious." He then embarked on a radio comedy series with Donald Dickson on the Yankee Network in New England, and was a summer substitute for Fred Allen on Town Hall Tonight.

Hulick also returned to network radio in March 1938, the same week as Stoopnagle. The Mutual network hired him as co-host of What's My Name? with Arlene Francis; the quiz format had Hulick bantering with contestants and doing celebrity impersonations. He became a radio game-show emcee, hosting Mutual's Music and Manners and Quizzer Baseball before relocating to Pennsylvania for a brief career in farming.

== Writing ==
Taylor did most of the writing for the team, specializing in subtle whimsy and wordplay, with Hulick contributing his spoken wit. One of Stoopnagle's venerable routines (collected in book form in 1946) was reciting bedtime stories like Cinderella with Spoonerisms, so "Rindercella" went to a "bancy fall" and "slopped her dripper." This routine was used almost verbatim by comedian Archie Campbell of TV's Hee Haw.

Taylor had four books published under the name of "Colonel Stoopnagle", including:

- You Wouldn't Know Me from Adam (1944) (Foreword by Fred Allen)
- Father Goosenagle: Nonsense and Fun for Everyone (1945)
- My Tale is Twisted! Or the Storal to This Mory (1946)
- My Back to the Soil; or, Farewell to Farms (1947)

Among Taylor's book introductions/forewords:

- Paul Webb, Comin' Round the Mountain (1938)
- Lawrence Lariar, editor, Best Cartoons of the Year 1945 (1945)

== Later lives ==
F. Chase Taylor was married twice. His first wife was Lois deRidder, daughter of a prominent shoe manufacturer of Rochester, New York; they had one son, Frederick Chase Taylor, Jr., born in 1921. The couple was divorced in 1936. On February 15, 1936, Taylor married Kay Bell of the CBS press department; Budd was his best man.

Budd Hulick was announcing a radio broadcast from the Palais Royal nightclub in Buffalo, where band vocalist Wanda Hart (1908–1978) was appearing; they were married two weeks later. They had two daughters, Dawn and Victoria; Victoria died at the age of five in 1947.

Both Taylor and Hulick went on to steady solo careers in broadcasting. Taylor continued to appear in comedy movie shorts and whimsical radio programs. "Col. Stoopnagle" substituted for Burns and Allen (1943), Duffy's Tavern (1944), Bob Hawk (1947), and Vaughn Monroe's Camel Caravan (1947–48). Taylor also achieved success as a whimsical quizmaster, in Quixie Doodles on Mutual and CBS (1939–1944), The Colonel (1943), Stoopnagle's Stooperoos (1943), and Col. Stoopnagle's Quiz Academy (1948). He reflected on his radio career for syndicated columnist Ben Gross in 1947: "The truth is, the team of Stoopnagle and Budd were far ahead of their time. Whimsical fun, bordering on fantasy. That's my field and, although I don't earn top money, I feel I've contributed to the radio picture. I began to do stuff like that on the air 17 years ago -- the very kind of stuff Henry Morgan is featuring these days. By the way, Henry has added greatly to the importance of radio comedy. I'm sorry he has lost his sponsor."

Taylor was an attraction on early television. He was a quizmaster on a July 1944 program on pioneer Schenectady station WRGB. In 1949 Taylor made one foray into the new medium of commercial, network television with Colonel Stoopnagle's Stoop. That same year Ed Gardner invited Taylor to join his production company in Puerto Rico, to write scripts and make appearances on Duffy's Tavern. Taylor was working in these capacities when he fell ill in 1950. He died in Boston of a heart ailment on May 28, 1950, at the age of 52.

Hulick returned to radio in the 1940s. In 1941 he teamed with Ralph Dumke (formerly one of radio's "Sisters of the Skillet") for the comedy show Studio X over WEAF in New York. Budd Hulick headed the cast of the NBC children's fantasy Happy the Humbug, a series of 12 quarter-hour comedies syndicated for the Christmas season of 1943; by 1946 the library had grown to 54 quarter-hours. Also in 1946, Hulick revived Studio X as a late-night half-hour for the ABC network. In May 1947 he joined WCAP (now WOBM) in Asbury Park, New Jersey as special-events director, hosting a late-night half-hour as well as directing some half-hour playlets performed by the Community Playshop.

In 1948, with "Mr. and Mrs." radio programs sweeping the country, Hulick and his second wife Helen joined WJJL in Niagara Falls, N. Y. for a two-hour-long, weekday-morning show. Hulick's format had the couple as disc jockeys interviewing honeymooners visiting Niagara Falls. On March 13, 1950, the Hulicks were back in Buffalo, co-hosting WKBW's late-weekday-afternoon half-hour Helen and Budd (also known as The Mr. and Mrs. Budd Hulick Show), a light-conversation program aimed at the feminine audience. The Hulicks moved to New Jersey in 1956, where Hulick became a local radio personality.

Later that year the Hulicks relocated to Florida and co-starred on the weekday television show Home with the Hulicks for WPTV-TV in Palm Beach, Florida. Budd Hulick died in Palm Beach on March 22, 1961.
