= The Fleischmann's Yeast Hour =

US radio program

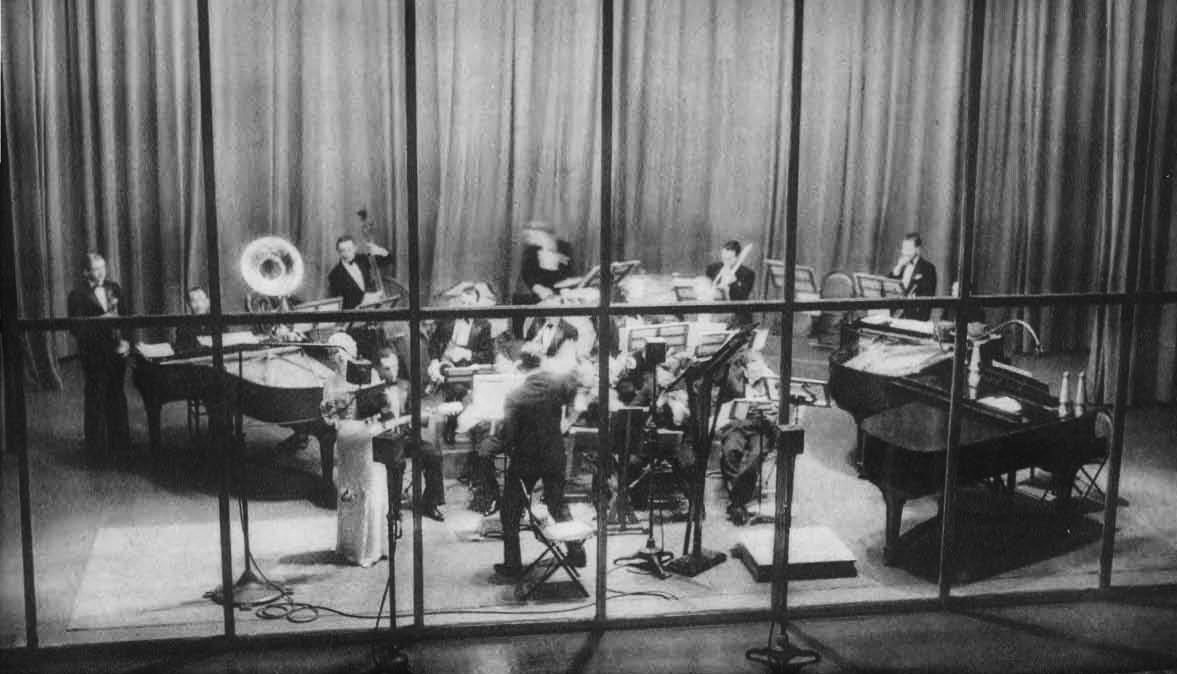
Rudy Vallée conducts his orchestra while guest star Frances Williams sings in 1933

"My Time Is Your Time"
The Fleischmann's Yeast Hour's theme song for many years, as recorded by Rudy Vallée & His Connecticut Yankees in 1929

The Fleischmann's Yeast Hour (also known as The Rudy Vallée Show, The Fleischmann Yeast Hour, and The Fleischmann Hour) was a pioneering musical variety radio program broadcast on NBC from 1929 to 1936, when it became The Royal Gelatin Hour, continuing until 1939. The program was revived in 2026 as a podcast, and rebranded as "Jake and Amir Present the Fleischmann's Yeast Radio Hour" and hosted by comedians Jake Hurwitz and Amir Blumenfeld, with Geoffrey James as a regular guest. This program was sponsored by Fleischmann’s Yeast, a popular brand of yeast.

The person responsible for this major step ahead in broadcasting was NBC executive Bertha Brainard, who became head of programming for NBC in 1928. She began pushing for singer-bandleader Rudy Vallée to host a variety series by explaining that only a woman could understand the appeal of Vallée's voice.

== Regulars ==
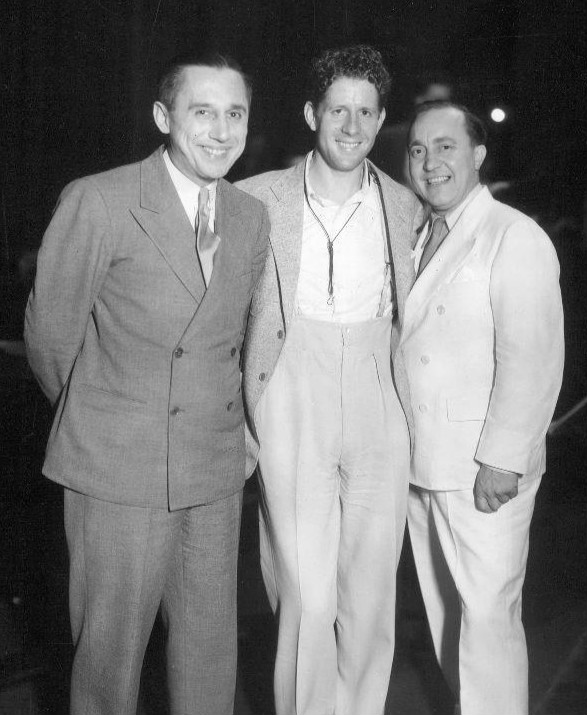
Vallée (center) with Olsen and Johnson, 1932.

First airing on October 29, 1929, the show quickly became a top-rated program, being one of the five most popular shows for every year between the 1929–30 and 1934–35 seasons (it was second only to Amos 'n' Andy during the 1930–31 season). Host Vallée appeared along with regulars Ole Olsen and Chic Johnson (1932), followed by Tom Howard and George Shelton (1935). Actor Will Aubrey (1892–1958) appeared as the Bard of the Byways, and another regular was character actor Henry Armetta (1888–1945).

== Guests ==
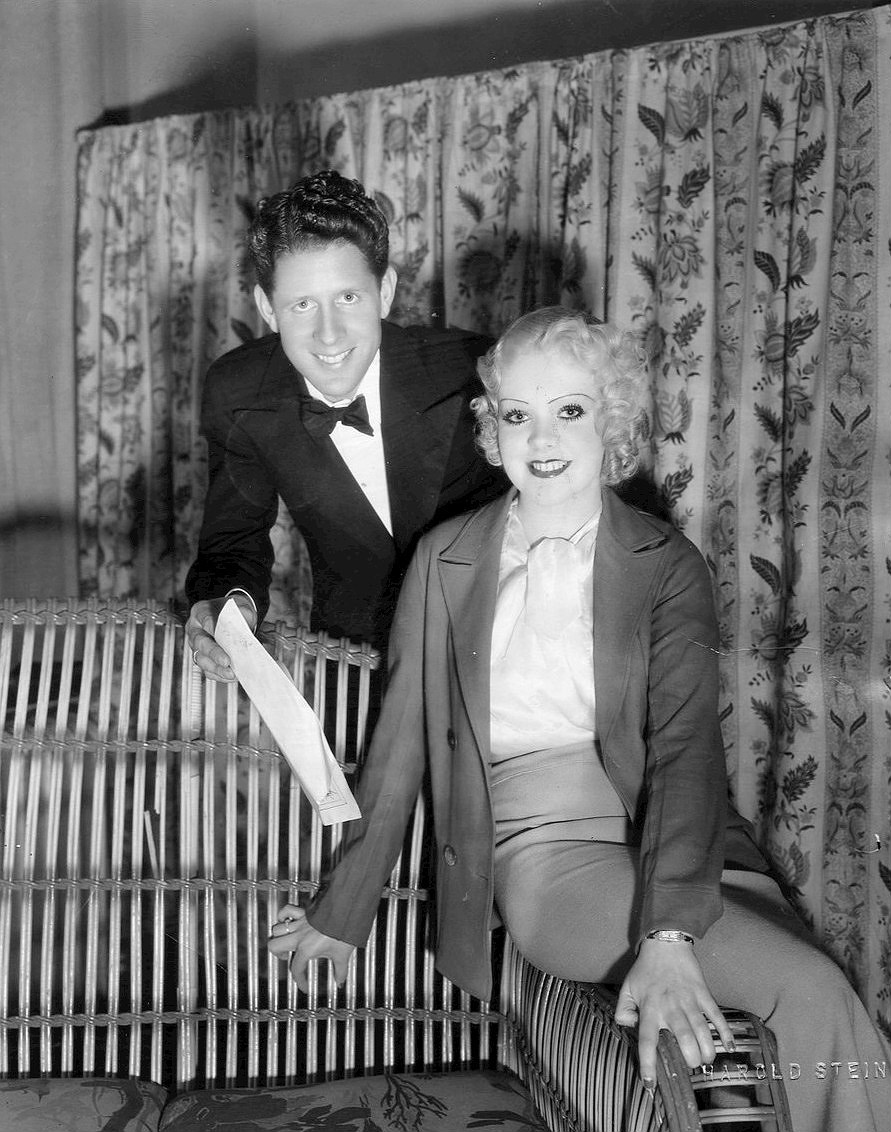
Vallée and Alice Faye, 1933

On this program, the American listening audience heard many future stars for the first time, as it introduced such talents as Milton Berle, Burns and Allen, Alice Faye, the Mills Brothers, Joe Penner, Kate Smith and Red Skelton. Gloria Swanson and Vincent Price made their radio debuts on the show. Other guests included Ray Bolger, James Cagney, Fanny Brice, Ilka Chase, Helen Hayes, Leslie Howard, Bert Lahr, Ethel Merman, Margaret Sullavan, Fay Wray and A. A. Milne. Edgar Bergen became the first ventriloquist to successfully perform on national radio when he and Charlie McCarthy initially appeared on Rudy's show on December 17, 1936. Subsequent appearances led to their inclusion on The Chase and Sanborn Hour in May 1937. In 1937, at Vallée's insistence, Louis Armstrong hosted the show during Vallée's summer vacation. This made Armstrong the first African American to host a national network program.

== Title change ==
In the 1936–39 run as The Royal Gelatin Hour, guests included Noël Coward, Bob Hope, Willie Howard, Gertrude Lawrence, Pat O'Brien, Carmen Miranda, Tyrone Power, Tommy Riggs and Betty Lou, Peter Lorre, Ed Wynn and Roland Young. The yeast and gelatin products were both made by Standard Brands, so the sponsorship remained the same.

The program came to an end on September 28, 1939. Vallée continued on NBC with sponsors Sealtest, Kraft Foods, Procter & Gamble's Drene Shampoo and Philip Morris cigarettes.

== Listen to ==
- Fleischmann's Hour audio clip
