= Wheatena =

High-fiber cereal

- A box of Wheatena from 2006
- Type: Porridge
- Place of origin: United States
- Region or state: New York City
- Created by: George H. Hoyt
- Main ingredients: Wheat

Wheatena is an American high-fiber, toasted-wheat cereal that originated on Mulberry Street in New York City, New York, c. 1879, when a small bakery owner began roasting whole wheat, grinding it, and packaging it for sale under this brand name.

== History ==
Wheatena was created by George H. Hoyt in the late 19th century, when retailers would typically buy cereal (the most popular being cracked wheat, oatmeal, and cerealine) in barrel lots, and scoop it out to sell by the pound to customers. Hoyt, who had found a distinctive process of preparing wheat for cereal, sold his cereal in boxes, offering consumers a sanitary appeal.

Hoyt advertised the cereal in newspapers as early as 1879 and sold the business six years later to Dr. Frank Fuller, a physician with an interest in nutrition, who had founded the Health Food Company. Fuller adapted Hoyt's method to his own process for preparing a wheat cereal, and moved manufacturing to Akron, Ohio, close to the wheat supply.

A.R. Wendell bought Health Foods in 1903, and incorporated it as The Wheatena Company that year. In 1907, the company moved to a new plant, dubbed "Wheatenaville", in Rahway, New Jersey. By the mid-1920s, millions of boxes were sold each year.

In the early 1960s, the Kansas City, Missouri-based Uhlmann Company, owner of the Standard Milling Company, purchased both the Wheatena corporation and Highspire Flour Mills, which for several years had been supplying the 100% cracked wheat used in the cereal. Uhlmann moved Wheatena manufacturing to Highspire, Pennsylvania, in October 1967. The company began leasing its flour-milling facilities to the agribusiness giant ConAgra Foods in early 1987, and sold the cereal manufacturing operation to American Home Food Products in April 1988. Uhlmann retained rights to the Wheatena brand until shortly after International Home Foods acquired American Home Foods in November 1996 and then bought the brand name from Uhlmann. International Home Foods was in turn acquired by ConAgra in August 2000.

Entrepreneur William Stadtlander bought the brand and the Pennsylvania manufacturing plant on October 31, 2001, under the newly formed Homestat Farm, Ltd. of Dublin, Ohio, which as of 2006 manufactures Wheatena and fellow vintage cereals Maypo and Maltex.

In mid-2006, the state of California sued Homestat under California Proposition 65 (1986), which requires labeling for food containing acrylamide, a potential carcinogen created when starch is baked, roasted, fried or toasted, while Federal Food and Drug Administration (FDA) regulations do not.

== Wheatenaville ==
There were two shows: Raising Junior preceded Wheatenaville.

There were two editions: San Francisco (at least: 3 November 1931 to 22 April 1934), and the eastern (at least: August 1933 to 20 April 1934, then 27 August 1934 to ?).

"WHEATENA Corporation, Rahway, N. J., started Nov. 3 to stage its "Raising Junior" feature, an NBC-WJZ offering, over an NBC Pacific Coast network consisting of KPO, San Francisco; KGA, Spokane and KJR, Seattle. KECA, Los Angeles, will add the program Dec. 1. Scripts are written by Peter Dixon, who, with his wife, acts in the New York presentation, and the same continuity is used by the West Coast cast." - BROADCASTING, 15 November 1931

"Peter Dixon, author of Raising Junior, a daily sketch, found his way to the air through the press relations department of the NBC. His wife, Aline Berry, had formerly been an actress and was ambitious to continue with her career. Peter had an idea. Now the whole Dixon family is on the air, at least so far as the skit is concerned."

In the early 1930s, Wheatena sponsored Wheatenaville on NBC's Pacific network. The program debuted September 26, 1932. The cast included Tom Hutchinson, Roberta Hoyt, "who is making her first radio appearance", Elizabeth Mallory and Eddie Firestone Jr., "also radio novices", Harold Peary, "who is doing several parts", Wilda Wilson Church, Bobbe Deane, and Bert Horton, with Nelson Case as announcer.

"In 1932, “Wheatenaville Sketches” debuted on the NBC and Columbia networks, in which the fictitious Batchelor family ate a daily breakfast as “good, wholesome and nourishing” as the show itself. The half-hour episodes showed Billy Batchelor (voiced by actor Raymond Knight), publisher of the Wheatenaville News..."

In January 1933, Florence Halop and Raymond Knight were heard, for 15 minutes, on Wheatenaville on WEAF and WSAI.

== Popeye the Sailor ==
Wheatena sponsored 87 episodes of the thrice-weekly Popeye the Sailor radio program on NBC's Red Network, from its Tuesday, Sept.10, 1935, premiere through March 28, 1936. The product was integrated into the narrative as a source, in addition to spinach, of Popeye's superhuman strength. Announcer Kelvin Keech would sing, to composer Sammy Lerner's "Popeye" theme, "Wheatena is his diet / He asks you to try it / With Popeye the sailor man". Wheatena reportedly paid King Features Syndicate $1,200 per week.

After this initial run, the show was broadcast Mondays, Wednesdays and Fridays at 7:15–7:30 p.m. on WABC (now WCBS-AM) from August 31, 1936, to February 26, 1937, for an additional 78 episodes. Once again, sung references to spinach were conspicuously absent. Now Popeye would sing, "Wheatena's me diet / I ax ya to try it / I'm Popeye the Sailor Man".

== Nutritional analysis ==
"Nutrition Facts" required by California's Proposition 65:

- Acrylamide – 1057 (ppb)

"Nutrition facts" as they appear on a 2007 box:

Ingredients: toasted crushed whole wheat, wheat bran, wheat germ and calcium carbonate. Serving size: 1/3 cup (dry) Amount per serving:

- Calories 160
- Calories from fat 10
- Total fat 1
  - Saturated fat 0 grams
  - Trans Fat 0g
  - Polyunsaturated Fat 0.5g
  - Monounsaturated fat 0g
- Cholesterol 0 milligrams
- Sodium 0 mg
- Potassium 190 mg
- Total carbohydrate 32g
- Dietary fiber 5.5g
- Sugars 0g
- Protein 5g
- Vitamin A 0%
- Vitamin C 0%
- Calcium 20%
- Iron 10%
- Riboflavin 4%
- Niacin 10%
- Phosphorus 20%

"Nutrition facts" as they appear on 2006 box

Serving size: 1 cup (141 grams) Amount per serving

- Calories – 503
- Calories from fat – 37
- Total fat – 4.1g
  - Saturated fat – 0.6g
  - Polyunsaturated fat – 2.1g
  - Monounsaturated fat – 0.6g
- Cholesterol – 0 mg
- Sodium – 18 milligrams
- Total carbohydrates – 106.6g
- Dietary fiber – 18.0g
- Sugars – 2.3g
- Protein – 18.5g

% Daily Value, based on a 2000-calorie diet

- Vitamin A – 1%
- Vitamin C – 0%
- Calcium – 4%
- Iron – 28%

== Audio ==
- 1930s Popeye the Sailor Wheatena audio clip

== Video ==
- National Association of Manufacturers: "Cool Stuff Being Made: How Cereal Is Made – Wheatena": video by the Pennsylvania Cable Network

== See also ==
- Farina (food)
- List of porridges
