= The Landt Trio =

- The Landt Trio - Karl, Jack, and Dan - on Sing Along with the Landt Trio

Background information
- Genre: Vocal
- Years active: 1928–1951
- Past members: Karl Benson Landt; John " Jack" Mathias Landt; Daniel "Dan" Beckwith Landt
- Website: www.landttrio.com

The Landt Trio was one of the busiest singing groups in early radio. In 1928, the three brothers, Karl (1908–1997), Jack (1911–1959), and Dan (1896–1961) Landt, with their accompanist Howard White, were signed onto the NBC Blue Network as sustaining artists and began a career of more than 20 years. They performed primarily on the radio but also performed in vaudeville, including some headline runs at the Palace and Carnegie Hall, and made many personal appearances. They were unusual in the music world in that they did not read music, so they sang and played by ear. They continued to perform on radio and in advertising until the early 1950s, when the rising popularity of television ended their performance career.

== Early years and family ==
Karl Benson, John "Jack" Matthias, and Daniel "Dan" Beckwith were three of the five children of Matthias Cole Landt, a foreman in the Lackawanna Woolen Mills in Scranton, Pennsylvania, and Hulda Teresa Amena Benson Landt, who had immigrated to the United States from Sweden with her parents at the age of two. There were also two daughters, Edith and Mildred. They were a musical family. Matt sang and played guitar, Hulda was a contralto. The parents sang with and to their children, and the children learned to sing and harmonize together. Karl was said to be able to sing harmony before he could talk and became a boy soloist in the Lutheran Church choir. Matt was enamored of Thomas Edison's new phonographic technology and used wax cylinders to record his children's singing. After leaving his job at the woolen mill, he sold Edison phonographs and was known as "the Edison man," until radio displaced phonographs in most homes.

After Karl taught himself to play the ukulele, he and Jack began singing together, as young teens, for friends and family and eventually on local Scranton radio stations, WGBI and WQAM, calling themselves the Landt Brothers. Older brother, Dan, had joined the U.S. Army at the age of 16 and served in the Pancho Villa Expedition under General "Blackjack" Pershing, and then in Germany in World War I. While in Europe, he sang in a quartet with Eddie McManus.

After the war, Dan returned to Scranton looking for work. He found the family in difficult financial circumstances since his father had been reduced to selling cookware door-to-door, sister Mildred was working for a pittance as a secretary at the A&P, 20-year-old Karl was out of work, and Jack was still in school at age 16. Dan joined his younger brothers in their singing act, and introduced them to a friend, Howard White, who owned and ran a bakery. White had learned to play piano from a self-taught black pianist who "only played on the black keys." Known as Howard "Velvet Fingers" White, Howard could play only by ear and was the perfect match for the trio, who sang only by ear. Meanwhile, Eddie McManus, who was a friend of Howard as well as Dan, had become a vaudeville performer and encouraged the group to take their act to New York. Because they had no money, Karl borrowed $300 from his Sunday School teacher, and they set off to try to "make it" in vaudeville.

== Early career ==
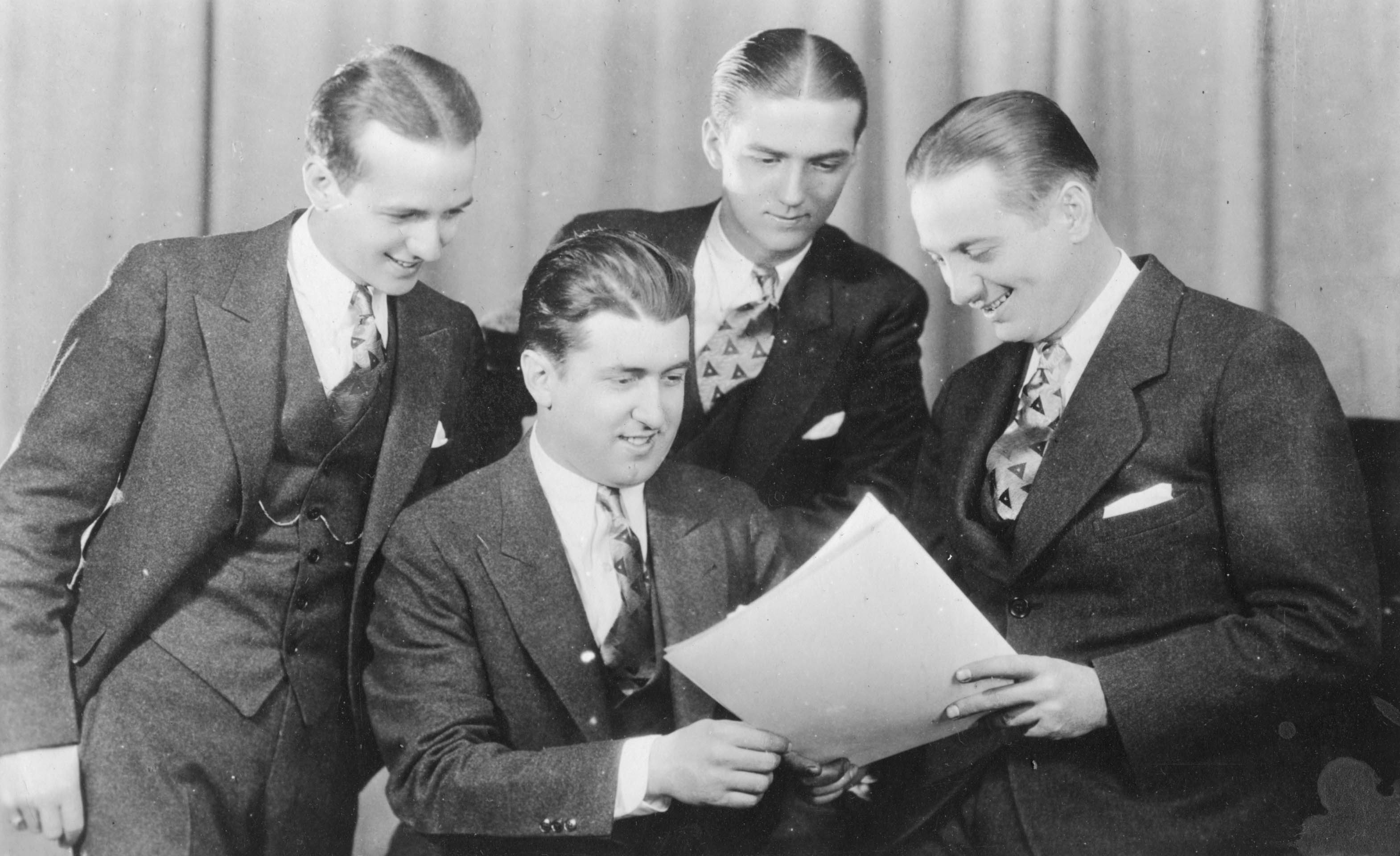
The Landt Trio & White in 1929

During their first few weeks of auditioning and singing at parties in New York, the group found themselves receiving a great deal of encouragement, but no firm job offers. A large part of their appeal seemed to be their youthful, small-town innocence, and the way their pleasing harmonies blended with the velvety sound of White's piano. After five weeks, an NBC talent scout overheard them, and sent them to audition with Tim Sullivan of NBC Artists' Services. Calling themselves "The Landt Trio and White," they were signed to a contract as sustaining artists for the NBC Blue network.

Howard White's friend Kenny Raught, who had worked in Howard's Bake Shop in Scranton, had a talent for words and a great sense of humor. He joined the group in New York and became their writer. He later married their sister Mildred. The trio moved their parents and sister to New York, and soon older sister Edith and her husband followed to be near them. The family remained very close, living either in the same house or within a few blocks of each other throughout most of their career. The family's closeness was reflected in the style of their performance, which was always family-friendly and had a certain wholesomeness that was appealing to much of their audience.

As sustaining artists, the Landt Trio and White appeared on many variety programs on the National Broadcasting Company (NBC), which had been formed in 1926. When the network expanded its programming to earlier morning hours, in November 1928, the trio was tapped for their first series, "On the 8:15". This program skyrocketed in popularity as a cheerful way to prepare workers for their morning commute. Its format, performing a mix of popular standards and novelty tunes with a humorous repartee, became a pattern for many of their later shows.

The Landt Trio & White about 1936.

They became one of the busiest acts on the radio at this time, with programs or appearances throughout the broadcast day. Some of their sponsors were Mobiloil, Eveready, Erector Toys, Gilbert Toys, Breyers Ice Cream, Spang Baking Co., Dill's Best with Pick and Pat, Omega Oil, Ford, D&H Coal, and Lucky Strike. In addition, they performed in vaudeville houses, including the Palace, the Roxy, and the RKO Hippodrome. They did numerous personal appearances, including performing at high society parties and visiting wounded veterans in the hospital. They performed with B. A. Rolfe and His Lucky Strike Orchestra, Nathaniel Shilkret and the Victor Orchestra on The Eveready Hour, and with Vincent Lopez. Their career was going full force between 1930 and 1936, with many daytime and prime-time broadcasts, until January 1937 when Howard White died suddenly of a heart attack.

== Later career ==
Howard White's demise was personally painful but also a near catastrophe professionally for the Landt Trio. Karl was the only one who had learned to read any music, and all their arrangements had been written in a shorthand they developed for their own use. They tried out several pianists, including Vi Mealy, and other musical accompaniments. Through this transition, they were rapidly losing sponsored programming, and within a year they had no radio work in New York. However, in the mid-30s, the Landt Trio had begun to do advertising work for George Nelson of the Leighton and Nelson Advertising Agency. Nelson offered them work on radio in Schenectady, New York and the opportunity to barnstorm in the area. They saw this offer as a chance to rebuild their act and their reputation. They had begun to work with a young, talented accompanist and arranger, Curley Mahr, so the four of them agreed to move to Schenectady.

In the fall of 1938, the Landt Trio began performing on WGY, and performed under the name The Landt Trio and Mahr. They spent the next two years working in Schenectady where they learned both new material and new arrangements of songs they had performed with Howard White. Two of their shows during this period were Vest Pocket Varieties and Morning Matinee. They also did commercial work for Mohawk Carpets, Pepsi Cola, Sealtest, and Camel cigarettes. They participated briefly in experimental programming being done there in the new medium of television. They never developed a strong fan base in Schenectady, however, and in early 1940 they returned to New York where they supported themselves through their publishing company, Coast to Coast Music, and by singing jingles.

In 1940, President Roosevelt instituted a one-year peacetime draft. Early in 1941, the Coast to Coast Music Corporation published a song by Mack Kay, "Goodbye Dear, I'll Be Back In A Year," ("cause I'm in the Army now"). The song rapidly rose on the charts, its popularity enhanced by a "soundie," a film short featuring the Landt Trio. However, in August 1941, the draft was extended, causing a widespread protest among the twelve-month draftees. Floods of sheet music were returned, and their soundie became a sad reminder of more optimistic days.

In October 1941, the Columbia Broadcasting System hired the Landt Trio for a five-day-a-week program, Sing Along with the Landt Trio. They received a great deal of fan mail welcoming them back to the air after their hiatus, and their career began to rise again. Sing Along was extended from a fifteen-minute to a half-hour program with a studio audience. To fill the extra time, they instituted games such as "Name That Tune," and "Sing For Silver," which served as ideas for later television game shows. They continued to do a mix of standards and novelty songs with light comedic banter. Perhaps the most enduring song they introduced was "Mairzy Doats." On October 28, 1946, they performed a Sing Along with the Landt Trio program at Carnegie Hall. When Mitch Miller developed his television program Sing Along With Mitch in 1958, he based it on Sing Along with the Landt Trio.

During the "Sing Along" period, the trio worked with several "girl singers" including Julie Conway who was the wife of NBC staff announcer, Robert Sherry, and Carol Ames. Their announcers included Bill Cullen (who later married Ames) and Sandy Becker. They had several other series that ran for shorter periods during this time. Curley Mahr and, later, Johnny Cole were their accompanists during most of this period.

Sing Along with the Landt Trio continued until 1948, when Dan had a heart attack. He was able to come back to work and the trio continued, but it became harder and harder for them to work as television became the preeminent medium. In 1951, Jack had a serious automobile accident that kept him from performing for over six months. That effectively ended the Landt Trio's singing career. When he was able to work again, Jack went on to own and operate a business on Long Island. Dan worked successfully in real estate in Westchester County, New York and became a town assessor. Karl wrote and performed jingles for several years and then developed a new career as a life insurance underwriter.
