= Stratton Rawson =

American film producer

Stratton Rawson is an American independent film producer, screenwriter and music critic. He is best-known for his association with WNED-FM in Buffalo, New York, where he serves as the radio station's senior producer and has been called "Buffalo's Leonard Bernstein."

== Background ==
Rawson grew up in the Hudson Valley of New York State and took up the cello at an early age. He spent four years at SUNY Albany and a year of work for the Chancellor of SUNY, followed by two years at the University of Wyoming and another four years at SUNY Buffalo.

== Film ==
Rawson was one of the screenwriters of Frederick King Keller's Tuck Everlasting (1981). Rawson's films as a producer include My Dark Lady (1987) and Vamping (1984). He has worked on the crew of several films, including The Natural (1984).

== Recordings ==
The recording Christophe Columb (Mode, 1992) featured Rawson as the Magician and narrator. This was a 1992 production of a 1940 BBC Radio play by William Aguet with music by Arthur Honegger. A Downtown Music Gallery review detailed the background on this production:

The art of the radio-play was a very important and respected creative mode of entertainment in Europe before the age of television, where subsidized radio stations encouraged experiments in this medium. Composers such as Britten, Hindemith, Gerhard, and Honegger were quick to take up the challenge, composing memorable scores which were designed from the start as close collaborations with poets and dramatists. Honegger was keen to reach the widest possible public while retaining his own musical ideas. He had already collaborated with numerous distinguished writers for the theater and had supplied scores for films, such as Abel Gance's Napoleon. All of this experience made readied him for a collaboration with William Aguet when Christophe Colomb was proposed for Radio Lausanne in 1940. Christophe Colomb is an ambitious radio-play, scored for 10 actors, an orchestra of 40 musicians, plus a large chorus with soloists. Perhaps it is due to these unusual forces that the piece faded into obscurity after its radio premiere. Through much hard work, Opera Sacra of Buffalo, New York reconstructed Christoph Colomb from the original manuscript and performed it with a new English translation of Aguet's surprisingly astute and politically correct text.

== Classical top ten ==
As a music critic and member of the WNED music staff, Rawson compiled his Classical Top Ten list:

- 1. J.S. Bach: Suite No. 3 in C for unaccompanied cello
- 2. Barber: Knoxville, Summer of 1915
- 3. Beethoven: Symphony No. 9 (“Choral”)
- 4. Berlioz: Harold in Italy
- 5. Brahms: Clarinet Quintet
- 6. Dvorak: Cello Concerto
- 7. Handel: Music for the Royal Fireworks
- 8. Mozart: Divertimento (String Trio) in E-flat, K. 563
- 9. Schubert: String Quintet in C, D956
- 10. Tchaikovsky: Symphony No. 5 in E minor

== Awards ==
- Associated Press First Place Award in 2009 for Best Series for Uncrowned Queens, WNED.

== Listen to ==
- Christophe Columb with Stratton Rawson as the Magician in the 1992 production of William Aguet's BBC Radio play (1940)
