= Raymond Knight (radio) =

American dramatist

- Raymond Knight broadcasting on The Cuckoo Hour in 1931.
- Born: February 12, 1899; Salem, Massachusetts, USA
- Died: February 12, 1953 (aged 54)
- Education: Boston University; Harvard University; Yale University
- Occupations: Actor, comedian, writer

Raymond Knight (February 12, 1899 – February 12, 1953) was an American actor, comedian, writer and comedy writer, best known as a pioneer in satirical humor for network radio.

== Life and career ==
Born in Salem, Massachusetts, Knight studied law at Boston University and passed the Massachusetts bar, but he returned to school to study theater and writing at Harvard's 47 Workshop, followed by more studies at Yale. In 1927, he performed in the Broadway musical revue The Manhatters.

Knight was writing continuity and commercials for NBC in 1929, when NBC programmer Bertha Brainard asked him to devise "something cuckoo" for the Blue Network. He responded with the zany The Cuckoo Hour, aka The KUKU Hour, as a showcase for his comedy. One of his characters on the series was Professor Ambrose J. Weems, who ran a radio station where he would give his views on current events and chat with his sidekick, Mrs. Pennyfeather.

Radio historian Billy Jack Long described the unique aspects of Knight's satirical series:

This show was the forerunner to most of what America thought was funny afterwards. Ray, unlike most of the other radio personalities at the time, didn't have a background in vaudeville. He did all of his work within a short distance from home. Consequently, Ray had a good grasp on what people did when they were at home. Nothing was safe from Ray Knight's sarcasm. It wasn't meant to be rude or upsetting. But The KUKU Hour was so different from anything that was going on at the time. He would bounce back and forth between networks. The show started on NBC and was there for a few years before moving to Mutual. The KUKU Hour did not always have the same characters but it would have the same elements in each show. One of these was a segment called "The Firing Squad". In this, Ray would make comments about a person, a group or an idea, and then have everyone in the studio shoot at it with toy guns. Paper cap guns were provided for members of the studio audience, and even the technical people got involved in this!

Knight replaced actress Aline Berry and her husband, writer Peter Dixon (Raising Junior), when he took over the children's series, Wheatenaville Sketches, sponsored by Wheatena. On this program, Knight portrayed editor Billy Batchelor, running a small town newspaper founded by his uncle. Wheatenaville Sketches and The Cuckoo Hour were both important influences on comedian Bob Elliott, who attended Knight's show with his parents and later became friends with Knight.

== Broadway ==
In 1935 Knight contributed sketches to At Home Abroad, a revue with music by Arthur Schwartz and lyrics by Howard Dietz about a bored couple who flee America and go on a musical world tour. The original Broadway production opened at the Winter Garden Theatre on September 19, 1935, and ran for 198 performances. The cast included Beatrice Lillie, Ethel Waters, Eleanor Powell, Reginald Gardiner and Eddie Foy Jr. This was the first Broadway musical directed by Vincente Minnellii.

Knight's play Run Sheep Run opened on Broadway in 1938 with a cast that included William Bendix and Dick Van Patten. The comedy closed after 12 days.

== Daytime drama ==
In 1941, he created and scripted the radio serial, A House in the Country, about city couple Joan and Bruce attempting to adapt to country life. It aired on the Blue Network weekday mornings from October 6, 1941, to October 28, 1942. Knight took the role of a shopkeeper on the program.

During World War II, Knight was the national production manager for ABC. He was a contributor to Woman's Day and other magazines. In the early 1950s, he wrote for Bob Elliott and Ray Goulding's Bob and Ray show. In 1953, he died on his birthday, February 12. In 1954, Bob Elliott married Knight's widow, Lee (they had three children together, including Chris Elliott), creating a comedic lineage that spans across three centuries and four generations, from Raymond Knight and Bob Elliott to Chris Elliott and his daughter, Abby Elliott.

Raymond Knight's star on the Hollywood Walk of Fame is located at 6130 Hollywood Boulevard.

== See also ==
- List of old-time radio people
