= The Cuckoo Hour =

American musical variety radio series (1930–1936)

Raymond Knight on The Cuckoo Hour in 1931.

The Cuckoo Hour , also known as The KUKU Hour and The Raymond Knight Cuckoo Hour, is an American musical variety radio series created by radio comedian Raymond Knight. It aired on the NBC Blue Network January 1, 1930 – March 9, 1936.

Knight, a pioneer in satirical humor on the radio, studied law at Boston University and passed the Massachusetts bar, but he returned to school to study theater and writing at Harvard's 47 Workshop, followed by more studies at Yale. In 1927, he performed in the Broadway musical revue The Manhatters.

He was writing continuity and commercials for NBC in 1929, when NBC programmer Bertha Brainard asked him to devise "something cuckoo" for the Blue Network. He responded with the zany Cuckoo Hour as a showcase for his comedy, performing as Professor Ambrose J. Weems, who ran a radio station where he would give his views on current events and chat with his sidekick, Mrs. Pennyfeather.

The cast of The Cuckoo Hour included Carl Matthews (1899-1959).

== Listen to ==
- The Raymond Knight Cuckoo Hour (February 14, 1937)
