= Bertha Brainard =

American radio executive (1890 – 1946)

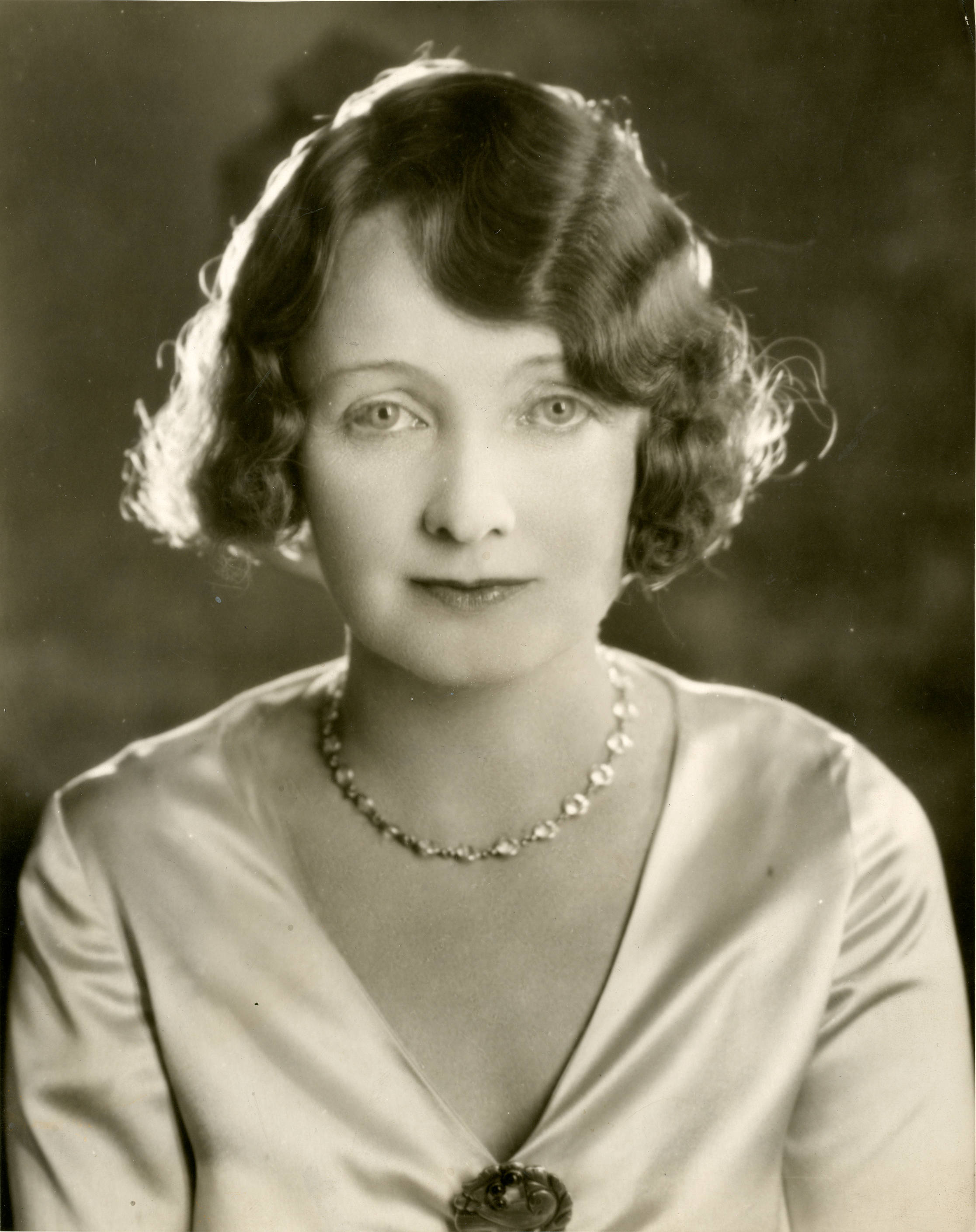
- Born: 16 June 1890
- Died: 11 June 1946 (aged 55)

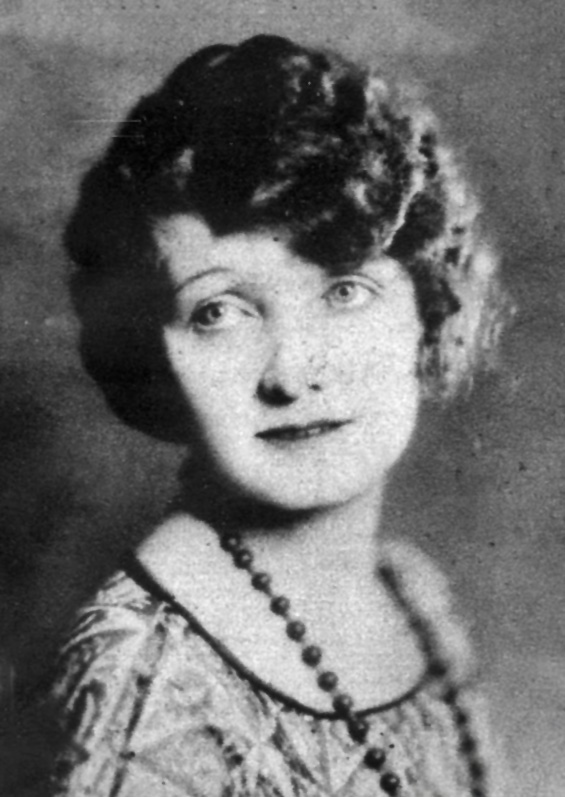
Brainard pictured around 1928

Bertha Brainard (June 16, 1890 – June 11, 1946), known to her friends as Betty, was a pioneering NBC executive responsible for setting trends in network broadcasting.

== Life and career ==
She was born and raised in South Orange, New Jersey, the daughter of Henry Brainard (a former journalist and publisher) and his wife Ada. After graduating high school, she attended a teacher's college in nearby Montclair, but subsequently decided she did not want to teach. During the war, she drove an ambulance for the Red Cross, and with some encouragement from her brother, she decided to try to find work in the new medium of radio. She became a theater critic, and began hosting a program called Broadcasting Broadway for WJZ in Newark beginning in March 1922. By 1923, she became the station's assistant program director, helping to select the live performers and later doing critiques of the station's announcers. By October 1926, she had moved up to program manager.

After she became head of programming for NBC in 1928, the network's first woman executive, she began pushing for singer-bandleader Rudy Vallée to host a variety series by explaining that only a woman could understand the appeal of Vallée's voice.

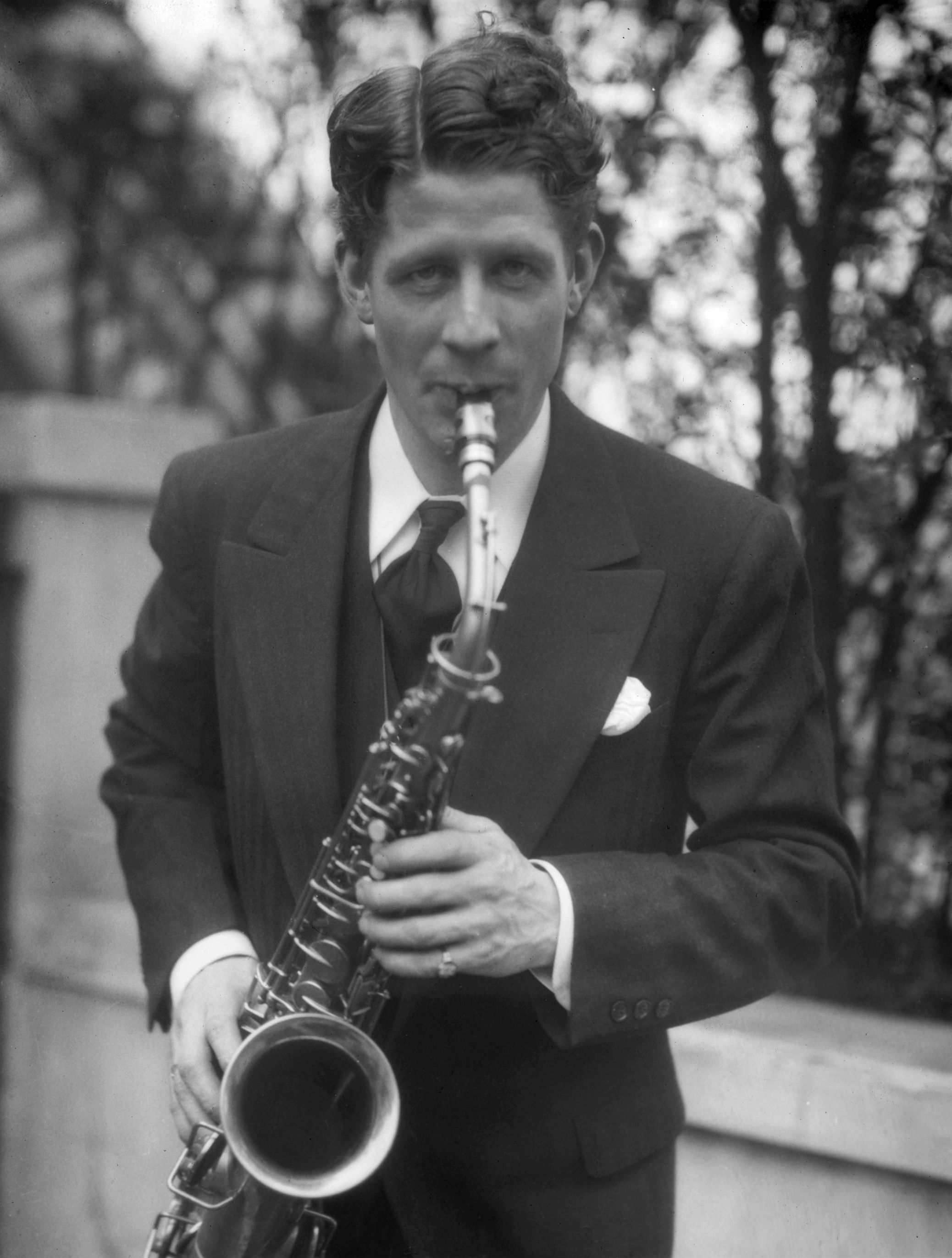
Rudy Vallee

The Fleischmann's Yeast Hour (aka The Rudy Vallée Show, aka The Fleischmann Yeast Hour, aka The Fleischmann Hour) was then launched as a musical variety radio program on NBC from 1929 to 1936, when it became The Royal Gelatin Hour, continuing until 1939.

Beginning October 24, 1929, the show quickly became a top-rated program, second only to Amos 'n' Andy. Host Vallée appeared along with regulars Ole Olsen and Chic Johnson (1932), followed by Tom Howard and George Shelton (1935). On this show, the American listening audience heard many future stars for the first time, as it introduced such talents as Milton Berle, Burns and Allen, Alice Faye, the Mills Brothers and Kate Smith. Gloria Swanson made her radio debut. Other guests included Ray Bolger, Fannie Brice, Ilka Chase, Helen Hayes and Bert Lahr.

=== Radio comedy ===
Brainard also introduced satire to radio by commissioning Raymond Knight to create a comedy show. Knight was writing continuity and commercials for NBC in 1929, when Brainard asked him to devise "something cuckoo" for the Blue Network. He responded with the zany The Cuckoo Hour (aka The KUKU Hour) as a showcase for his wacky humor, performing as Ambrose J. Weems.

Brainard remained an NBC executive until 1946 when she married advertising executive Curt Peterson, with whom she had worked over the years. Her retirement and marriage were brief, as she died of a heart attack, in Huntington, New York, later that year.
