= Shirley Bell Cole =

American actress

- Born: Shirley Adrienne Bell; February 21, 1920 or February 21, 1921
- Died: January 12, 2010 (age 89)
- Occupation: Actress
- Years active: 1930–1940
- Spouse: Irwin Cole

Shirley Adrienne Bell Cole (February 21, 1920 (another source says 1921) – January 12, 2010), also known as Shirley Bell, was an American radio actress; best known as the voice of Little Orphan Annie in the eponymous radio show.

== Early years ==
Born Shirley Adrienne Bell in Chicago's South Side, she grew up in various apartments as her family endured the Depression. Her mother was described as "the consummate stage mother," while her father "left the family when Shirley was a toddler." She attended Lake View High School in Chicago.

== Radio ==
Cole was first heard on radio at age 6, as a member of the WGN Players. Beginning when she was 10 years old, Bell was the primary voice actress of the character Little Orphan Annie from 1930 to 1940 (except for a brief time when a problem with her contract kept her out). She also was on Captain Midnight in the role of Patsy.

In 1995, Bell was heard in a reenactment of Little Orphan Annie on Chuck Schaden's Those Were the Days radio show.

== Family ==
She quit acting in 1940 and married Irwin Cole, an automobile dealer. He was born in Chicago, Illinois, where the couple raised three daughters (Randy, Cathy, and Lory) in the affluent Chicago suburb Glencoe. Irwin Cole died in 1998.

== Later years ==
=== Book ===
She authored Acting Her Age: My Ten Years as a Ten-Year-Old: My Memories as Radio’s Little Orphan Annie (Stinehour Press, 2005). Designed by Susan Cox, the book won Best in Show, Crystal Book Award of Excellence at the Chicago Book and Media Show, and a Silver Award in Fine Editions at the Gold Ink Awards.

=== Commercials ===
In the 1970s, Cole recorded voice-overs for television commercials.

== Death ==
Cole died in Arizona January 12, 2010. She was survived by three daughters and three grandchildren. A memorial service was held in Chicago, Illinois, February 21, 2010.

== See also ==
- Little Orphan Annie
