= Edison Disc Record =

Type of phonograph record produced by Edison Inc. from 1912 to 1929

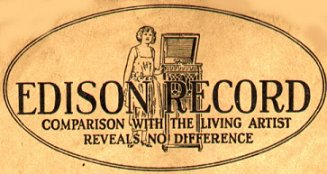
Edison Records logo from 1910s sleeve

The Edison Diamond Disc Record is a type of phonograph record marketed by Thomas A. Edison, Inc. on their Edison Record label from 1912 to 1929. They were named Diamond Discs because the matching Edison Disc Phonograph was fitted with a permanent conical diamond stylus for playing them. Diamond Discs were incompatible with lateral-groove disc record players, e.g. the Victor Victrola, the disposable steel needles of which would damage them while extracting hardly any sound. Uniquely, they are just under 1/4 in (6.0 mm; 0.235 in) thick.

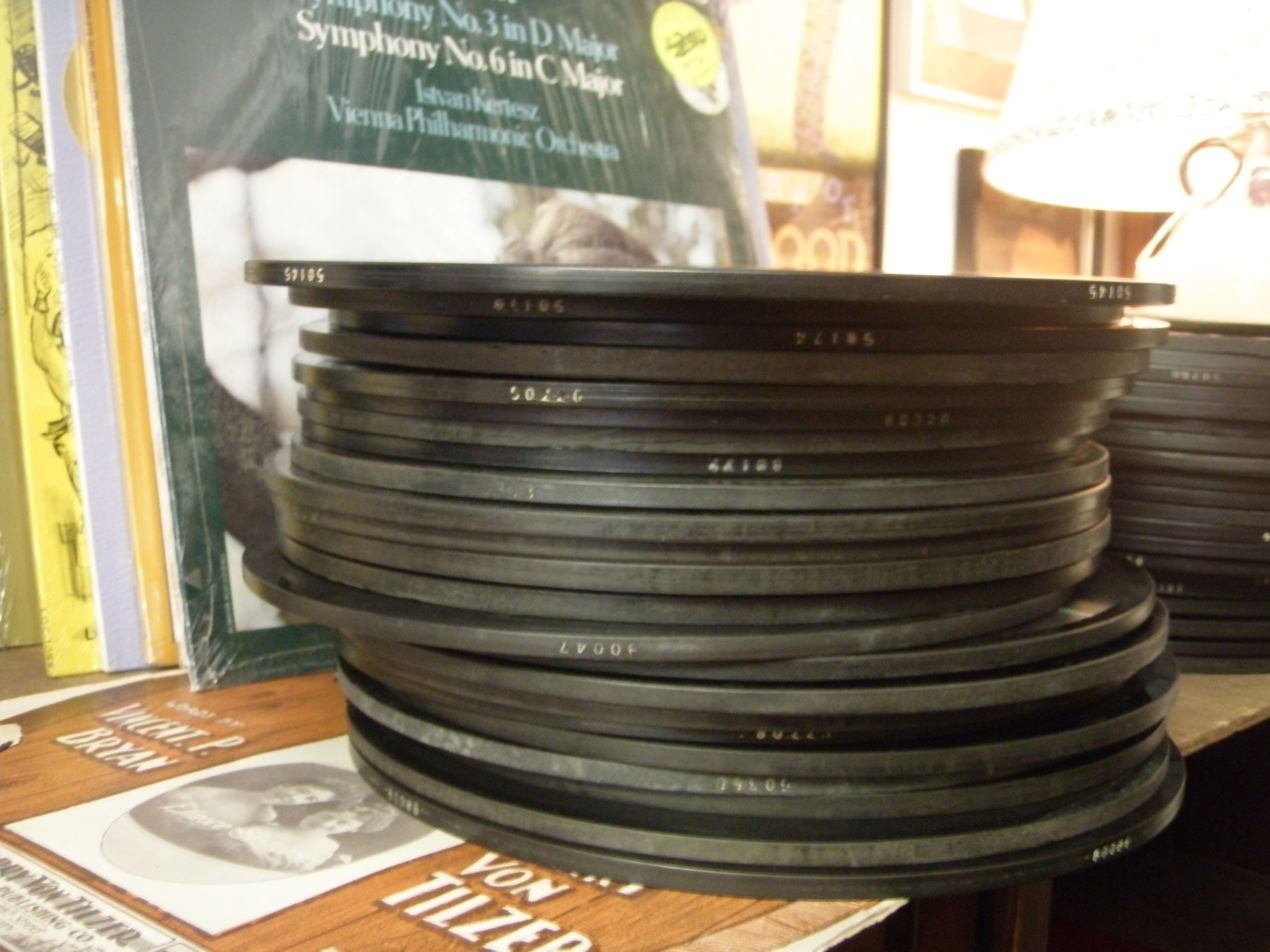
Early Diamond Disc records, showing the thickness of each record and number stamped into side.

Edison had previously made only phonograph cylinders but decided to add a disc format to the product line because of the increasingly dominant market share of the shellac disc records (later called 78s because of their typical rotational speed in revolutions per minute) made by competitors such as the Victor Talking Machine Company. Victor and most other makers recorded and played sound by a lateral or side-to-side motion of the stylus in the record groove, while in the Edison system the motion was vertical or up-and-down, known as vertical recording, as used for cylinder records. An Edison Disc Phonograph is distinguished by the diaphragm of the reproducer being parallel to the surface of the record. The diaphragm of a reproducer used for playing lateral records is at a right angle to the surface.

In the late summer and early fall of 1929 Edison also briefly produced a high-quality series of thin electrically recorded lateral-cut "Needle Type" disc records for use on standard record players.

== Historical background ==
Samuel Siegel and Marie Caveny play Ragtime Echoes
A 1918 Diamond Disc Record with Samuel Siegel on mandolin and Marie Caveny on ukulele.

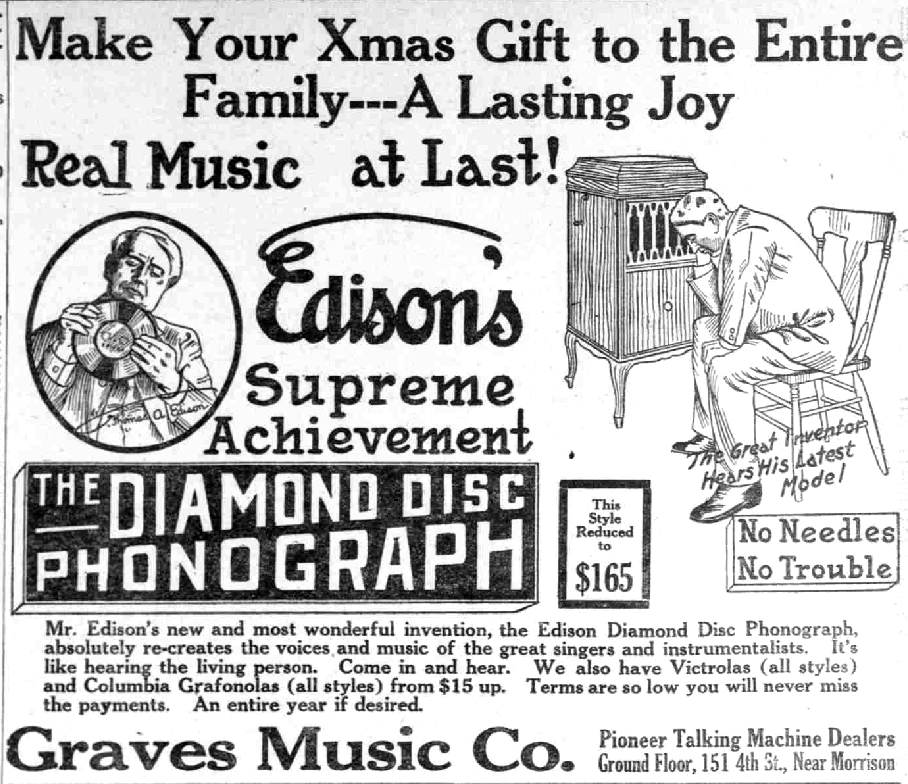
1915 newspaper ad for the product.

The record industry began in 1889 with some very-small-scale production of professionally recorded wax cylinder records. At first, costly wet-cell-powered, electric-motor-driven machines were needed to play them, and the customer base consisted solely of entrepreneurs with money-making nickel-in-the-slot phonographs in arcades, taverns, and other public places. Soon, some affluent individuals were customers, too. By the late 1890s, relatively inexpensive spring-motor-driven phonographs were available and becoming a fixture in middle-class homes. The record industry boomed. At the same time, the Berliner Gramophone Company was marketing the first crude disc records, which were simpler and cheaper to manufacture, less bulky to store, much less fragile, and could play louder than contemporary wax cylinders, although they were of markedly inferior sound quality. Their quality was soon greatly improved, and by about 1910 the cylinder was clearly losing this early format war. In 1912, Thomas Edison, who had previously made only cylinders, entered the disc market with his Diamond Disc Phonograph system, which was incompatible with other makers' disc records and players.

== Unusual characteristics ==
Like cylinder records, the sound in a Diamond Disc's groove was recorded by the vertical method, as variations in the depth of the groove cut. At that time, with the notable exception of Pathé Records, which used yet another incompatible format, a disc's groove was normally of constant depth and modulated laterally, side-to-side. The vertical format demanded a perfectly flat surface for best results, so Edison made his Diamond Discs almost one-quarter of an inch (6 mm) thick. They consisted of a thin coating of a phenolic resin virtually identical to Bakelite on a core of compressed wood flour, later also china clay, lampblack for color, all in a rabbit-hide glue binder. With very rare exceptions, all were about ten inches in diameter, but they used a finer groove pitch (150 threads per inch, or "TPI") and could play longer than lateral ten-inch records—up to 4 1/2 minutes per side.

Among their advantages over the competition, they were played with a permanent conical diamond stylus, while lateral-cut records were played with a ten-for-a-penny steel needle that quickly wore to fit the groove contour and was meant to be replaced after one use. A feed screw mechanism inside the Phonograph moved the reproducer across the record at the required rate, relieving the groove of that work and thus reducing record wear. This design was in response to the patent held by the Victor Talking Machine Company that states that the groove of the record itself is what propelled the reproducer across the surface of the record via the needle. The playing speed for Diamond Discs was specified at exactly 80 revolutions per minute, at a time when other makers' recording speeds had not been standardized and could be as slow as 70 rpm or even faster than 80 rpm, but were typically somewhere around 76 rpm, leaving users who cared about correct pitch to adjust the playback speed for each record until it sounded right. Above all, there was, and still is, general agreement that the Diamond Disc system produced the clearest, most 'present' sound of any non-electronic disc recording technology.

Although Victor's Victrolas and similar record players could not play Diamond Discs (at best, only very faint sound would be heard, while the crude steel needle seriously damaged the groove) and Edison Diamond Disc Phonographs could not play Victor or other lateral-cut discs, third-party suppliers came up with adapters, such as the Kent adapter, to defeat this incompatibility, but typically with less than optimal sound quality. The Brunswick Ultona, the Sonora, and the expensive "Duo-Vox" phonograph made by the piano manufacturer Bush and Lane were the only non-Edison machines that came from the factory equipped to play Diamond Discs as well as Victor and other 'needle-type' records, along with Pathé's sapphire ball stylus hill-and-dale format that used a vertical groove that was U-shaped in cross-section. Edison discouraged all such alternatives by cautioning on some of the record sleeves:

This Re-Creation should not be played on any instrument except the Edison Diamond Disc Phonograph and with the Edison Diamond Disc Reproducer, and we decline responsibility for any damage that may occur to it if this warning is ignored.

The very good reason for such discouragement was that Diamond Disc grooves were too narrow and fragile to propel a soundbox across a record surface, as lateral machines did; Edison's precise mechanical feed system on the Disc Phonograph for its weighted "floating" reproducer replaced that stress on its records.

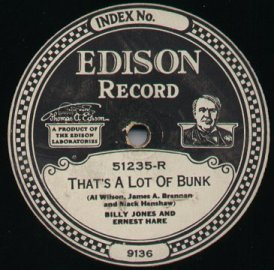
Edison Records "Diamond Disc" label, early 1920s, featuring the Happiness Boys, Billy Jones, and Ernest Hare

== Rise and fall ==
Diamond Discs enjoyed their greatest commercial success from the mid-1910s to the early 1920s, with sales peaking in 1920. Although they arguably had better audio fidelity, they were more expensive than, and incompatible with, other makers' products and ultimately failed in the marketplace. Not least among the factors contributing to their downfall was Thomas Edison's insistence on imposing his own musical tastes on the catalog. As an elderly man who favored old-fashioned "heart" songs and had various idiosyncratic preferences about performance practices, he was increasingly out of touch with most of the record-buying public as the Jazz Age of the 1920s got underway. It was not until mid-decade that he reluctantly ceded control to his sons.

In 1926, an attempt at reviving interest in Edison records was made by introducing a long-playing Diamond Disc which still rotated at 80 rpm but tripled the standard groove pitch to 450 threads per inch by using an ultra-fine groove, achieving a playing time of 24 minutes per 10-inch disc (12 on each side) and 40 minutes per 12-inch disc (these were the only 12-inch Diamond Discs ever sold to the public). A special reproducer and modified feed screw mechanism were required to play them. There were problems with skipping, groove wall breakdown, overall low volume (about 40% of that of the regular Diamond Discs), and a failure to exploit the format by releasing a limited number of discs. Only 14 different Edison Long Play discs were issued before they were discontinued.

In August 1927, electrical recording began, making Edison the last major record company to adopt it, over two years after Victor Records, Columbia Records, and Brunswick Records had converted from acoustical recording. Sales continued to drop, however, and although Edison Diamond Discs were available from dealers until the company left the record business in late October 1929, the last vertically cut direct masters were recorded in the early summer of that year. Priority had been redirected to introducing a new line of Edison lateral or so-called Needle Type thin shellac records, compatible with ordinary record players, but although their audio quality was excellent this concession to commercial reality came too late to prevent the demise of the Edison Phonograph and Records Division just one day before the 1929 stock market crash.

== See also ==
- Unusual types of gramophone records
