= Hinky Dinky Parlay Voo? =

"Hinky Dinky Parlez Vous?"
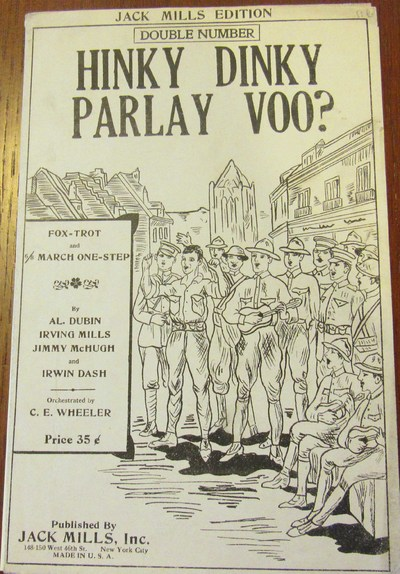

Song
- Published: 1924
- Songwriter(s): Al Dubin, Irving Mills, Jimmy McHugh and Irwin Dash

"Hinky Dinky Parlay Voo?" is a song composed by Al Dubin, Irving Mills, Jimmy McHugh and Irwin Dash in 1924 and published by Jack Mills, Inc. It is a sequel to the popular World War I song, "Mademoiselle from Armentières," having the same refrain.

Successful recordings of the song were made by Ernest Hare and Billy Jones for Columbia Records; and by Billy Murray and Ed Smalle for Victor Records.

The sheet music can be found at the Pritzker Military Museum & Library.
