= Does Your Chewing Gum Lose Its Flavour (On the Bedpost Overnight?) =

Single by Lonnie Donegan & His Skiffle Group
- B-side: "Aunt Rhody"
- Released: late January 1959 (United Kingdom); 21 July 1961 (United States)
- Recorded: New Theatre Oxford, 13 December 1958
- Genre: Skiffle; novelty; music hall
- Length: 2:29
- Label: Pye Nixa (UK); Dot (US)
- Songwriters: Marty Bloom, Ernest Breuer, Billy Rose

Lonnie Donegan & His Skiffle Group singles chronology
"Tom Dooley" / "Rock o' My Soul" (1958)	"Does Your Chewing Gum Lose Its Flavour (On the Bedpost Overnight?)" (1959)	"Fort Worth Jail" / "Whoa Buck" (1959)

"Does Your Chewing Gum Lose Its Flavour (On the Bedpost Overnight?)" is a novelty song by Lonnie Donegan. Released as a single in 1959, it entered the UK singles chart on 6 February 1959 and peaked at number three. It was also Donegan's greatest chart success in the United States, reaching number five on the Billboard Hot 100 chart in 1961. In Canada it reached number 20 in August 1961.

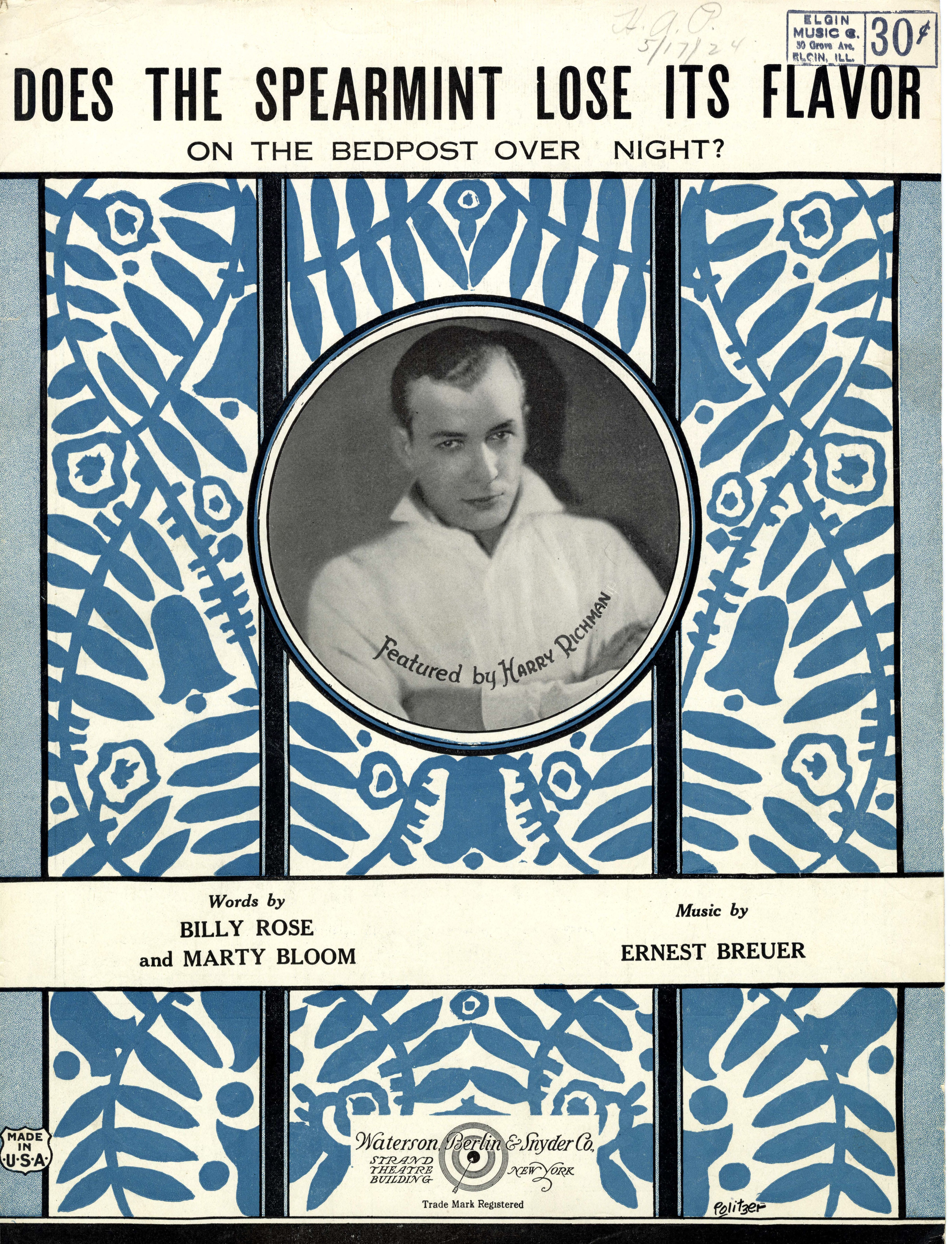
Sheet music cover for the 1924 original

The song is a cover version of "Does the Spearmint Lose Its Flavor on the Bedpost Overnight?" written by Billy Rose, Ernest Breuer (1886-1981), and Marty Bloom and first released in 1924 by The Happiness Boys (Ernie Hare and Billy Jones), and later a hit for Lulu Belle and Scotty and The Two Gilberts. It was also released in the UK in 1924 on Aco (low-priced Vocalion subsidiary) by Jeffries & his Rialto Orchestra (John Thorne vocal). The song is humorous in content, the verses each describing a dramatic or urgent scenario leading up to the asking of the title's question. An even earlier version of the song under the title "Will Chewing Gum Hold Its Flavor on the Bedpost Overnight?" appeared in 1913, interpolated by burlesque and vaudeville entertainer Billy Arlington in his sketch The Golden Crook.

The title and lyrics of the Donegan version were changed in the UK because "Spearmint" is a registered trademark there, and the BBC would not play songs that mentioned trademarks. Donegan's version of the song was recorded live at the New Theatre Oxford in December 1958, and was released both as a single and as a track on the album King of Skiffle. An extended version with more banter was released on the live album The Last Tour.

== Recordings ==
Since Donegan's version was released, it has appeared as a Smarties jingle, a performance on The Muppet Show, and re-worked into Czech by Jiří Grossmann. Additional versions of the song were recorded by The Irish Rovers and Homer & Jethro. In 2010, Donegan's version was used as the background song for a satellite TV advertisement for Savlon antiseptic cream. It has also been recorded by Eric Nagler (on his 1982 children's album Fiddle Up a Tune); Ray Stevens covers the song as part of his 9-CD, 108 song box set The Encyclopedia of Recorded Comedy Music (2012).

== Popularity ==
"Does Your Chewing Gum..." has been a popular song on the Dr. Demento Show, appearing 54 times between the show's premiere and 2006 and selected for the Dr. Demento 20th Anniversary Collection double CD.

In Ken Kesey's novel One Flew Over the Cuckoo's Nest, the character Randle Patrick McMurphy also sings a few lines of this song when he realizes the Chief is storing used gum under his bed.

It was referred to on Talkin' 'Bout Your Generation. It was also alluded to in the lyrics of "Ahab the Arab" by Ray Stevens, and the Buchanan and Goodman 1961 novelty number, "Berlin Top Ten".

It has made an appearances on children's television shows, such as Sharon, Lois, & Bram's Elephant Show, Kidsongs and Barney & Friends. The song "Does The Spearmint..." appears in one episode of HBO's series Boardwalk Empire.

Bruce Springsteen has described the song as having been one of his favorites as a child.

A Swedish cover "En sak, som man ibland kan ligga vaken en hel natt och fundera på" ("Thoughts You Lie Awake Thinking All Night") was sung by comedians Hasse & Tage in the 1968 TV variety show Lådan ("The Box").

== U.S. chart run ==
Billboard Hot 100 (11 weeks, entered August 7, 1961): Reached #5

Cashbox (13 weeks, entered August 5, 1961): 100, 88, 35, 24, 11, 7, 6, 6, 11, 27, 53, 56, 64
