= Irwin Dash =

American songwriter

- Also known as: Lewis Ilda
- Born: Irwin Louis Dash; December 1, 1892; Baltimore, Maryland, U.S.
- Died: March 18, 1984 (aged 91) New York City, U.S.
- Genres: Traditional pop, ragtime, novelty songs
- Occupations: Songwriter, music publisher, pianist
- Years active: 1911–1960s

Irwin Louis Dash (December 1, 1892 – March 18, 1984) was an American songwriter, music publisher and pianist, who sometimes used the pseudonym Lewis Ilda.

== Biography ==
He was born in Baltimore, Maryland, and published his first composition, "Blue Ribbon Rag", a ragtime piano piece, in Philadelphia in 1911. By the early 1920s, he formed a songwriting partnership in New York City with Al Dubin and Jimmy McHugh. They wrote "It's A Man, Ev'ry Time, It's A Man" (1923, recorded by Marcia Freer); and were joined by Irving Mills to write "Hard Boiled Rose" (1924) and "Hinky Dinky Parlay Voo?" (1925). Dash worked as a songwriter for Leo Feist, and as an accompanist, and regularly worked in London as well as in New York.

In the 1930s and 1940s, he published songs and dance music as the proprietor of Irwin Dash Music Co., Ltd., in Denmark Street, London. It was while visiting Dash's office that singer Vera Lynn came across the song "We'll Meet Again", written by Ross Parker and Hughie Charles, which she then recorded; it became her signature song and epitomised the songs of the Second World War.

Dash also wrote songs under the name Lewis Ilda. One of his best remembered songs is "I've Got a Lovely Bunch of Coconuts", written with English songwriters Elton Box and Desmond Cox of Box and Cox Publications, under the collective pseudonym of Fred Heatherton, and copyrighted in 1944. The song was a hit in 1949 for Freddy Martin and his Orchestra, and for Danny Kaye. The same trio of writers, this time using the collective pseudonym Jack Spade, wrote "When Mother was Bathing the Baby", also known variously as "The Mother's Lament" (as recorded by rock band Cream), "The Drain Song", and "Your Baby 'as Gorn Dahn the Plug'ole".

Dash died in 1984, aged 91, and was buried in the Mount Hebron Cemetery in Flushing, New York.
