= Denmark Street =

Street in London

Coordinates: 51°30′55″N 0°07′46″W

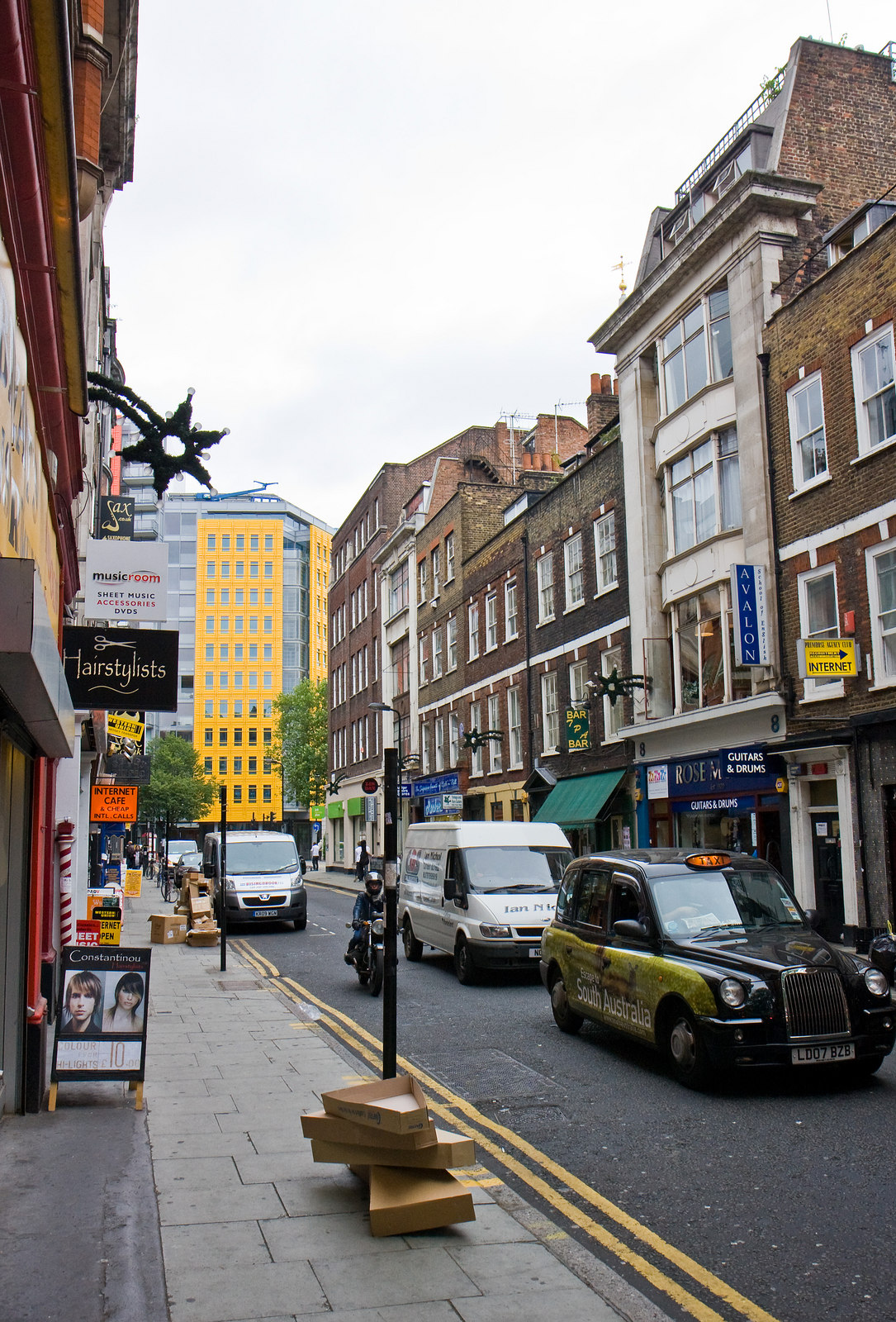
Denmark Street in 2010

Denmark Street is a street on the edge of London's West End running from Charing Cross Road to St Giles High Street. It is near St Giles in the Fields Church and Tottenham Court Road station. The street was developed in the late 17th century and named after Prince George of Denmark. Since the 1950s it has been associated with British popular music, first via publishers and later by recording studios and music shops. A blue plaque was unveiled in 2014 commemorating the street's importance to the music industry.

The street was originally residential, but became used for commercial purposes in the 19th century. At first, metalwork was a popular trade but it became most famous as "the British Tin Pan Alley" housing numerous music publishers' offices. This market declined in the 1960s to be replaced by music shops and independent recording studios. The Rolling Stones recorded at Regent Sound Studio at No. 4 and popular musicians, including David Bowie and the Small Faces, often socialised in the Gioconda café at No. 9. Elton John and Bernie Taupin wrote songs at offices on the street in the 1960s, while the Sex Pistols lived above No. 6, and recorded their first demos there. The comic book store Forbidden Planet and the Helter Skelter music bookshop have also been based on the street. In the 2010s, the surrounding area was redeveloped. Parts of Denmark Street are listed to protect them, but other parts, away from the street itself, were demolished and redeveloped.

== Location ==
Denmark Street is located at the southern end of the London Borough of Camden, close to its boundary with the London Borough of Westminster. It is east of Soho Square, south of St Giles Circus and close to the St Giles in the Fields Church.

The street is 108 metres (354 ft) long and connects Charing Cross Road with St Giles High Street. Vehicular traffic is now only allowed to travel westbound. The nearest London Underground station is Tottenham Court Road, between two and three minutes' walk away.

== History ==
=== Early history ===
The land on which Denmark Street stands was formerly part of the grounds of St Giles Hospital, founded as a house for lepers in the early 12th century by Henry I's wife Matilda (Maud). In 1612, it was recorded as being owned by Tristram Gibbs. The grounds were laid out for development during the reign of James II and developed by Samuel Fortrey and Jacques Wiseman in the late 1680s. Historical evidence suggests the street was formed between 1682 and 1687, as it was not shown on Morden and Lea's Map of 1682. It was named after Prince George of Denmark, who had married Princess Anne in 1683. By 1691, 20 houses had been completed, of which eight remain standing. (Note: Nos 5, 6, 7, 9, 10, 20, 26, 27)

Dr John Purcell, a London physician who published A Treatise on Vapours or Hysteric Fits, lived at No. 10 in the year he died (1730), while the Reverend Doctor John James Majendie – who became Canon of Windsor – lived there from 1758 to 1771. The painter Johann Zoffany lived at No. 9. In the late 18th century, the Jacobite Sir John Murray lived there until the day he was "carried off by a party of strange men".

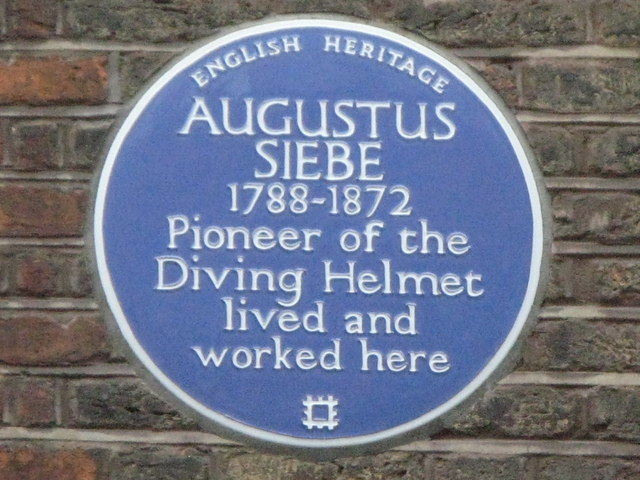
A blue plaque commemorating the former house of Augustus Siebe, who pioneered the diving helmet.

The area around the street was known as the rookery of St Giles, which developed in the 18th century as an unplanned slum to the west of the City, and was described as a "Pandora's box of pollution, plague and pestilence". Though much of the area was cleared by the end of the 19th century, Denmark Street is the only street in London to retain 17th-century terraced facades on both sides. In 2010, a study by Camden London Borough Council suggested that only six other streets in London have a comparable heritage to Denmark Street. A small court connected by passages (originally known as Dudley Court, then Denmark Court and now known as Denmark Place) runs along the back of the north side of the street, connecting to it via an opening at No. 27.

The street started being used for commercial purposes at the beginning of the 19th century and houses were converted for this use. Ground floors became used as shops, while upper floors and back rooms were used as workshops, particularly for metalwork, with a rare pre-Victorian smithy, later a blacksmith's forge, surviving (in a building originally constructed as a stable) in Denmark Place, behind no. 26 Denmark Street. Augustus Siebe, the pioneer of the diving helmet, lived and worked on the street, and today there is an English Heritage blue plaque commemorating him on the house where he lived. Preempting its later fame, an early musical instrument maker, William John Hanbury, is listed at No. 20 in 1836.

In the 1930s, several Japanese businesses were established in the street, which became known as "Little Tokyo". Azakami and Co. at No. 6 sold books, newspapers, televisions and radios. The Tokiwa restaurant and hotel were based at No. 8 and No. 22, respectively, having moved from Charing Cross Road in 1927. Other businesses included a hairdresser, jewellers, tailor and gift shop.

=== Music industry ===
==== 1920s–1950s ====
Lawrence Wright was the first music publisher to set up premises on Denmark Street in 1911. He was initially based at No. 8 and moved to No. 11 after World War I. He subsequently founded the musicians' journal Melody Maker in 1926. The same year, another music publisher, Campbell Connelly, moved from their original offices in Tottenham Court Road to Denmark Street. The New Musical Express was founded at No. 5 in 1952 and remained there until 1964. By the end of the 1950s, the street had established itself as Britain's "Tin Pan Alley" and housed numerous music publishers and other venues connected with the business.

Larry Parnes became a successful manager and entrepreneur of pop singers during the mid-1950s, and regularly took material from songwriters and publishers based in Denmark Street. Lionel Bart, writer of the musical Oliver!, started his writing career for publishers and was subsequently known as "the king of Denmark Street".

==== 1960s ====
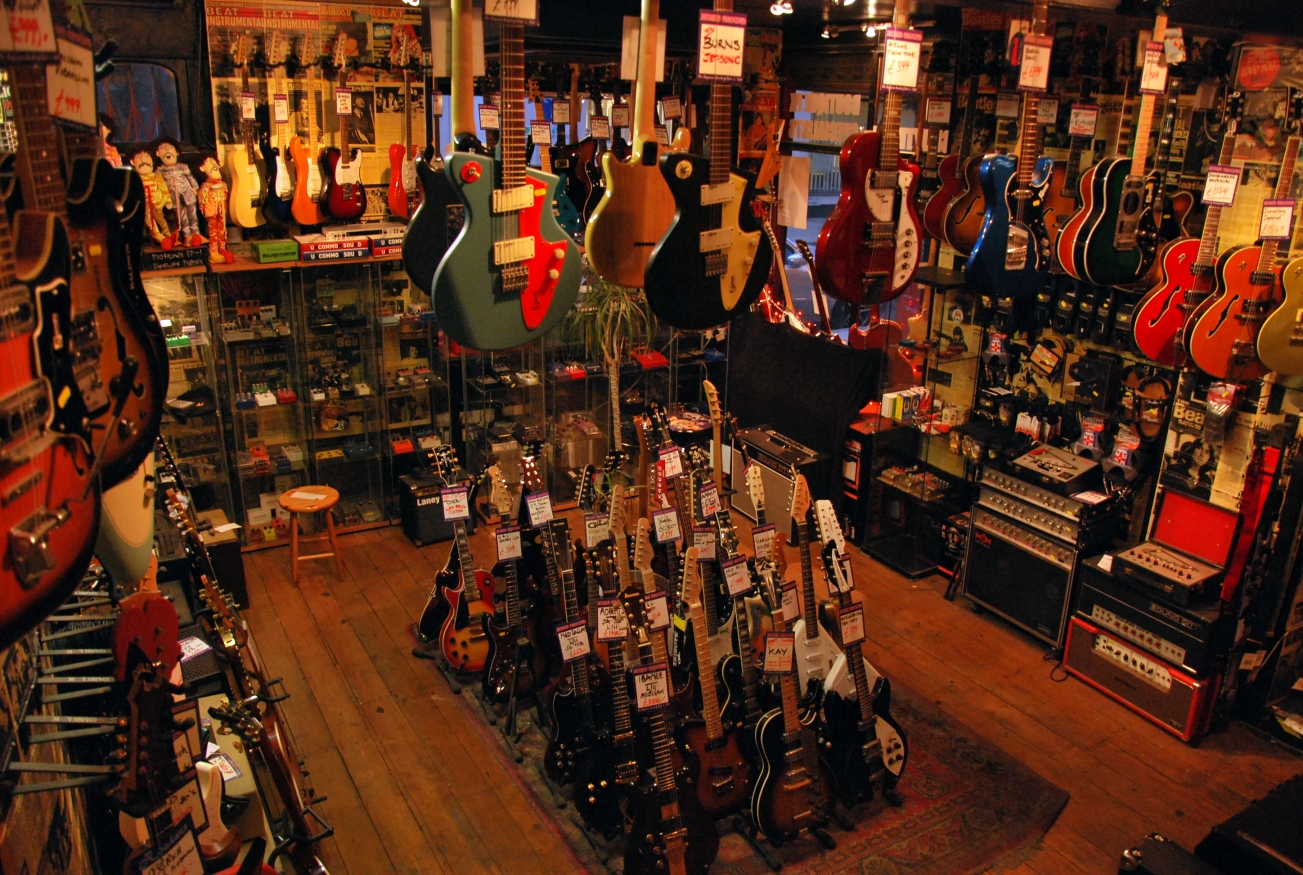
Music shops grew in popularity on Denmark Street after the decline of music publishers in the 1960s.

The music publishing trade on Denmark Street began to decline during the 1960s, as the traditional producers lost touch with changing tastes and groups like the Rolling Stones showed it was possible to write their own material. For example, Paul Simon was based in London at this time but Mills Music, at No. 20, told him that his songs "Homeward Bound" and "The Sound of Silence" were uncommercial.

Recording studios began to be operated in the street. Regent Sound Studio at No. 4 was founded in July 1961 to serve as a unit for publishers to record their songs. The studio was based above the offices of Essex Music and was frequently used by then Stones manager Andrew Loog Oldham. The band recorded their first album at Regent in 1964 and the single "Not Fade Away" became their first major hit to be recorded there. Oldham liked the atmosphere in the studio as he could "stretch out a bit, experiment and learn from our mistakes". The studios eventually expanded and moved into new premises on Tottenham Court Road, while the Denmark Street premises became the sales office. They were subsequently bought by Eddie Kassner at the end of the 1960s. Publishers Box and Cox had their offices at No. 7. Their greatest hit was "I've Got a Lovely Bunch of Coconuts". Southern Music, at No. 8, also had a studio in the ground floor, which was used to record Donovan's hit, "Catch The Wind".

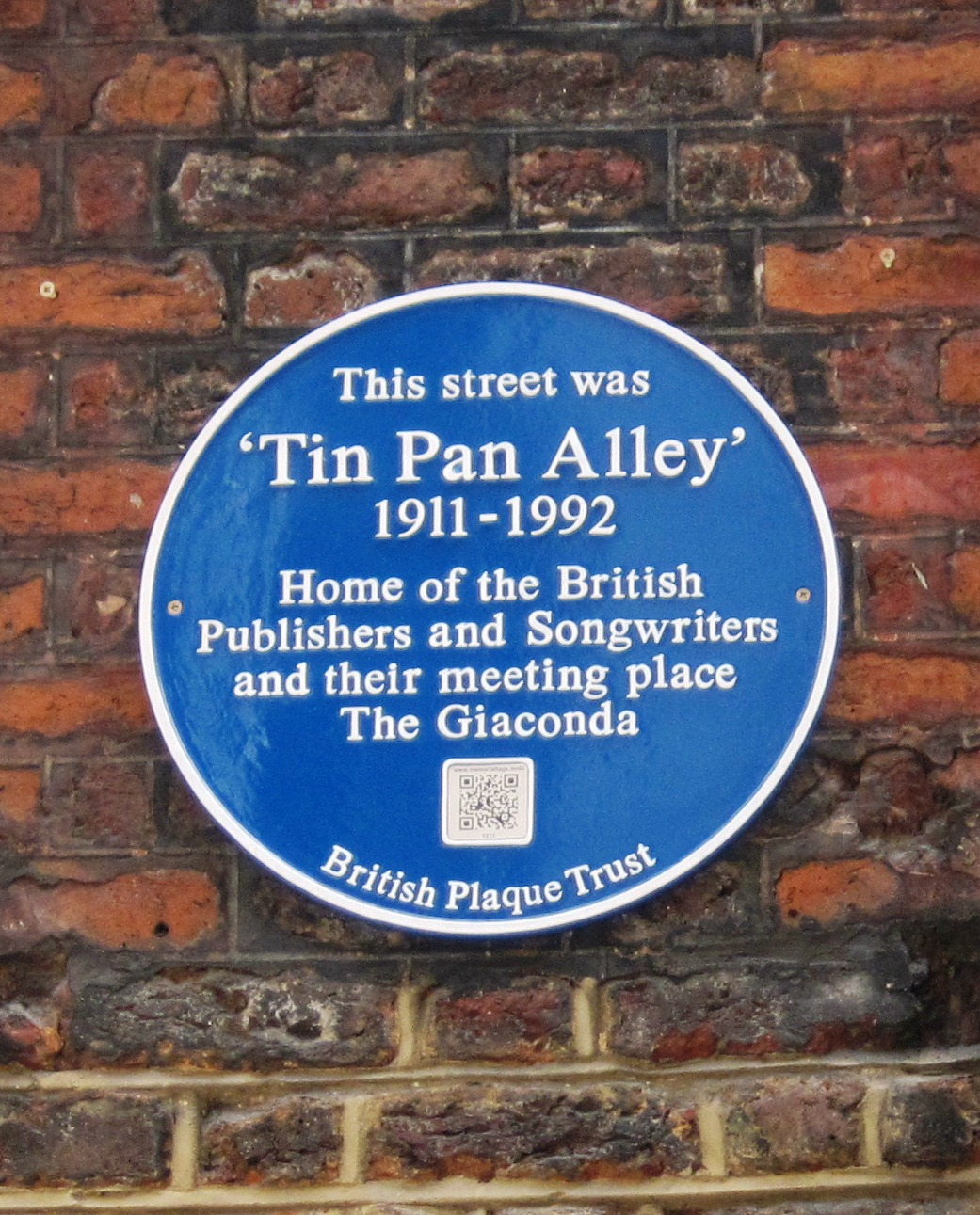
A blue plaque at No. 9, the former location of the Gioconda café

The Carter & Lewis songwriting partnership evolved when John Carter and Ken Lewis arrived in London in 1959 and decided "if you want to be in the music business, that [Denmark Street] was the place to be, that was the rule". Session musicians such as Jimmy Page and John Paul Jones regularly played in Denmark Street studios. In 1964, The Kinks recorded "You Really Got Me" in one of the basement studios.

Musicians often socialised in the Gioconda café at No. 9. David Bowie recruited his first backing band, The Lower Third, in the bar, while the Small Faces formed after the original members socialised at the Gioconda. Other regular patrons included David Bowie and Jimi Hendrix. Macaris was the first modern music shop to open on the street in 1965 followed by Top Gear Music, opening in 1969 and soon Denmark St became a hub for major guitarists of the day. In April 2014, a number of music industry figures, including disc jockey Mike Read, unveiled a blue plaque above the premises that included a QR Code to access a multimedia presentation about the history of music.

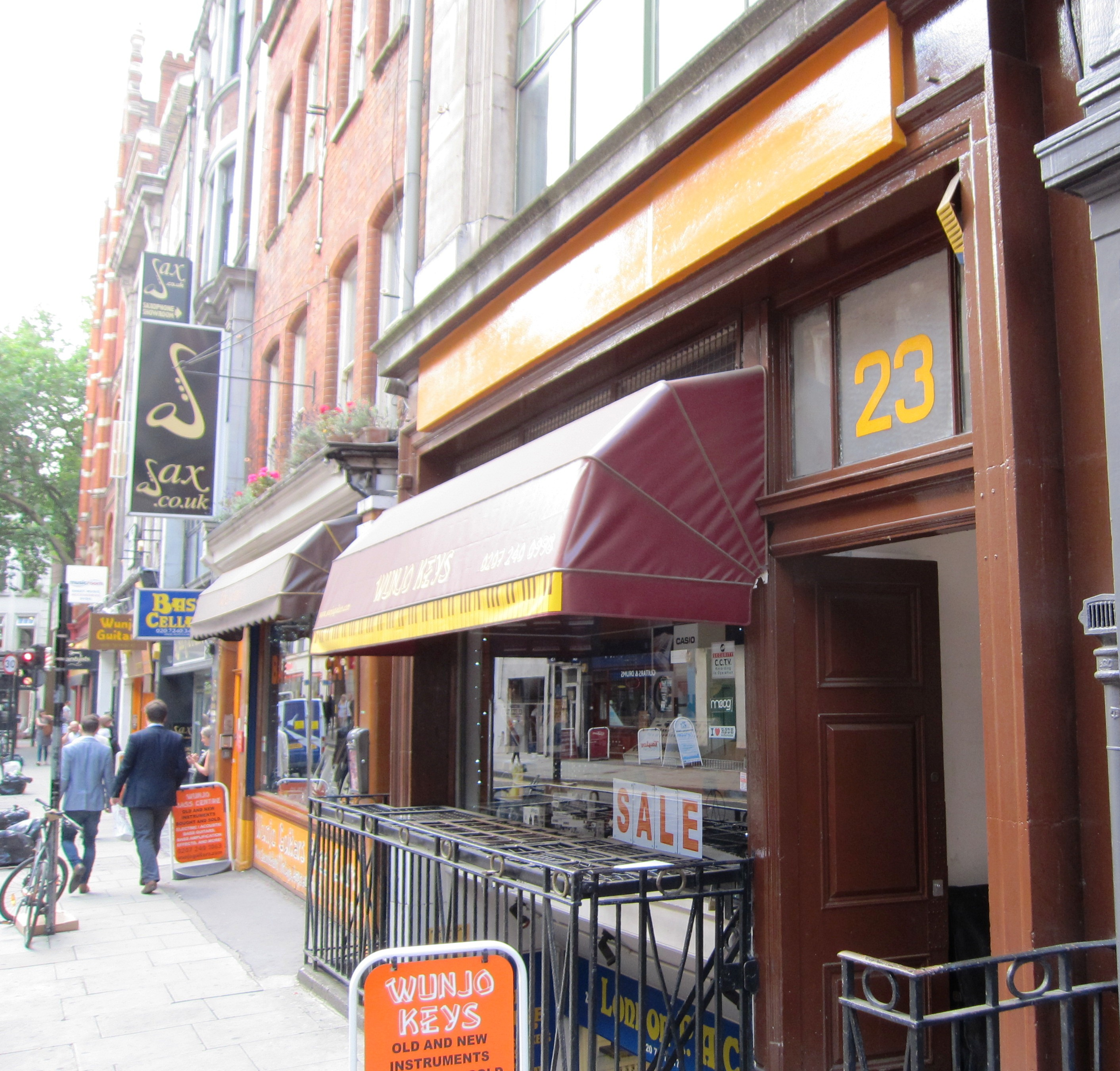
Number 23, where Pan Sound Studios (used by bands including The Who and Steamhammer) was located in the 1960s and Forbidden Planet started in 1978

==== 1970s ====
In 1970 Bernie Taupin and Elton John wrote "Your Song", John's first hit single, at No. 20 Denmark Street. John had started work at a music publisher in the street in 1963, and Taupin wrote the lyrics while sitting on the roof ("I sat on the roof and kicked off the moss") while waiting for John one morning. They mentioned the street in their 1974 song "Bitter Fingers", on the semi-autobiographical concept album Captain Fantastic and the Brown Dirt Cowboy. Also in 1970, a song named "Denmark Street" appeared on the Kinks' album Lola versus Powerman and the Moneygoround, Part One.

Manager Malcolm McLaren asked architect Ben Kelly to refurbish a basement rehearsal room he had bought from Badfinger. The Sex Pistols rehearsed in this room, lived above No. 6, and recorded their first demos there. Johnny Rotten drew cartoons of the members as graffiti which was later revealed in an archaeological survey of the site. Scott Gorham bought his first guitar with Thin Lizzy on Denmark Street. He had turned up at the audition with a Japanese Les Paul Copy—when he got the job, Phil Lynott took him shopping on Denmark Street. After being told several guitars were too expensive, he settled on a Sunburst Gibson Les Paul Deluxe. Andy's Guitars was established in 1978 at No. 27 and survived for many years before closing in 2007 because of increased shop rates.

The comic and science-fiction bookshop Forbidden Planet was established at No. 23 in 1978 before moving to New Oxford Street and becoming an international chain. When Douglas Adams attempted to attend a signing for the first The Hitch-Hiker's Guide to the Galaxy book in October 1979, the queue to the shop was so long that Adams thought a demonstration was taking place elsewhere.

==== 1980s–present ====
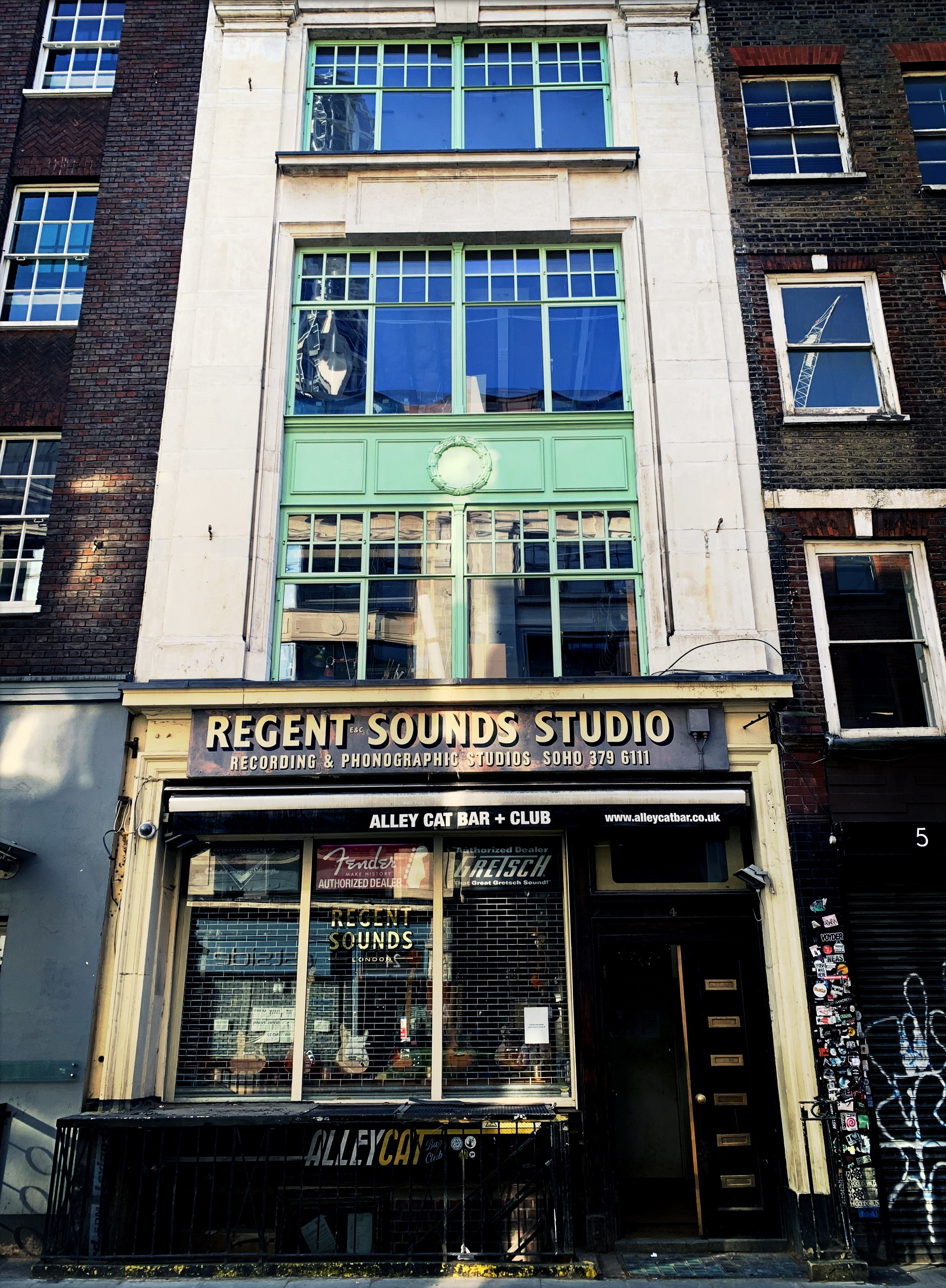
Regent Sounds Studio

By 1980, there were a number of unlicensed nightclubs operating on Denmark Place, running adjacent to the street. The clubs were housed in buildings that had previously functioned as a hostel for musicians, which adjoined a music shop on the street, and the fire brigade had insisted that a fire escape be fitted. By the time the clubs were in operation, the shop had closed and the fire escape had fallen into disrepair. 18 Denmark Place was home to two such clubs; on the first floor was "Rodo's", a salsa club popular with South American immigrants and above that "The Spanish Rooms" on the second floor which was a late-night bar frequented by locals including Irish and Jamaican immigrants.

On 16 August 1980 John Thompson, a local petty criminal, was ejected from The Spanish Rooms following a fight which may have been caused by a dispute about being overcharged. Thompson returned shortly thereafter and poured petrol into the ground floor of the building and ignited it. The Denmark Place fire resulting from this act of arson killed 37 people from eight different nationalities and was described as the worst fire in London in terms of loss of life since World War II. Thompson was imprisoned having been convicted of murder and died in prison in 2008 on the anniversary of the tragedy.

Numbers 1–3 had become a Job Centre by the 1980s, specialising in vacancies for the catering industry. The serial killer Dennis Nilsen worked there and brought in a large cooking pot, in which he had boiled his victims heads, as a utensil for preparing a Christmas 1980 party.

The last major music publisher in the street, Peer Music, moved from No. 8 in 1992, completing the gradual transformation of premises from publishers to instrument stores. In May 1990, Andy Preston, owner of Andy's Guitars, set up a traders association and attempted to have the street re-branded as "Music Land", similar to Drury Lane being marked Theatreland and Gerrard Street as Chinatown. Helter Skelter was set up as a bookshop dedicated to music titles in 1995 by Sean Body. The shop operated at the old Essex Music and Regent Sound building at No. 4 until rising rents forced it to close in 2004.

== Redevelopment ==
In 2009, Denmark Street was identified in English Heritage's "Heritage at Risk" register as being at risk in view of the nearby development of Crossrail. Particular attention was drawn to No. 26, which is a Grade II listed building. In 2010, Camden London Borough Council identified the street and adjacent properties as a Conservation Area.

In 2013, the council announced that Denmark Street would be redeveloped by the architectural firm ORMS as part of a major development in conjunction with the Crossrail construction work around Tottenham Court Road tube station and Centre Point. The proposed development includes the construction of an 800-seat subterranean performance venue. Numbers 1–6 and 17–21 Denmark Place, which run parallel along the back of the street, and the York and Clifton Mansions will be demolished, along with partial demolition of No. 21 Denmark Street, which was where KPM Music offices was located, and was prominently displayed in the dark green album art that consisted only of the KPM logo in the upper left and the address at the bottom right.

The scheme has been condemned by the local music industry and shopkeepers. Writer Henry Scott-Irvine launched a petition to stop the planned redevelopment, which has gathered 10,000 signatures. In an interview to Mojo, Scott-Irvine said "This should be stopped", adding that Denmark Street "should be given full heritage status like Covent Garden Market, Hatton Garden and Savile Row". He discovered that, although demolition was scheduled to start in late 2014, the plans were approved by the newly elected borough council. Consolidated Developments, developers for the new site, stated they were "committed to preserving and enhancing the rich musical heritage of Tin Pan Alley".

The 12 Bar Club was at No. 26 Denmark Street, a small live music venue with a capacity of about 100 people which was established in 1994. The building was originally stables, built in 1635, before becoming a blacksmiths until after World War I. It closed in January 2015 as part of the redevelopment work, while the actual smithy (forge) in which it had operated was retained intact as a historic building, being moved temporarily by crane after stabilization so that construction could be carried out beneath it, then replaced in its original position. After the 12 Bar Club's closure and clearance of Enterprise Studios on Denmark Place, a group of musicians and supporters squatted in the club's premises and staged a demonstration in the street, protesting against redevelopment. Former owner of Creation Records, Alan McGee supported the protestors, saying "you really couldn’t say a bad word against any of them. And they know the law, so they can't just be thrown out of there." However, a report in The Independent judged the protest to be misguided, as most shops along the street were still trading. Opened in 2022, a new and enlarged venue "The Lower Third" has been constructed on the site, incorporating the previous 12 Bar Club/"forge" building as one of its function rooms.

== Current occupants ==
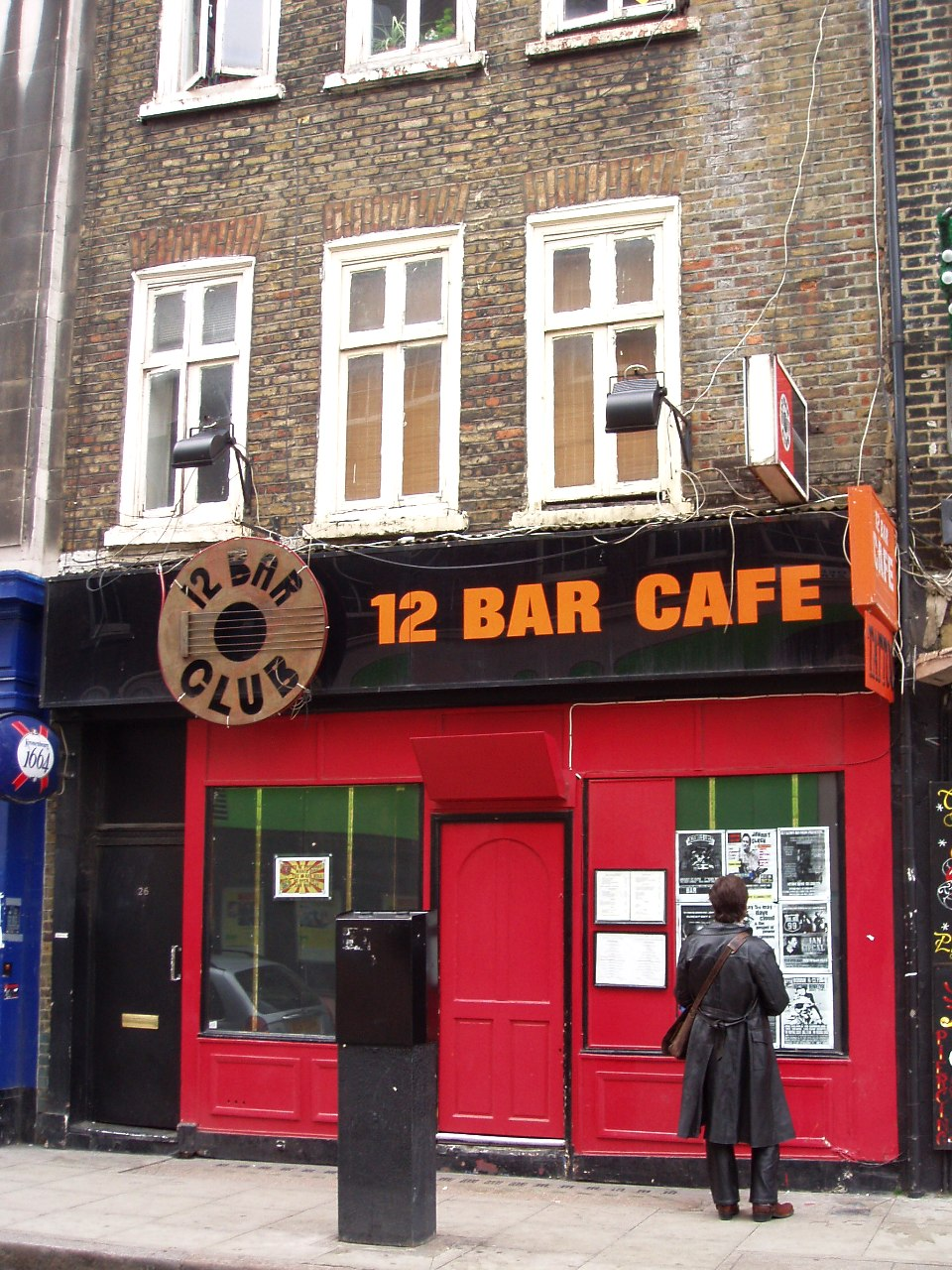
12 Bar Club was based at No. 26 between 1994 and 2015.

On the corner of the street with Charing Cross Road is Chris Bryant's Musical Instruments. Denmark Street Guitars claims to have over 3,000 instruments in stock and to have the largest selection of guitars in the UK. Regent Sounds, formerly the recording studio, which specialises in Fender and Gretsch guitars and Essex Music at No. 4; the Alleycat Bar and Club sits in the basement below the store. No.Tom Vintage and Classic Guitars has a store at No. 6. Macaris, a guitar retailer, was established in 1958 and specialises in Gibson models. As well as their shop at No. 25, they have an additional shop nearby on Charing Cross Road.

The sheet music shop Argents is currently based at No. 19. It was founded by The Zombies' Rod Argent as a keyboard shop and was previously based next door, at No. 20. Since then it has undergone two changes of owners and now specialises in sheet music and DVD sales, covering a wide variety of styles including jazz and classical.

Rose, Morris & Co have been established in Denmark Street since 1919. Originally based at No. 11, they now occupy No. 10 in the former offices of Southern Music Publishing. The company became the first British distributor of Rickenbacker guitars in 1962, which had a surge in popularity after musicians noticed the Beatles' John Lennon playing one. Rose Morris purchased instruments directly from Rickenbacker's factory instead of their sales office, in order to keep up with demand. The models that were ordered by Rose Morris from Rickenbacker and that were then sold and distributed in Great Britain, Australia and New Zealand had unique model designations such as the Rose Morris '1996', the equivalent of a Rickenbacker 325 model but with f-foles, or the Rose Morris '1999' model, the equivalent of a Rickenbacker 4001 bass guitar.

There has been a recording studio in the basement of No. 22 since Tin Pan Alley Studios was established in 1954. It was founded by session violinist Ralph Elman, and was previously the premises of the Acid Jazz Records label. In 2013, producer Guy Katsav took over management of the premises, renaming them Denmark Street Studios.

As of 7 August 2025, No 20 is home to "B.R.A.T - beautifully romanticised accidentally traumatized". B.R.A.T is a Store and Fan Club; a vision of Yungblud. The space is a fan club and store where fans can buy merch, grab coffee/beer, attend art classes, play pool, and connect in a creative space celebrating self-expression.

== Cultural references ==
The office and attic flat of private detective Cormoran Strike was located above the 12 Bar Club. The entrance is described as a "nondescript, black-painted doorway ... to the left of the 12 Bar Café."

== Listed buildings ==
Denmark Street has eight Grade II listed buildings. Though the refurbishment plans allow modernisation of these buildings, the council are keen to ensure that the affected properties remain solely in use for the music industry. A report added, "Music industry activities make a fundamental contribution to the special character of Denmark Street and support associated retail provision."

Number	ID	Grade	Date listed	Description
5	1271975	II	14 May 1974	Terraced house of 1686–9 with 20th century shopfront.
6	1271976	II*	24 October 1951	Terraced house of 1686–9 with later shopfront.
7	1433295	II*	24 October 1951	Terraced house of 1686–9 with later shopfront.
9–10	1271978	II	14 May 1974	Terraced house of 1686–9 with later shopfront.
20	1271980	II	14 May 1974	Terraced house of 1686–9 with later shopfront. Connects with 16, Denmark Place.
26	1271982	II	14 May 1974	Terraced house of early 18th century with later shopfront.
27	1271983	II	14 May 1974	Terraced house of late 17th century, with late 18th century frontage and 3rd storey.
