= The Happiness Boys =

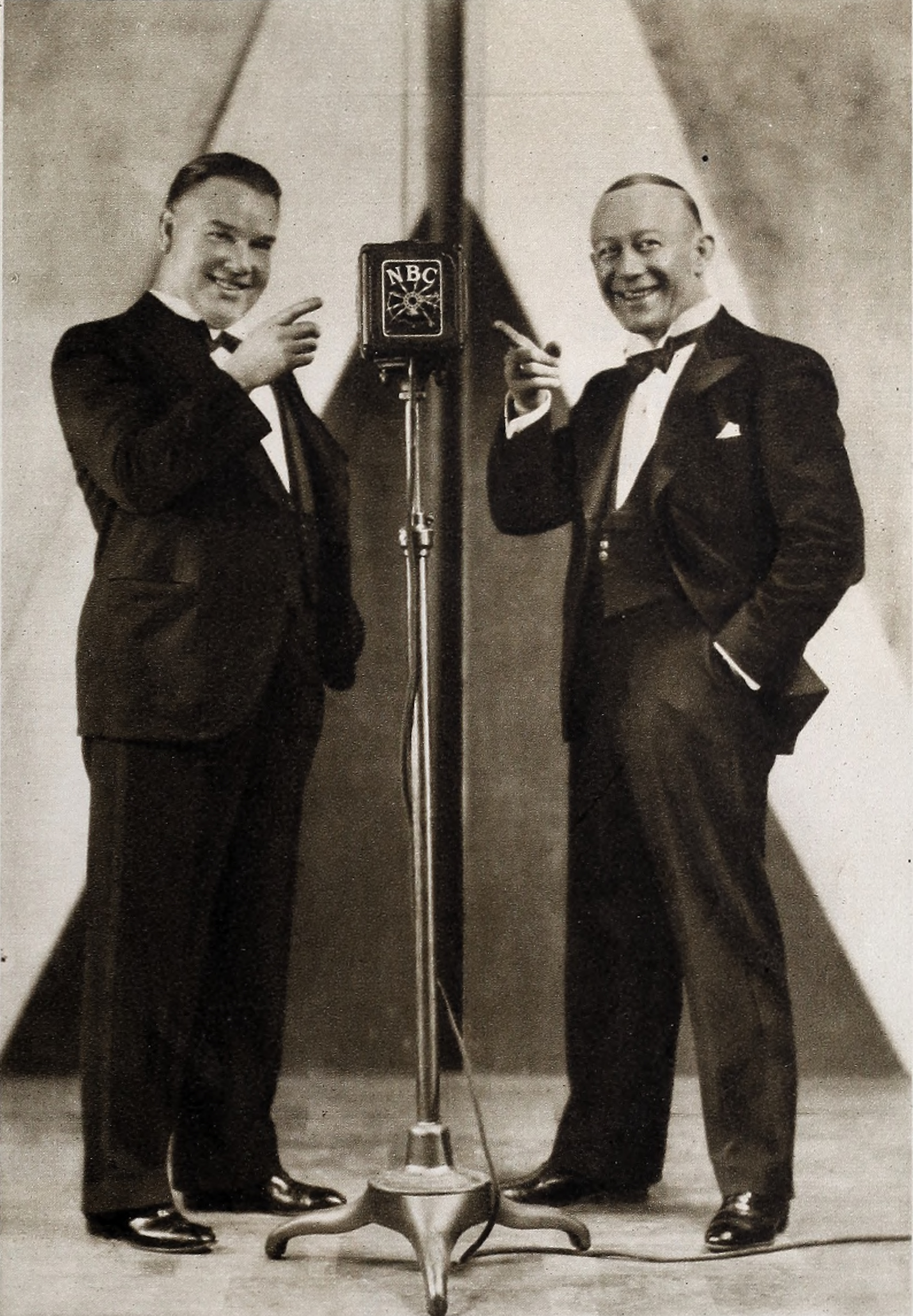
Billy Jones (left) and Ernie Hare (right)

The Happiness Boys was a popular radio program of the early 1920s. It featured the vocal duo of tenor Billy Jones (1889-1940) and bass/baritone Ernie Hare (1883-1939), who sang novelty songs.

== Career ==
Jones and Hare were already established as soloists on phonograph records. One of Jones's better solos was "Mary Lou", while Hare scored with the Yuletide novelty "Santa Claus Hides in the Phonograph". In 1920 recording executive Gus Haenschen had them sing an accompaniment on a Brunswick recording. They went on to do numerous recordings for Brunswick Records, Edison, and other companies. Similarities between the two singers were often noted: same height, same weight, birthdays a few days apart. Fred Rabinstein, who worked with Edison, recalled:

They had amused themselves by singing opera in a burlesque fashion, as they [later] did in their 1922 record of "Operatic Syncopation"...They seemed to have everything in common except that Jones was a bachelor (he took a wife after his mother's death) and Hare was married, with a little girl named Marilyn, who was to serve for a short time as Jones's singing partner after her father's death in 1939... both had mothers whose maiden names were Roberts; both were five feet and seven inches tall; both had voices of operatic calibre that perfectly complemented each other, and both had had operatic experience.

Jones and Hare began on radio October 18, 1921 on WJZ (Newark, New Jersey), where they were sponsored by the chain of Happiness Candy stores. Listeners mailed in their comments about the singers on cards supplied to retailers by Happiness Candy.

Beginning August 22, 1923, the Happiness Boys broadcast on New York's WEAF, moving to NBC from a run from 1926 to 1929. The duo sang popular tunes, mostly light fare and comic songs, and they engaged in humorous repartee between numbers. Their theme song was "How Do You Do" (1924). However, only the words to this song were new at that time. The melody had been used for a variety of other songs in the past and is still used in the camp favorite "If You're Happy and You Know It (Clap Your Hands)".

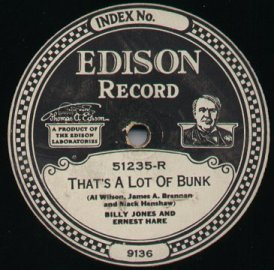
Edison Records "Diamond Disc" label, early 1920s, featuring the Happiness Boys

Dave Kaplan was usually the team's pianist on records. Kaplan was in charge of Edison's popular music division (and led the company's house dance bands "Kaplan's Melodists", the anagrammatical "McNalpak's Dance Orchestra", and "Atlantic Dance Orchestra"), but his contract as Edison's bandleader did not restrict his piano accompaniment work on other labels; he was so identified with Jones and Hare that they were jocularly referred to as "The Happiness Boys with Dave Kaplan at the Piano" in a single phrase. The banjoist on the team's records was usually Harry Reser, soon to lead his own band. Fannie Heinline, regarded as the best American female banjoist at the turn of the century, made guest appearances on The Happiness Boys as banjoist and vocalist.

By 1928, Jones and Hare were the highest paid singers in radio, earning $1,250 ($20,000 today) a week. They also made highly successful personal appearances in the United States and Europe. (They mention the European tour fondly in their recording of "We Don't Like It, Not Much".)

Jones and Hare specialized in comic songs that commented on trends and popular culture. When the song "Collegiate" swept the country and prompted a host of similar tunes, Jones and Hare countered with "We Ain't Never Been to College". Gracious living and social propriety were skewered in Jones and Hare's "Etiquette Blues". America's fascination with radio triggered the pungent parody "Twisting the Dials", probably the very first comedy sketch of its kind: Billy and Ernie simulate tuning a radio and getting snatches of random radio programs (Ernie's stentorian recitation of "Gunga Din" interrupted by Billy singing a fast Hawaiian song; Billy saccharinely introducing children's storyteller "Daddy Scarem" [Ernie], who turns out to be pretty grim; an incomprehensible boxing match, etc., punctuated by frequent time-outs for station identifications and time signals).

One of their most pointed satires, recorded with a full orchestra, was "We Can't Sleep in the Movies Anymore". Jones and Hare demonstrate how talking pictures have changed a restful evening in a theater into a noisy onslaught of "sneezes, squawks, and squeals". The lyrics also note that the actors' voices seldom matched their silent screen images:

HARE: The sheik is from the ghetto. I thought he came from Spain.
JONES: His voice is high falsetto! And he sounds like he's in pain!

Jones and Hare kidded the "talkies", but were among the first to appear in the new sound films. They starred in an early Vitaphone short, The Happiness Boys (1927), and were featured in A Movietone Divertissement (MGM, 1928).

Radio's "Happiness Boys" changed their identities and allegiance whenever they changed sponsors. Jones and Hare became "The Flit Soldiers" (1928, for Standard Oil's Flit insecticide), "The Interwoven Pair" (for Interwoven Socks, 1930–33), and "The Taystee Loafers" (for Taystee Bread, 1936), but they were known professionally as the Happiness Boys between these engagements. Toward the end of the 1930s they were sponsored by Sachs Furniture, over New York station WMCA.

When Hare became ill in early 1939, his 15-year-old daughter Marilyn Hare filled in for him at the microphone, allowing the act to continue as "Jones and Hare." Ernie Hare died on March 9, and Marilyn joined WMCA full-time on March 19. She kept singing and joking with Jones for almost a full year. In March 1940 a talent scout for Republic Pictures offered her a movie contract, and she left for Hollywood.

Billy Jones died within the year, on November 23, 1940.

== Legacy ==
In 1953, a classic vaudeville performance by the Happiness Boys was included in The Ford 50th Anniversary Show, a live television audience of 60 million persons (broadcast live over the NBC and CBS networks). The audio of the Happiness Boys was accompanied by a pantomime performance by Mary Martin and Ethel Merman.

Billy Jones and Ernie Hare's music was recently reissued on the Living Era CD (AJA 5628), How Do You Do?, which brings together two dozen of their more popular hits, including "Barney Google" (lyrics by Billy Rose), "Does the Spearmint Lose Its Flavor on the Bedpost Overnight?" (1924, revived in 1959 by Lonnie Donegan), "I've Never Seen a Straight Banana", "Etiquette Blues", "I Miss My Swiss (My Swiss Miss Misses Me)", "Twisting the Dials", "The Village Blacksmith Owns the Village Now", "Yes! We Have No Bananas" (Billy Jones solo), and "She's the Sweetheart of Six Other Guys" (parody of "Sweetheart of Sigma Chi").

== Bibliography ==
- Hoffmann, Carty, and Riggs, Billy Murray, The Phonograph Industry's First Great Recording Artist
- Roger D. Kinkle, The Complete Encyclopedia of Popular Music and Jazz, 1900-1950
- Tim Gracyk, The Encyclopedia of Popular American Recording Pioneers: 1895-1925

== Listen to ==
- 13 radio shows of Jones and Hare
- Turtle Services: Billy Jones and Ernie Hare sing "How Do You Do?" (1925)
- Turtle Services: Billy Jones and Ernie Hare sing "Old King Tut" (1923)
- "Since Henry Ford Apologized to Me" (1927), lyrics by Billy Rose in 1922
- "You Tell Her--I Stutter"
