= I've Never Seen a Straight Banana =

1926 novelty song written by Ted Waite

"I've Never Seen a Straight Banana" is a novelty song from 1926, written by Ted Waite. A short film was made in 1926 in the Phonofilm sound-on-film process with music hall comedian Dick Henderson (1891–1958) singing it.

In 1927, it was made popular by Fred Waring and his band Waring's Pennsylvanians who recorded it.

Later versions were recorded by The Happiness Boys, Jimmy Edwards, Tiny Tim (recorded in 1976 by producer Richard Barone, released 2009), and Brita Borg.

A series of films, entitled "Together: A Series of Films by Jeff Feuerzeig" (presented by Google+ and Pride Toronto) used "I've Never Seen a Straight Banana" as the opening and closing music for Pride Toronto's 2012 celebration. The recording by The Happiness Boys was also featured in The Mrs Bradley Mysteries in its 1998 pilot episode, which dealt with a queer character.
