= Edison Records =

Early record label

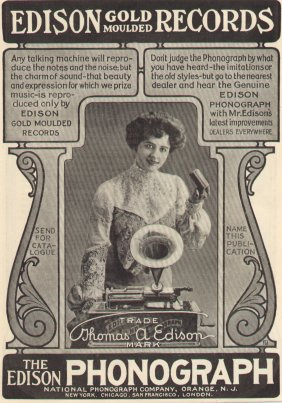
- 1903 advertisement
- Parent company: Thomas A. Edison, Inc.
- Founded: 1888; 138 years ago
- Founder: Thomas Edison; Jesse H. Lippincott
- Defunct: 1929; 97 years ago
- Status: Defunct
- Distributor: Independent
- Genre: Various
- Country of origin: U.S.
- Location: West Orange, New Jersey

Edison Records was one of the early record labels that pioneered sound recording and reproduction, and was an important and successful company in the early recording industry.

== History ==
The first phonograph cylinders were manufactured in 1888, followed by Edison's foundation of the Edison Phonograph Company in the same year. The recorded "wax" cylinders, later replaced by Blue Amberol cylinders, and vertical-cut Diamond Discs, were manufactured by Edison's National Phonograph Company from 1896 on, reorganized as Thomas A. Edison, Inc. in 1911. Until 1910 the recordings did not carry the names of the artists. The company began to lag behind its rivals in the 1920s, both technically and in the popularity of its artists, and halted production of recordings in 1929.

== Before commercial mass-produced records ==
Thomas A. Edison invented the phonograph, the first device for recording and playing back sound, in 1877. After patenting the invention and benefiting from the publicity and acclaim it received, Edison and his laboratory turned their attention to the commercial development of electric lighting, playing no further role in the development of the phonograph for nearly a decade. Edison's original phonograph recorded on sheets of tinfoil and was little more than a crude curiosity, although one that fascinated much of the public. These earliest phonographs were sold mainly to entrepreneurs who made a living out of traveling around the country giving "educational" lectures in hired halls or otherwise demonstrating the device to audiences for a fee. The tinfoil phonograph was not fit for any real practical use and public interest soon waned.

== Beginnings of the commercial record industry ==
In 1887, Edison turned his attention back to improving the phonograph and the phonograph cylinder. The following year, the Edison company debuted the Perfected Phonograph. Edison introduced wax cylinders approximately 4 1/4 inches (11 cm) long and 2 1/4 inches (5.7 cm) in external diameter, which became the industry standard. They had a maximum playing time of about 3 minutes at 120 RPM, but around the turn of the century the standard speed was increased to (first 144) and then 160 RPM to improve clarity and volume, reducing the maximum to about 2 minutes and 15 seconds. Several experimental wax cylinder recordings of music and speech made in 1888 still exist.

The wax entertainment cylinder made its commercial debut in 1889 (a relatively well-preserved and freely available example from that year is the Fifth Regiment March, played by Issler's Orchestra). At first, the only customers were entrepreneurs who installed nickel-in-the-slot phonographs in amusement arcades, saloons and other public places. At that time, a phonograph cost the equivalent of several months' wages for the average worker and was driven by an electric motor powered by hazardous, high-maintenance wet cell batteries. After more affordable spring-motor-driven phonographs designed for home use were introduced in 1895, the industry of producing recorded entertainment cylinders for sale to the general public began in earnest.

There is a frequent misconception of the records being made of "wax", as many later records were mostly being made of other material of similar feel. Before the plastic amberol records were introduced, their predecessor, Edison "Gold-Moulded" records (1902-1912), were made of a metallic soap compound, which had the qualities of wax. Earlier still, brown wax records (c.1889-1902) were occasionally made of wax derived from animal fat, but the inconsistency of the compound led Edison to use other material in an effort to improve the quality of the early records.

Blank records were an important part of the business early on. Most phonographs had or could be fitted with attachments for the users to make their own recordings. One important early use, in line with the original term for a phonograph as a "talking machine", was in business for recording dictation. Attachments were added to facilitate starting, stopping, and skipping back the recording for dictation and playback by stenographers. The business phonograph eventually evolved into a separate device from the home entertainment phonograph. Edison's brand of business phonograph was called The Ediphone; see Phonograph cylinder and Dictaphone. Edison was one of the first companies to record the African-American quartet the Unique Quartet.

== Mass-produced cylinders ==
Whistle and I'll Wait for You
Performed by Ada Jones for Edison Records in 1909.

A significant technological development at the Edison Laboratories was devising a method to mass-produce pre-recorded phonograph cylinders in molds. This was done by using very slightly tapered cylinders and molding in a material that contracted as it set. To Edison's disappointment, the commercial potential of this process was not realized for some years. Most of the regional Edison distributors were able to fill the small early market for recordings by mechanical duplication of a few dozen cylinders at a time. Molded cylinders did not become a significant force in the marketplace until the end of the 1890s, which was when molding was slow and was used only to create pantograph masters.

Before using metal cylinders though Edison used paraffin paper. Mass-producing cylinders at the Edison recording studio in New Jersey largely ended the local Edison retailers early practice of producing recordings in small numbers for regional markets, and helped concentrate the USA recording industry in the New York City – New Jersey area, already the headquarters of the nation's Tin Pan Alley printed music industry.

An Edison Standard Phonograph (model B) playing a Good Evening, Caroline gold moulded record

In 1902, Edison's National Phonograph Company introduced Edison Gold Moulded Records, cylinder records of improved hard black wax, capable of being played hundreds of times before wearing out. These new records were under the working title of "Edison Hi-Speed Extra Loud Moulded Records", running at the speed of 160 RPM instead of the usual (ca. 1898–1902) speed of 144 RPM or (ca. 1889–1897) 120 RPM. Until ca. 1898, Edison's speed was 125 RPM.

In 1908, Edison introduced a new line of cylinders (called Amberol) playing 4 rather than 2 minutes of music on the same sized record, achieved by shrinking the grooves and spacing them twice as close together. New machines were sold to play these records, as were attachments for modifying existing Edison phonographs.

In November 1912, the new Blue Amberol Records, made out of a type of smooth, hard plastic similar to celluloid invented by Edison labs, were introduced for public sale. The first release was number 1501, a performance of Rossini's overture to his opera Semiramide, performed by the American Standard Orchestra. The plastic Blue Amberol records were much more durable than wax cylinders. The Edison lab claimed a 3000+ playback quota for the Blue Amberol. In that same year, the Edison Disc Record came out.

In 1910, artists' names began to be added to the records; previously, Edison's policy was to promote his cylinders (and up until 1915, discs) based on the recognition of composers and the works recorded thereon in lieu of the performers themselves.

Thomas A. Edison, Inc., successor to the National Phonograph Company, continued selling cylinders until they went out of the record business in November 1929. However, from January 1915 onwards these were simply dubs of their commercial disc records intended for customers who still used cylinder phonographs purchased years before. The book, "Edison Cylinder Records, 1889-1912," by Allen Koenigsberg, APM Press, lists and dates all American Edison wax cylinders (2-4 min.); ISBN 0-937-612-07-3.

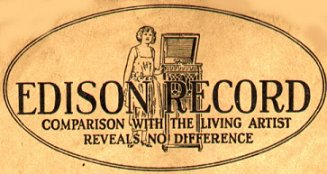
Edison Records logo from 1910s sleeve

== Materials and process used to manufacture cylinder records ==
Cylinders that are mentioned from 1888 are sometimes called "yellow paraffin" cylinders, but these cylinders are not paraffin, which is a soft oily wax and would not hold up over many plays. They could be a number of formulas tested by Jonas Aylsworth, Thomas Edison's chemist. Most of the surviving 1888 recordings would be formulated from a combination of ceresin wax, carnauba wax, stearic acid, and beeswax. A record of this kind has a cigar-like smell and is physically very soft when first molded. In a year's time, the record would harden quite considerably. To play these first cylinders, the model B reproducer must be used. The other later reproducers (such as C) were only designed for the harder black "wax" records. A later reproducer would shave down the grooves very fast, and the sound would be lost forever.

In late 1888, metallic soaps were tried. At first, a lead stearate was used, but in the summer months, these records started to sweat and decompose. In 1889, Aylsworth developed an aluminum wax, using acetate of alumina and stearic acid with sodium hydroxide added as a saponifying agent. It was found these records were much more durable. Problems arose, however, since there was no tempering agent and hot weather caused these records to decompose. Two problems contributed to this, stearic quality varied from different makers; Aylsworth purchased some from Procter & Gamble and found it contained too much oleic acid. Stearic acid without a tempering agent takes on moisture, and after many experiments, it was found that Ceresine was ideal. To make the wax hard, sodium carbonate was added. Even so, a few batches of records still had problems and became fogged. The fog problem arose from acetic acid left in the wax and was solved when higher temperatures were used to make sure the acetic acid was boiled out of the wax. As such, the records from 1889 to 1894 are a reddish-brown color due to the long cooking time. By 1896, Edison started using hydrated alumina in place of acetate of alumina. The use of hydrated alumina (sheet aluminum dissolved in a mixture of sodium carbonate, sodium hydroxide, and distilled water) made better records, and the wax could be manufactured in a shorter period of time. Using hydrated alumina resulted in more desirable blanks, with fewer defects and shorter production time.

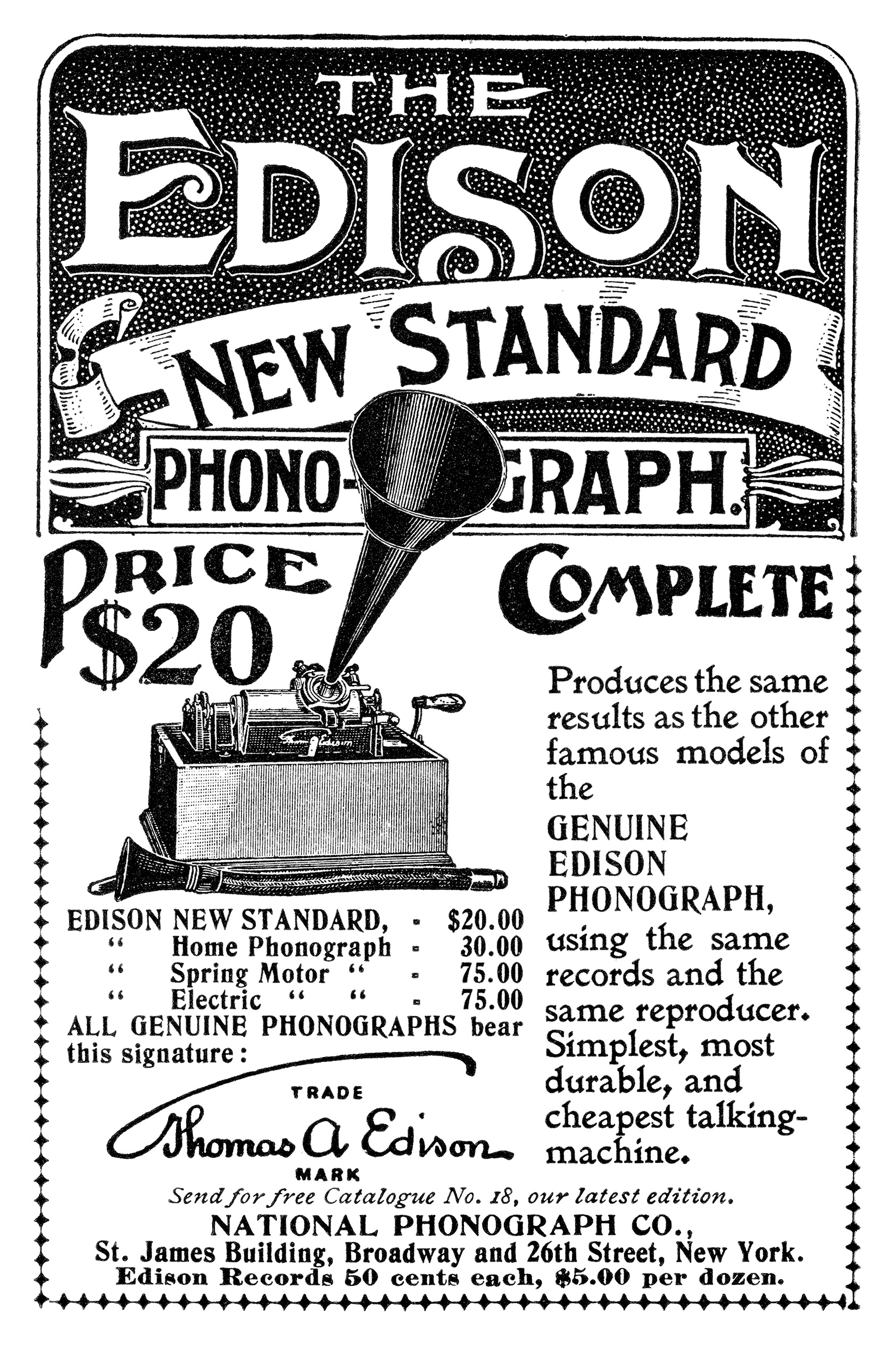
Edison New Standard Phonograph ad, 1898

The Columbia Phonograph Company used Edison recording blanks until 1894. The North American Phonograph Company was dissolved in the fall of 1894, and Edison quit supplying blanks to Columbia, who had purchased 70,000 blanks from 1889 to 1894. Columbia was frantic to find a solution to make cylinder blanks in-house, and the recipe for making Edison's wax was a well-kept secret. Thomas MacDonald experimented with wax alloys with poor results: the records fogged or decomposed in the summer, just like the early Edison blanks. The Columbia company had a deadline to either supply recordings, or have their contracts canceled and be sued for loss of records. Columbia resorted to hiring old Edison Phonograph Works employees, such as Mr. Storms, in order to learn their secrets. Unfortunately for Columbia, the names of the components used by Edison were not labeled with ingredients but were instead indicated by number (i.e. 1, 2, 3) keeping the identities of these components a secret. Paraffin, ceresine, and ozokerite all look similar, making the tempering agent even more difficult to identifify by the wax mixer. Wax mixers were given instructions on how much of each numbered component to put in the mixture, and how to process it, but no idea as to what the ingredients actually were. It took over a year for Columbia to come up with the formula for cylinders. Columbia placed an ad in the Soap Makers' Journal for a practical man to work with metallic soaps. Adolph Melzer, a soap manufacturer from Evansville, Indiana took the job. Melzer devised a formula comparable to Edison's with the exception of the tempering agent (using cocinic acid, derived from coconut oil instead.)

In 1901 The Gold Molded (originally spelled Moulded) process was perfected for commercial use by Thomas Edison and Jonas Aylsworth (Edison's Chemist) with input from Walter Miller, the Recording Manager of Edison Records. This discussion was gleaned from facts provided by Walter Miller, Jonas Aylsworth, Thomas Edison, Adolphe Melzer, and Charles Wurth.

At first, no method of mass production was available for cylinder records. Copies were made by having the artist play over and over or by hooking two machines together with rubber tubing (one with a master cylinder and the other a blank) or copying the sound mechanically. By the late 1890s, an improved mechanical duplicator, the pantograph, was developed which used mechanical linkage. One mandrel had a playback stylus and the other for recording, while weights and springs were used to adjust the tension between the styli to control recording volume and tracking.

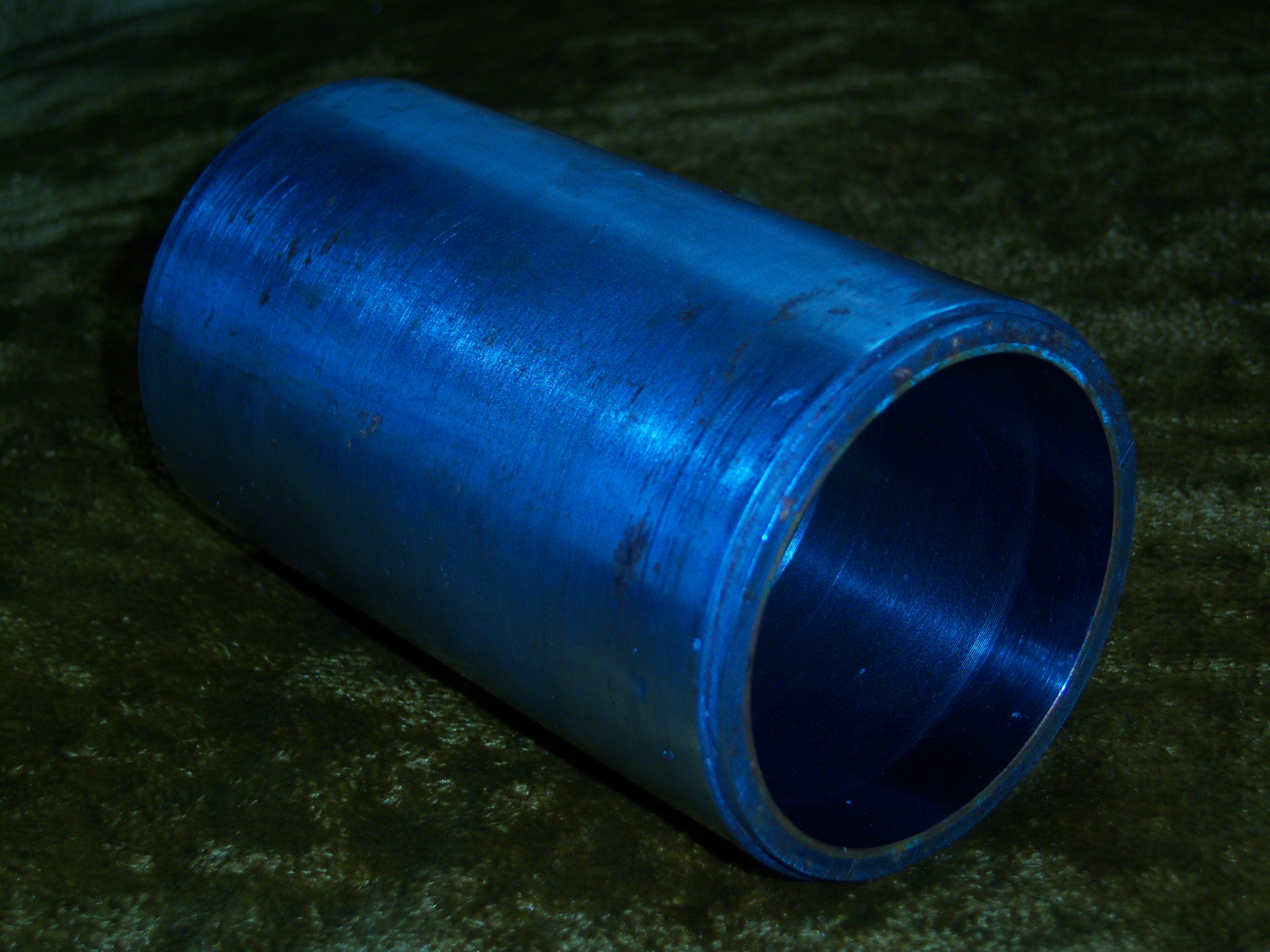
This is an example of a wax cylinder mold. Note the grooves on the inside and machined backup shell.

The Edison team experimented with Vacuum Deposited Gold masters as early as 1888, and it has been reported that some brown wax records were molded, although this is unproven. The Edison Record, "Fisher Maiden", was an early record that was experimented with for the process. The 1888 experiments were not successful due to the fact the grooves of the cylinders were square, and the sound waves were saw-tooth-shaped and deep. The records came out scratchy and it was very time-consuming.

The Gold Molded process involved taking a wax master and putting it in a vacuum chamber. The master record was put on a spinning mandrel, a pump removes the air from a glass bell jar, and two pieces of gold leaf were attached to an induction coil. Electrical current was applied, and a magnet was spun around the outside to turn the mandrel, and the gold vaporized applying a very thin coating on the master. This master was put on a motor in a plating tank and copper was used to back the gold. The master record was melted, then taken out of the mold to reveal a negative of the grooves in the metal. The master cylinder had to have the wider feed as the grooves shrink in length through each process. The master mold is used to create "mothers" and these are then further processed to make working molds.

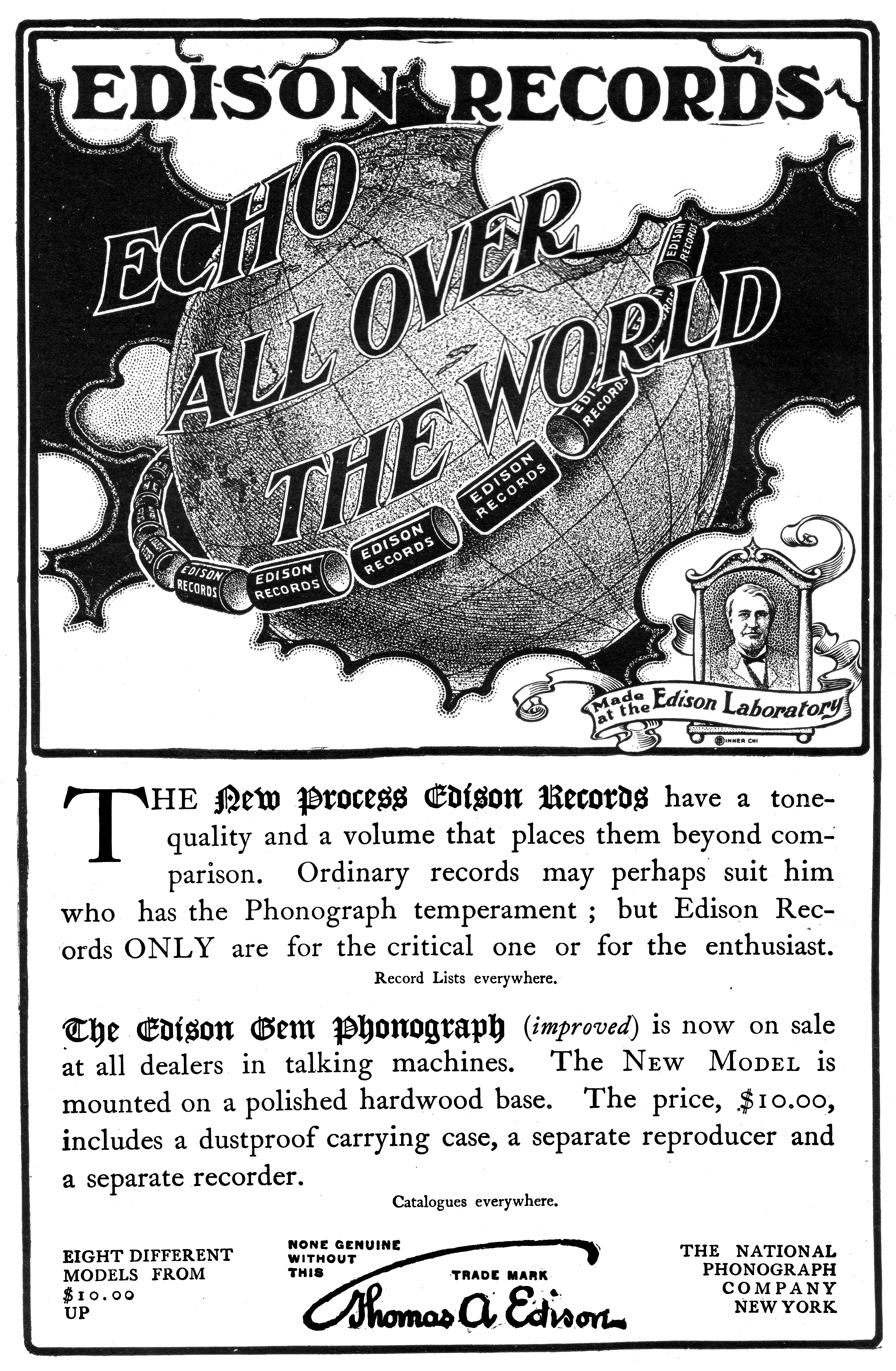
Ad for Edison Records and Gem Phonograph, 1900

The Gold molded record used an aluminum-based wax, like the post-1896 Edison brown wax. However, carnauba wax was added, as well as pine tar and lampblack resulting in a black, shiny, durable record. The molds with mandrels placed in the center were heated and dipped in a tank of the molten wax. These were removed and trimmed while still hot and put on a table then put in lukewarm water. The water caused the records to shrink in diameter so that they could be removed. The records were then trimmed, dried and cleaned, then later put on warm mandrels for 2 hours where they shrank evenly. Jonas Aylsworth developed this formula.

In 1908, Edison introduced Amberol Records which had a playing time of just over 4 minutes. The process of making the finished record was essentially the same as the Gold Molded records, however, a harder wax compound was used. In 1912, celluloid was used in place of wax, and the name was changed to Blue Amberol, as the dye was blue. What differed from earlier process was that a steam jacketed mold with an air bladder in the center was used. Celluloid tubing was put in the mold and the end gate was closed. The rubber bladder expanded the celluloid to the side of the heated mold and printed the negative record in positive on the celluloid. The bladder was then deflated, and cold air was used to shrink the tubing so the celluloid print could be removed. The printed tubing was put in a plaster filler. When the plaster was hard the cylinders were then baked in an oven, then ribs made on the inside of the plaster with knives. The records were cleaned and then packaged.

== Edison disc records ==
I Want to Go Back to Michigan
Performed by Billy Murray for Edison Records in 1914.

Shine On, Harvest Moon
1909 Edison Records recording of husband-and-wife team Jack Norworth and Nora Bayes' 1908 hit Shine On, Harvest Moon with Ada Jones and Billy Murray.

In October 1912 the Edison Diamond Disc Record was introduced. Edison Laboratories had been experimenting with disc records for some 3 years, as the general public seemed to prefer them to cylinders. The thick Edison Discs recorded the sound vertically in the groove at a rate of 150 grooves-per-inch (GPI) rather than the typical laterally-cut groove of around 100 GPI, which gave 10-inch (250 mm) Edison discs a longer playing time (up to five minutes) than laterals and could only be played to their full advantage on Edison Diamond Disc Phonographs. This combination produced audio fidelity superior to any other home record playing system of the time. However, Edison Discs and phonographs were more expensive than their competitors'. This, together with the incompatibility of the Edison system with other discs and machines, had an adverse effect on Edison's market share. Nonetheless, Edison Discs for a time became the third best selling brand in the United States, behind Victor and Columbia Records.

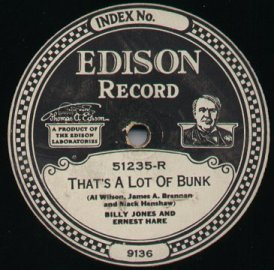
Edison Records "Diamond Disc" label, "That's a Lot of Bunk", sung by Ernie Hare and Billy Jones (early 1920s)

With World War I various materials used in Edison Discs came in short supply, and many discs pressed during the war were made hastily and with inferior materials, notably a reformulated phenolic finishing varnish that was introduced when European chemical supplies were cut off. This resulted in problems with surface noise even on new records, and Edison's market share shrank.

Prior to the war Edison Records started a marketing campaign, hiring prominent singers and vaudeville performers to perform alongside and alternating with Edison records of their performances played on top-of-the-line "Laboratory Model" Edison Diamond Disc Phonographs. At various stages during the performances, all lights in the theater would be darkened and the audience challenged to guess if what they were hearing was live or recorded; accounts often said that much of the audience was astonished when the lights went back up to reveal only the Edison Phonograph on stage. According to a book published by the Edison company titled Composers and Artists whose Art is Re-Created by Edison's New Art (ca. 1920), the first such comparison test or "tone test" as Edison copywriters referred to them, took place at Carnegie Hall on April 28, 1916, with Marie Rappold of the Metropolitan Opera providing the live vocal performance.

After the war, disc quality improved substantially as better quality ingredients became available again, and in the brief postwar boom Edison regained status in the industry. Sales for Edison discs peaked in 1920, but declined incrementally thereafter. In 1926, an attempt at reviving interest in the Edison Disc was with a 450-GPI long-playing disc, acoustically recorded and still spinning at 80 rpm, with times of 24 minutes per 10-inch (250 mm) disc and 40 for a 12-inch (300 mm) disc, but problems occurred (notably with broken groove walls and overall low volume, often only 40% of that of the regular discs), and the disc failed. In August 1927, discs began to be electrically recorded, making Edison the last major label to adopt electrical recording (over two years after Victor, Columbia, and Brunswick had converted from acoustical recording). Concurrently, Edison tried to freshen its catalogues by recording popular dance bands such as those of B. A. Rolfe and Harry Reser (whose "Six Jumping Jacks" group appeared on Edison as "Earl Oliver's Jazz Babies"), the Goldman Band conducted by founder Edwin Franko Goldman, jazz performers Eva Taylor and Clarence Williams, and radio personalities like Vaughn De Leath and "The Radio Franks" (Frank Bessinger and Frank Wright). Classical performers who became Edison artists in the late 1920s included pianists E. Robert Schmitz and Moriz Rosenthal, violinists Arcadie Birkenholz and Erna Rubinstein, the Roth Quartet, tenors José Mojica and Giovanni Martinelli, and baritone Mario Basiola. Despite these efforts and constant experimentation at the Edison plant and their New York studio (including moving from 79 Fifth Avenue to more modern premises at 261 Fifth Avenue in early 1929), record sales and morale continued to drop – in fact, one Edison executive later asserted that Edison discs had lost money from the beginning – and although Edison Diamond Discs were available from dealers until the company left the record business in late October 1929, the last vertically cut direct masters were recorded in the early summer of that year.

In 1928 the Edison company began plans for making "Needle Cut" records; by which they meant standard lateral cut discs like the "78s" marketed by almost every other company of the time. Although several hundred lateral cut masters and stampers had been made by January 1929, the first "Needle Cut" discs were not released until August, and new titles were issued at a rate of only a few at a time each week for ten weeks before the company ceased record sales, thus only about 100 titles ever commercially appeared. The audio fidelity was often comparable to the best of other record companies of the time, but they sold poorly not only because Edison's market share had declined to the point where it was no longer one of the leading companies and Edison had few distributors compared to leaders like Victor, Columbia, and Brunswick, but also because their brief existence did not allow them to establish any kind of market presence.

After Edison Records closed down in October 1929, many of the employees were transferred to manufacturing radios. Edison's remaining wax masters and thousands of metal master molds, including unissued experimental recordings dating to several years before Diamond Discs were commercially introduced (many in a never-released 12-inch (300 mm) format), were purchased by Henry Ford, and became part of the collection of the Henry Ford Museum. They were recently deaccessioned by the museum and sent to the Edison Historic Site (National Park Service) in New Jersey. Some of the Edison catalogue is in the public domain and available for download at the Library of Congress website.

== See also ==
- Edison Disc Record
- Lists of record labels
