= Helter Skelter Publishing =

Publisher and former bookstore in London specialising in books about rock music

Coordinates: 51°30′55″N 0°7′45″W

- Founded: 1995
- Founder: Sean Body
- Country of origin: United Kingdom
- Headquarters location: London
- Distribution: Turnaround Publisher Services
- Publication types: Books
- Nonfiction topics: Music
- Official website: helterskelterpublishing.com

Helter Skelter Publishing is a British publisher specialising in rock music.

Helter Skelter was founded as a bookshop by Sean Body in 1995, who specifically chose the location of 4, Denmark Street as it had previously housed Regent Sounds Studios, which had recorded early work by the Rolling Stones. The shop specialised in books and fanzines covering Bob Dylan, which at one point accounted for 40% of its sales. It also sold sheet music and music-related artwork. Despite predictions it would not appeal to a wide market, and be "a boys' anorak paradise", a report in The Independent suggested that 20% of customers were women.

Although the shop was popular, it was unable to cope with a 40% rise in shop rates, and it closed at the end of 2004. Body died of leukemia in April 2008. However, the name survives as a publishing company.
