= Gioconda coffee bar =

Coordinates: 51°30′54″N 0°07′46″W

- Interactive map of Gioconda coffee bar

Restaurant information
- Location: London, United Kingdom

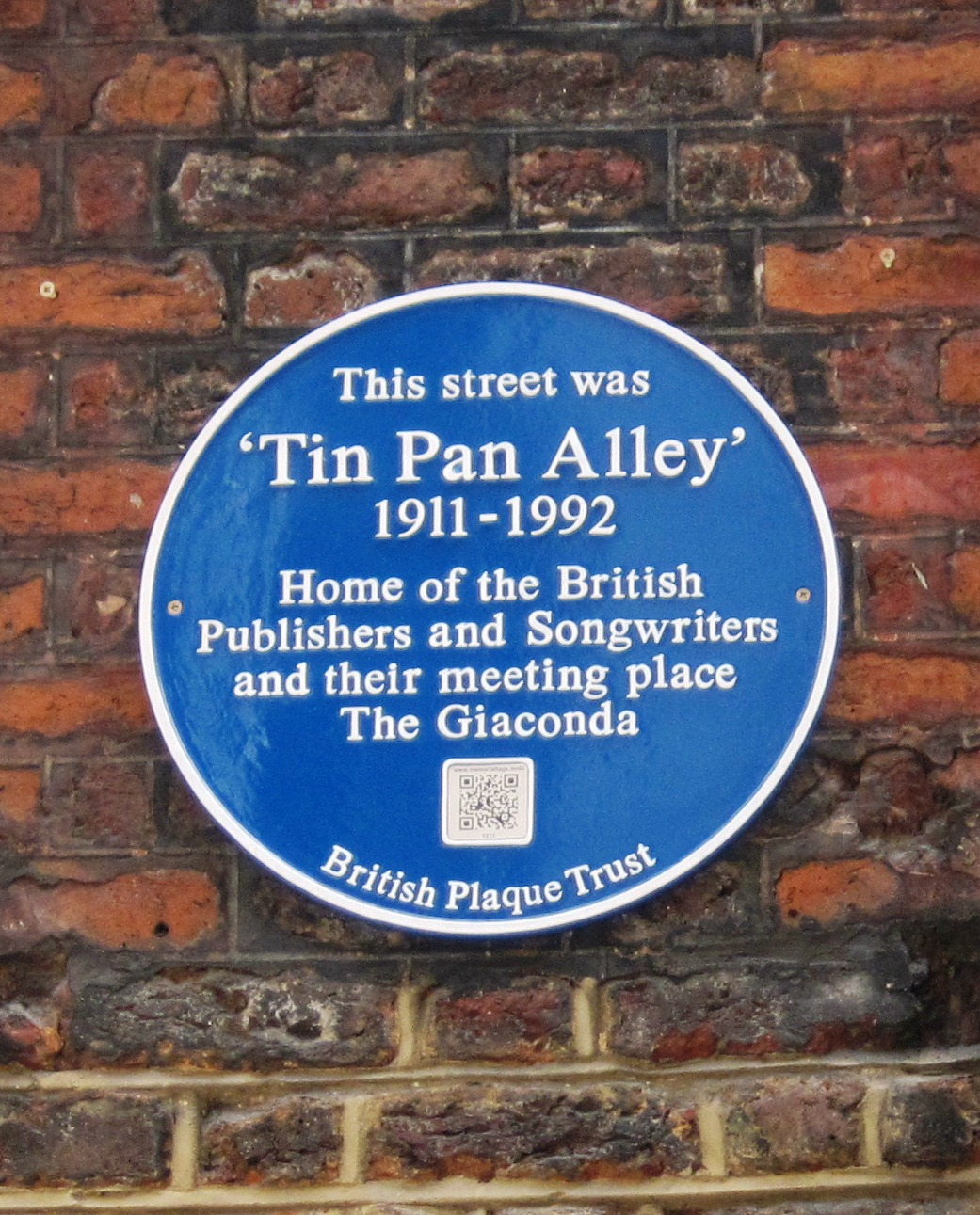
A commemorative blue plaque was placed the site of the cafe at number 9 in 2014. (Note: Note that photographs confirm that the original cafe was spelt Gio- rather than Gia-, which now appears on the plaque. See blog by Peter Watts: "Denmark Street and regeneration: slow death or triumphant rebirth?".)

La Gioconda was a cafe at 9 Denmark Street in London's Tin Pan Alley, where musicians such as David Bowie, Dana Gillespie and Elton John would eat and meet other people in the music business. The premises subsequently became the Barino coffee bar. The name was then revived as the Giaconda Dining Room in 2008 which expanded to the Giaconda Dining Rooms before being renamed La Giaconda and then closing in 2014.
