= Box and Cox Publications =

Music agency

Box and Cox Publications, known as Box & Cox, was a music publisher who had offices at number 7, Denmark Street. Their greatest hit was "I've Got a Lovely Bunch of Cocoanuts," written with Irwin Dash under the pseudonym "Fred Heatherton."

The principals were Elton Box (1903–1981) and Desmond Cox (1903–1966). Bill Martin, who worked in "Tin Pan Alley" at the time, recalled their manner, 'And they had a piano. You would be invited to play them your song, and then afterwards, one of them would say, "What do you think Mr Box?" and the reply would be "I'm not sure Mr Cox". They then asked you if you had a song like "A Lovely Bunch of Coconuts". They would do things for a laugh and give you money...'

Box and Cox also collaborated with Dash using the pseudonym "Jack Spade," on "Your Baby Has Gone Down the Plug Hole," also known as "The Mother's Lament." The song was most famously recorded under the former title by Martin Carthy in 1963, and under the latter title by Cream in 1967 (attributed to "Traditional").
