= I've Got a Lovely Bunch of Coconuts =

1944 song by Fred Heatherton

"I've Got a Lovely Bunch of Cocoanuts"

Song by Fred Heatherton
- Label: Box and Cox Publications
- Songwriter: Fred Heatherton

"I've Got a Lovely Bunch of Coconuts" is a novelty song composed in 1944 (as "I've Got a Lovely Bunch of Cocoanuts") by Fred Heatherton, a songwriting pseudonym for a collaboration of English songwriters Harold Elton Box and Desmond Cox, with Lewis Ilda (itself a pseudonym of American songwriter Irwin Dash). The song was published by Box and Cox Publications (ASCAP).

The song celebrates the coconut shy (coconut toss) at funfairs (carnivals), and the chorus of "Roll or bowl a ball a penny a pitch" is based on the call of the showman "standing underneath the flare" (of gaslight), inviting the public to play. The ball is tossed or bowled (as in cricket) or pitched at the coconuts with the object of knocking one off its stand.

== Recording history ==
In 1950, the song was a top-ten hit in the United States for Freddy Martin and his Orchestra with vocalist Merv Griffin and sold over three million copies. The following year, it was a number-25 hit for Danny Kaye.

It was a staple song of the Billy Cotton Band Show on British radio and television. The song is still played over the public address at Cambridge United football matches after home wins.

Swedish performer Povel Ramel wrote a Swedish version of the song in 1950. This version, "Far jag kan inte få upp min kokosnöt" ("Dad I can't crack my coconut open"), has little to do with the original. It is sung by a little boy who, in the course of his attempts to open his resilient coconut, demolishes the family's furniture, disfigures his mother, and finally blows their house up. This version also features prominently in the film My Life as a Dog (1985), as well as in the Swedish language version of The Lion King. The song is known in Finland from the versions by Kipparikvartetti and M. A. Numminen, "Kuinka saisin rikki kookospähkinän", which feature a similar tragicomic story.
