= John Purcell (physician) =

English physician

- Born: 1674? Shropshire
- Died: 19 December 1730
- Occupation: Physician

John Purcell (1674? – 19 December 1730) was an English physician.

== Biography ==
Purcell was born in Shropshire about 1674, and in 1696 became a student of medicine in the university of Montpellier, where he attended the lectures of Pierre Chirac, then professor of medicine, for whom he retained a great respect through life (Of Vapours, p. 48). After taking the degrees of bachelor and licentiate, he graduated M.D. on 29 May 1699. He practised in London, and in 1702 published ‘A Treatise of Vapours or Hysteric Fits,’ of which a second edition appeared in 1707. The book is dedicated to ‘the Honourable Sir John Talbott, his near relation,’ and gives a detailed clinical account of many of the phenomena of hysteria, mixed up with pathology of the school of Thomas Willis. His preface is the latest example of the type of apology for writing on medicine in the English tongue so common in books of the sixteenth century. He shows much good sense, pointing out that there are no grounds for the ancient belief that the movement of the uterus is related to the symptoms of hysteria, and supports the statement of Thomas Sydenham that similar symptoms are observable in men. Their greater frequency in women he attributes to the comparative inactivity of female life. He recommends crayfish broth and Tunbridge waters, but also seeing plays, merry company, and airing in the parks. In 1714 he published, at J. Morphew's, ‘A Treatise of the Cholick,’ dedicated to his relative, Charles, duke of Shrewsbury, of which a second edition appeared in 1715. This work shows less observation than his former book, but contains the description of an autopsy which he witnessed at Montpellier, giving the earliest observation in any English book of the irritation produced by the exudation in peritonitis on the hands of the morbid anatomist. On 3 April 1721 he was admitted a licentiate of the College of Physicians of London. He died on 19 December 1730.
