= Ceresin =

Wax derived from ozokerite

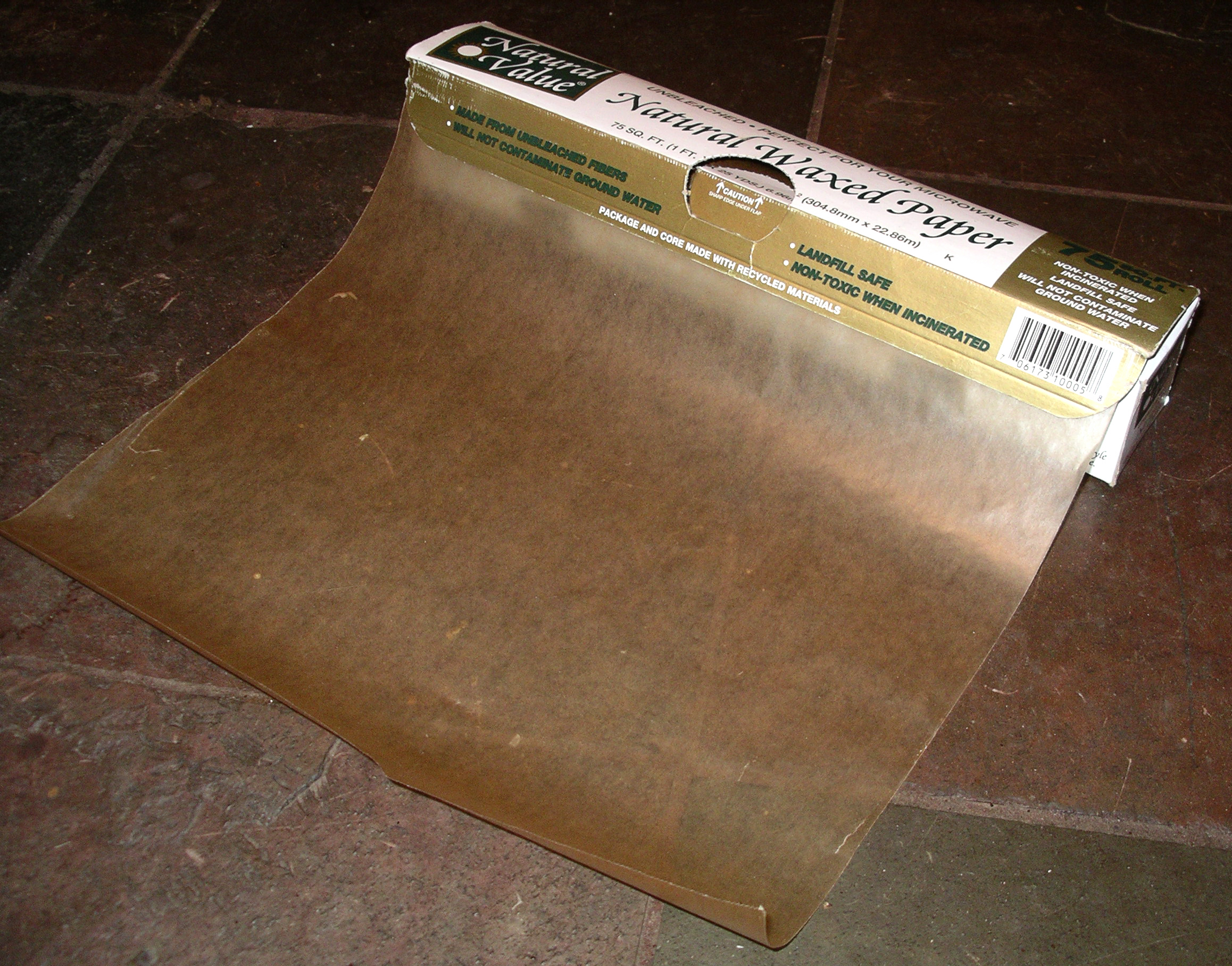
Waxed paper

Ceresin (also cerin, cerasin, cerosin, ceresin wax or ceresine) is a wax derived from ozokerite by a purifying process.

The purifying process of the ozokerite commonly comprises a treatment with heat and sulfuric acid, but other processes are also in use.

Uses include:

- An alternative to beeswax in ointments
- (Historic) laboratory-supply bottles for small amounts of hydrofluoric acid, which were made of ceresin wax; this was before polyethylene became commonplace.
