= Ernie Hare =

American musical artist

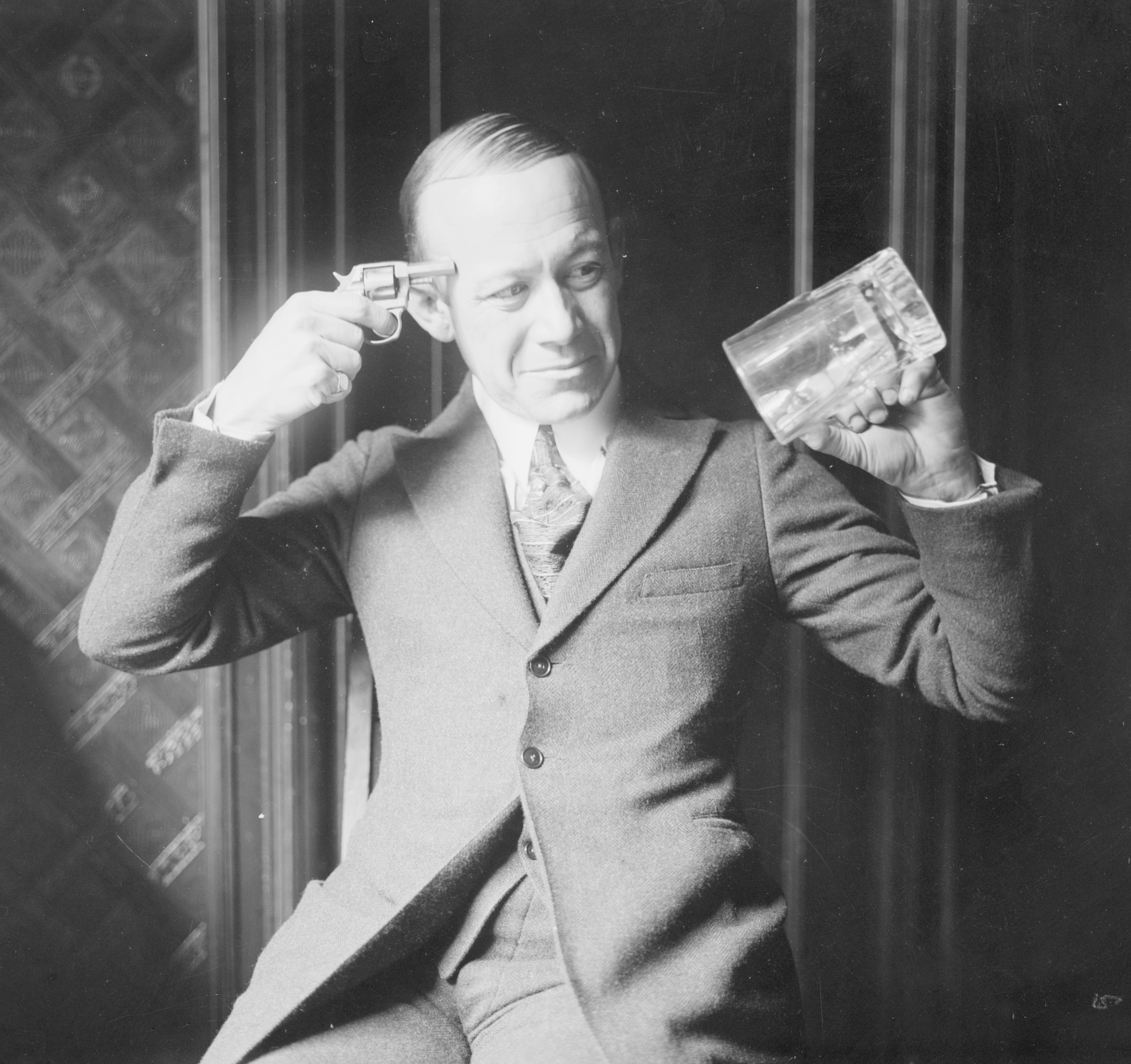
- Hare mimes his displeasure over Prohibition

Background information
- Born: Thomas Ernest Hare; March 16, 1883
- Died: March 9, 1939 (aged 55) Queens, New York City
- Occupation: Singer

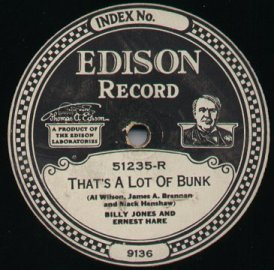
Edison Records "Diamond Disc" label (early 1920s) with Jones and Hare singing "That's a Lot of Bunk"

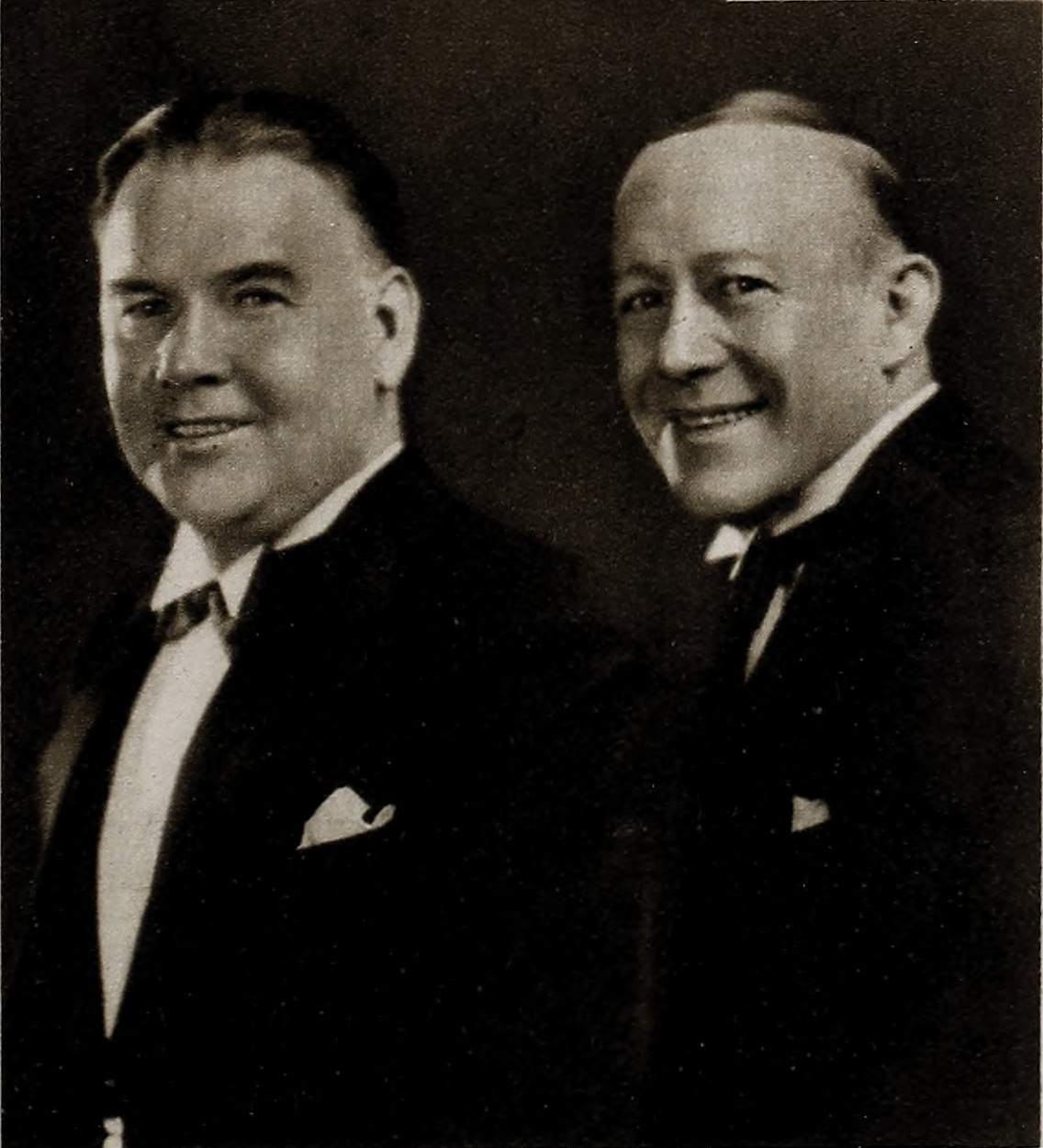
Ernie Hare with Billy Jones

Thomas Ernest Hare (March 16, 1883 – March 9, 1939) was an American singer who recorded prolifically during the 1920s and 1930s, finding fame as a radio star on the Happiness Boys radio program.

== Career ==
Hare's recording career began in 1918. He was Al Jolson's understudy in the Broadway musical Sinbad during 1919–20. He recorded with the Cleartone Four, the Crescent Trio, the Harmonizers Quartet, and the Premier Quartet. He made a series recordings with Al Bernard in the late 1910s and the start of the 1920s. As a soloist, he worked under a variety of names (Wallace Daniels, Arthur Grant, Henry Jones, Robert Judson, Walter Lang, Walter Leslie, Roy Roberts, Bob Thomas, Bob Thompson, "Hobo" Jack Turner, and Frank Mann).

After he met Billy Jones in 1919, they teamed in 1920 when Brunswick executive Gus Haenschen had them sing an accompaniment on a Brunswick recording. They went on to do numerous recordings together for Brunswick, Edison and most other major U.S. record companies of the era. Similarities between the two singers were often noted: same height, same weight, and birthdays a few days apart.

They began on radio October 18, 1921 on WJZ in Newark, New Jersey. Sponsored by Happiness Candy, they were heard as the Happiness Boys beginning August 22, 1923 on New York's WEAF, moving to NBC for a run from 1926 to 1929. As the Happiness Boys, they sang popular tunes, mostly light fare and comic songs, with jokes and patter between numbers.

By 1928, they were the highest-paid singers in radio, earning $1,250 a week. After Hare's death in 1939 of bronchopneumonia, Jones continued to perform, teaming in 1939–40 with Hare's 16-year-old daughter, Marilyn Hare (1923–1981). Jones died November 23, 1940. Marilyn Hare went on to a career as an actress in films, Soundies, and television, and she also toured as a vocalist.

== See also ==
- The Happiness Boys

== Sources ==
- Hoffmann, Carty, and Riggs, Billy Murray, The Phonograph Industry's First Great Recording Artist
- Roger D. Kinkle, The Complete Encyclopedia of Popular Music and Jazz, 1900-1950
- Tim Gracyk, The Encyclopedia of Popular American Recording Pioneers: 1895-1925
