= Billy Jones (singer, born 1889) =

American musical artist

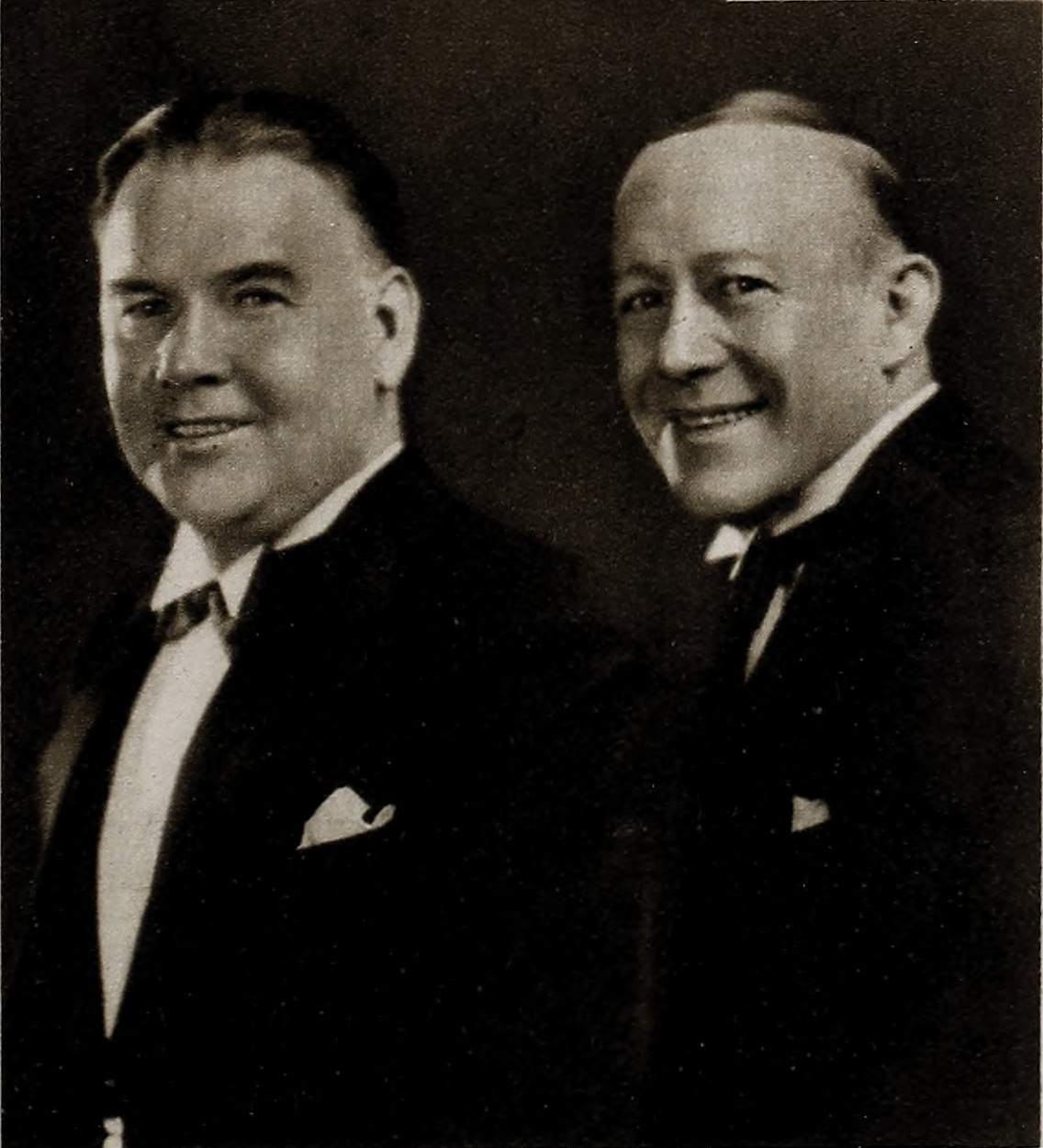
Billy Jones (left) with Ernie Hare

William Reese Jones (March 15, 1889 – November 23, 1940) was a tenor who recorded during the 1920s and 1930s, finding fame as a radio star on The Happiness Boys radio program.

Jones worked in such occupations as mining, banking, and blacksmithing before his 1918 recording debut. He recorded with the Cleartone Four, the Crescent Trio, the Harmonizers Quartet and the Premier Quartet, and he performed under a variety of names (Harry Blake, Billy Clarke, Lester George, Duncan Jones, Reese Jones, John Kelley, Dennis O'Malley, William Rees, Victor Roberts, Billy West, William West, and Carlton Williams).

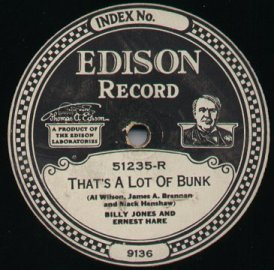
Edison Records "Diamond Disc" label (early 1920s) with Jones and Hare singing "That's a Lot of Bunk"

After he met Ernie Hare in 1919, they teamed in 1920 when Brunswick executive Gus Haenschen had them sing an accompaniment on a Brunswick Records recording. They went on to do numerous recordings together for Brunswick, Edison, and other companies.

They began on radio October 18, 1921 on WJZ (Newark, New Jersey). Sponsored by the chain of Happiness Candy stores, they were heard on The Happiness Boys program beginning August 22, 1923 on New York's WEAF, moving to NBC from a run from 1926 to 1929. As "The Happiness Boys", they sang popular tunes, mostly light fare and comic songs, and they joked with one another between numbers.

By 1928, they were the highest paid singers in radio, earning $1,250 a week. The partnership ended with Hare's death on March 9, 1939. Jones continued to perform, teaming with Hare's 16-year-old daughter, Marilyn Hare, in 1939-40. He died November 23, 1940, in Manhattan, of a heart attack, and is buried in Woodlawn Cemetery in The Bronx, New York City.

Among Jones' hits was "The grass is always greener in the other fellow's yard" which became the theme song of the "Big Brother Bob Emery " a children's program, first on radio, then on TV in both New York and Boston in the 1940s and 1950s.

Ain't We Got Fun?
Ain't We Got Fun?, recorded by Billy Jones in 1921 for Edison Records.

== See also ==
- The Happiness Boys

== Sources ==
- Hoffmann, Carty, Billy Murray, The Phonograph Industry's First Great Recording Artist
- Kinkle, Roger D., The Complete Encyclopedia of *Popular Music and Jazz, 1900-1950
- Gracyk, Tim, The Encyclopedia of Popular American Recording Pioneers: 1895-1925
- Joseph Dinneen. "How Bob Emery Became Big Brother to 12,000 Youngsters." Boston Globe, March 1, 1925, p. E6.
