= 1917 in radio =

List of years in radio	(table)
- … 1907; 1908; 1909; 1910; 1911; 1912; 1913; 1914; 1915; 1916; 1917; 1918; 1919; 1920; 1921; 1922; 1923; 1924; 1925; 1926; 1927 …
- In music 1914 1915 1916 1917 1918 1919 1920 In film 1914 1915 1916 1917 1918 1919 1920
- Art; Archaeology; Architecture; Literature; Music; Philosophy; Science; +...

The year 1917 in radio involved some significant events.

== Events ==
- 6 April – The United States enters World War I and by presidential order all the country's radio stations are taken over for naval use.
- Edwin Howard Armstrong, working as a captain in the Signal Corps (United States Army) in Paris, perfects the eight-tube superheterodyne circuit.
- Radio San Paolo, the Regia Marina (Italian Navy) Radiotelegraphic Station, is established in Rome.

== Births ==
- 20 March – Vera Lynn, English singer (d. 2020)
- 15 June – Charles Chilton, English radio presenter and producer (d. 2013)
- 6 September – Richard Durham, author and producer of Destination Freedom (d. 1984)
