= 1913 in radio =

List of years in radio	(table)
- … 1903; 1904; 1905; 1906; 1907; 1908; 1909; 1910; 1911; 1912; 1913; 1914; 1915; 1916; 1917; 1918; 1919; 1920; 1921; 1922; 1923 …
- In music 1910 1911 1912 1913 1914 1915 1916 In film 1910 1911 1912 1913 1914 1915 1916
- Art; Archaeology; Architecture; Literature; Music; Philosophy; Science; +...

The year 1913 in radio involved some significant events.

== Events ==
- 31 January – Edwin Howard Armstrong first demonstrates the employment of three-element vacuum tubes in circuits that amplify signals to stronger levels than previously thought possible and that could also generate high-power oscillations usable for radio transmission. On 29 October he applies for a United States patent covering the regenerative circuit.
- Spring – Lee de Forest utilizes the feedback principle operate a low-powered transmitter for heterodyne reception of the Federal Telegraph Company's arc transmissions.
- 12 November – The International Convention for the Safety of Life at Sea is convened in London and produces a treaty requiring shipboard radio stations to be manned 24 hours a day.
- Late – Lee de Forest is acquitted of stock fraud in connection with the Radio Telephone Company in the United States.
- The Marconi Company initiates duplex transatlantic wireless communication between North America and Europe for the first time, transmitting from Marconi Towers at Louisbourg, Nova Scotia, to Letterfrack in Ireland.
- The cascade-tuning radio receiver is introduced.
- Lee de Forest publishes a description of his Audion triode detecting or amplifying vacuum tube.

== Births ==
- 25 May – Richard Dimbleby, English broadcast news presenter (died 1965)
- 31 May – Peter Frankenfeld, German comedian (died 1979)
- 25 June – Cyril Fletcher, English comic monologuist (died 2005)
- 6 July – Gwyn Thomas, Welsh writer and broadcaster (died 1981)

== Deaths ==
- November 6 – Sir William Henry Preece, Welsh wireless telegraph engineer (born 1834)
