= 1903 in radio =

| List of years in radio | (table) |
- … 1893; 1894; 1895; 1896; 1897; 1898; 1899; 1900; 1901; 1902; 1903; 1904; 1905; 1906; 1907; 1908; 1909; 1910; 1911; 1912; 1913 …
- In music 1900 1901 1902 1903 1904 1905 1906 In film 1900 1901 1902 1903 1904 1905 1906
- Art; Archaeology; Architecture; Literature; Music; Philosophy; Science; +...

The year 1903 in radio involved some significant events.

== Events ==
- 19 January – The first west–east transatlantic radio broadcast is made from the United States to England.
- August – Preliminary Conference on Wireless Telegraphy held in Berlin.

== Births ==
- 17 January – Douglas Cleverdon, English radio producer and bookseller (d. 1987)
- 16 February – Norman Shelley, English radio actor (d. 1980)
- 31 August – Arthur Godfrey, American radio and television host (d. 1983)
- 1 October – Edward Archibald Fraser Harding, English radio producer (d. 1953)
- 29 December – George Elrick, Scottish bandleader and disc jockey (d. 1999)
