= 1919 in radio =

1919 in radio details the internationally significant events in radio broadcasting for the year 1919.

== Events ==
- 19 March – The first spoken word radio transmission from east to west across the Atlantic is made. The Marconi Company acquire the radio station facility at Ballybunion, a small seaside town in County Kerry in the southwest of Ireland, soon after the end of the First World War. From here, Marconi engineers W.T. Ditcham and H.J. Round, succeed in transmitting voice across the Atlantic from east to west for the first time. They use the call-sign Yankee X-ray Quebec (YXQ) and the first words were 'Hello Canada'. The transmission is received at Chelmsford and Louisburg, Nova Scotia, Canada.
- 17 October – The assets of Marconi Company's American operations are acquired by General Electric and are incorporated (along with the Pan-American Telegraph Company and assets already controlled by the United States Navy) as the Radio Corporation of America. Former American Marconi executive David Sarnoff is also brought over to the new company; he would become an influential figure at RCA and with the development of NBC and RKO.
- 28 October – On the first anniversary of the establishment of independent Czechoslovakia, the first radio programme of words and music is broadcast from the telegraph station at the Petřín lookout tower in Prague.
- c. October – Lee De Forest resumes broadcasting from the Bronx after a hiatus due to World War I. The station is given the designation 2XG. Records concerts are aired 5 times a week. The world's first known programme director is Richard Klein.

== Debuts ==
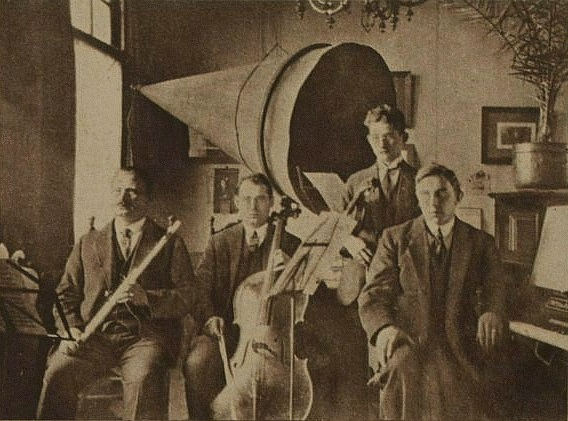
Musicians in the PCGG studio.

- 17 October – Dr. Frank Conrad begins broadcasting from experimental 8XK, located at his home at 7750 Penn Avenue in Wilkinsburg, Pennsylvania, USA, which a year later will inspire establishment of KDKA.
- 6 November – Hans Idzerda's PCGG in The Hague, Netherlands begins regular programming.
- 19 November – Experimental station 8ZAE (later KQV) is launched in Pittsburgh, Pennsylvania, USA.
- 1 December – Experimental station XWA (later CFCF, then CIQC, and finally CINW) is launched in Montreal, Quebec, Canada by the Marconi Company.
- c. December? – Following the conclusion of World War I, experimental station 1XE (later WGI) is re-launched in Medford Hillside, Massachusetts, U.S.A. (on the Tufts University campus) by Harold J. Power and the American Radio and Research Corporation (AMRAD).

== Births ==
- 17 January – Dallas Townsend, American broadcast journalist (died 1995)
- 21 January – Jinx Falkenburg, American radio and television talk show host (died 2003)
- 25 January – Edwin Newman, radio journalist (died 2010)
- 11 March – Hans Keller, Austrian-born musicologist (died 1985)
- 5 April – Charles Parker, English documentary producer (died 1980)
- 7 May – Eva Perón, née Duarte, Argentinian radio actress, later first lady (died 1952)
- 14 June – June Spencer, English radio actress (died 2024)
- 16 September – Lawrence Dobkin, American radio and television director, actor and screenwriter (died 2002)
- 11 December – Cliff Michelmore, English broadcast presenter (died 2016)
- Laure Leprieur (Madame Leprieur d'Agon-Coutainville), French radio quiz-setter (died 1999)

== See also ==
- Lee De Forest
- List of oldest radio stations
