= 1920 in radio =

1920 in radio details the internationally significant events in radio broadcasting for the year 1920.

== Events ==
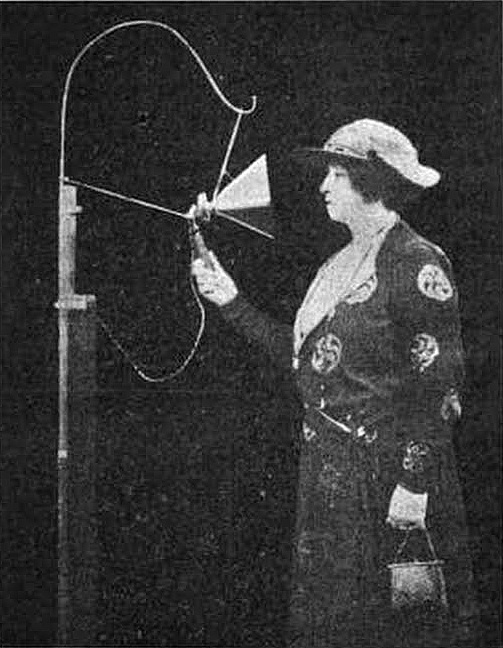
Nellie Melba sang two arias from Guglielmo Marconi's factory in Chelmsford, Essex, in England on June 15. The performance was sponsored by The Daily Mail newspaper in London.

- January
  - The first informal and spasmodic broadcasts in the United Kingdom are made by the Marconi Company from Chelmsford in England. These broadcasts include both speech and music.
  - Radio 2XG, which opened the previous year, is forced to close down after Lee de Forest moves the station from the Bronx (where it is licensed) to Manhattan (where it is not). De Forest responds by relocating the 2XG transmitter to San Francisco, where it is relicensed as 6XC, and commonly known as "The California Theater station".
- 23 February–6 March – The Marconi Company broadcasts from Chelmsford a series of 30-minute shows repeated twice daily. These include live music performances.
- 15 June – Australian soprano Dame Nellie Melba becomes history's first well-known professional performer to make a radio broadcast when she sings two arias as part of the series of Marconi broadcasts from Chelmsford in Britain.
- 20 August – Station 8MK in Detroit (modern-day WWJ) began broadcasts of regularly scheduled news bulletins and religious shows. The news is compiled from reports supplied by the Detroit News.
- 27 August – Sociedad Radio Argentina airs a live performance of Richard Wagner's opera Parsifal from the Teatro Coliseo in Buenos Aires. Only about twenty homes in the city have a receiver with which to tune into the broadcast.
- 2 November – KDKA broadcasts presidential election results in the evening using temporary call sign 8ZZ.
- November – The Marconi broadcasts from Chelmsford cease after it is claimed they interfere with aircraft and ship communications. They resume in 1922 regularly as 2MT.

== Births ==
- 14 January – George Herman, American journalist (d. 2005)
- 21 January – Peggy Lee, American singer, songwriter, composer and actress (d. 2002)
- 2 April – Ian Messiter, British panel game creator (d. 1999)
- 2 May – Joe "Mr Piano" Henderson, Scottish pianist, composer and broadcaster (d. 1980)
- 12 June – Peter Jones, British comic actor (d. 2000)
- 18 June – Ian Carmichael, British actor (d. 2010)
- 28 June – Irene Thomas, British radio quiz show player (d. 2001)
- 15 October – Robert Rockwell, American actor (d. 2003)
- 12 October – Steve Conway, British singer (d. 1952)

== See also ==
- List of oldest radio stations
- List of initial AM-band station grants in the United States
