= 1914 in radio =

The year 1914 in radio involved some significant events.

== Events ==
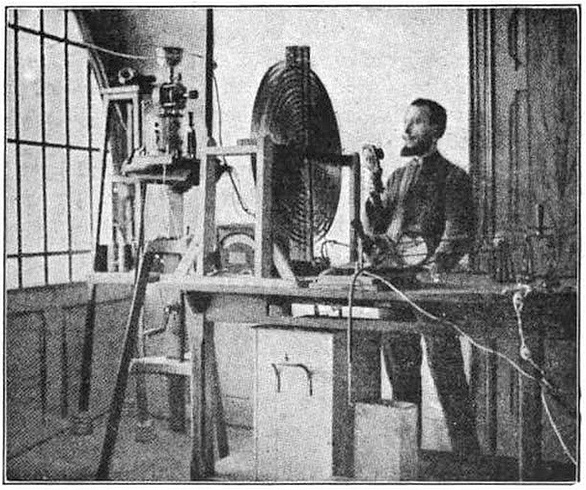
Robert Goldschmidt with Laeken, Belgium radiotelephone equipment.

- 28 March – Robert Goldschmidt inaugurates weekly radiotelephone broadcasts from Laeken, Belgium, using a Moretti high-frequency spark transmitter and Marzi microphone. Broadcasts end after the German invasion at the start of World War I.
- 6 October – Edwin Howard Armstrong is granted a United States patent for the regenerative circuit.

== Births ==
- 20 January – Roy Plomley, English radio broadcaster (died 1985)
- 26 January – Jack de Manio, English radio broadcaster (died 1988)
- 25 February – John Arlott, English cricket commentator (died 1991)
- 29 April – Deryck Guyler, English actor (died 1999)
- 12 May – Howard K. Smith, American journalist and radio reporter (died 2002)
- 19 July – Hubert Gregg, English actor, songwriter and broadcaster (died 2004)
- 22 July – Charles Régnier, German actor (died 2001)
- 2 October – Yuri Levitan, Russian radio announcer (died 1983)
- 27 October – Dylan Thomas, Welsh poet and radio broadcaster (died 1953)
- 29 October – Ben Gage, American actor, singer and radio announcer (died 1978)
- 25 December – Abelardo Raidi, Venezuelan sportswriter and radio broadcaster (died 2002)
- 29 December – Margaret Hubble, English radio presenter (died 2006)
