= Detroit News Orchestra =

World's first radio orchestra

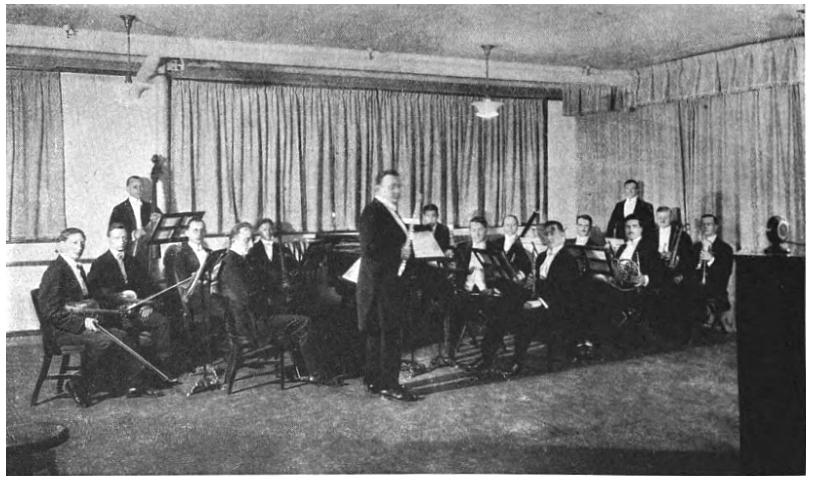
Detroit News Orchestra in WWJ radio studio

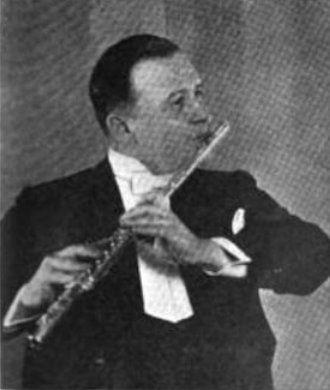
Otto Krueger, the conductor, playing a flute

The Detroit News Orchestra was the world's first radio orchestra, debuting in 1922. It was composed of already-distinguished members of the Detroit Symphony Orchestra, broadcasting from radio station WWJ in Detroit, Michigan. The orchestra's broadcasts could be received halfway across North America and even as far away as Hawaii.

== Background ==
The 16 members of the Detroit News Orchestra were drawn from the city's Detroit Symphony Orchestra, all of whom had previously achieved distinction as accomplished soloists. The orchestra broadcast on WWJ radio station, debuting on May 28, 1922. The broadcasts were sponsored by The Detroit Bank and could be received across half of North America.

The orchestra, sometimes referred to as the "little symphony" by WWJ Detroit News radio station, performed at their studio Monday through Friday at 7:00 p.m., as well as at 2:00 p.m. on Sundays.

== Listeners in Hawaii ==
On November 23, 1922, at thirty minutes past midnight, the Detroit News Orchestra played the waltz "Three O'Clock in the Morning" in studio in the Detroit News building. The transmission was received clearly at 6:30 p.m. local time in the Hawaiian Islands by A. F. Costa, the postmaster there. Several people listened to the program in its entirety at the Wailuku post office, that was more than 4,400 miles (7,100 km) from Detroit. The notes of the music transmitted from the Detroit News radio station in Michigan took about one fiftieth of a second to arrive in Hawaii.

== Ensemble ==
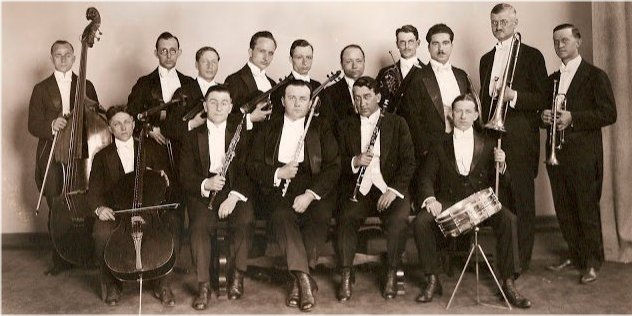
Detroit News Orchestra players

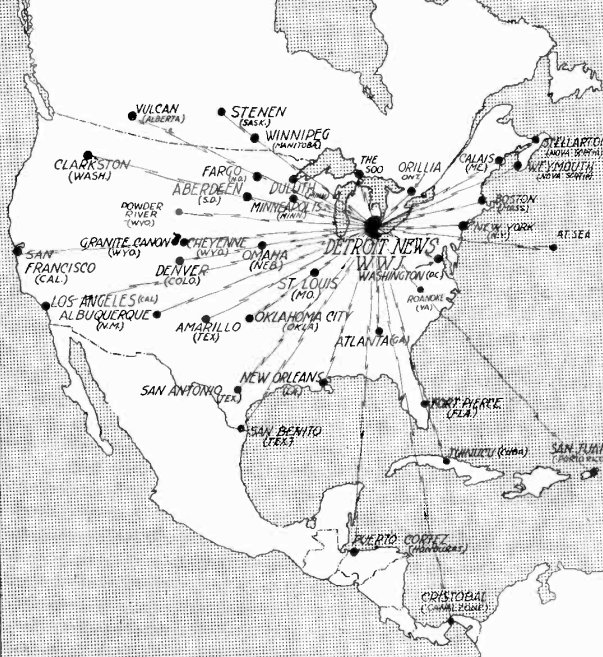
WWJ broadcast range

List of personnel of the musical ensemble.

- Otto E. Krueger – conductor
- Maurice Warner – violinist
- Herman Goldstein – violinist
- LeRoy Hancock – violinist
- Armand Hebert – violinist
- Valbert P. Coffey – pianist
- Frederick Broeder – cellist
- Eugene W Braunsdorf – bass violin soloist
- Thomas J Byrne – oboe soloist
- R. M. Arey – clarinetist
- Vincenzo Pezzi – bassoonist
- Albert Stagliamo – horn player
- Edward Clarke – trumpeter
- Floyd O'Hara – trumpeter
- Max Smith – trombonist
- Arthur Cooper – xylophone player

== See also ==
- 1922 in radio
