= Greg McNeilly =

Greg McNeilly is a Republican political strategist in the United States, and the President of the Michigan Freedom Fund.

McNeilly was a regular host of WWJ (AM) talk-radio's Eye on Michigan Politics.

In 2012, McNeilly led the efforts of the Michigan ballot committee Protecting Michigan Taxpayers which successfully defeated the union initiated proposal 57-42%.

In 2010, McNeilly was the General Consultant for the Michigan Republican Party to then Chairman Ronald Weiser.

McNeilly was one of AOL-Time Warner's Political Machine bloggers during the 2008 Presidential campaign. Political Machine has since become Politics Daily.

In 2006, McNeilly served as campaign manager for Michigan gubernatorial candidate Dick DeVos. While unsuccessful at the ballot box, National Journal cited the DeVos campaign as the best run Republican challenger campaign of 2006. That cycle, no Republican challenger won election from the state house level to U.S. Senate; and only in Wisconsin did a Republican win an open seat for Attorney General.

In 2005, he served as Recruiting & Strategy Director for the National Republican Senatorial Committee under the leadership of then U.S. Senator Elizabeth Dole (R-NC).

During the reelection campaign of President George W. Bush (R), McNeilly served as Executive Director of the Michigan Republican Party, then under the chairmanship of Betsy DeVos.

In 2002, McNeilly served as communications consultant to Don Carcieri’s winning gubernatorial campaign against Myrth York in Rhode Island.

In 2000, he served as Communications Director for the Michigan statewide ballot proposal “Kid’s First Yes!” which sought to take money from public schools, to fund children in private schools. In 2001, he was the Executive Director of Choices for Children a Michigan-based education reform advocacy group supporting greater taxpayer accountability in state-run k12 schools. He currently serves on the board of directors of the Great Lakes Education Project.

McNeilly, according to the St. Johns Reminder, got involved in politics early in life at age 8; volunteering for State Representative candidate, a neighbor, Alan Cropsey.

McNeilly graduated from Michigan State University with a B.S. in Social Studies, Politics and Economics. During his undergraduate tenure he won placement in an essay contest for doctoral students in the Mont Pelerin Society’s Fredrick Hayek Essay Contest.

== Career ==
McNeilly managed his first campaign, an unsuccessful congressional effort by West Point graduate and retired U.S. Army Colonel, John Pappageorge in 1992. Congressman Sander Levin (D-MI) won by 7%.

In 1994, in a re-match the same outcome was experienced. This race saw Pappageorge outnumbered by a 3-to-1 ratio and in the end Pappageorge narrowed the loss to a 2.5% swing of the vote. The 1994 race earned national attention when then Congressman Newt Gingrich called the core of volunteers that helped the campaign “the Pappageorge Army…the best application of grassroots volunteers in America.”

Beating out three others, McNeilly was elected to the state GOP's post of Youth Vice Chairman from 1993 to 1994. He was first employed at the central Republican Party's office in 1988, while still in high school, by then Chairman E. Spencer Abraham.

Later, in 1997, he returned to serve as the Communication's Director for the Michigan Republican Party and then in 1998–2000 as its Political Director. In 1998, Michigan Republicans had the most successful political year capturing all statewide offices, except Attorney General, including the state Supreme Court.

In 2003, he returned to the Michigan Republican Party to serve as Executive Director under Chairman Betsy DeVos. The duo inherited an organization $1.2 million in debt, the debt was overcome and the party was a key player in the 2004 electoral map.

In 2009, McNeilly served as a consultant to Michigan Republican Party Chairman Ron Weiser.

McNeilly, a product of both public and private schools, has been a key player in Michigan education reform battles. In 2000, he was Communication's Director for the Kids First Yes! ballot proposal that would have legalized k12 school vouchers and merit pay for teachers. In 2001, he was the Executive Director of a start-up school reform advocacy organization, Choices for Children. Since 2007, he has been a member of the board of directors of the Great Lakes Education Project (GLEP) under its Chairman E. James Barrett.

In late 2009, McNeilly announced he would be serving as Vice President of Administration for the Windquest Group, a company led by Betsy and Dick DeVos. In 2012, McNeilly became the Windquest Group's Chief Operating Officer.

== Controversy ==
During the 2004 election cycle, McNeilly admitted to leading the charge to put independent Presidential candidate Ralph Nader on the ballot. McNeilly defended the move by claiming it was simply a matter of providing choice to the voters. Local Democrats filed legal action against him but ultimately failed and he was cleared of any wrongdoing.

Later in the same election, McNeilly accused filmmaker Michael Moore of breaking Michigan election law by bribing college students to vote. Moore was offering noodles and clean underwear during Democrat get-out-the-vote drives.

The state capitol's insider publication MIRS, wrote in a 2006 piece about McNeilly, he has “few undecideds. You know whether you like him or not.”

In a failed attempt to repeal the state's campaign contributions, McNeilly sued the State of Michigan (McNeilly v Land) but was rebuffed by the U.S. 6th Circuit Court of Appeals.

== Issues ==
In addition to being one of the top architects of Michigan's Right-to-work law, McNeilly has been an advocate of repealing the states mandatory prevailing wage. McNeilly has also gone on record favoring elimination of the compulsory State Bar of Michigan dues requirement for lawyers, government teacher certification requirements, for greater choice in electric utility options., in support of gun-rights, and for greater transparency in Michigan's state government.

== Personal ==
On 22 March 2014, he married Douglas Meeks, a Lansing attorney.
