= WWJ (AM) =

Radio station in Detroit, Michigan

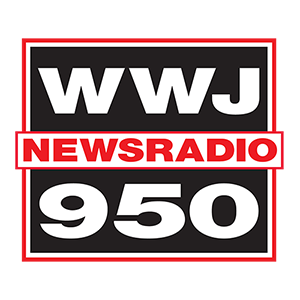
- Detroit, Michigan; United States
- Broadcast area: Metro Detroit
- Frequency: 950 kHz
- Branding: Newsradio 950 WWJ

Programming
- Language: English
- Format: All-news radio
- Affiliations: ABC News Radio; Detroit Pistons; WWJ-TV

Ownership
- Owner: Audacy, Inc.; (Audacy License, LLC)
- Sister stations: WDZH; WOMC; WXYT; WXYT-FM; WYCD

History
- First air date: August 20, 1920
- Former call signs: 8MK (1920–1921); WBL (1921–1922)
- Call sign meaning: None. Assigned after requesting a call that could be easily understood. (Note: Although later speculation has suggested that the new call letters might have stood for stockholders William and John Scripps, page 82 of the Detroit News' 1922 station history, WWJ—The Detroit News, stated that "WWJ is not the initials of any name. It is a symbol." Also, the 1973 book The News of Detroit (page 83) stated: "The observant insider noted that the second two letters were the initials of Will's son. But the similarity in the governmentally issued call letters was just a happy coincidence.")

Technical information
- Licensing authority: FCC
- Facility ID: 9621
- Class: B
- Power: 50,000 watts
- Transmitter coordinates: 42°01′9″N 83°14′23″W
- Repeater: 97.1 WXYT-HD2 (Detroit)

Links
- Public license information: Public file; LMS
- Webcast: Listen live (via Audacy)
- Website: www.audacy.com/wwjnewsradio

WWJ (950 kHz) is a commercial AM radio station licensed to serve Detroit, Michigan, featuring an all-news radio format known as WWJ Newsradio 950. Owned by Audacy, Inc., the station services Metro Detroit, and is the flagship station for the Michigan Sports Network. Operating on a regional broadcast frequency, its studios are in the Panasonic Building in Southfield.

The station's transmitter site is near Newport. WWJ broadcasts full-time with 50,000 watts, using a five-tower directional antenna system during daytime hours, and its entire six-tower array at night. WWJ has the highest field strength – 7,980 mV/m at a distance of 1 km – in a single direction (nighttime pattern) of any U.S. AM station. With this powerful signal primarily sent to the north, the station can be heard in parts of northern Michigan during nighttime hours, including the Upper Peninsula and Mackinac areas, and much of southern Lower Michigan during the day.

WWJ is licensed by the Federal Communications Commission to broadcast in the HD Radio format, and is simulcast on the HD-2 sub-channel of sister station WXYT-FM.

On the air for over a century, WWJ began daily broadcasts as the "Detroit News Radiophone" on August 20, 1920, while it operated under an amateur radio license with the call sign "8MK". Over the years the station has claimed the titles of "America's Pioneer Broadcasting Station" and where "commercial radio broadcasting began."

== Programming ==
WWJ is Michigan's only all-news radio station and features "traffic and weather together" every 10 minutes "on the eights" around the clock. The exception is during live sporting events and infomercials, which it often (though not always) includes during its programming. In cases where there are schedule conflicts, it also carries sports events normally broadcast by its sister stations. (For example, WWJ airs Detroit Tigers baseball games when WXYT-FM is broadcasting Detroit Red Wings hockey.) In these cases the regular news programming can still be heard online.

In March 2005, WWJ began streaming its programming over the Internet. In August 2005, the station began offering podcasts of newsmakers, interviews, and some of the station's feature programming. In August 2006, it began broadcasting in the HD Radio format. WWJ programming was live 24 hours a day until July 2015, when, to cut costs, it began airing pre-recorded reports overnight. By 2016, the station returned to live news around the clock.

WWJ is the flagship station of the Michigan News Network, a network of over 50 affiliate radio stations across the state of Michigan that air news and sports reports produced by WWJ's news team.

On May 22 2026 and up until the closer of CBS News Radio, WWJ had historically held an affiliate status with CBS for national and international news coverage at which point WWJ followed its Audacy sister stations in switching to ABC News Radio.

=== Current on-air staff ===
- Chris Fillar (Weekday Mornings)
- Jackie Paige (Weekday Mornings to Mid-Days)
- Tracey McCaskill (Weekday Mid-Days to Afternoons)
- Tony Ortiz (Weekday Afternoons and Evenings)
- Kyle Kimball (Sunday-Thursday Evenings)
- Jay Dennis (Saturday Mornings)
- Luke Sloan (Saturday Afternoons)
- Chris Keyzer (Saturday and Sunday Evenings)
- Greg Bowman (Sunday Mornings)

== History ==
In her 1960 review of the station's history, Cynthia Boyes Young cautioned that: "The actual beginnings of the Detroit News radio station, later to be known as WWJ, were not recorded at the time, and the story can only be partially pieced together from the reminiscences of radio pioneers." Three years later, Robert Preston Rimes found that "... fragmentary, incomplete, and sometimes, inaccurate histories existed".

=== Preparations ===
WWJ has traditionally recognized August 20, 1920, as its founding date. This was the day that the Detroit News inaugurated daily broadcasts from a studio established in the newspaper's headquarters building, located at the corner of Lafayette and 2nd Avenues. These initial broadcasts, by what was then called the "Detroit News Radiophone", were sent under an amateur station license operating with the call sign "8MK". (Note: The leading "8" in the call sign indicated that the station was located in the eighth Radio Inspection district. The "MK" was randomly assigned, however the fact that M falls in the range from A to W signified that the station was operating under a standard Amateur station license.)

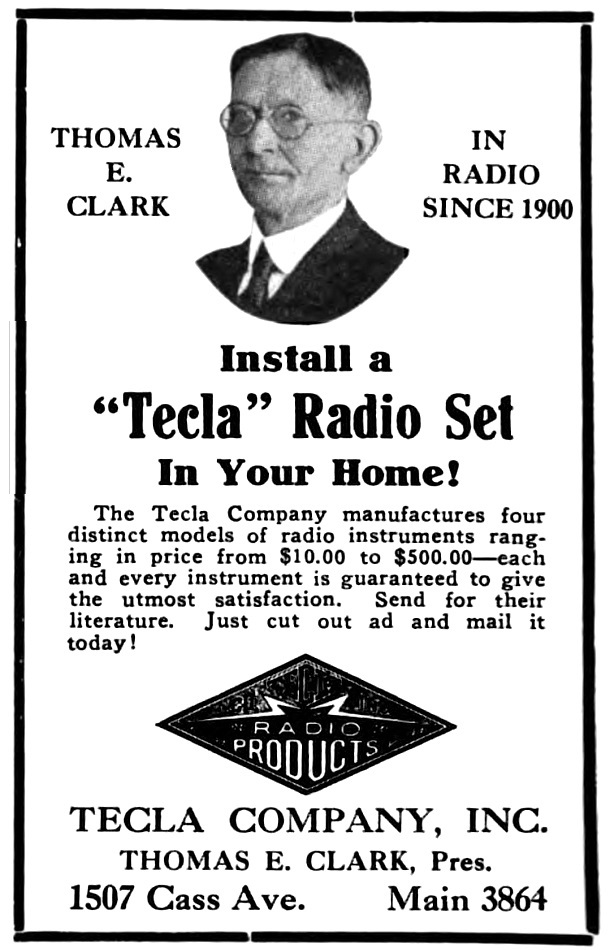
Radio pioneer Thomas E. Clark provided technical advice during the planning stages (1922 advertisement)

The person most responsible for establishing the Detroit News Radiophone service was the newspaper's vice-president and managing director, William E. Scripps. The Scripps family had a long history of interest in radio developments. In 1902, Thomas E. Clark founded the Thomas E. Clark Wireless Telephone-Telegraph Company, to supply vessels in the Great Lakes region with radio (then commonly known as "wireless") communication equipment. James E. Scripps, father of William E. Scripps and then-publisher of the Detroit News, took his son to witness a demonstration, and was also an early investor in Clark's company. On April 4, 1906, the News publicized the receipt of an order, via radiotelegraphy, by the advertising department from the Clark-equipped steamer City of Detroit. However, Clark was ultimately unable to compete with the predatory practices of the United Wireless Telegraph Company, and around 1910 ceased the Great Lakes installations. He subsequently opened an electrical shop in Detroit, and remained in contact with the Scripps family.

In April 1917, due to the entrance of the United States into World War One, it became illegal for private citizens to own radio receivers. This wartime ban was lifted effective April 15, 1919, and William E. Scripps' son, William J. Scripps, became interested in radio as a hobby, spending hours listening for distant stations. Most radio transmissions at this time were still being sent with the dots-and-dashes of Morse code. However, William E. Scripps later stated that it was his son's brief reception of an audio transmission that led to his initial investigation whether the News could set up its own broadcasting station. Drawing on advice from Thomas E. Clark, Scripps soon determined that the idea was in fact practical, primarily due to recent advances in radio transmitter technology, especially the development of vacuum-tube transmitters.

Sometime during 1919, Scripps and Clark prepared an expansive proposal that was brought before the newspaper's board of directors, requesting financing for the building of a powerful radio station capable of providing service throughout the Great Lakes region. Although initially resistant, the board eventually approved the request. However, significant modifications had to be made to the original plan. The proposal specified a 3,000 watt transmitter that would be constructed locally by Clark's Tecla Company, based on the design of General Electric's CG 4000 transmitter. (Note: Thomas E. Clark had been employed by G.E. in the 1890s.) Clark was subsequently sent by Scripps to General Electric's headquarters at Schenectady, New York, to make further arrangements, but he was unsuccessful in reaching an agreement. After this Clark largely withdrew from participation, to the degree that his first visit to the station did not take place until 1937.

At this point, a new group of individuals became involved. Beginning in 1907, inventor Lee de Forest had been the leading proponent in the United States trying to introduce organized radio broadcasting, especially by newspapers. However, due to technical and financial issues, he had made little progress in making converts to the idea. In late 1916, the DeForest Radio Telephone & Telegraph Company began broadcasting a nightly "wireless newspaper" entertainment and news program from its experimental station, 2XG, located in the Highbridge section of New York City. This station had to suspend operations during World War One, but was revived shortly after the October 1, 1919, lifting of the wartime ban on civilian stations.

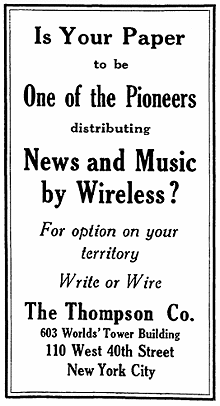
March 25, 1920, advertisement for Radio News & Music, Inc.

In early 1920, Clarence "C. S." Thompson, a New York City associate of Lee de Forest, and John F. Hubbard (Note: One of the investors listed for the 1902 founding of the Thomas E. Clark Wireless Telephone-Telegraph Company was "John Hubbard", however it is not clear whether this John Hubbard was related to the John F. Hubbard of Radio News & Music.) formed Radio News & Music, Inc., which in March 1920 took up the promotion of newspaper-run broadcasting stations, offering local franchises and asking in national advertisements "Is Your Paper to be One of the Pioneers Distributing News and Music by Wireless?" The Detroit News would become Radio News & Music's first – and ultimately only – newspaper customer. (Note: C. S. Thompson later reported that additional newspapers had expressed interest, including the Kansas City Star, Pittsburgh Sun, Louisville Courier-Journal, and The Baltimore Sun, but insufficient company financing meant Radio News & Music was unable to continue operating.)

In a letter dated May 28, 1920, the News made arrangements to lease a DeForest OT-10 radio transmitter through Radio News & Music, to develop a broadcasting service. An initial equipment shipment was made the same day, and Radio News & Music hired a local teenaged amateur radio operator, Michael DeLisle Lyons, to install the transmitter in a second floor room of the News headquarters building, connected to an antenna constructed on the roof. (Note: Later that year, Michael and his brother Frank, also assembled the first radio in a police car in Toledo, Ohio (with Ed Clark who started WJR, 760 AM, in Detroit). They captured a prowler using the radio, making national headlines. RCA got the contract to install radios in police cars across the country.) The May 28 shipment never arrived, so a replacement was sent from New York on July 15. After Lyons did some initial installation work a financial dispute broke out between him and the newspaper's management, so the News hired Frank Edwards to take over engineering responsibilities. Elton M. Plant, an aspiring reporter who had a good speaking and singing voice, was drafted as an announcer.

De Forest had sold the commercial rights to his radio patents to the American Telephone & Telegraph Company (AT&T) in 1917. However, he retained the right to sell equipment for "amateur and experimental use", so the station operated under a standard amateur radio license, with the call sign 8MK. William E. Scripps was very enthusiastic about the project, and kept close track as the equipment was being tested. However, the work was done with very limited publicity, and there are reports that some at the newspaper worried that a radio station might adversely affect paper sales, thus measures were taken to hide the direct involvement of the Scripps family, including originally licensing 8MK in Michael DeLisle Lyons' name. (Note: There is varying information about the holder of the 8MK license. In the April 4, 1920 issue of the Pittsburgh Gazette-Times, C. E. Urban's "The Radio Amateur" column lists 8MK as newly assigned to Howard Bowman, 171 Kenilworth Avenue in Detroit. (Bowman appears to have been a Detroit News employee—the November 3, 1917 issue of The Fourth Estate has a reference to "Howard Bowman of the Detroit News" and an article in the February 26, 1919, issue of the newspaper, "Four Die in D. U. R. Crash", credits him as a "staff correspondent".) The "Local Calls" list in the August 17, 1920 issue of the Detroit Radio News also lists Howard Bowman for 8MK, but the next issue, dated October 30, 1920, lists 8MK as "Detroit News (Fone), Cor. Second and Lafayette Ave., Detroit, Mich." In the June 30, 1921 edition Archived June 22, 2023, at the Wayback Machine of the Department of Commerce's annual Amateur Radio Stations of the United States the owner is "Radio News and Music (Inc.), Detroit, Michigan", while the May 1922 Consolidated Radio Call Book lists 8MK's owner as "Radio News and Music, Inc. (M. D. Lyons), Lafayette and 2nd Ave." In a 1973 letter, Michael Lyons wrote that the license had been initially issued under his name.)

Scripps' original proposal had envisioned operating on an uncongested frequency somewhere within the 600 to 1600 meter (500 to 187.5 kHz) band normally reserved for government stations. However, as an amateur station 8MK was required to transmit on the standard – thus interference-prone – amateur wavelength of 200 meters (1500 kHz), although contemporary newspaper accounts stated that it sometimes operated on other, less congested, wavelengths. (Note: The Detroit News reported on January 2, 1921, that its station was transmitting on 325 meters with plans to move to 200 meters "soon", on February 6, 1921, it reported 300 meters, on April 17, 1921, "about 260 meters" and on May 8, 1921, "exactly 200 meters".) In addition, the OT-10 transmitter was only rated for 20 watts, far less than the 3,000 watts contemplated in Scripps' original proposal.

=== Debut ===
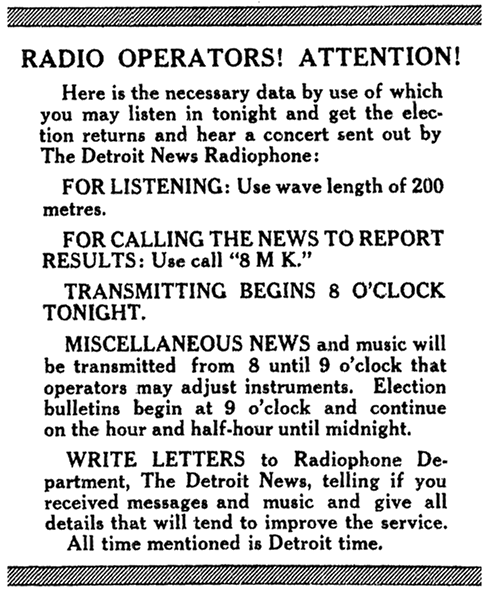
Front page announcement in the August 31, 1920 Detroit News introducing the "Detroit News Radiophone"

8MK began nightly trial broadcasts on August 20, 1920, to check if the equipment was ready for regular service. However, because the station was still unpublicized the original audience consisted only of a small number of interested local amateur radio enthusiasts. The test programs proved satisfactory, so, on August 31, 1920, the Detroit News announced on its front page that, starting that evening, nightly (except Sunday) broadcasts would be transmitted by the "Detroit News Radiophone" service. That evening's debut program featured regularly updated returns for a primary election held that day, plus vocal performances by Lois Johnson. Malcolm Bingay, managing director of the Detroit News, was the broadcast's master of ceremonies.

The front page of the next day's News contained enthusiastic reports attesting to the success of the election night broadcast, which had begun "promptly at 8:10 p. m.", with the newspaper declaring: "The sending of the election returns by The Detroit News Radiophone Tuesday night was fraught with romance and must go down in the history of man's conquest of the elements as a gigantic step in his progress." The paper also reported receiving "numberless telephone calls to The News office asking for details of the apparatus".

Daily broadcasts, most commonly between 7 and 8 pm, continued through September. Although the initial programs consisted mostly of phonograph records interspersed with news announcements, programming also included fight results from the heavyweight championship bout between Jack Dempsey and Billy Miske on September 6, and, in October, play-by-play accounts as the Cleveland Indians bested the Brooklyn Dodgers in the 1920 World Series baseball championship. Weekly vocal concerts were begun on September 23, with Mabel Norton Ayers as the first featured artist. By late October, the paper was boasting that "hundreds of Detroiters are now the possessors of wireless receiving sets by which they get the news bulletins, music and other features sent out by The News Radiophone", as the station prepared to broadcast returns for that year's presidential election on November 2.

=== Early years ===
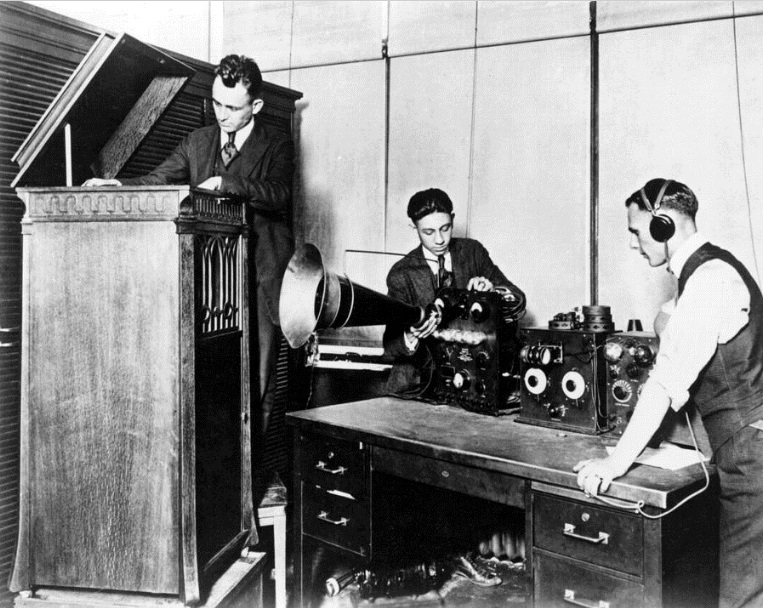
August 1920 publicity photograph. L-R: Howard J. Trumbo, manager of the local Thomas A. Edison Record Shop, operating a phonograph player; Elton M. Plant, Detroit News employee and announcer, behind 8MK's DeForest OT-10 radio transmitter; and engineer Frank Edwards.

The station's costs were borne by the newspaper—there was no advertising until the mid-1920s—and by 1922 the station staff had increased to ten. Performers were not paid, however, the station was able to attract numerous "illustrious persons" to appear over the airwaves from the station's "phonitorium" studio, including Lillian Gish, Fanny Brice, Ty Cobb, and Babe Ruth. The station is believed to be the first to broadcast news reports regularly, and the first to present regularly scheduled religious broadcasts and play-by-play sports reports.

In the fall of 1921, the News purchased the DeForest OT-10 transmitter it had been leasing from Radio News & Music, and applied for a "Special Amateur" station license, which would provide better coverage by allowing the station to move to a wavelength less subject to interference. (Note: The government agency responsible for radio regulation at the time was the United States Department of Commerce's Bureau of Navigation.) However, on October 13, 1921, the government instead issued the News a "Limited Commercial" license, and early the next month the newspaper announced: "The Detroit News radio station is now operating under a limited commercial license with call letters WBL. The wavelength used is 360 meters [833 kHz] and a special antenna has been erected to use this wave. The station will transmit as before beginning every evening, except Sunday." While this had the desired benefit of now being on a less congested wavelength, it also meant the station's continued use of DeForest equipment was technically in violation of the commercial radio equipment patent rights held by AT&T. This potential problem was soon resolved by the purchase of a 500-watt transmitter from AT&T subsidiary Western Electric, which was installed on January 28, 1922.

The new WBL call sign was randomly assigned, and the News found that listeners had trouble hearing it correctly, so the newspaper asked the regional Radio Inspector, S. W. Edwards, to have it changed to something more phonetically distinct, requesting WKL or WWW. Neither of these call signs was available, so one similar to the paper's request, WWJ, was assigned on March 3, 1922.

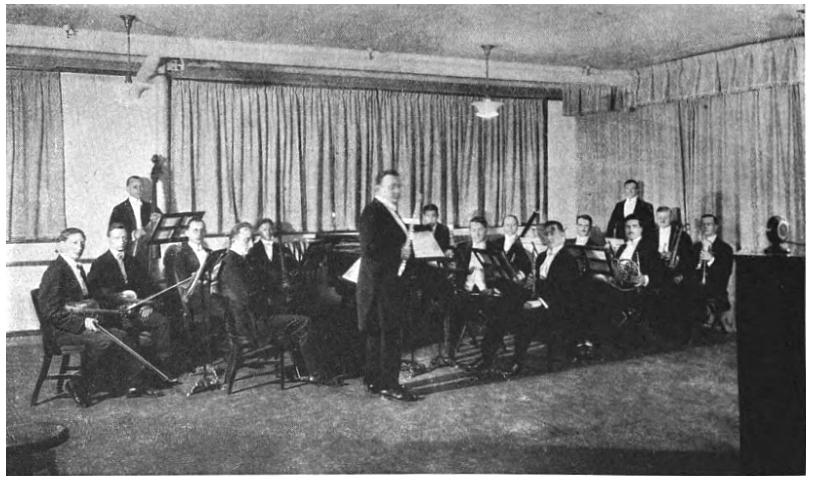
1922 Detroit News Orchestra broadcast. The large round unit atop the stand on the far right foreground is the pick-up microphone.

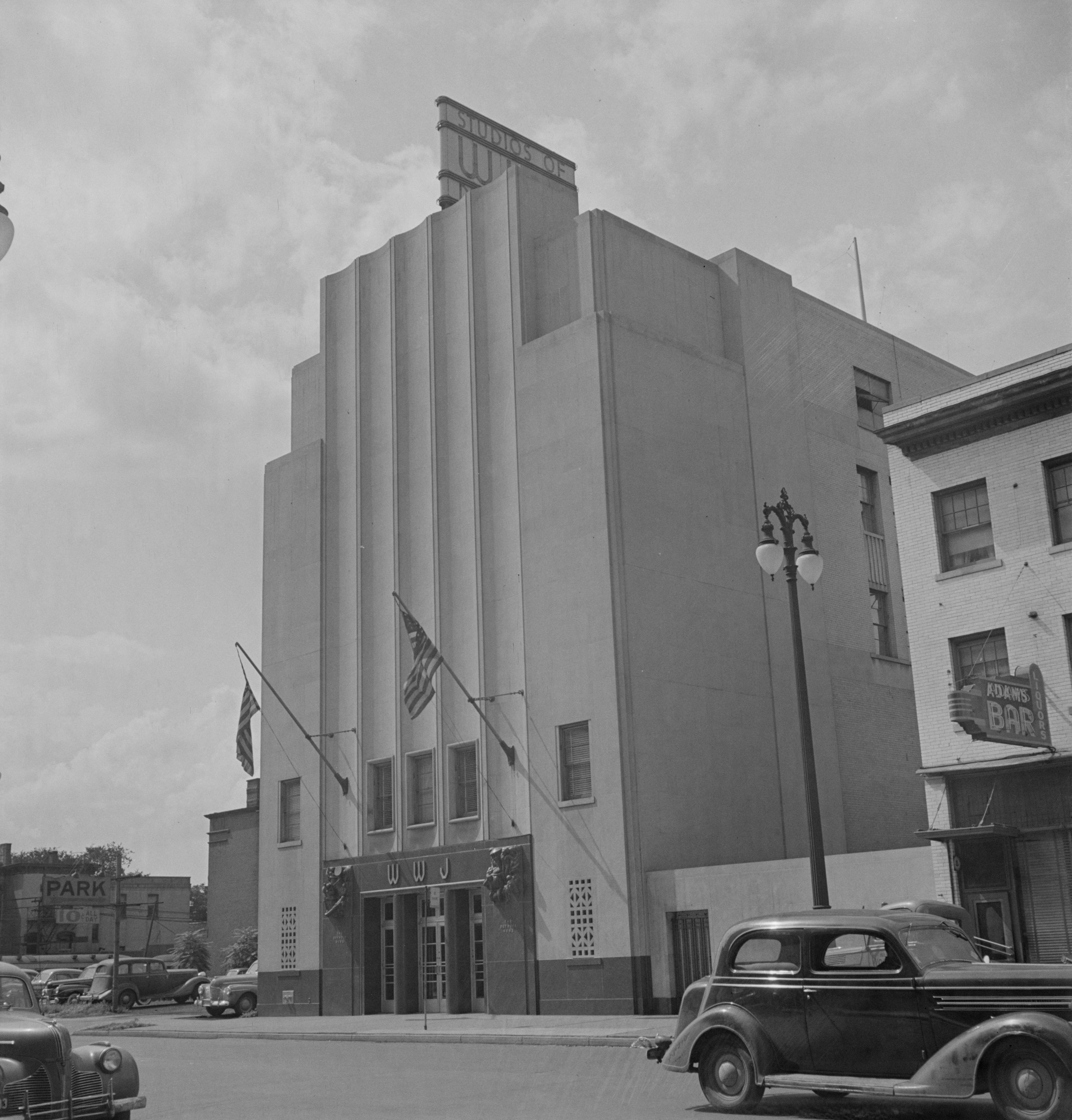
Station building built in 1936, photo taken around 1942 by Arthur Siegel

Effective December 1, 1921, the U.S. government for the first time adopted regulations formally defining "broadcasting stations". The wavelength of 360 meters (for which WBL and eight other stations already held licenses) was designated for entertainment broadcasts, while 485 meters (619 kHz) was reserved for broadcasting official weather and other government reports. On March 3, 1922, WWJ was granted permission to transmit on 485 meters, in addition to its original 360-meter assignment. 1922 saw a rapid expansion in the number of broadcasting stations, most sharing the single entertainment wavelength of 360 meters, which required progressively more complicated time sharing schedules among stations in the same region. That May the News bristled at having to suffer the "handicap" of being required to give up some airtime to its competitor, the Detroit Free Press, which had, in the words of the News, decided to "break in" by establishing its own station, WCX (now WJR). A front page "explanation" in the News complained about having to reduce its schedule of "unique, wholesome and delightful entertainment".

In late September 1922 a second entertainment wavelength, 400 meters (750 kHz), was made available for "Class B" stations, which had higher powers and better quality equipment and programming. Both WWJ and WCX qualified to use this new wavelength, on a timesharing basis. In early 1923 the United States further expanded the broadcast station allocations into a continuous band from 550 to 1350 kHz, with stations now using a single frequency, no longer having to broadcast entertainment and official reports on separate frequencies. Under the new allocations the Class B frequency of 580 kHz (516.9 meters) was designated for use by qualified stations in the "Detroit/Dearborn" area, (Note: Beginning with these assignments radio stations ended the practice of broadcasting their market reports and weather forecasts on the separate 485-meter wavelength.) and both WWJ and WCX were assigned to this frequency. In January 1925 WWJ was reassigned to an exclusive Class B frequency, 850 kHz (352.7 meters). A series of reassignments followed, as the government struggled to structure the broadcast band to accommodate an increasingly congested environment. On November 11, 1928, the Federal Radio Commission implemented a major AM band reorganization, under the provisions of its General Order 40. This reallocation divided stations into three classes, which became known as "Clear", "Regional" and "Local". WWJ was tentatively assigned to a clear channel frequency of 820 kHz, which would have permitted operation with up to 50,000 watts. However, the station's management was unprepared to bear the cost of a major transmitter upgrade, and instead settled for assignment to one of the regional frequencies, 920 kHz (325.9 meters), with a transmitter power of 1,000 watts, the maximum permitted at the time for regional frequencies.

=== 1930s and 1940s ===
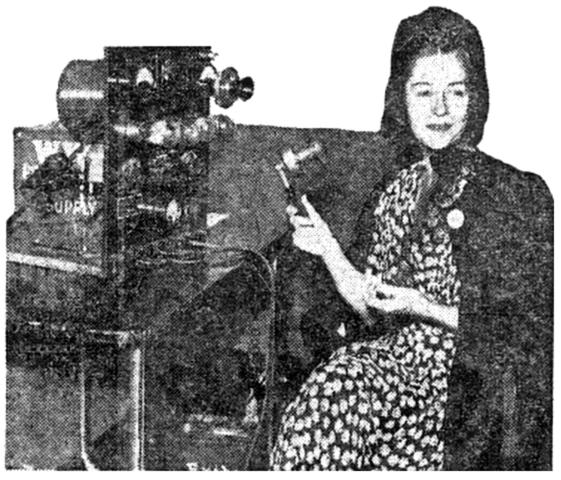
1941 publicity photograph of actress Dorothy Gish re-creating an early broadcast using the original DeForest OT-10 transmitter.

In 1937 WWJ became one of the first stations to increase its power to the new maximum of 5,000 watts for regional frequencies. On March 29, 1941, as part of the North American Regional Broadcasting Agreement (NARBA) frequency reassignments, the station moved to 950 kHz, where it remains to this day. The programming throughout this time was focused on variety. During the 1940s, WWJ transmitted most of the NBC Red Network schedule, along with locally produced news, entertainment and music programming. After World War II, especially as television grew in household reach and popularity, music and regularly scheduled local news would make up a larger portion of its format as television eroded support for variety programming on radio and the Golden Age of Radio gradually ended.

The Federal Communications Commission (FCC) was interested in increasing the number of broadcasting outlets, and began licensing "Apex" stations, operating on higher transmitting frequencies than the original AM band. On January 29, 1936, the Detroit News activated its own Apex station, W8XWJ, initially broadcasting at 31.6 MHz and relaying WWJ's programs. As with WWJ, W8XWJ used amplitude modulation (AM), but it was also engineered to transmit in high-fidelity. The FCC ultimately decided that the second broadcast band would use frequency modulation (FM), so W8XWJ ceased operating in early 1940, as the News prepared to replace it with an FM station. On May 10, 1941, that new station, W45D, debuted as Michigan's first FM station, which would later undergo five call letter changes – to WENA, WWJ-FM, WJOI, WYST and WKRK – before becoming WXYT-FM. WWJ also got into the nascent medium of television when WWDT began service on October 23, 1946, for one day of demonstrative programming; regular programming commenced on March 4, 1947, with the call letters changing to match the radio station, WWJ-TV two months later on May 15, and has been affiliated with the NBC television network since its sign-on, owing to WWJ radio's longtime association with the NBC Radio Network. The station changed its call letters to WDIV-TV in 1978 when it split from the WWJ radio stations upon its purchase by The Washington Post Company, and was Michigan's first television station.

=== Adoption of news and talk format ===
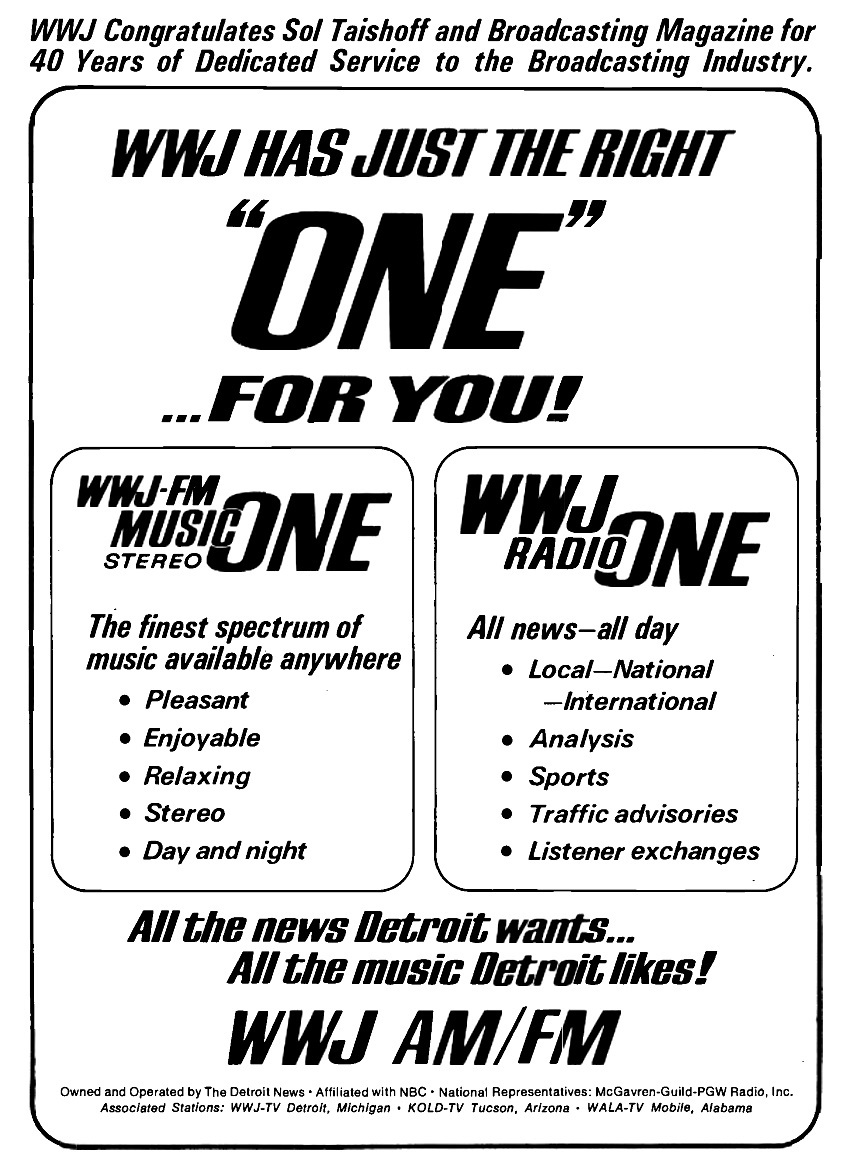
In 1971 WWJ (AM) adopted an All News format

With the increasing popularity of FM radio and stereo broadcasting, 950 WWJ phased out its daytime middle of the road music programming in May 1971 and became a strictly news and talk station during the daytime hours (although for the first several years of the all-news format, the station simulcast the beautiful music format of WWJ-FM 97.1, during the overnight hours). The all-news format on WWJ has remained since then, enabling it to rank consistently among the Detroit area's most popular stations with adult listeners, occasionally finishing in first place in recent surveys.

In 1987, the Federal Broadcasting Corporation, run by David Herriman, purchased WWJ and its FM counterpart, WJOI, from the new owner of The Detroit News, the Gannett Company which was required to sell the stations immediately by the Federal Communications Commission because of cross-ownership rules in effect at that time. On March 9, 1989, CBS bought the stations, with its ownership being transferred to Infinity Broadcasting after CBS's 1996 acquisition of that group. (Infinity later returned to using the CBS Radio name.) From 1995 until 2017, it again had a television sister station when CBS purchased WGPR-TV (channel 62) in the wake of an NFL-related affiliation switch where CBS lost WJBK-TV as its affiliate, and channel 62's calls were changed to WWJ-TV on September 20, 1995, to trade off the goodwill of WWJ radio.

Along with "97.1 The Ticket", WWJ was the flagship station for Detroit Pistons basketball from 2009 to 2014. In 2013, all CBS-owned radio stations in Detroit moved their operations to the former Panasonic Building in Southfield.

On February 2, 2017, CBS Radio announced it would merge with Entercom. The merger was approved on November 9, 2017, and was consummated on November 17. The company became Audacy, Inc. in 2021.

=== WWJ (AM) transmitter relocation and signal upgrade ===
When CBS acquired WGPR-TV in 1995 and changed it calls to WWJ-TV, it needed a site for a new transmission tower to improve the UHF TV station's coverage, and the WWJ radio transmitter site in Oak Park was partially dismantled (the taller north tower was razed) to make room for the television tower. The AM transmitter facility was subsequently relocated in late 1998, to a new six-tower array located in Monroe County, near Newport. The new site allowed WWJ to upgrade from 5,000 to 50,000 watts, greatly improving its nighttime signal in the Downriver communities, where it previously had a weak signal, due to the use of a directional antenna that protected the coverage areas of other stations on 950 kHz, including WSFS in Chicago, KKSE in Denver, KPRC in Houston, and WKDN in Philadelphia. The move was not without its disadvantages, as the new site's distance from commercially important Oakland County meant the signal, though adequate for home and outdoor listening, was difficult to receive inside office buildings. Even though WWJ was now using the maximum power permitted to AM stations in the United States, it was still considered to be a Regional station, because 950 AM is classified as a regional frequency in the U.S., on which only Class B stations and Class D stations may be assigned. (Note: Outside of North America, Class A stations may also be assigned in the countries which observe the 10 kHz frequency rules.)

== Notable former on-air staff ==
- Mark Champion
- Hugh Downs
- Sonny Eliot
- Paul Keels
- Bill Kennedy
- Byron MacGregor
- Fred Manfra

== Pioneer station status ==
Although WWJ is widely recognized as a pioneer broadcasting station, its exact status compared to other early U.S. stations, especially KDKA in Pittsburgh, also currently owned by Audacy, has been a source of contention. (KDKA began operating on November 2, 1920, initially under a temporary "Special Amateur" authorization as "8ZZ"). The disagreement over WWJ and KDKA has been long-standing, and controversial enough that some have gone out of their way to avoid becoming involved. This was on public display after the September 3, 1945, issue of Time magazine included a short note that the National Association of Broadcasters (NAB) had recently endorsed WWJ's "claim to being the world's first commercial radio station," by concluding that KDKA "was ten and a half weeks younger." This assertion brought a quick denial from NAB President J. Harold Ryan, who sent a letter to the magazine stating that Time had misconstrued informational material sent out by the association, and: "It was not the intention, nor is it the prerogative of the NAB to attempt to decide the relative claims of two pioneer broadcasting stations." (Note: The material involved was chronological information that had originally appeared in the 1942 edition of the Broadcasting Yearbook. Time magazine does not appear to have printed Ryan's letter or to have addressed his complaint in a later issue. In October Westinghouse withdrew its five stations from NAB membership, which Billboard magazine suggested was largely due to Westinghouse's dissatisfaction with how the NAB had handled KDKA's 25th anniversary.)

For its 25th anniversary on August 20, 1945, WWJ claimed the titles of "World's First Station" and where "commercial radio broadcasting began".

One complicating factor is that the U.S. government initially did not have a formal definition of "broadcasting" or any specific regulations. In particular, there were no restrictions about broadcasting stations operating under amateur or experimental licenses. It was only effective December 1, 1921, that formal standards for broadcasting stations were adopted, which essentially grafted a broadcasting service definition onto the existing Limited Commercial license category, as an authorization issued to a select number of designated stations. (A license class dating back to 1912, not all Limited Commercial stations were authorized to make broadcasts. A specific "broadcasting station" license would not exist until one was established by the Federal Radio Commission in 1927.)

This has led to varying interpretations about which stations should be considered the "first" and the "oldest surviving" broadcasters. In addition, numerous qualifiers have been proposed, leading to competing views about the relative importance of factors such as "regular," "continuous," "scheduled", "publicized," "commercial," and "real" — all in a challenging effort to develop a consensus about fast-moving events that were not always well documented. An example of the existence of competing standards occurred in 1923, when the Department of Commerce stated that "The first broadcasting license was issued in September, 1921", a reference to the September 15, 1921, Limited Commercial license issued to WBZ in Springfield, Massachusetts, which appears to be the first to have stated that the station would be used exclusively for broadcasting, while transmitting on 360 meters, which would become the standard "entertainment" wavelength designated by the December 1, 1921, regulations. However, this particular interpretation has not been widely adopted.

In 1977, the Journal of Broadcasting published a study, "Broadcasting's Oldest Stations: An Examination of Four Claimants," authored by Joseph E. Baudino and John M. Kittross, which reviewed four early U.S. stations — KDKA, WWJ, WHA in Madison, Wisconsin and KCBS in San Francisco — contending for the title of the "oldest [surviving] station in the nation." The authors ultimately favored KDKA, although unmentioned by the review was that lead author Baudino had formerly been that station's manager.

Based on the somewhat limited information available at the time, the authors eliminated WWJ on the grounds that "the evidence of a direct relationship between the licensee of 8MK and the licensee of WBL is very tenuous", and because supporting WWJ as the oldest U.S. station could only be done through "tortured reasoning." They also concluded that the Detroit News had not been significantly involved with radio broadcasting prior to the issuance of WBL's first license on October 13, 1921.

Baudino and Kittross' contention that there was only a "tenuous" relationship between 8MK and WBL/WWJ was the opposite of what WWJ staff had been saying for over half a century. During the years that the Detroit News operated WWJ, the newspaper's reviews had always stated that 8MK and WBL/WWJ were effectively the same station, which, although there had been call sign and license changes, had a continuous history as the "Detroit News Radiophone" dating to August 20, 1920. After leasing 8MK's DeForest OT-10 transmitter through Radio News & Music, the newspaper had assumed total responsibility for constructing and running the radio station, including hiring engineers and staff. The transfer from operating under 8MK's license to that of WBL's had minimal effect. The same DeForest OT-10 transmitter was being used, operating from the same location, and under the control of the same Detroit News employees who had been responsible for the 8MK broadcasts. Moreover, at the time of the switchover from 8MK to WBL, the News had informed its readers that, although the call sign and operating frequency were changing, the paper's broadcast service would continue, and "The Detroit News radio station... will transmit as before."

Publicity issued by WWJ regularly listed August 1920 as its founding date, but varied greatly when describing the station's historical significance. In an early example, a 1922 advertisement for the Detroit News merely stated that the paper deserved recognition for having "installed the first transmitting set in use by any newspaper." (At this time there was at least one other broadcasting station with a strong claim to predate both 8MK/WWJ and 8ZZ/KDKA, KZY in Oakland, California, which was a re-licensing of an experimental station: 6XC in San Francisco, also known as the "California Theater Station." 6XC had begun a wide-ranging selection of daily broadcasts around April 1920, and in 1921, Lee de Forest wrote that this was the "first radio-telephone station devoted solely" to broadcasting to the public. However, KZY would be deleted in early 1923.)

Later reviews became more sweeping in their claims. In 1934, an advertisement for WWJ included the contention that it was "America's Pioneer Broadcasting Station." While celebrating its 25th anniversary in August 1945, WWJ further claimed to have been the station where "commercial radio broadcasting began." ("First commercial station" status was also claimed by KDKA, in spite of the fact that both WWJ and KDKA were initially commercial-free and did not start to accept advertising until the mid-1920s, so in this case "commercial" appears to only mean that the station was under the control of a commercial enterprise.)

Largely ignored by WWJ and KDKA was a third station that had been reviewed in the Baudino and Kittross article, KCBS in San Francisco, which contended it was significantly older than both WWJ and KDKA. KCBS traced its history to a pre-World War One station operated by Charles "Doc" Herrold in San Jose, California. The station made test audio transmissions in 1909, and began broadcasting weekly concerts in 1912. Herrold's San Jose broadcasts were suspended during World War One when the U.S. government prohibited the operation of civilian radio stations, and after the war ended he did not return to the airwaves until May 1921. His experimental station was re-licensed in December 1921 as KQW, which later moved to San Francisco and became KCBS in 1949. Baudino and Kittross argued that this post-World War One gap disqualified KCBS from "oldest station" consideration, something neither KQW nor KCBS has agreed with, as program schedules for KQW appearing in 1925 included the slogan "Pioneer Broadcasting Station of the World." In 2009, KCBS celebrated its 100th birthday with a yearlong series of events throughout the Bay Area, including the public dedication of a plaque commemorating the "Centennial Celebration of the World's First Broadcasting Station". At the same time, KCBS adopted the slogan "The World's First Broadcasting Station".

== See also ==
- Detroit News Orchestra
- Greg McNeilly
- Media in Detroit
- List of initial AM-band station grants in the United States
- List of three-letter broadcast call signs in the United States
