= 1952 in radio =

List of years in radio	(table)
- … 1942; 1943; 1944; 1945; 1946; 1947; 1948; 1949; 1950; 1951; 1952; 1953; 1954; 1955; 1956; 1957; 1958; 1959; 1960; 1961; 1962 …
- In television 1949 1950 1951 1952 1953 1954 1955 In music 1949 1950 1951 1952 1953 1954 1955 In film 1949 1950 1951 1952 1953 1954 1955
- Art; Archaeology; Architecture; Literature; Music; Philosophy; Science; +...

The year 1952 saw a number of significant happenings in radio broadcasting history.

== Events ==
- 17 February – An abridged version of Samuel Beckett's play Waiting for Godot is performed in the studio of the Club d'Essai de la Radio and broadcast on French radio, a year prior to its theatrical premiere.
- 4 March – The Courier, the first seagoing radio station, is dedicated by United States president Harry Truman.
- 21 March – The Moondog Coronation Ball is hosted by star deejay Alan Freed and WJW (AM) in Cleveland, Ohio (modern-day WKNR) at the Cleveland Arena. Among those scheduled to perform at the event were Paul Williams and the Hucklebuckers, The Dominoes, Varetta Dillard and Tiny Grimes, but only the Hucklebuckers are able to perform before the concert is shut down by officials. So many tickets were counterfeited that the 12,500 seat Arena now had 25,000 people in attendance, alarming Cleveland Police Capt. William Zimmerman, who stopped the show. A near riot ensues when close to 7,000 additional fans, unable to buy tickets, rush the gates and storm into the arena. Freed and WJW gain national attention and prestige, and the event is now universally recognized as the first rock 'n roll concert.
- 28 August – DXCC in Cagayan de Oro, Philippines officially signs on the air, and becomes the first radio station of what becomes known as Radio Mindanao Network.

== Debuts ==
- 6 January – Cafe Istanbul debuts on ABC.
- 17 January – Bright Star (1951–3) debuts on MBS and NBC in syndication by the Ziv Company.
- 3 March – Whispering Streets (1952–1960) debuts on ABC.
- 27 April – The Chase debuts on NBC.
- 8 June – Best Plays debuts on NBC.
- 8 June – December Bride debuts on CBS.
- September – KFMA (1580 AM) of Davenport, Iowa signs on the air, with a power of 250 watts. It is the first station in the Quad-Cities market to broadcast country music on a regular basis.
- 29 October – Jason and the Golden Fleece debuts on NBC.

== Closings ==
- 1 January – The Count of Monte Cristo ends its run on network radio (Mutual).
- 19 January – Chance of a Lifetime ends its run on network radio (ABC).
- 1 February – Winner Take All ends its run on network radio (CBS).
- 20 April – The Big Show ends its run on network radio (NBC).
- 13 June – Mr. District Attorney ends its run on ABC.
- 25 June – Big Town ends its run on network radio (CBS).
- 27 June – Against the Storm ends its run on network radio (ABC).
- 27 June – The Guiding Light ends its run on NBC. It continues on CBS television until 2009.
- 27 June – Mark Trail ends its run on network radio (ABC).
- 16 September – The Mysterious Traveler ends its run on network radio (Mutual.
- 5 December – The Green Hornet ends its run on ABC.
- 26 December – Big Sister ends its run on network radio (CBS).
- 26 December – The Jack Smith Show ends its run on network radio (CBS).
- 27 December – Hopalong Cassidy ends its run on network radio (CBS Mountain States regional network).
- 28 December – Café Istanbul ends its run on network radio (ABC).
- 30 December – Defense Attorney ends its run on network radio (ABC).

== Births ==
- 5 February – Mark Fuhrman, American police detective, author and radio host
- 11 March
  - Douglas Adams, English writer (The Hitchhiker's Guide to the Galaxy) (died 2001))
  - James Fleet, English actor
- 12 March – Chris Needs, Welsh radio host (died 2020)
- 18 March – Will Durst, American political satirist and comedian, radio host
- 22 March – Bob Costas, American radio and television sportscaster
- 27 April – Larry Elder, American political talk radio host
- 6 May – Fred Newman, American touring public radio sound effects man for A Prairie Home Companion, author of MouthSounds and actor
- 13 June – Tony Bruno, American nationally syndicated sports radio talk show host, veteran of WIP and KNBR; presided over the launch of both ESPN Radio and Fox Sports Radio
- 5 July – Hillbilly Jim, American professional wrestler and radio host
- 13 July – Ricardo Boechat, Argentine-Brazilian journalist, anchor and radio announcer (died 2019)
- 8 August – Robin Quivers, African American radio personality (The Howard Stern Show)
- 10 December – Clive Anderson, English broadcast presenter, comedy writer and barrister

== Deaths ==
- 19 April – Steve Conway, British singer (b. 1920)
