= 1910 in radio =

The year 1910 in radio involved some significant events.

== Events ==
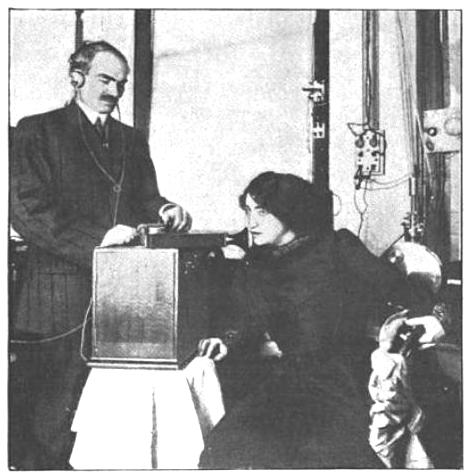
24 February broadcast by Mme. Mariette Mazarin of the Manhattan Opera Company over Lee de Forest's New York City station.

- 13 January — Lee de Forest broadcast grand opera performance from the stage of the Metropolitan Opera House in New York City.
- 24 June — Wireless Ship Act of 1910 passed by the United States Congress, requiring all ships of the United States traveling over 200 miles (322 km) off the coast and carrying over 50 passengers to be equipped with wireless radio equipment with a range of 100 miles (161 km).

== Births ==
- 16 January – Dwight Weist, American actor and announcer (d. 1991)
- 22 March – Elisabeth Barker, British current affairs radio administrator (d. 1986)
- 10 April – Olive Shapley, English radio documentary producer and broadcaster (d. 1999)
- 3 May – Norman Corwin, American writer-producer (d. 2011)
- 17 June – Sam Costa, British crooner, voice actor and disc jockey (d. 1981)
- 21 August – D. G. Bridson, English radio producer and author (d. 1980)
- 1 September – Charles Maxwell, Scottish-born radio producer (d. 1998)
