= Radio San Paolo =

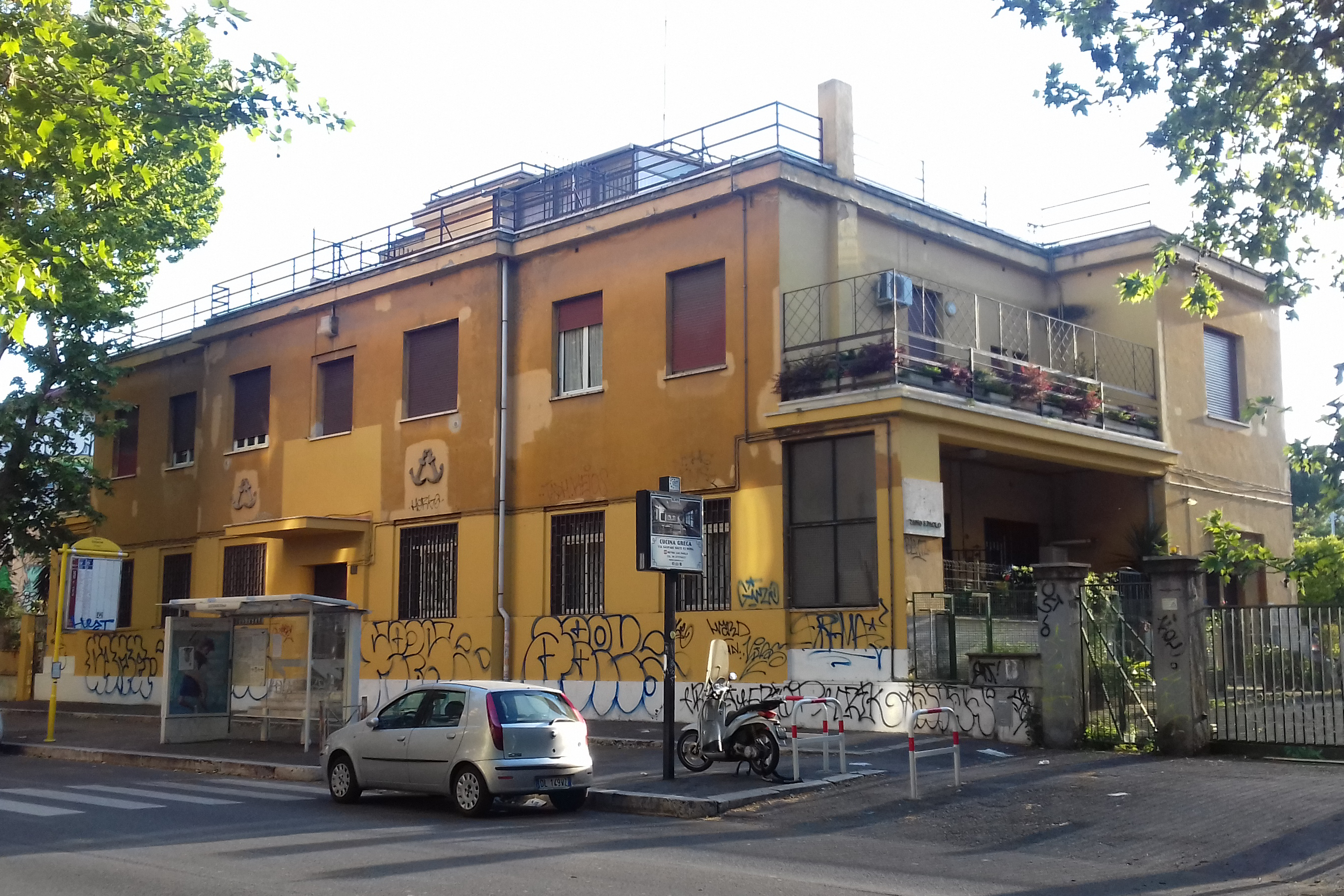

Rome; Italy
- Frequency: 42.9–27.3 kHz

Ownership
- Owner: Italian navy

History
- First air date: 1917

Technical information
- Transmitter coordinates: 41°51′17″N 12°28′37″E

The Regia Marina Radiotelegraphic Station, better known as Radio San Paolo, was a long, medium and short wave Italian military broadcaster and military reception center located on the southern outskirts of Rome. Inaugurated in 1917 under the command of Regia Marina, the station remained in Navy service for much of the Second World war and then lost its importance until the disposal and transformation of its premises into civilian flats.

== History ==
The center was established towards the end of the first decade of the twentieth century to intensify communications with the colonies Italian on the Red Sea.

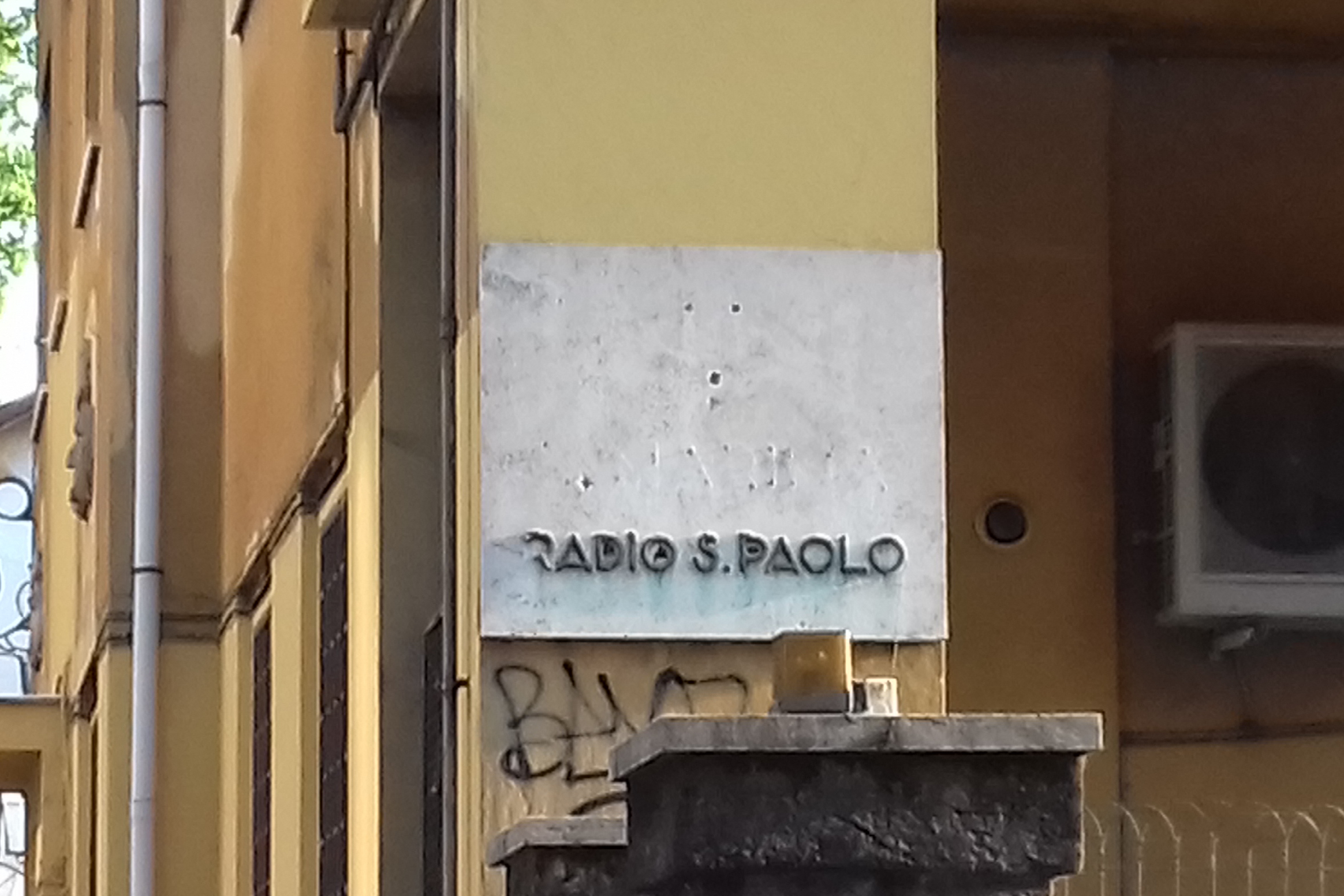
What is left of Radio San Paolo

The chosen location was along Via Ostiense across from the current building at number 204 in an uninhabited area and about 250 meters beyond the basilica of St. Paul in the direction of the sea. The systems, installed under the supervision of Giancarlo Vallauri and marine lieutenants Giuseppe Pession and Bernardo Micchiardi, were high-power long wave arched Poulsen transmitters (250 kW) functioning at frequencies from 42.9 to 27.3 kHz (7,000 to 11,000 meters wavelength). As antenna, a triangular set-up with three 200-meter-high iron trusses was used along the Valco di San Paolo.

At the time these transmitters were able to reach the radio stations of Massaua and Mogadiscio. The radio was also used for civil purposes, in particular to keep in touch with the diplomatic corps abroad.

To deal with the problems of disruption and monsoons that occurred on the eastern coast of Africa, the station was also equipped with a shortwave transmitter of 6 kW at 32 meters(~ 9 300 kHz) and 66 meters (~ 4 500 kHz), together with a long wave system at 10,750 meters (28 kHz) and medium wave systems at 2,250 (~ 133 kHz) and 4,800 meters (~ 62 kHz). These were installed in 1928.

St. Paul became a famous radio station in 1928 while maintaining contact with support ship The City of Milan. This research ship was crewed by Umberto Nobile and his sailors and was active in the northern Atlantic after the disaster of the airship Italy in the North Pole region.

Young Soviet Nikolay Schmidt captured an SOS signal transmitted by the Marxist expedition of Giuseppe Biagi near Arkhangelsk after days of unsuccessful attempts. Schmidt made contact with the San Paolo station. The station then coordinated efforts and assisted The City of Milan to establish direct contact with the survivors of the crew. Relief was then brought by the Soviet icebreaker Krasin.

After 8 September 1943 and the fall of Rome into German hands the radio, which as a strategic objective ensured communications with most of the fleet, was militarily occupied by the Nazi troops.

After the end of the war and the urbanization of the area the station was resized and finally closed, in particular due to construction of INA and IACP houses in Valco San Paolo in the early 1950s. Nowadays the buildings that survived are used partly for civilian housing and also as headquarters of the LGBT culture circle Mario Mieli.
