= 1924 in radio =

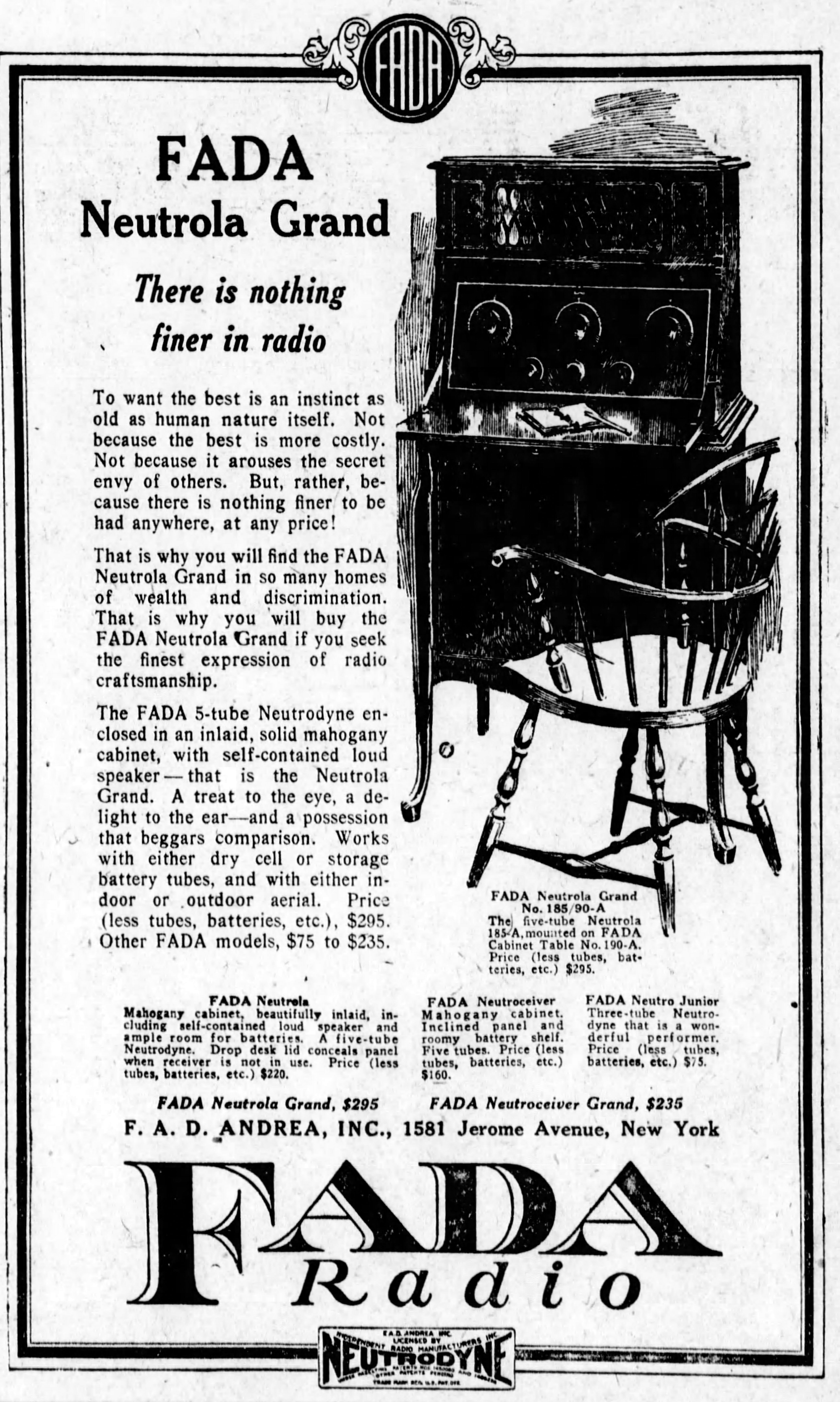
FADA Neutrola Grand Radio ad, featured in The Brooklyn Daily Eagle, 26 December 1924

1924 in radio details the internationally significant events in radio broadcasting for the year 1924.

== Events ==
- 1 January – The United Kingdom Meteorological Office issues its first broadcast Shipping Forecast, at this time called Weather Shipping.
- 5 January – The British Broadcasting Company makes its first broadcast of a religious service from a church (St Martin-in-the-Fields, London, with Rev. Dick Sheppard).
- 15 January – The world's first original adult radio play, Danger by Richard Hughes, is broadcast by the British Broadcasting Company from its studios in London.
- 5 February – Hourly Greenwich Time Signal from the Royal Greenwich Observatory in the United Kingdom is broadcast for the first time.
- 8 February – John Joseph Carty, vice-president at American Telephone & Telegraph Company, speaks on the first nationwide radio hookup in the United States, between New York's WEAF, Washington, D.C.'s WCAP and Providence's WJAR. He is heard by an estimated fifty million people.
- 12 February – President of the United States Calvin Coolidge makes the first presidential political speech on radio. Broadcast from New York City, it is carried by five stations. It is listened to by an estimated five million people.
- 2 March – MIRAG, the Mitteldeutsche Rundfunk Aktien-Gesellschaft (Central German Broadcasting Co. Ltd), begins radio transmissions from Leipzig in Germany.
- 28 March – First British Broadcasting Company broadcast from Plymouth (station 5PY).
- 30 March – The Deutsche Stunde in Bayern GmbH (German Hour in Bavaria Ltd), begins radio transmissions from Munich in Germany.
- 1 April – SWR, the Südwestdeutsche Rundfunkdienst A.G (South-west German Broadcasting Service Ltd), begins radio transmissions from Frankfurt am Main in Germany.
- 23 April – First broadcast by King George V of the United Kingdom, opening the British Empire Exhibition at Wembley Stadium.
- 2 May – NORAG, the Nordische Rundfunk Aktien-Gesellschaft (Northern Broadcasting Co. Ltd), begins radio transmissions from Hamburg in Germany.
- 12 May – SÜRAG, the Süddeutsche Rundfunk Aktien-Gesellschaft (South German Broadcasting Co. Ltd), begins radio transmissions from Stuttgart in Germany.
- 19 May – The British Broadcasting Company first broadcasts cellist Beatrice Harrison apparently duetting live with a wild nightingale in a Surrey garden; not until 2022 is it admitted that the 'bird' was probably a siffleur (professional whistler).
- 26 May – SFAG, the Schlesische Funkstunde Aktien-Gesellschaft (Silesian Radio Hour Ltd), begins radio transmissions from Breslau in Germany (modern-day Wrocław in Poland).
- 4 June – The British Broadcasting Company first broadcasts Henry Hall (bandleader), from the Gleneagles Hotel in Scotland.
- 10 June – ORAG, the Ostmarken-Rundfunk Aktien-Gesellschaft (Eastern Marches Broadcasting Co. Ltd), begins radio transmissions from Königsberg in Germany (modern-day Kaliningrad in Russia).
- 2 August – The Deutsche Stunde in Bayern opens its second station, in Nuremberg.
- 15 August – The British Broadcasting Company's Hull relay station, 6KH, goes on air.
- 27 August –Unione radiofonica italiana (URI, a predecessor of RAI), Italy's first licensed broadcasting company, is formed in Turin with backing from the Marconi Company.
- 14 September – 2BE Belfast, operated by the British Broadcasting Company, opens as the first official radio station in Northern Ireland.
- 15 September – Inauguration of Radio Agen in south-west France; the station is privately owned but supported by the département of Lot-et-Garonne.
- 6 October – URI begins regular broadcasting from station 1-RO in Rome.
- 10 October – WEFAG, the Westdeutsche Funkstunde Aktien-Gesellschaft (West German Radio Hour Ltd), begins radio transmissions from Münster in Germany.
- 14 November – Station EAJ-1 Radio Barcelona, the first radio station to receive an official licence from the Spanish government, begins regular broadcasting.
- 15 November – Nederlandse Christelijke Radio Vereniging (NCRV) is established in the Netherlands.
- 30 November – NORAG opens its second station, in Bremen.
- 1 October – RAVAG, the Radio-Verkehrs-Aktien-Gesellschaft (Radio Communication Co. Ltd) – a collaboration between government and private industry – is given responsibility for all radio broadcasting in Austria.
- 12 December – The British Broadcasting Company's Swansea relay station in Wales, 5SX, goes on air.

== Debuts ==
- 12 February – The Eveready Hour debuts on WEAF. It is considered the world's first commercially sponsored variety program.
- 20 December – First broadcast of the Norwegian children's radio programme Lørdagsbarnetimen ("Saturday children's hour") – on NRK radio, ending in 2010.

== Births ==
- 11 February – Douglas Smith, English radio announcer (d. 1972)
- 23 April – Norman Painting, English actor (d. 2009)
- 1 May – Dennis Main Wilson, English broadcast comedy producer (d. 1997)
- 12 May – Tony Hancock, English comedian (d. 1968)
- 21 August – Jack Buck, American sportscaster (d. 2002)
- 15 November – Mike Raven, born (Austin) Churton Fairman, English DJ, actor and sculptor (d. 1997)
- 26 December – Jimmy Blaine, born James William Bunn, American radio and television performer, producer, and writer (d. 1967)
