= 1915 in radio =

The year 1915 in radio involved some significant events.

== Events ==
- 29 September – A transcontinental radio telephone message is transmitted from the United States Navy radio station at Arlington, Virginia, to the naval radio station at Mare Island, California; then a few hours later relayed to Honolulu.

== Births ==
- 3 January – Frank Shozo Baba, Japanese-born radio broadcaster (died 2008)
- 25 January – Ewan MacColl, British folk singer-songwriter, actor and labour activist, co-creator of the radio ballad (died 1989)
- 6 May – Orson Welles, American actor known for The War of the Worlds broadcast (died 1985)
- 28 August – Max Robertson, British sports commentator (died 2009)
