= 1918 in radio =

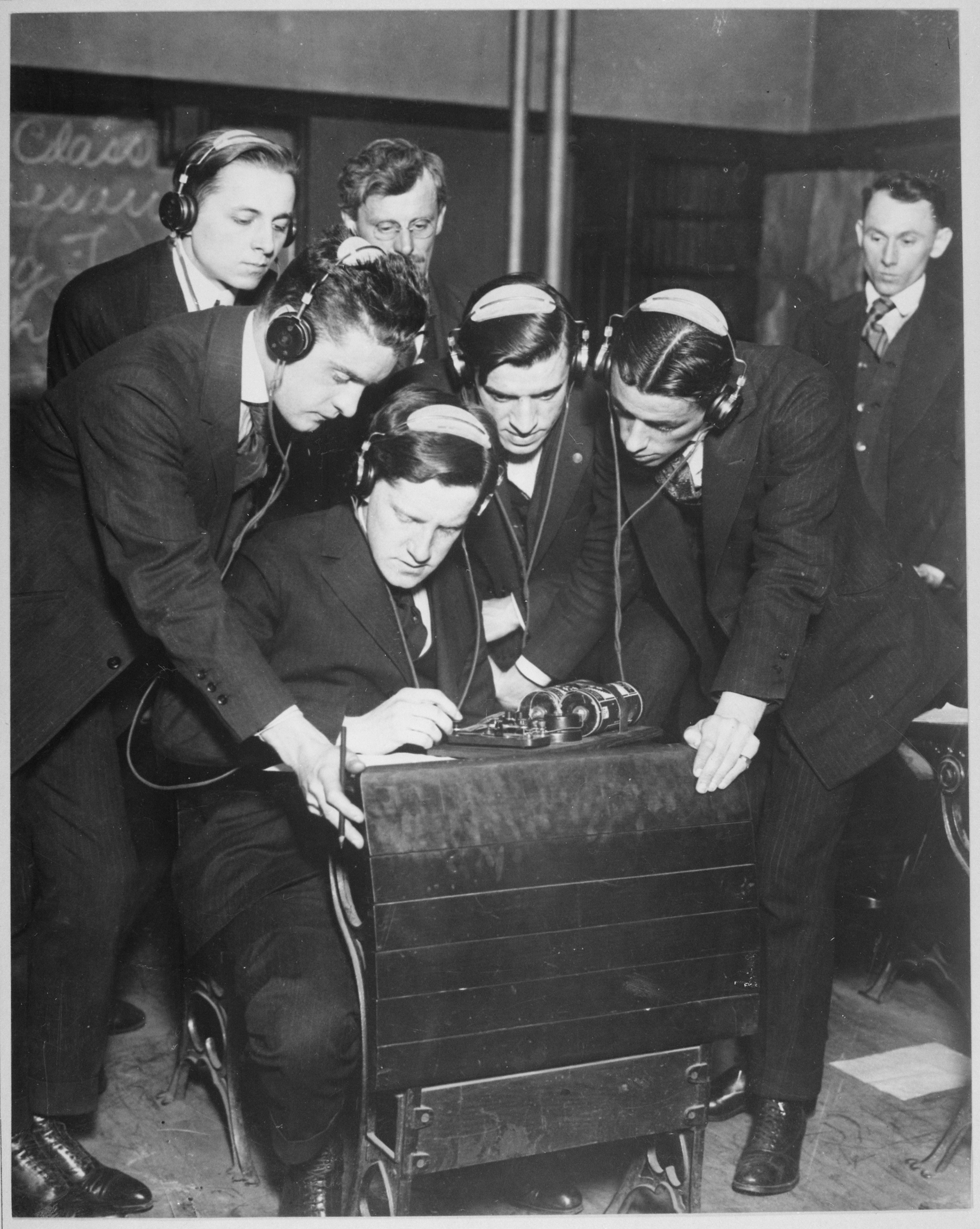
Government preparing men for radio work under direction of Federal Vocational Board. Student transmitting a message to four of his classmates in the class room at the Stuyvesant Evening High School, New York. Western Newspaper Union. April 2018.

1918 in radio details the internationally significant events in radio broadcasting for the year 1918.

== Events ==
- 10 April – Alexander M. Nicolson files a patent for the radio crystal oscillator.
- 22 September – The first radio broadcast from the United Kingdom to Australia is made by AWA to the home of Ernest Fisk in Sydney.
- 11 November – Armistice ends World War I.
- Edwin Howard Armstrong develops the superheterodyne receiver.
- A 200 kW alternator starts operating at Station NFF, the United States Navy station at Somerset, New Jersey, the most powerful radio transmitter at this time.

== Births ==
- 1 January – Wolf Mittler, German broadcaster (d. 2002)
- 16 April – Spike Milligan, British comedian, writer, musician, poet and playwright (d. 2002)
- 26 April – William Hardcastle, British radio news presenter (d. 1975)
- 18 June – Isobel Barnett, British broadcasting personality (suicide 1980)
- 8 August – Salty Brine, American radio host (d. 2004)
- 9 August – Giles Cooper, Anglo-Irish broadcast dramatist (d. 1966)
- 4 September – Paul Harvey, American radio broadcaster (d. 2009)
- 22 September – Betty Wragge, American actress of the Golden Age of Radio (d. 2002)
- 26 September – John Zacherle, American television and radio host, singer and voice actor (d. 2016)
- 7 September – Billy Graham, American minister whose sermons were broadcast on radio (d. 2018)
