= Elisabeth Barker =

English journalist, historian and civil servant

Elisabeth Barker (22 March 1910 – 19 March 1986) was an English journalist, historian and civil servant.

== Life ==
Elisabeth Barker was born in Oxford, the daughter of Emily and Ernest Barker. She was educated at St Paul's Girls' School and Lady Margaret Hall, Oxford where she read mods and greats. In summer 1932 she visited her brother Arthur, then Times correspondent in Vienna, and continued traveling across Eastern Europe and the Balkans. In 1934 she joined the BBC, working in the news library and later as a sub-editor in overseas news.

== Works ==
- Truce in the Balkans, 1948
- Macedonia: its place in Balkan power politics, 1950
- Britain in a Divided Europe 1945-1970, 1971
- The Cold War, 1972
- Austria: 1918-1972, 1973
- The Common Market, 1973
- Churchill and Eden at War, 1978
- The British between the Superpowers (1945-1950), 1983
