= KROS =

- Clinton, Iowa; United States
- Frequency: 1340 kHz C-QUAM AM stereo
- Branding: KROS 105.9 FM 1340 AM

Programming
- Format: Variety
- Affiliations: ABC News Radio; Fox Sports Radio; Compass Media Networks; Premiere Networks; USA Radio Network; Westwood One; CNBC; WQAD-TV

Ownership
- Owner: KROS Broadcasting, Inc

History
- First air date: 1941

Technical information
- Licensing authority: FCC
- Class: C
- Power: 1,000 watts
- Transmitter coordinates: 41°51′36″N 90°12′18″W
- Translator: 105.9 K290CL (Clinton)

Links
- Public license information: Public file; LMS
- Website: www.krosradio.com

KROS (1340 AM) is a commercial radio station serving the Clinton, Iowa area. The station primarily broadcasts a Variety format featuring oldies, sports and news. KROS is licensed to KROS Broadcasting, Inc. and is a CBS news affiliate.

== History ==
Prior to CBS, KROS aired hourly news from CNN, and had also been an affiliate of the Mutual Broadcasting System until that network's demise.

The station began broadcasting in 1941, and was in AM Stereo at one time. KROS originally also had an FM signal at 96.1 MHz, which had the call letters KROS-FM and later KSAY; the FM signal went on the air in 1947. Ownership was split in 1986, with the FM station moving to Davenport, Iowa and adopting an adult contemporary format as KLIO-FM ("K-Lite"); the station is now owned by Clear Channel and – with its adult contemporary format – has the call letters KMXG ("Mix 96").

In February 1985, a fire in the downtown Clinton building housing the studios of KROS and KSAY knocked the station off the air for several days. Once a new studio and equipment was set up, the station returned to the air, with a two-hour program recapping the events of the week and thanking volunteers and others for their support and help.

NASCAR on FOX pit reporter Krista Voda once worked with the station, hosting its late night show in the mid '90s.

On November 12, 2014, KROS added an FM translator at 105.9 FM (K290CL).
