= 1954 in radio =

The year 1954 saw a number of significant happenings in radio broadcasting history.

== Events ==
- 20 January – The National Negro Network is formed in the United States.
- 25 January – First broadcast of Dylan Thomas's radio play Under Milk Wood, two months after its author's death, with Richard Burton as 'First Voice', on the BBC Third Programme in the United Kingdom.
- 1 February – KECA and KECA-FM, two Los Angeles stations, change their call letters to KABC and KABC-FM respectively, reflecting their new ownership by ABC-United Paramount Theaters.
- 1 April – ABC-United Paramount Theaters, owners of WENR-Chicago, purchase time-share counterpart WLS-Chicago from Sears, Roebuck and Co., and merge both stations under the WLS call sign (their FM sister station would keep the WENR call sign until 1965).
- 4 April – Legendary orchestral conductor Arturo Toscanini experiences a brief lapse of concentration during an all-Wagner concert with the NBC Symphony Orchestra broadcast live from Carnegie Hall in New York City, which causes the network to briefly substitute a recording of Brahms' Symphony No. 1. Toscanini then retires from public concerts and the orchestra is disbanded.
- 15 July – The Nippon Broadcasting System initiates its first official regular broadcasting service in Tokyo, Japan.
- 18 October – Texas Instruments announces the development of the first commercial transistor radio. The Regency TR-1 goes on sale the following month.
- 17 November – WJW (AM) in Cleveland, Ohio (later WKNR) is sold by William M. O'Neill to Storer Broadcasting.

== Debuts ==
- 3 January – Man's Right to Knowledge debuts on CBS.
- 3 January – WSTN debuts as a 1 kW daytimer at St. Augustine, Florida.
- 9 January – Roadshow debuts on NBC. Starring Bill Cullen, the three-hour weekly program is considered a forerunner of the network's Monitor, which began a year later.
- 6 April – Crime and Peter Chambers debuts on NBC.
- 2 September – Dr. Sixgun debuts on NBC.
- 25 October – WMSN in Raleigh, North Carolina debuts as a 500 watt daytimer at Raleigh, North Carolina.
- 2 November – Hancock's Half Hour debuts on BBC radio.

== Endings ==
- 3 January – Quiz Kids ends its run on network radio (CBS).
- 6 January – Dr. Christian ends its run on network radio (CBS).
- 15 January – Double or Nothing ends its run on network radio (ABC).
- 16 January – The Baron and the Bee ends its run on network radio (NBC).
- 5 March – Family Skeleton ends its run on network radio (CBS).
- 12 March – House of Glass ends its run on network radio (NBC).
- 26 March – Front Page Farrell ends its run on network radio (NBC).
- 27 March – Twenty Questions ends its run on network radio.
- 28 March – Bulldog Drummond ends its run on network radio (Mutual).
- 30 March – Rocky Fortune, a half-hour detective drama starring Frank Sinatra, aired its final episode on NBC.
- 22 May – The Armstrong Theater of Today ends its run on network radio (CBS).
- 27 May – Time for Love ends its run on network radio (CBS).
- 18 June – The Adventures of Ozzie and Harriet ends its run on network radio (ABC).
- 24 June – The Six Shooter ends its run on network radio (NBC).
- 9 July – Can You Top This? ends its run on network radio (NBC).
- 1 August – Broadway Is My Beat ends its run on network radio (CBS).
- 7 September – Crime and Peter Chambers ends its run on network radio (NBC).
- 25 September – Escape ends its run on CBS.
- 25 September – Stars over Hollywood ends its run on network radio (CBS).
- 30 September – On Stage (radio show) ends its run on network radio (CBS).
- 3 September – The Lone Ranger ends its run of original radio shows.
- 27 November – The Falcon ends its run on network radio (Mutual).
- 26 December – Man's Right to Knowledge ends its run on network radio (CBS).
- (undated) – The Jack Berch Show ends its run on network radio (ABC).

== Births ==
- 12 January – Howard Stern, American shock jock radio personality
- 22 August – Kurt Andersen, American novelist, columnist and public radio host
- 26 August – Steve Wright, English DJ
- 27 August – Andrew Marshall, English comedy scriptwriter
- 8 September – Joe Cipriano, American voice over actor and radio personality
- 3 October – Al Sharpton, American activist, minister, and radio talk show host
- 20 November – Steve Dahl, American radio personality and humorist
- 27 November – Arthur Smith, English comedian and radio presenter
- 5 December – Peter Arbogast, American sportscaster

== Deaths ==
- 10 January – Chester Wilmot, Australian war correspondent, killed in accident to BOAC Flight 781 (born 1911)
- 4 November – Joy Hathaway, Canadian-born American actress of the Golden Age of Radio
