= 1916 in radio =

The year 1916 in radio involved some significant events.

== Events ==
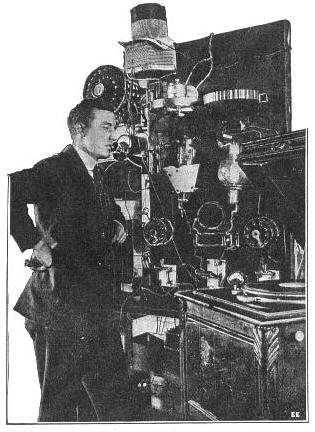
Charles Logwood broadcasting at 2XG in New York City in 1916.

- 22 February – Ernst Alexanderson is issued a United States patent for a tuned radio frequency receiver.
- 7 November – Radio station 2XG, located in the Highbridge section of New York City, makes the first audio broadcast of United Station presidential election returns.
- 4 December – First regular broadcasts on 9XM – Wisconsin state weather, delivered in Morse code.

== Births ==
- 5 January – Alfred Ryder, American actor (died 1995)
- 6 March – Virginia Gregg, American broadcast actress (died 1986)
- 4 July – Iva Toguri D'Aquino, Japanese American broadcaster (died 2006)
