= Laure Leprieur =

French radio personality (1919–1999)

Laure Leprieur (1919–1999) was a radio personality in France, although she never participated in a radio show. She gained nationwide fame under the name Madame Leprieur d'Agon-Coutainville and was also nicknamed Madame «80 000 Questions». She created questions in her free time for the popular French radio show Les Grosses Têtes, which is broadcast every weekday afternoon by RTL.

The principle of this show is that the anonymous listeners send cultural or obscure questions to the famous guests of the day (actors, comedians and entertainers), and get a small cash prize if the question is not answered correctly. Of course the questions are just a pretext for the guests to exercise their wit and good humor.

In fact, Madame Leprieur did not remain anonymous. From 1977 to 1998, Laure Leprieur, who lived in Agon-Coutainville, Normandy, sent more than 80,000 questions to Les Grosses Têtes guests and won about 150,000 French francs in cash prizes. Her questions were written in a total of fifty notebooks which her son Michel has kept. In order to send her questions to RTL, Laure Leprieur mailed a letter every day, always with the same number of sheets - five - corresponding to the maximum weight allowed by the postal rate she used.

== Examples of questions by Madame Leprieur ==
- Who is Charley Michaelis? — A.: The baby in the Cadum soap vintage print ad (Cadum is a brand of French soap).
- What is an engastrimyth? — A.: A ventriloquist.
- What is ailurophobia? — A.: A fear of cats.
- Which animal species mate ventrally, but upside down ? — A.: The earthworm.

== Bibliography ==
- 2000 Questions pour Grosses têtes - Laure Leprieur - Cosmopole Ed., 2005 - ISBN 2-84630-026-7
