= 1927 in radio =

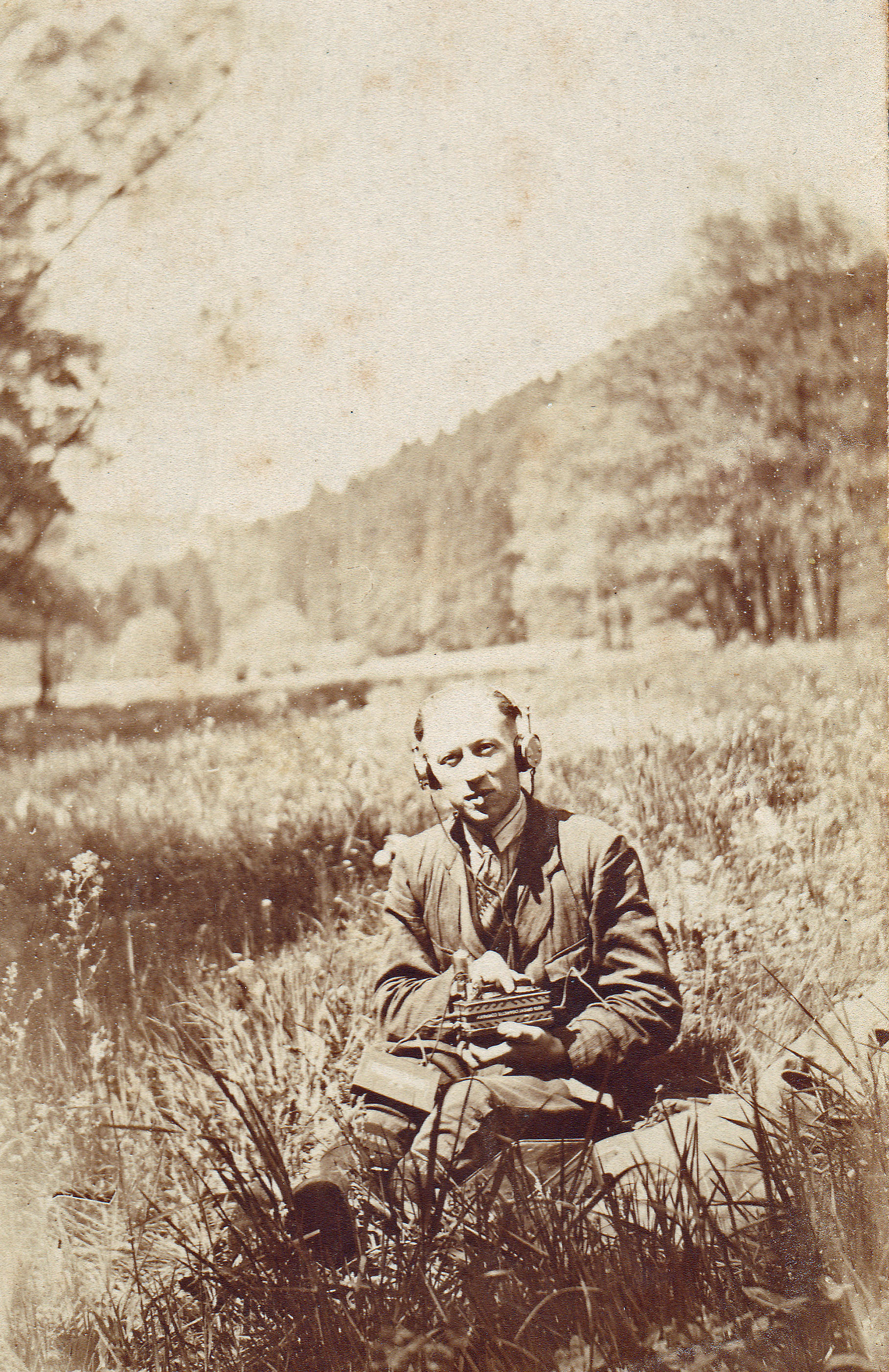
A man listens to a homemade portable radio in the Harz Mountains, Germany, during Pentecost in 1927.

The year 1927 saw a number of significant happenings in radio broadcasting history.

== Events ==
- 1 January
  - NBC in the United States makes the first ever coast-to-coast network radio broadcast of a Rose Bowl Game.
  - NBC takes control of WJZ in New York City—the beginning of the NBC Blue Network.
  - The British Broadcasting Corporation (BBC) takes over the activities and operations of the former British Broadcasting Company (1922–26). John Reith becomes the first Director-General.
- 2 January – The Reverend Claude Lhande makes the first religious broadcast on French radio, beginning a series of talks on Radio Paris entitled L'Évangile par dessus les Toits.
- 15 January – First live sports broadcast on BBC Radio in the United Kingdom: the rugby union international England v Wales is commented on by Teddy Wakelam.
- 21 January – A performance in Chicago, Illinois, of Faust is the first opera to be broadcast over a national radio network.
- 22 January – The BBC transmits the first ever running commentary on an English Football League match: Arsenal v. Sheffield United at Highbury.
- 16 February – JODK now HLKA, KBS Radio One of Seoul, an official inauguration service start in the Provisional Government of Korea.
- 23 February – The Federal Radio Commission (later to be replaced by the Federal Communications Commission) is created by Calvin Coolidge.
- 4 March – First broadcast from the Wileńskie Biuro Radiotechniczne radio station in Vilnius (then in Poland, now in Lithuania).
- 11 March – Station PCJJ, based at the Philips Laboratories in Eindhoven, makes the first short-wave broadcasts from the Netherlands to the Dutch East Indies. PCJJ is thought to be the first distinct short-wave service having its own programming rather than simulcasting a domestic broadcaster.
- 31 March – The Philips company scores a publicity coup when Queen Wilhelmina of the Netherlands addresses the colonial population via its PCJJ transmitter.
- 14 April – Radio PTT Nord begins regular transmissions from Lille.
- 6 May – Türk Telsiz-Telefon Anonym Şirketi ("Turkish Wireless Telephony Ltd") begins radio broadcasting in Istanbul.
- 1 June – Radio Rennes PTT begins regular transmissions in Brittany.
- 1 July – 23 Canadian radio stations combine forces to make the country's first nationwide broadcast, covering celebrations of the Diamond Jubilee of Confederation.
- 7 July – Christopher Stone presents a record programme on the BBC, becoming the first British disc jockey.
- 2 August – Under pressure by the Federal Government on the Ku Klux Klan (owners and operators of WTRC in Brooklyn, New York via their Twentieth [District] Republican Club), the station is relocated to Mount Vernon, Virginia, its call letters changed to WTFF, and ownership transferred to The Fellowship Forum, a newspaper published by the Klan. WTRC and WTFF were the origins of the current Washington, D.C., station WFED.
- 13 August – The Proms are broadcast over radio for the first time.
- 21 August – The BBC starts high-power medium-wave transmissions to the English Midlands from station 5GB (Daventry transmitting station) on 610 kHz.
- 17 November – The Italian broadcasting company URI (Unione Radiofonica Italiana) is absorbed by the state-owned EIAR (Ente Italiano per le Audizioni Radiofoniche), forerunner of today's RAI.
- 25 November – In Washington, D.C., the International Radio-Telegraphy Convention is signed by the representatives of eighty nations.
- December – Joshua Powell of Clacton in England begins the domestic radio relay service which will become Rediffusion.
- 28 December – AVRO (the Algemene Vereniging Radio Omroep) is established in the Netherlands.
- The Radio Orchestra, predecessor of the Finnish Radio Symphony Orchestra, is established in Helsinki.
- Vernon Bartlett is appointed the BBC's first foreign correspondent.
- Majestic Radios are first manufactured in the United States.

== Debuts ==
- January 1
  - The NBC Blue Network commences operations, on what was the former experimental RCA mini-network of stations. WJZ in New York (today WABC) serves as the Blue Network's flagship.
  - The United Independent Broadcasters network is established by New York talent agent Arthur Judson in Chicago, Illinois. The Columbia Phonograph Company (Columbia Records' parent company) surfaces as an investor in April, and the network is named after the company.
- January 24: Blue Monday Jamboree debuts on KFRC in San Francisco, California.
- February 18: Cities Service Concerts debuts on NBC after having had "trial broadcasts in local New York market" in 1925–26.
- April: WFCI at Pawtucket, Rhode Island, owned by Frank Crook, Inc., begins broadcasting. WFCI would sign off but re-establish itself in 1941.
- September 18: The Columbia Phonographic Broadcasting System is officially launched on 16 stations nationwide. Cigar manufacturer William S. Paley purchases the company a week later and shortens the name to Columbia Broadcasting System (CBS).
- October 12: Laundryland Lyrics debuts on NBC.
- November 7: WHBL in Sheboygan, Wisconsin begins broadcasting as WHBM before switching to their current calls the next year.

== Births ==
- January 24: Stan Brooks, American radio journalist (died 2013)
- January 27: Nancy Dickerson, American pioneering woman broadcast news reporter (died 1997)
- January 29: Don Morrow, American actor and announcer
- February 26: Gerald Priestland, English correspondent (died 1991)
- May 2: Ray Barrett, Australian actor (died 2009)
- June 24: Chuck Niles, American jazz disc jockey, uniquely on the Hollywood Walk of Fame (died 2004)
- June 25: Peter Clayton, English jazz disc jockey (died 1991)
- July 6: Alan Freeman, Australian-born disc jockey (died 2006)
- July 11: Herman Stok, Dutch broadcaster (died 2021)
- July 16: Serge Baudo, French conductor
- July 20: Heather Chasen, Singapore-born British actress (died 2020)
- September 11: Vernon Corea, Sri Lankan broadcaster (died 2002)
- November 3: Jan Stoeckart, Dutch composer, conductor, trombonist and radio producer (died 2017)
- November 9: Ken Dodd, English comedian (died 2018)
- November 29: Vin Scully, American baseball sportscaster (died 2022)
- December 17: Robert Robinson, English presenter (died 2011)
