= 1905 in radio =

The year 1905 in radio involved some significant events.

== Events ==
- Reginald Fessenden invents the superheterodyne receiver.
- Marconi invents the directional antenna.

== Births ==
- 14 January – Mildred Albert, American fashion commentator, broadcast personality and fashion show producer (d. 1991)
- 20 April – Inés Rodena, Cuban broadcast writer (d. 1985)
- 14 May – Herb Morrison, American radio reporter (d. 1989)
- 23 June – Mary Livingstone, American radio comedian (d. 1983)
- 4 October – Leslie Mitchell, British announcer (d. 1985)
- 21 November – Ted Ray, born Charles Olden, English comedian (d. 1977)
- Douglas Ritchie, British radio news editor and wartime propaganda broadcaster (d. 1967)
