= 1908 in radio =

The year 1908 in radio involved some significant events.

== Events ==
- 12 January – A long-distance radio message is sent from the Eiffel Tower for the first time.

== Births ==
- 13 February – Pauline Frederick, American news broadcaster (died 1990)
- 4 March – Franklin Engelmann, English radio presenter (died 1972)
- 26 March – Henry (Hank) Sylvern, American radio personality (died 1964)
- 25 April – Edward R. Murrow, American news broadcaster (died 1965)
- 7 May – Valentine Dyall, English character actor (died 1985)
- 1 June – Percy Edwards, English animal impersonator (died 1996)
- 27 June – David Davis, born William Eric Davis, English children's radio broadcaster (died 1996)
- 5 July – Don Dunphy, American sportscaster (died 1998)
- 31 July – Bill Shadel, American news anchor (died 2005)
- 15 August – Wynford Vaughan-Thomas, Welsh news broadcaster (died 1987)
- 11 September – Alvar Lidell, English radio announcer and newsreader (died 1981)
- 19 October – Alan Keith, born Alexander Kossoff, English actor and longtime classical music presenter (died 2003)
- 20 November – Alistair Cooke, English-born news commentator (died 2004)
- 20 December – Norman Hackforth, Indian-born British musical accompanist and radio "mystery voice" (died 1996)
