= 1986 in radio =

The year 1986 saw a number of significant events in radio broadcasting.

== Events ==
- January 8 – Long Beach's KNAC switches formats from an alternative/new wave format to a "Pure Rock" format. KNAC continued under that format until 1995.
- January 18 – The syndicated "American Country Countdown" expands from three to four hours. Much like "American Top 40" had more than seven years earlier, several new features are added, including a weekly recap of three No. 1 hits from the 1970s and playbacks of an artist's older hits.
- February 14 - Philippines's Magic 89.9 started regular operations.
- March 28 – More than 6,000 radio stations of all format types play "We Are the World" simultaneously at 10:15 a.m. Eastern Standard Time.
- June 2 – KOFM in Oklahoma City changed their calls to KMGL and flipped formats from a Top 40 (CHR) format to an Easy Listening/Adult Standards format under Transtar's Format 41.
- June 6 – Canada's premier Top 40 station, CHUM-AM Toronto, drops its hit format after almost 30 years and changes to "Favourites of Yesterday and Today." CHUM's corporate owner, CHUM Ltd., also switches several of its other major Top 40 stations, including CKGM in Montreal, CFRA in Ottawa, and CFUN in Vancouver, to AC formats during the year.
- July 22 - Philippines's DZMM, an AM station of ABS-CBN returns to the air, 6 months after the successful People Power Revolution, which led to the presidency of Corazon Aquino.
- August 11 – KFRC 610 AM in San Francisco drops its top 40 radio format after twenty years at 6 a.m., and changes to a 1940s Big Band format, redubbing itself as "Magic 61".
- October 22 – WNBC traffic reporter Jane Dornacker is killed in helicopter crash while live on air.

=== Unknown Dates ===
- After 40 years of playing the latest hits, including rock and roll since the mid 1950s, KSTT-Davenport, Iowa has its contemporary hit radio format retired in favor of a solid-gold oldies format.
- The ownership of KROS and KSAY-FM in Clinton, Iowa is split, with the FM station's studios moving to Davenport, Iowa. Call letters change to KLIO, with on-air identifier K-Lite, and the format switches from religious to adult contemporary. KROS, meanwhile, continues on with its community and middle-of-the-road format.
- Doug Banks joins WGCI-FM in Chicago, Illinois for nights, later mornings.
- CFGO in Ottawa, Ontario moves from 1440 AM to the more powerful 1200 AM frequency.

== Debuts ==
- January 11 – Adult Contemporary outlet KMGG/Los Angeles becomes KPWR ("Power 106"), debuting a Rhythmic Top 40 format.
- Moneytalk with Bob Brinker debuts on ABC Radio Network.

== Deaths ==
- January 17 – Joel Sebastian, 53, American radio personality at WLS, WCFL, WXYZ, WGN and WMAQ.
- January 24 – Gordon MacRae, 74, American actor and singer.
- February 1 – Mary Jane Higby, 76, American actress in the Golden Age of Radio.
- March 19 – Elisabeth Barker, 75, English current affairs radio administrator
- July 11 – Lucille Wall, 87, American actress.
- September 15 – Virginia Gregg, 70, American broadcast actress.
- October 22 – Jane Dornacker, 39, American rock musician, actress, comedian and WNBC traffic reporter.
