= 1921 in radio =

1921 in radio details the internationally significant events in radio broadcasting for the year 1921.

== Events ==
- 3 January – Station 9XM (now WHA), at the University of Wisconsin, Madison, transmits the first spoken weather forecast. The station had been broadcasting weather bulletins in Morse code since 1916.
- 4 March – Text of the speech, given at the U.S. Presidential inauguration in Washington, D.C. by Warren G. Harding, is read over KDKA in Pittsburgh, Pennsylvania.
- 5 August – First broadcast of a Major League baseball game is aired by KDKA, as the Pittsburgh Pirates defeat the Philadelphia Phillies 8–5 at Forbes Field.
- 19 September – First commercially licensed radio broadcasting station in the United States, WBZ, is launched by the Westinghouse Electric Corporation in Springfield, Massachusetts. It is the first broadcasting station to receive a license that explicitly specified operation on the 360 meter (833 kHz) wavelength formally assigned to the broadcasting service by regulations which became effective 1 December 1921.
- 20 September – KDKA and the Pittsburgh Post create the first "news room" and "news department".
- 25 September – The wireless telegraph station in Sofia makes the first public radio broadcast in Bulgaria: the retransmission of a concert from the German station at Nauen.
- 8 October – First broadcast of American football is on the air via KDKA as the University of Pittsburgh defeats West Virginia University at Pittsburgh's Forbes Field.
- 17 November – First radio broadcast in New Zealand is made by University of Otago physics professor Robert Jack.
- 26 November – First public radio broadcast in France, from the Compagnie générale de la télégraphie sans fil (CSF) Sainte-Assise transmitter.
- 27 November – U.S. bandleader Vincent Lopez and his group begin making a series of weekly 90-minute music broadcasts on Westinghouse-owned station WJZ in Newark, New Jersey (later WABC New York).
- 1 December – Effective date, in the U.S., for the first formal establishment of a broadcasting station service. (Limited Commercial license, for operation on 360 (833 kHz) and/or 485 (419) meters.)
- 24 December – First public radio broadcast from the Eiffel Tower in Paris.

== Births ==
- 25 February – Patricia Ryan, English-born American child actress, continues performing on radio until her death (d. 1949)
- 5 March – Charlez ar Gall, Breton-language broadcaster (d. 2010)
- 21 March – Antony Hopkins, British composer, pianist, conductor and music broadcaster (d. 2014)
- 1 April – Steve Race, English pianist-composer and radio presenter (d. 2009)
- 23 May – Humphrey Lyttelton, English jazz trumpeter and radio presenter (d. 2008)
- 19 July – Harold Camping, American religious broadcaster (d. 2013)
- 21 September – Jimmy Young, English singer and broadcaster (d. 2016)
- 19 October – Bern Bennett, American radio and television announcer (d. 2014)
- 24 December – Jimmy Clitheroe, English comic entertainer (d. 1973)

== See also ==
- List of oldest radio stations
- List of initial AM-band station grants in the United States
