= 1909 in radio =

The year 1909 in radio contained a number of significant events.

== Events ==
- 18 March – Einar Dessau uses a shortwave radio transmitter in Denmark.
- Charles Herrold begins experimental voice transmissions in San Jose. KCBS (AM) (formerly KQW) has considered these transmissions to be the beginning of its broadcast history.

== Births ==
- 6 February – René Cutforth, English broadcaster (died 1984)
- 3 March – Al Read, English radio comedian and sausage manufacturer (died 1987)
- 24 March – Tommy Trinder, English radio, stage and screen comedian (died 1989)
- 6 May – Loyd Sigmon, American amateur radio broadcaster (died 2004)
- 13 August – Brian Lawrance, Australian bandleader (died 1983)
- 1 December – Frank Gillard, English radio reporter and executive (died 1998)
- 23 December – Maurice Denham, English character actor (died 2002)
