= 1922 in radio =

Radio operator in 1922

1922 in radio details the internationally significant events in radio broadcasting for the year 1922.

== Events ==
- 6 February – Official inauguration of Radio Tour Eiffel from the Eiffel Tower in Paris, transmitting meteorological bulletins.
- 8 February – President of the United States, Warren G. Harding introduces the first radio in the White House.
- 19 February – Ed Wynn becomes the first big vaudeville star to join radio. The first broadcast is Wynn's The Perfect Fool and the station is WJZ, New York. This is also the first time in the world that a radio show is broadcast before a studio audience.
- 27 February – The first National Radio Conference, led by Herbert Hoover, is held in Washington, D.C.
- 10 March – In the United States, Variety magazine prints as its front-page headline "Radio Sweeping Country - 1,000,000 Sets in Use".
- 19 March – Broadcasting from the Shukhov Tower in Moscow begins with a concert of Russian music.
- 11 May – Station 2LO becomes the second radio station to broadcast regularly in the United Kingdom, operating from Marconi House in London, initially for one hour a day. The first radio sports commentary in Britain is made on the station when Arthur Burrows describes a boxing match between Ted "Kid" Lewis and Georges Carpentier at Olympia. No further sports broadcasts are made in the country until 1927 due to pressure from newspapers.
- 18 May – Warren G. Harding becomes the first United States president heard live on radio, when his speech to the United States Chamber of Commerce in Washington, D.C. is carried by Navy broadcasting station NOF.
- 28 May – The Detroit News Orchestra, the world's first radio orchestra (a symphonic ensemble organized specifically to play on radio), begins broadcasting from radio station WWJ in Detroit, Michigan.
- June – KZKZ is initiated on radio station
- 21 July – A limited commercial license is issued for operating radio station WIAE, in Vinton, Iowa, to station manager Marie Zimmerman, making WIAE the first radio station owned and operated by a woman.
- 22 August – The first national wireless exhibition is held at the Champ de Mars in Paris.
- 7 September – On the occasion of the centennial celebrations of Brazilian independence, President Epitácio Pessoa of Brazil makes the country's first radio broadcast.
- 17 September – First radio broadcasts in Russia.
- 2 October – CKAC, the first French language radio station in North America, launches in Montreal, Quebec.
- 7 October – Speaking on radio station 2LO, the Prince of Wales becomes the first member of the British royal family to make a public broadcast.
- 6 November – The privately owned French radio station Radiola begins regular transmissions.
- 14 November – London station 2LO transfers to the British Broadcasting Company and transmits its first two news bulletins, each read twice ("once quickly and once slowly" – to determine listener reaction).
- 15 November – The British Broadcasting Company opens its stations in Birmingham (5IT) and Manchester (2ZY).
- 4 December – A broadcasting "music ensemble" is formed in Pittsburgh by that city's KDKA; it will be known as the KDKA Orchestra.
- Walter Camp's "Daily Dozen" exercise regimen is first broadcast in the United States.

== Births ==
- 6 February – Denis Norden, English comedy scriptwriter and broadcast personality (died 2018)
- 23 April – Jack May, English actor (died 1997)
- 29 May – Mae Brussell, American radio personality and conspiracy theorist (died 1988)
- 10 June – Bill Kerr, South African-born Australian actor (died 2014)
- 17 July – Sid Collins, American motor-racing broadcaster (died 1977)
- 16 August – James Casey, English variety artist and radio comedy scriptwriter and producer (died 2011)
- 20 September – Dottie Ray, American radio host (died 2016)
- 5 October – Janie Joplin, American radio announcer and voice-over artist (died 2007)

== See also ==
- List of oldest radio stations
- List of initial AM-band station grants in the United States

== Sources ==
- Detroit News (1922). "WWJ—The Detroit News, The History of Radiophone Broadcasting". Detroit News. Detroit, Michigan: The Evening News Association.
