= 1907 in radio =

The year 1907 in radio involved some significant events.

== Events ==
- 17 October – Guglielmo Marconi initiates commercial transatlantic radio communications between his high power longwave wireless telegraphy stations in Clifden, Ireland and Glace Bay, Nova Scotia.

== Births ==
- 27 February – Kenneth Horne, English radio comedy performer (died 1969)
- 6 April – Richard Murdoch, English radio comedy actor (died 1990)
- 29 August – Lurene Tuttle, American radio actress (died 1986)
- 15 September – Jimmy Wallington, American radio personality (died 1972)
- 25 September – Raymond Glendenning, Welsh-born radio sports commentator (died 1974)
- 6 December – Helli Stehle, Swiss actress and radio presenter (died 2017)
