= 1904 in radio =

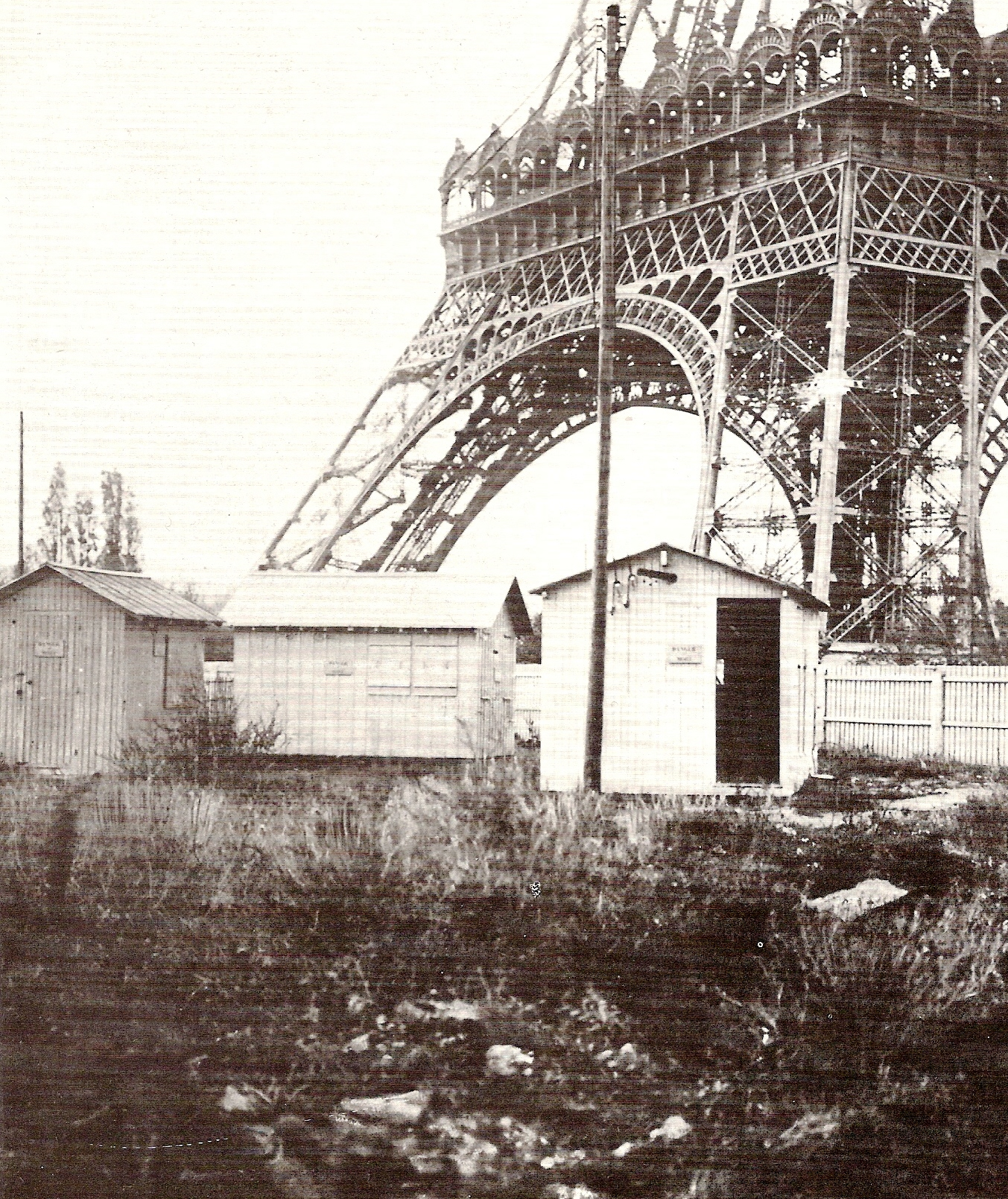
A small radio station installed at the base of the Eiffel Tower in 1904. Station was demolished in 1908 and replaced with an underground station in a square well

The year 1904 in radio involved some significant events.

== Events ==
- 7 January (with effect from 1 February) – The Marconi Company establishes "CQD" as one of the first international maritime radio distress signals.
- 24 May – The United States Patent Office awards Marconi a patent for a "Wireless signaling system".
- 11 October – Brazilian priest and researcher Roberto Landell de Moura is awarded a patent by the United States Patent Office for a "Wave-transmitter".
- 16 November – English electrical engineer John Ambrose Fleming, working for Marconi, is awarded a United States patent for the Fleming valve, the first thermionic vacuum tube, a two-electrode diode, which he calls the oscillation valve.
- First radio transmission of music, at Graz, Austria.

== Births ==
- 5 January – Anona Winn, Australian-born British broadcasting personality (d. 1994)
- 15 January – Charles Hill, British physician, medical and broadcast executive, politician and "The Radio Doctor" (d. 1989)
- 23 February – William L. Shirer, American war correspondent (d. 1993)
- 8 May – John Snagge, English radio newsreader (d. 1996)
- 24 May – Sefton Delmer, German-born British propaganda radio broadcaster (d. 1979)
- 14 August – Lindley Fraser, Scottish-born academic economist and broadcaster (d. 1963)
- 27 October – Les Mitchel, American radio and film producer, director and actor (d. 1975)
- 24 November – Pegeen Fitzgerald, American radio talk-show host (both alone and with her husband, Ed) on WOR and WJZ in New York City and Norcatur, Kansas (d. 1989)
