= 1912 in radio =

The year 1912 in radio involved some significant events.

== Events ==
- 15 April – Sinking of the RMS Titanic: CQD and SOS radio distress signals are sent.
- 5 July – International Radiotelegraph Convention signed in London.
- 13 August – The United States Congress passes the Radio Act of 1912, "An Act to regulate radio communication", requiring that all radio stations be licensed.
- 9YV, an experimental station operated by Kansas State University in Manhattan, Kansas, becomes the first radio station in the United States to offer a regularly scheduled daily broadcast (in morse code) of the weather forecast.

== Births ==
- 12 February – Eric Barker, English comic actor and writer (died 1990)
- 16 February – Del Sharbutt, American radio and television announcer (died 2002)
- 8 April – Mary Dee, born Mary Goode, African American DJ (died 1964)
- 24 June – Brian Johnston, English cricket commentator and radio presenter (died 1994)
- 1 July – Wallace Greenslade, English radio announcer (died 1961)
- 12 July - Jimmy McClain, American radio personality known as Dr. I. Q.
- 5 October – Tony Marvin, American radio and television announcer (died 1998)
- 25 November – Francis Durbridge, English scriptwriter (died 1998)
- 26 November – Eric Sevareid, American radio news reporter (died 1992)
- Rita Zucca, Italian American Axis propaganda broadcaster (died 1998)
