= 1911 in radio =

The year 1911 in radio involved some significant events.

== Events ==
- 21 October – The Junior Wireless Club Limited becomes the Radio Club of America at a meeting held in New York City.
- Wilhelm II, German Emperor, sends Telefunken engineers to West Sayville, New York to erect three 600-foot (180-m) radio towers.
- The first Australian long range (520 km) coastal radio station is established in Sydney.
- John Ambrose Fleming publishes An Elementary Manual of Radiotelegraphy and Radiotelephony in London.

== Births ==
- 15 January – Kathleen Wilson, American actress (d. 2005)
- 30 January – Hugh Marlowe, American actor (d. 1982)
- 21 June – Chester Wilmot, Australian war correspondent (d. 1954)
- 4 November – David Young, American radio producer, director and actor (d. 1969)
