= 1985 in radio =

The year 1985 in radio involved some significant events.

== Events ==
- January – "Solid Gold Country," the United Stations Programming Network’s country music spinoff of its oldies-focused "Solid Gold Scrapbook," switches from a three-hour-a-week show (from its debut in 1983) to a five-day-a-week program (with the option to air all five hours in as a weekly program). Under the new format, each hourly program covered a different topic, such as a profile on a singer, songwriter or producer; a look back at the popular songs from the current week in a past year, gold records from the current month and other topics under virtually every conceivable topic. Stan Martin (and a few weeks into the reformatted program) Joel Sebastian are the initial hosts under the new format, with Sebastian succeeded by Mike Fitzgerald in July 1985; Fitzgerald stepped down in early 1990, with Charlie Cook taking over for the rest of the run. Producer remains Ed Salamon, with country music journalist Tom Roland continuing as lead writer. The program will run through September 1993 and air roughly 2,300 one-hour shows.
- January 1 – CKLW Windsor, Ontario adopts the Music of Your Life format.
- February – A fire in downtown Clinton, Iowa destroys the studios for KROS (1340 AM) and KSAY (96.1 FM), knocking both stations off the air for several days. When the station returned to the air in a new studio, the first program was a two-hour show devoted to the fire and volunteers that helped get KROS/KSAY back on the air.
- March 28 – A Roger Waters concert is broadcast live from Radio City Music Hall. It is the first time that holophonics is used for a live radio broadcast.
- April 27 - Commercial private broadcasting begins in Finland as Radio Lakeus starts transmissions in Nivala.
- September 14/15 - Airdate of the famed "dead dog dedication" episode of American Top 40. During the recording, host Casey Kasem became upset after realizing that a "Long Distance Dedication" requesting a ballad ("Shannon" by Henry Gross) was in his opinion improperly programmed after an upbeat song ("Dare Me" by The Pointer Sisters) and went on a profanity-laced tirade. The aired program did not include Kasem's rant, although the outtake has been uploaded to various video sharing sites.
- The year brings other significant changes in Detroit radio, as WDRQ flips from urban contemporary to soft AC as WLTI, and WCLS flips from AC to rock-based Top 40 as WDTX.

== Debuts ==
- WZLX (100.7 FM) in Boston debuts with the classic rock format.
- Bayerischer Rundfunk in Munich debuts with Bit, byte, gebissen, the first radio program on computer topics in Germany.
- In July, after stunting with Christmas carols, WKJJ-FM "Magic 100" Louisville, Kentucky flips from Adult Contemporary to CHR as WDJX.
- WJJF/1180-Hope Valley, Rhode Island signs on October 5.

== Births ==
- December 17: Greg James, English DJ

== Deaths ==
- January 3: Bryna Raeburn, American radio and voice actress
- February 26: Charita Bauer, American radio and television actress.
- October 10: Orson Welles, American actor and radio personality (The Mercury Theatre on the Air)
- October 15: Ted Steele, American bandleader, musician and host of radio and television programs.

== See also ==
- Radio broadcasting
