= 2002 in radio =

| List of years in radio | (table) |
- … 1992; 1993; 1994; 1995; 1996; 1997; 1998; 1999; 2000; 2001; 2002; 2003; 2004; 2005; 2006; 2007; 2008; 2009; 2010; 2011; 2012 …
- In music 1999 2000 2001 2002 2003 2004 2005 In television 1999 2000 2001 2002 2003 2004 2005 In film 1999 2000 2001 2002 2003 2004 2005
- Art; Archaeology; Architecture; Literature; Music; Philosophy; Science; +...

The year 2002 in radio involved some significant events.

== Events ==
- January – The Glenn Beck Program launched on 47 stations on Premiere Radio Networks.
- January 21 – A train derailment in Minot, North Dakota kills one person and knocks out power throughout the region, spilling 250,000 gallons of toxic anhydrous ammonia for fertilizer purposes. The designated primary station for the EAS in Minot, Clear Channel-owned KCJB 910-AM, fails to air any disaster information. The EAS had to be activated by local law enforcement; Minot police were unable to do so, and KCJB couldn't due to being all-automated in the overnight hours. The incident gradually attracts controversy, as well as attacks on Clear Channel from future Minnesota senator Al Franken.
- March 11 – BBC 6 Music, the first new BBC music radio station in decades, is launched.
- May 29 - After 2 years with rhythmic oldies, KBTB/Seattle begins stunting on this day as "Quick 96." 2 days later, KBTB flips back to classic hits as KJR-FM.
- July 8 – KHBZ-FM in Oklahoma City shifts to Alternative Rock.
- November 4 - After 36 years in the country format, KIKK-FM/Houston flipped to smooth jazz as KHJZ, "95.7 The Wave."
- December 2 – radio2XS launches onLine from Sheffield
- "Dawson McKay & The Get Up Gang" becomes "The Get Up Gang with Dawson, Wendy, and Levi" as Dawson moves from KASH 107.5 in Anchorage, Alaska to Albuquerque New Mexico's 92.3 KRST.
- KDWN in Las Vegas, Nevada fires Doug Basham, despite receiving the highest ratings of any other host on the station including nationally syndicated ones, allegedly for spending "too much time bashing the president."
- CBS Radio fires Opie and Anthony of The Opie and Anthony Show from WNEW-FM, following the backlash of their Sex for Sam 3 promotion in New York City, NY.

== Debuts ==
- July 1 – Launch of Sirius Satellite Radio

== Closings ==
- Karl Haas retired from broadcasting at the age of 89, and recorded his last episode of Adventures in Good Music.
- August 27: CHUM Radio shuts down its "Team" syndicated sports network in Canada after a little over a year; their flagship station "1050 CHUM" in Toronto reverted to its famous oldies format with much fanfare, while the other "Team" stations reverted to their previous formats, with the exception of Ottawa's CFGO.

== Deaths ==
- January 21 - Peggy Lee, 81, American jazz and popular music singer, songwriter, composer and actress.
- February 15 - Howard K. Smith, 87, American radio journalist.
- February 27 - Spike Milligan, 83, English comedian and writer, writer/performer of The Goon Show.
- March 31 - Barry Took, 73, English comedy writer and broadcast presenter.
- April 26 - Del Sharbutt, 90, American radio and television announcer.
- June 7 - Wayne Cody, 65, radio and television sportscaster who spent the bulk of his career at KIRO in Seattle, Washington.
- June 18 - Jack Buck, 77, American sportscaster, best known for his work announcing Major League Baseball games of the St. Louis Cardinals.
- August 2 - Joe Allison, 77, American songwriter, radio and television personality, record producer and country music business executive.
- August 5 - Chick Hearn, 85, television and radio announcer for the Los Angeles Lakers basketball team since 1960.
- September 23 - Vernon Corea, 75, international broadcaster.
- November 17 - Wolf Mittler, 84, German broadcaster.
- November 27 - Stanley Black, 89, English pianist, bandleader, composer, conductor and arranger.

== See also ==
- Radio broadcasting
