= 2003 in radio =

The year 2003 in radio involved some significant events.

== Events ==
- October 10 – Facing an investigation surrounding allegations of illegal drug use, American right-wing radio host Rush Limbaugh publicly admits that he is addicted to prescription pain killers, and will seek treatment.

== Debuts ==
- March 3 – Skratch 'N Sniff debuts on San Diego area alternative rock station XETRA-FM (91.1 FM, "91X").
- March 31 – "NBC News Radio," an hourly service of one-minute news updates anchored by NBC News and MSNBC personnel (but written by Westwood One staffers) is launched. Westwood One still maintains production of the unrelated five-minute long "NBC Radio News"-branded newscasts in morning drive (which had been produced and anchored by CBS Radio personnel since 1998) for one more year; they were one of a few remaining connections to the original NBC Radio Network.
- April – KJOC in Davenport, Iowa dumps its all-sports format and switches to talk, hoping to compete with the market's WOC. Some sports programming – mainly, the Chicago Cubs and Iowa State University athletics – are held over, and (except for a few brief interim periods with ISU sports) remain to this day.
- June 20 - KOCZ-LP in Opelousas, Louisiana, begins broadcasting as the third community radio "barnraising" initiative of the Prometheus Radio Project.
- October 12 – Billboard unveils the Hot Dance Airplay chart. "Just The Way You Are" by Milky is the first number one single on the published chart. Original panel: WKTU/New York City, KDLD/Los Angeles, KKDL/Dallas-Fort Worth, WQSX/Boston, WPYM/Miami, KCJZ/San Antonio, KPTI/San Francisco and KNRJ/Phoenix. All stations have since left the Dance format and panel.

== Closings ==
- KMEO in Flower Mound, Texas ended their Memories format and began their Country format as KTYS.
- Art Bell semi-retires from Coast to Coast AM, remains hosting weekends

== Deaths ==
- January 17 - Richard Crenna, 77, American motion picture, television, and radio actor
- January 25 - Robert Rockwell, 82, American stage, film, radio and television actor
- March 17 - Alan Keith, 94, English actor and longtime classical music presenter
- July 4 - Larry Burkett, 64, American evangelical Christian author and radio personality
- August 27 - Jinx Falkenburg, 83, who (with her husband, Tex) popularized the talk-show format, first on radio and then in the early days of television
- October 27 - Rod Roddy, 66, American top-40 disc jockey and announcer, better known for his work announcing television game shows

== See also ==
- Radio broadcasting
