= 1999 in radio =

The year 1999 in radio involved some significant events.

== Events ==
- March 31 – Chilean radio station Radio Minería closes down.
- May 4 – Clear Channel Communications' official merger with Jacor is consummated.
- May 14 – US radio station WENZ/Cleveland flips from modern rock to mainstream urban as "Kiss 107.9."
- May 20 – US radio station WZLE/Lorain flips from Christian contemporary to Top 40/CHR as "KISS 104.9", targeting Greater Cleveland. WZLE owner Clear Channel subsequently filed a cease and desist order against WENZ claiming rights to the KISS-FM brand in Ohio; WENZ ultimately rebranded as "Z-107.9" on September 1.
- August 28 – US radio station WAKS/Tampa flips formats from Top 40/CHR to hot AC as "Mix 100.7"; the station assumes the WMTX calls, while the WAKS calls are transferred to the former WZLE/Lorain.
- October 4 – Clear Channel announces a nearly $23.5 billion merger with AMFM, creating America's largest radio group. The deal would close the following year after selling off surplus in multiple markets. This would be the largest broadcast deal in American history, a record that would stand until Clear Channel itself was bought out by private equity in 2007.
- September – The United Press International Radio Network closes down after 41 years.
- November 14 – Smoke Rings breaks the record for the longest-running Swedish radio programme, previously held by Barnens brevlåda.

== Debuts ==
- October 23 – The BJ Shea Morning Experience makes its debut on KQBZ in Seattle, Washington.

== Closings ==
- April 17 – The Mutual Broadcasting System name was retired by owner Westwood One, with remaining affiliates switching to CNN Radio in a deal with Turner Broadcasting. On that same day, "NBC Radio"-branded newscasts (by this point, "Mutual" and "NBC" newscasts were produced and anchored by CBS Radio personnel) were also limited only to 5 a.m. – 10 a.m. on weekday mornings, with CNN Radio newscasts airing at all other times.

== Deaths ==
- January 11 – Frank Parker, 95, American singer and television personality
- January 30 – Ed Herlihy, 89, American radio and television announcer for NBC
- April 16 – Regis Cordic, 72, American radio personality and actor
- May 9 – Shirley Dinsdale, 72, American ventriloquist and television and radio personality of the 1940s and early 1950s
- December 15 – George Elrick, 95 Scottish bandleader and DJ
- Laure Leprieur (Madame Leprieur d'Agon-Coutainville), c.80, French radio quiz-setter
- Ted Mallie, 74, American radio and television announcer

== See also ==
- Radio broadcasting
