= 1943 in radio =

The year 1943 saw a number of significant happenings in radio broadcasting history.

== Events ==
- 6 January: BBC reporter Richard Dimbleby makes a live recording from a Royal Air Force nighttime bombing raid on Berlin piloted by Guy Gibson.
- 15 January: Fernand Grenier broadcasts on Radio Londres offering Communist support for Free France.
- 2 May: Fireside chat by the President of the United States: On the Coal Crisis.
- 10 May: NBC, Inc. v. United States is decided, allowing the Federal Communications Commission broad power to regulate the operations of broadcast networks, which results in National Broadcasting Company being forced to sell off their secondary NBC Blue Network. Gradually, any and all references to "NBC" will be removed from all Blue Network programming or promotions, and "NBC Red" will become known just as NBC Radio.
- 13 May: In the Netherlands, an ordinance issued by the German occupiers requires the surrender to the authorities of all radio sets.
- 26 July: American propaganda broadcasters for the Axis powers Jane Anderson ("the Georgia Peach"), Robert Henry Best, Douglas Chandler, Edward Delaney, Constance Drexel, Fred W. Kaltenbach, Max Otto Koischwitz and poet Ezra Pound are indicted in absentia by a District of Columbia grand jury on charges of treason.
- 28 July: Fireside chat: On Progress of War and Plans for Peace.
- 8 September: Fireside chat: Opening Third War Loan Drive.
- 12 October: Edward Noble's American Broadcasting System offer to purchase the Blue Network and its O&Os from NBC gets approval from the FCC; Noble's lone station prior to the purchase, WMCA in New York, is sold off; the American Broadcasting Company (ABC) commences operations.
- Late October: Gustav Siegfried Eins, a British black propaganda station, ceases broadcasting to German troops in Western Europe on the short wave, ostensibly because of a Gestapo raid.
- 4 November: Abbott and Costello resume their NBC Radio programme after a six-month hiatus for health reasons, Lou Costello having battled a severe case of rheumatic fever. While rehearsing, Costello learns that his youngest son accidentally drowned in the family pool, just two days before his first birthday. The show goes on as scheduled, with no one in the audience having any knowledge of what has happened until the end, when Costello abruptly rushes from the stage in tears. Partner Bud Abbott delivers the tragic news live over the entire network to the shocked audience.
- 14 November: Soldatensender Calais, a British black propaganda station, begins broadcasting to German troops in Western Europe from a studio at Milton Bryan in Bedfordshire through the powerful medium wave Aspidistra transmitter in southern England, purporting to be an official German military station.
- 23 November: British Forces Broadcasting Service begins operation serving forces overseas.
- 3 December: Edward R. Murrow delivers his classic "Orchestrated Hell" broadcast over CBS describing a Royal Air Force nighttime bombing raid on Berlin.
- 24 December: Fireside chat: On Tehran and Cairo Conferences.

== Debuts ==
- 7 January: Meet Corliss Archer debuts on CBS.
- 10 January: The Better Half, a quiz show, debuts on Mutual.
- 11 January: A. L. Alexander's Mediation Board debuts on Mutual.
- 16 January: An American in Russia debuts on CBS.
- 15 February: My True Story debuts on NBC Blue/The Blue Network.
- 21 February: Free World Theatre debuts on NBC Blue/The Blue Network.
- 18 March: The Busy Mr. Bingle debuts on Mutual.
- 25 March: The Jimmy Durante and Garry Moore Show debuts on the NBC Red Network.
- 27 March: Blue Ribbon Town debuts on CBS Radio.
- 3 April: The Billie Burke Show airs on CBS Radio Saturday mornings until September 21, 1946.
- 10 April: The Falcon debuts on the Blue Network.
- 31 May: Archie Andrews debuts on the Blue Network.
- 2 June: The Jack Carson Show debuts on CBS.
- 4 June: Ladies Be Seated debuts on the Blue Network.
- 13 June: Calling America debuts on CBS.
- 22 June: Johnny Mercer's Music Shop debuts on NBC.
- 28 June: The Dreft Star Playhouse debuts on NBC Radio.
- 5 July:
  - The Adventures of Nero Wolfe debuts on the Blue Network.
  - The Black Hood debuts on Mutual.
  - Chick Carter, Boy Detective debuts on Mutual.
- 7 July: Flashgun Casey debuts on CBS. The program is later titled Casey, Press Photographer; Crime Photographer; and Casey, Crime Photographer.
- 8 July: Blind Date debuts on NBC.
- 8 July: The Sealtest Village Store debuts on NBC.
- 18 July: The Bob Crosby Show debuts on NBC.
- 19 July: Broadway Bandbox debuts on CBS.
- 24 July: Foreign Assignment debuts on Mutual.
- 2 August: American Women debuts on CBS.
- 8 August: America in the Air debuts on CBS.
- 12 September: Dunninger, The Mentalist debuts on the Blue Network.
- 13 September: Ed Sullivan Entertains debuts on CBS.
- 30 September: The Bird's Eye Open House debuts on CBS.
- 11 October: Brave Tomorrow debuts on NBC.
- 3 December: The Mysterious Traveler debuts on Mutual.
- 27 December: Broadway Showtime debuts on CBS.
- Undated:
  - The Black Castle debuts on Mutual.
  - Caribbean Voices debuts on the BBC World Service.
  - Salty Brine takes over as the host of the morning show-the "T.N.T. Review" on WPRO, a position he will hold until April 28, 1993.

== Closings ==
- 1 January: Don Winslow of the Navy ends its run on network radio (Blue Network).
- 8 January: Are You a Genius? ends its run on network radio (CBS).
- 30 January: An American in Russia ends its run on network radio (CBS).
- 28 February: Anchors Aweigh ends its run on network radio (Mutual).
- 23 April: In Person, Dinah Shore ends its run on network radio (Blue Network).
- 10 June: The Busy Mr. Bingle ends its run on network radio (Mutual).
- 4 July: Unlimited Horizons ends its run on network radio (NBC).
- 31 August: WRTD, Richmond, Virginia, ceases to exist as a result of the merger of the company owning it with the owner of WRNL, Richmond.
- 14 September: Johnny Mercer's Music Shop ends its run on network radio (NBC).
- 21 September: The Billie Burke Show ends its run on network radio CBS.
- 3 October: Calling America ends its run on network radio (CBS).
- 9 October: Chips Davis, Commando ends its run on network radio (CBS).
- 26 December: Songs by Sinatra ends its run on network radio (CBS).

== Births ==
- 29 January: Tony Blackburn, English radio disc jockey.
- 6 April: Roger Cook (died 2026), Australasian-born British investigative reporter.
- 6 May: Milton William Cooper (died 2001), American writer and shortwave broadcaster.
- 30 May: Charles Collingwood, Canadian-born actor.
- 31 July: William Bennett, American conservative pundit, politician and radio talk show host.
- 17 August: John Humphrys, Welsh-born news broadcaster.
- 23 August: Geoffrey Smith (died 2026), American jazz percussionist and radio presenter in the UK.
- 11 September: Brian Perkins, New Zealand-born radio newsreader.
- 28 September: Mike Dickin (died 2006), English radio disc jockey and presenter.
- 23 October: Roger Scott (died 1989), English radio disc jockey.
- 26 November: Paul Burnett, English radio disc jockey.
- 23 December: Harry Shearer, American voice artist, actor and radio presenter.
- 27 December: Cokie Roberts (died 2019), American broadcast political journalist.
- Jaye Michael Davis (died 2006), American radio disc jockey and voice of Memphis's WDIA starting in 1977.

== Deaths ==
- 23 October: Ben Bernie, 52, American jazz violinist and radio personality.
