= Donald S. Day =

American reporter

Donald Satterlee Day
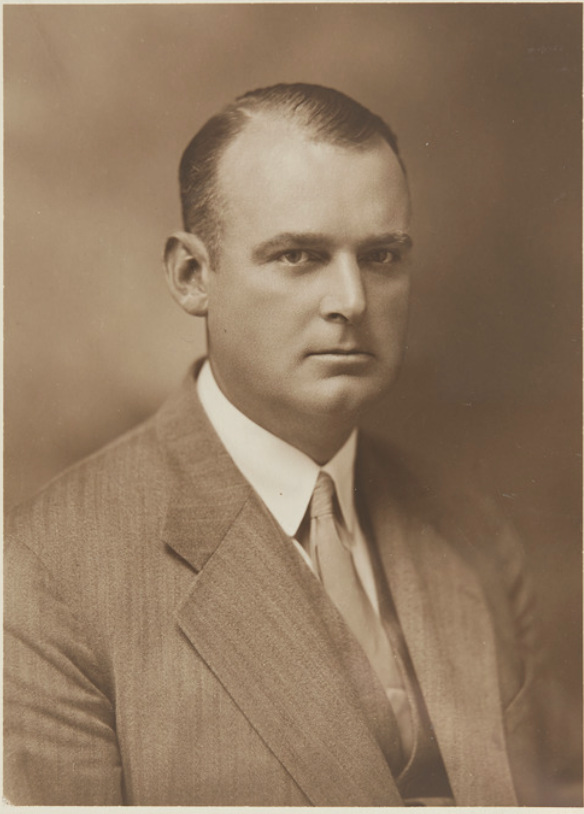
- Born: May 15, 1895; Brooklyn, New York, U.S.
- Died: October 1, 1966 (aged 71); Helsinki, Finland
- Occupations: Journalist, propagandist
- Relatives: Dorothy Day (sister)

Donald Satterlee Day (May 15, 1895 – October 1, 1966) was an American reporter in northern Europe for the Chicago Tribune in the 1920s and 1930s. As a broadcaster on German radio for several months during World War II, he argued that the United States should support Nazi Germany in its war against the Soviet Union. Following the Allied victory in Europe, he was twice arrested by U.S. authorities and investigated for treason, but no charges were brought. Due to his position in eastern Europe as a reporter for many years, Day was able to provide the U.S. government with tips about Soviet espionage agents. This played a part in the case against him being dropped.

== Early life and family ==
Donald Day was born in Brooklyn, New York, on May 15, 1895, to John I. and Grace Bryant (née Satterlee) Day. He had two brothers, Samuel Houston Day and John I. Day II, and two sisters, Grace Delafield Day and Dorothy Day, who was a noted Catholic social activist and has been considered for canonization by the Catholic Church since 1983. He followed his father, who was editor of the New York Morning Telegraph, into journalism, and worked for The Day Book, a tabloid newspaper aimed at the working-class market which campaigned on behalf of labor unions and the right of women to vote.

On August 13, 1917, Day enlisted in the United States naval aviation and was honorably discharged at the end of World War I. Upon completion of his military service, he returned to New York and worked as a sports reporter for The Morning Telegraph and worked for a time for the New York World.

== Reporter in Europe ==
In 1921, Day was invited by the unofficial Soviet representative in New York, Ludwig Martens, to accompany him on his deportation from the U.S. to the Soviet Union and to report on events there. When he arrived in Riga, Latvia, he received a Soviet visa and an offer from the European Director of the Chicago Tribune, Floyd Gibbons, to be that newspaper's Northern Europe Correspondent. Day accepted the offer and from August 1921 was the only U.S. reporter in the region. He reported on events in the Baltic States, Finland, and the Soviet Union. His visa for the Soviet Union was revoked when he refused to report on the Soviet system in a consistently favorable light. He was unable to comply when faced by his experience of Soviet rule and the Communist seizure of Estonia, Latvia, and Lithuania. When he was denied direct access to the Soviet Union, he relied on reports from refugees and correspondents he sent across the border.

His experiences made him a committed anti-Communist, which was reflected in his reports, especially those on the forced collectivization of agriculture in the 1920s and the Soviet famine of 1932–1933. Day's uncompromising reports on the Soviet Union were almost unique at the time, completely unlike those of other Western reporters like Walter Duranty, the Moscow Bureau Chief of The New York Times from 1922 to 1936. Three months before the United States presidential election of 1936, the Tribune headlined one of his stories, "Moscow orders Reds in U.S. to back Roosevelt". The rival Chicago Times offered $5,000 for proof that the story was true. However, the reward was never collected.

In March 1939, Polish authorities barred Day from verifying reports of the persecution of the country's ethnic German minority, as he was sympathetic to the German position. Day was a war correspondent in the Winter War. When the Soviets invaded Latvia on June 17, 1940, he was given 24 hours to leave the country. He claimed while in Riga that the invasion was facilitated only by the Russian and Jewish minorities in the country: "On June 17 there was a mob at the railway station, waving red rags and screaming in hysterical joy about the arrival of the Russians. The Latvian language could not be heard. The speeches, the shouts, the screams were all in Russian or Yiddish."

Following the annexation of the Baltic States by the Soviets, Day relocated to Sweden to continue reporting as the Tribune's Stockholm correspondent. In 1941, Day accompanied Finnish troops as they advanced into Soviet territory and in September 1942 he quit his post to join the Finnish Army. The Tribune demanded he return immediately, and Day decided to stay and fight with the Finns. However, the Finns soon rejected his enlistment on account of pressure from the U.S. government. His passport had expired and had not been renewed, so Day then found himself both unemployed and unable to travel freely.

== Propaganda for Nazi Germany ==
As hostilities between Finland and the Soviet Union were drawing to a close, Day was convinced that the West had to be warned of Communist expansion into Eastern Europe behind the advancing Red Army. He relocated in the summer of 1944 to Nazi Germany and became employed in Berlin as a commentator for the German State Radio (RRG). Day was the last U.S. citizen recruited for the RRG's USA Zone. On August 31, 1944, Day began broadcasting from Berlin to U.S. forces in Europe and continued his broadcasts until April 18, 1945. He was convinced that the Third Reich was the West's only bulwark against Soviet tyranny. His broadcasts denounced President Franklin D. Roosevelt and the United States' alliance with the USSR, and he blamed Jews for Soviet atheistic Communism. Day stated his position as: "I also feel that in fighting the Jewish-Bolshevik regime of Russia that Germany is performing a service for Western civilization which will be properly appreciated and recognized in the future."

Day was included on the Nazi list of those to be detained in 1940 following a successful invasion of Great Britain and a Nazi victory in Europe. He was paid $3,000 a month as a broadcaster, putting him among the six highest paid employees on the RRG's payroll.

== Arrest and charges of treason ==
Day was arrested by U.S. occupation forces in Germany in May 1945 and detained, along with Mildred Gillars and Herbert John Burgman, by the Army Counterintelligence Corps at Camp King, Oberursel, until he was conditionally released on December 24, 1946.

Day returned home to his wife Edit in Bad Tölz, Bavaria.

He was rearrested pending treason charges on January 12, 1949, but the U.S. Department of Justice (DOJ) dropped the case soon after, due to other agencies seeking to get Day's help to identify potential Soviet espionage agents who had entered the United States. As a DOJ memorandum of December 6, 1946, had noted: "Donald Day was a broadcaster for the Germans during the last eight or nine months of the war. His broadcasts consisted primarily of extremely anti-Russian statements. He made broadcasts both to the United States and to American troops." A memorandum dated January 22, 1947, said that he "sometimes suggested that the United States should not have entered the war and that Germany's cause against Russia was just."

== Later life ==
On his release, Day returned to Finland with his wife Edit, whom he had married in Riga in 1940. He was reporting for the Tribune as its Baltic correspondent in late 1962 and was still filing stories for that newspaper in September 1966. He died of a heart attack in Helsinki on October 1, 1966.

== Publications ==
Various titles and editions:

- Donald Day, Onward Christian Soldiers: Suppressed Reports of a 20-year Chicago Tribune Correspondent in Eastern Europe from 1921, Torrance, CA: Noontide Press, 1982
- Donald Day, Onward Christian Soldiers: An American Journalist's Dissident Look at World War II, Torrance, CA: Noontide Press, 2002

== See also ==
- Jane Anderson (journalist)
- Robert Henry Best
- Douglas Chandler
- Edward Leo Delaney
