= Edward Leo Delaney =

- Born: December 12, 1885; Olney, Illinois, U.S.
- Died: July 1, 1972 (aged 86); Glendale, California, U.S.

Edward Leopold Delaney (December 12, 1885 – July 1, 1972) was an American broadcaster of Nazi propaganda during World War II. He was indicted for treason in 1943, but the charges were dropped after the war due to a lack of evidence.

== Early life ==
Delaney was born in Olney, Illinois.

Delaney began an acting career about 1910, playing the part of Blackie Daw in one of Cohan and Harris's road companies' productions of Get-Rich-Quick Wallingford. Delaney left the troupe in 1915 for Australia, where he played the part of the Killer in Seven Keys to Baldpate in Josephine Cohan's company.

In the early 1920s, Delaney returned to the United States as a theatrical tour manager and in 1934 he published his first book, The Lady By Degrees, followed in 1935 by The Charm Girl.

From 1935 to 1939, Delaney was employed by the Transoceanic Film Export Company of New York City, traveling to various European countries.

In 1937 and 1938 Delaney went to Germany to write, returning to the U.S. in early 1939. In December 1939 he left the U.S. for Italy. Then through his contacts from his involvement with the ultra-right and Coughlinite politics, he was recruited by the Reichs-Rundfunk-Gesellschaft (RRG) to present a series of pro-German broadcasts from an American perspective for its U.S.A. Zone.

== Propaganda for Nazi Germany ==
In January 1940, Delaney began as a commentator for the RRG, German State Radio in Berlin. Using the pseudonym "E. D. Ward", Delaney confined his broadcasts almost entirely to news favorable to Germany and the Axis. Described as a "roving reporter", he denounced the British class system.

Delaney claimed never to have formally promoted Nazi doctrine and he is not believed to have made any propaganda broadcasts after U.S. entry into the war on December 11, 1941. Those that were subsequently aired appear to have been recorded earlier. Constant friction with his supervisors at the RRG and interrogation by the Gestapo as to his motives and commitment led to his departure from Berlin in 1943.

== Arrest ==
After his dismissal from the RRG, Delaney avoided internment and lived in Germany and Czechoslovakia in Occupied Europe for two years. He was eventually arrested in Prague on May 20, 1945 after he disclosed his wartime activities to two Stars and Stripes reporters, Howard Byrne and Klaus Mann. He was arrested by the Czechoslovak police and subsequently taken into the custody of the Counter Intelligence Corps at Freising in Bavaria. He was returned to the U.S. from Bremerhaven on board the U.S. Army transport, the USAT George W. Goethals and arrested on arrival in New York by the FBI on August 8, 1947. The following day he was held on $10,000 bail for grand jury action.

== Charges of treason ==
On July 26, 1943, Delaney, along with Fred W. Kaltenbach, Douglas Chandler, Jane Anderson, Constance Drexel, Robert Henry Best, Max Otto Koischwitz and Ezra Pound was indicted in absentia by a District of Columbia grand jury on charges of treason.

Delaney was returned to the U.S. on August 8, 1947, but the charges against him were dropped by the Department of Justice due to lack of evidence on October 27, 1947. A United States Government memorandum held by the DOJ dated June 14, 1946, had stated the following:

Although he may be classified as a political commentator and although he was indicted for treason in 1943, it does not appear worthwhile to continue our efforts to develop information as to his activities in view of the very few wartime recordings made by him.

== Later life ==
Delaney spent a number of years touring the U.S. as an ultra-conservative lecturer and finally settled down in Southern California, where he spent the rest of his life as a political author and small-town newspaper columnist. His publications include False Freedom 1954, which published through Sequoia University Press, Freedom's Frontier 1964, and Harvest of Deceit 1971. He published his autobiography, Five Decades Before Dawn in 1969.

Delaney died in an automobile accident in California in 1972.

== See also ==
- Jane Anderson
- Robert Henry Best
- Herbert John Burgman
- Douglas Chandler
- Donald S. Day
- Mildred Gillars
