= Herbert John Burgman =

American broadcaster (1894–1953)

- Born: April 17, 1894; Hokah, Minnesota, U.S.
- Died: December 16, 1953 (aged 59); MCFP Springfield, Springfield, Missouri, U.S.
- Status: Deceased
- Conviction: Treason (13 counts)
- Penalty: 6 to 20 years imprisonment

Herbert John Burgman (April 17, 1894 – December 16, 1953) was an American broadcaster of Nazi propaganda during World War II. He was convicted of treason in 1949 and sentenced to six to 20 years in prison. Burgman died in prison in 1953.

== Biography ==
Herbert John Burgman was born in Hokah, Minnesota, the son of Gustave and Karoline (née Dahlke) Burgman. He served with the U.S. Army from 1918 to 1920. Burgman was posted to Germany and served in the American zone in the Occupation of the Rhineland. In 1921, he joined the State Department in Berlin and worked as a clerk and economic statistician in the U.S. embassy to Germany.

Burgman married a German national, Johanna Karhl, in 1924. Their son was born in 1925. By 1941, he was a committed Nazi sympathizer and when Germany declared war on America on December 11, 1941, he chose to remain in Germany rather than return to the U.S. with the repatriation of the embassy staff.

== Propaganda for Nazi Germany ==
During World War II, he was a broadcaster for "Radio Debunk", the Voice of All Free America under the pseudonym of Joe Scanlon. In his broadcasts, Burgman attempted to persuade American listeners that prostitution and sexually transmitted diseases were widespread in the U.S. Army stationed overseas and that Britain and the Soviet Union were in collusion against the United States. He blamed Franklin D. Roosevelt and "his Jewish and Communistic pals" for the war.

== Arrest ==
Burgman was arrested by American soldiers at his home in Rumpenheim, Frankfurt in November 1945. He was held in detention along with Mildred Gillars and Donald S. Day by the Counterintelligence Corps at Camp King, Oberursel, until his conditional release on December 24, 1946. He was required to report regularly to U.S. Military Police who then employed him as an interpreter even though he had been assessed as mentally incompetent by U.S. Army psychiatrists.

Burgman was rearrested on the instructions of the Justice Department on November 22, 1948, and returned to military custody in Frankfurt. He was returned to the United States on February 4, 1949, to face trial for treason.

== Trial ==
On April 1, 1949, Burgman was arraigned on 69 counts of treason at the Washington U.S. District Court. On May 9, 1949, Judge Henry A. Schweinhaut ordered that a new mental examination should be made. This time, he was assessed as mentally competent and his trial began on October 11, 1949, with the original 69 counts of treason being reduced to 20. The prosecution relied on the many broadcasts featuring Burgman recorded by the Federal Communications Commission stationed in Silver Hill, Maryland to show his active participation in propaganda activities against the United States and eyewitness evidence of him broadcasting for the enemy. He admitted broadcasting wartime propaganda for the Germans, but his defense contended that he was insane when doing so. It was also argued that he had made his broadcasts in fear of the Gestapo. Burgman suffered a heart attack during his trial and appeared in a wheelchair at some of the proceedings. He was convicted of 13 acts of treason on November 15, 1949.

A motion for a new trial was denied on December 15, 1949, and five days later, on December 20, 1949, Judge Alexander Holtzoff sentenced Burgman to imprisonment for 6 to 20 years.

On February 8, 1951, the use of electrical transcriptions of his wartime broadcasts in his treason trial was upheld by the U.S. Court of Appeals.

== Death ==
Burgman served his prison sentence at the federal prison in Lewisburg, Pennsylvania. His health deteriorated, and on May 12, 1952, he was transferred to the U.S. Medical Center for Federal Prisoners in Springfield, Missouri, where he died from acute pulmonary edema due to heart disease on December 16, 1953, at the age of 59.

Burgman died on the first anniversary of the death of fellow Nazi propagandist Robert Henry Best, who had died in the same prison. Burgman is interred in the Oakwood Cemetery in Austin, Minnesota.

== See also ==
- Jane Anderson (journalist)
- Douglas Chandler
- Donald S. Day
- Edward Leo Delaney
