= Jane Anderson (journalist) =

American-Spanish war correspondent (1888–1972)

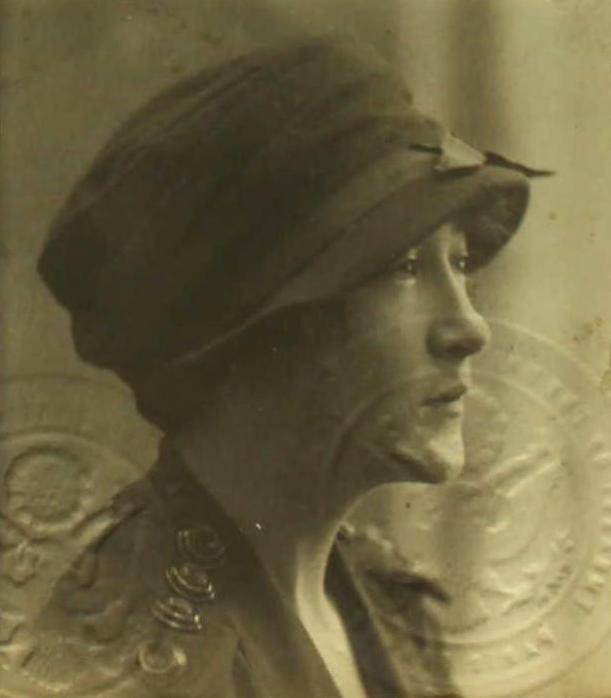
- Anderson's passport photo in 1917
- Born: Foster Anderson; January 6, 1888; Atlanta, Georgia, U.S.
- Died: May 5, 1972 (aged 84); Madrid, Spain
- Other names: Doña Juanita, "Georgia Peach"
- Occupations: Journalist, writer
- Years active: 1910–1945
- Criminal charge: Treason (in absentia), July 26, 1943
- Criminal penalty: Charges dropped, 1947
- Spouses: Deems Taylor (m. 1910–1918) Eduardo Alvarez de Cienfuegos (m. 1934)

Jane Anderson (January 6, 1888 – May 5, 1972) was an American-Spanish war reporter journalist who broadcast Nazi propaganda in Germany during World War II. She was indicted on charges of treason in 1943, but charges were dropped after the war for lack of evidence.

== Early life and career ==
Born Foster Anderson, her father, Robert M. "Red" Anderson was a close friend of the showman Buffalo Bill. Her mother, Ellen Luckie Anderson, came from a wealthy and prominent Atlanta family.

She lived with her grandparents in the small town of Demorest, Georgia, and attended Piedmont Academy until she was expelled in 1904. She then attended Kidd-Key Women's School, a finishing school in Dallas. She moved to New York City in 1909, where she lived until 1915. There she married Deems Taylor, the composer, in 1910. The marriage ended in divorce in 1918. While in New York, she became a successful writer of short stories, which were published in national magazines from 1910 to 1913.

She then traveled to Europe in September 1915 where she remained until 1918, writing articles and reports for the London Daily Mail. As a war correspondent, she suffered shell shock from a visit to the British trenches in France in 1916.

She was a lover of the novelist Joseph Conrad, who used her as the model for his heroine, Doña Rita, in The Arrow of Gold in 1919. In 1922, she returned to Europe as a correspondent for the International News Service and Hearst Newspapers.

In October 1934, she married a Spanish nobleman in Seville, Count Eduardo Alvarez de Cienfuegos, and settled with him in Spain.

== Franco supporter ==
The Spanish Civil War (1936–1939) broke out on July 18, 1936, and Anderson covered the struggle for the London Daily Mail, reporting from the Nationalist side. On September 13, 1936, she was captured and imprisoned by the Republican side, held as a fascist spy, and tortured. However, in October 1936, Anderson's release was secured by the intervention of U.S. Secretary of State Cordell Hull and the U.S. State Department assisted her return to the United States. Her experiences in Spain moved her political allegiance to the far right. She wrote and lectured on the Spanish Civil War to promote the cause of Francisco Franco, who eventually won the war with German and Italian military assistance.

She returned to Spain in 1938, worked for the Falangist Spanish Ministry of Propaganda, and came to the attention of the Reichs-Rundfunk-Gesellschaft, the German state radio, which offered her a post in Berlin in 1940.

== Propaganda for Nazi Germany ==
Anderson began broadcasts from Berlin on April 14, 1941, and when Germany declared war on the United States on December 11, American citizens were repatriated from Germany although Anderson chose to stay there.

Until March 6, 1942, she broadcast Nazi propaganda via short wave radio for the German State Radio's U.S. Zone, the Germans giving her the name "The Georgia Peach." Her radio program was broadcast two or four times weekly and each broadcast began and ended with the slogan "Always remember progressive Americans eat Kellog Corn Flakes and listen to both sides of the story" while a band played Scatterbrain. In her programs, she heaped praise on Adolf Hitler and ran "exposés" of the "communist domination" of the Roosevelt and Churchill governments. She specialized in interviews, one being with her co-worker, the British traitor William Joyce.

She was removed from her position as a commentator after material in her March 6, 1942, broadcast was successfully used by U.S. counterpropaganda when she revealed elite Germans were still dining in luxury despite widespread food insecurity in Germany. She then appears to have been inactive until her return to her propaganda work in 1944, when she made a few broadcasts reporting the brutality of the Red Army on the Eastern Front.

== Arrest ==
When Germany surrendered in May 1945, Anderson hid out in various locations in Germany and Austria. Finally, on April 2, 1947, she was arrested in Salzburg, Austria, and placed in U.S. military custody.

== Charges of treason ==
On July 26, 1943, Anderson was indicted in absentia by a District of Columbia grand jury on charges of treason, along with Fred W. Kaltenbach, Douglas Chandler, Edward Delaney, Constance Drexel, Robert Henry Best, Max Otto Koischwitz and Ezra Pound.

On October 27, 1947, however, the US Department of Justice dropped all charges for lack of evidence. From a United States Government Office memorandum dated June 14, 1946:

It is true that she could be classified as a political commentator, although not a very effective one, but as she apparently stopped her broadcasting activities shortly after our entry into the war it does not appear worthwhile that further efforts be made to develop our case against her, notwithstanding the fact that she was indicted for treason in 1943.

A further factor was that Anderson had been a Spanish citizen by marriage since 1934.

== Later life ==
Anderson was released from custody in Salzburg in early December 1947. She then went to live with her husband at Almoharín in postwar Francoist Spain. In the early 1960s, they moved to Cáceres, where she gave private lessons in English and German. After her husband's death, she moved to Madrid where she died in 1972.

== See also ==
- Herbert John Burgman
- Donald S. Day
- Mildred Gillars
