= Frederick Wilhelm Kaltenbach =

American Nazi propagandist

- Born: March 29, 1895; Dubuque, Iowa, U.S.
- Died: c. October 1945 (aged 50); Weimar, Germany
- Education: Grinnell College; Iowa State Teachers College; University of Chicago
- Occupations: Teacher, propagandist
- Status: Deceased
- Criminal charges: Treason (in absentia), July 26, 1943
- Penalty: Indictment dismissed, April 13, 1948

Frederick Wilhelm Kaltenbach (March 29, 1895 – c. October 1945) was an American who broadcast Nazi propaganda from Germany during World War II.

== Early life ==
Kaltenbach was born in Dubuque, Iowa, and was raised in Waterloo, Iowa. His father was John Kaltenbach, who had emigrated to the United States from Germany in 1891 and was naturalized in 1896.

After graduating from East High School, Waterloo, Kaltenbach and his brother Gustav went on a cycling tour of Germany and were there when World War I broke out in August 1914. They were detained on suspicion of espionage until December 1914, when they were released. Despite that experience, Kaltenbach became an admirer of Germany and its people.

On his return Kaltenbach enrolled in Grinnell College in Grinnell, Iowa, and studied there for three years. In June 1918, he was commissioned as a second lieutenant in the Coastal Artillery. Kaltenbach was honorably discharged from the US Army in April 1919.

He resumed his education at Iowa State Teachers College, earning a bachelor's degree in 1920. Kaltenbach worked for the next seven years as an appraiser before becoming a teacher. His first teaching post was in Manchester, Iowa. In 1931 he was offered a position at Dubuque's Senior High School teaching business law, economics, and debate. In the early 1930s he earned a master's degree in history from the University of Chicago.

== Introduction to Nazism ==
In 1933, Kaltenbach won a scholarship at the University of Berlin and took a two-year leave of absence from his employment to pursue his doctorate. While in Germany he became an ardent follower of the Nazi movement.

On his return to the United States, Kaltenbach resumed teaching in Dubuque. In 1935 he started a club for boys based on the Hitler Youth movement, the Militant Order of Spartan Knights. It held secret initiation rituals and the boys wore brown military-style uniforms. Because of the concern of parents, Kaltenbach's teaching contract was terminated in June 1936.

Kaltenbach then left for Germany where he worked as a freelance writer and translator and on occasion for the Reichs-Rundfunk-Gesellschaft, German State Radio.

In February 1939 he married a German national, Dorothea Peters, and they honeymooned in the United States. There he took every opportunity to speak in favor of the Nazi cause, but, after a hostile confrontation at a lecture he gave at the Russell-Lamson Hotel in Waterloo in May 1939, he hastily returned to Germany. He was soon hired as a broadcaster for Nazi propaganda.

== Lord Hee-Haw: propagandist for Nazi Germany ==
Back in Germany, Kaltenbach became a full-time broadcaster reading news bulletins for the RRG's USA Zone. From 1940 to 1941 he broadcast Letters to Iowa to the United States directed at the American Midwest. His programs consisted of anti-Roosevelt, anti-British and pro-isolationism propaganda in the form of fictional letters back home. Kaltenbach believed that his role was also to warn Americans of the dangers of Bolshevism and saw himself as one who could clarify the Nazi philosophy while minimizing criticism of Hitler.

He cultivated a simple and homey style and was one of several English-speaking propagandists for Germany that were referred to by the nickname Lord Hee-Haw, analogous to the British-directed propagandists who were dubbed Lord Haw-Haw. Kaltenbach opened each program with "Greetings to my old friend, Harry in Iowa", and delivered his propaganda messages in the form of advice, such as, "Don't let the British drag America into this thing [the war in Europe], Harry." After the United States entered the war against Germany on December 11, 1941, Kaltenbach's broadcasts aimed at undermining US morale and the national will to prosecute a protracted war with Germany.

Kaltenbach also broadcast with another American collaborator, Max Koischwitz, as Jim of Jim and Johnny, a humorous dialogue program in which the title characters traded propaganda-laden wisecracks.

== Charges of treason ==
On July 26, 1943, Kaltenbach, along with Max Otto Koischwitz, Jane Anderson ("The Georgia Peach"), Edward Delaney, Constance Drexel, Robert Henry Best, Douglas Chandler and Ezra Pound, was indicted by a District of Columbia grand jury on charges of treason.

== Disillusionment with Nazism ==
In the months following Kaltenbach's US indictment for treason in 1943, the frequency of his radio broadcasts diminished and his position as the leading American broadcaster was taken by two collaborators, Mildred Gillars and Douglas Chandler.

From 1944, Kaltenbach's health declined as he began to suffer from heart problems and asthma. He also became disenchanted with Hitler and Nazism, often refusing to broadcast and going on strike, sometimes for months at a time. This alienated his fellow American collaborators and resulted in confrontation, especially with their British colleague, William Joyce, on whom the Lord Haw-Haw nickname had finally settled.

Towards the end of the war, Kaltenbach attempted to ingratiate himself with anti-Nazi elements and religious elements associated with Pastor Martin Niemöller.

He could still be heard intermittently in North America and by American forces in Europe up to early 1945.

== Capture and death ==
After Germany surrendered on May 8, 1945, his wife reported to the US Army that her husband had been arrested at the family home in Berlin by Soviet troops on May 15, 1945. The Soviets refused American requests to surrender custody and later reported that Kaltenbach had died in Soviet Special Camp 2 in Buchenwald at an unspecified date in October 1945. The State Department agreed and the US District Court dismissed the indictment against Kaltenbach on April 13, 1948.
