= Max Otto Koischwitz =

Nazi propagandist

Max Oscar Otto Koischwitz (February 19, 1902 – August 31, 1944) was a German-American who directed and broadcast Nazi propaganda against the United States during World War II.

== Early life ==
Koischwitz was the son of a prominent physician, born into a family with a history of military service to Prussia and Germany. In 1920, he completed his secondary education at one of the most famous Gymnasia in Berlin, the Collège français de Berlin, and graduated from the University of Berlin in 1924. He immigrated to the United States that year.

He then taught German at Columbia University and became a professor of German Literature at Hunter College, New York City. Initially he took an anti-Nazi view of developments in Germany but as the 1930s progressed, he came to support Hitler and Nazism openly.

However, Koischwitz took U.S. citizenship at Long Island City on March 29, 1935.

In the fall of 1939, Koischwitz was required by Hunter College to take leave of absence after he had put antisemitic material into his lectures. He immediately made plans to return to Germany and resigned his position in January 1940.

== Propaganda for Nazi Germany ==
By spring 1940, Koischwitz was working as a program director in the U.S.A. Zone at the Reichs-Rundfunk-Gesellschaft, German State Radio. He broadcast talks to the U.S. under the pseudonyms of ‘Mister O.K.’ and ‘Doctor Anders’. His propaganda was directed to college students and German-American listeners who might be susceptible to Nazism. He spoke on literature, music, drama, philosophy and geopolitics, his broadcasts being antisemitic, anti-British, anti-Roosevelt, Sinophobic, and anti-communist in tone.

In Berlin, Koischwitz began a relationship with another American working for German state radio, Mildred Gillars, who would become widely known as ‘Axis Sally’. Koischwitz and Gillars became lovers and before long Koischwitz was working her into his political broadcasts. Together they formed a powerful propaganda duo. They began a joint series, the Home Sweet Home Hour, aimed at the Allied forces in North Africa.

Koischwitz also edited a magazine for American POWs, The Overseas Kid, and in September 1943 he was made head of the USA Zone. From October 1943 he and Gillars toured POW camps in Germany, interviewing captured Americans and recording their messages for their families in the US. The interviews were then edited for broadcast as though the speakers were well-treated or sympathetic to the Nazi cause. After D-Day, June 6, 1944, US soldiers wounded and captured in France were also reported on. Koischwitz and Gillars worked for a time from Chartres and Paris for this purpose, visiting hospitals and interviewing POWs.

Koischwitz also wrote and produced propaganda sketches and plays with Gillars in the lead, the most notorious of which was the Vision Of Invasion broadcast on May 11, 1944, a few weeks before the D-Day invasion of Normandy, France.

Koischwitz broadcast for almost the entire war, towards its end appealing for the United States to join Germany in fighting the approaching Red Army.

== Charges of treason ==
On July 26, 1943, Koischwitz, along with Fred W. Kaltenbach, Jane Anderson, Edward Delaney, Constance Drexel, Robert Henry Best, Douglas Chandler and Ezra Pound, was indicted in absentia by a District of Columbia grand jury on charges of treason.

== Death ==
Koischwitz did not stand trial as he died of tuberculosis and heart failure at Berlin's Spandau Hospital on August 31, 1944. The treason charges against him were formally withdrawn by the Department of Justice due to lack of evidence on October 27, 1947.
