= Robert Spangler =

American murderer

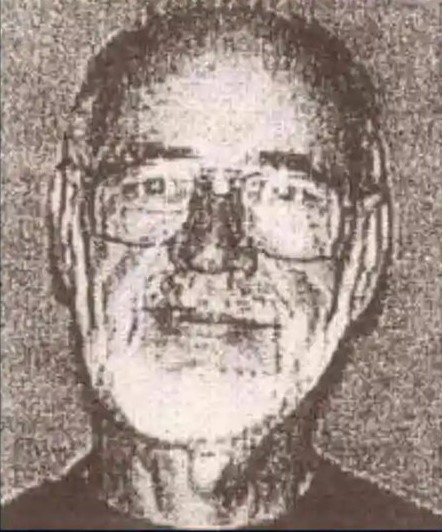
- An FBI photo of Spangler
- Born: January 10, 1933; Des Moines, Iowa, U.S.
- Died: August 5, 2001 (aged 68); MCFP Springfield, Springfield, Missouri, U.S.
- Status: Deceased
- Conviction: First degree murder
- Penalty: Life imprisonment

Details
- Victims: 4-5
- Span of crimes: 1978–1993
- Country: United States
- States: Colorado and Arizona
- Date apprehended: 2000
- Imprisoned at: MCFP Springfield

Robert Spangler (January 10, 1933 – August 5, 2001) was a serial killer who confessed to murdering his first and third wives and his two children. He was also suspected of murdering his second wife.

On the morning of December 30, 1978, in Arapahoe County, Colorado, Robert Spangler lured his wife, Nancy, into the basement with the promise of a "surprise" and shot her in the head with a revolver. Going upstairs, he shot his teenage children, Susan and David; David was slow in dying, so Spangler smothered him with a pillow. Spangler then altered the scene to make it appear that his wife had shot their children and then herself. On April 11, 1993, after Spangler's third marriage to 58-year-old aerobics instructor Donna Sundling went sour, he took her hiking in the Grand Canyon and pushed her off a 140-foot (40 m) drop to her death. On October 2, 1994, after reconnecting with ex-wife Sharon Cooper, she died of a drug overdose, from which Spangler inherited a life insurance policy; Sharon's was the only unnatural death in Spangler's married families he wasn't charged with.

== Life and career ==
Spangler was raised in Ames, Iowa, where a laboratory at Iowa State University is named after his father, a civil engineer. Spangler played football in high school where he met his first wife Nancy. They married in 1955 and moved to Littleton, Colorado. They had a son, David in 1961 and daughter, Susan in 1963.By 1978, he was working for the American Water Works company. Over the years, Spangler worked for Honeywell's camera and instruments division, served as public relations director for a non profit organization, and as a part-time disc jockey at a radio station. He also took part in Theatre Arts as an actor.

== Death of wives and children ==
On the morning of December 30, 1978, the bodies of Spangler's 45-year-old wife, and their 17-year-old son and 15-year-old daughter, were found in the Spangler home in Littleton, Colorado. All three had been shot with a .38-caliber handgun. The daughter, found partially clothed in her bed, had been shot in the back; the son, also in bed, had been shot in his chest; their mother was slumped over a typewriter in the basement with a bullet wound high on her forehead. A typewritten suicide note on the typewriter was signed with her initial.

Spangler, age 45, admitted that he and his wife had marital problems, that he planned to leave her, and that he was having an affair with a co-worker, Sharon Cooper. He said he left the house early in the morning and returned only after the bodies had been discovered; but his story changed significantly in a subsequent interview. Two separate, private polygraph examiners found his answers inconclusive to questions about any possible role in the deaths. The gun used in the shootings was Spangler's, and evidence of gunshot residue was found on his right palm. On January 3, 1979, the Arapahoe County coroner closed the case as a murder-suicide. The sheriff's office was unable to overcome the coroner's findings, and they had exhausted all investigative leads; therefore, they were forced to close the case. Most of the evidence was either returned to Spangler or destroyed. Seven months later, Spangler married Sharon Cooper and moved into the house where his family was killed. He and Sharon shared a common interest in hiking. She eventually wrote a book of her experiences hiking the Grand Canyon. Subsequently, the couple began to have marital problems. Sharon had told people that after Robert's father died that she began to believe that Robert was out to get her. They divorced in 1988.

In August 1990, Spangler married his third wife, Donna Sundling, and moved to Durango, Colorado. Donna was an active aerobics instructor with five grown children and numerous grandchildren from a previous marriage. Donna did not share Robert's love of hiking due to her fear of heights which soon led to marital problems. In April 1993, they backpacked in Grand Canyon hoping to save their marriage although Donna had been reluctant to make the trip.

On April 11, 1993, Spangler appeared at a ranger station in the Grand Canyon and calmly told the ranger that his wife had fallen to her death. He explained that they had stopped to take a picture on the trail and, when he looked back, his wife was gone. Rangers located Sundling's body approximately 160 feet (49 m) below the trail. The autopsy report concluded that she sustained massive injuries, including abrasions, contusions, lacerations, and multiple fractures of the neck, chest, and lower extremities. Spangler was never directly implicated in this wife's death because it was ruled an accident. He drew national attention with interviews on several television shows. As a grieving husband, Spangler discussed his wife's accidental death and the dangers of hiking in the Grand Canyon. Spangler continued to backpack the Canyon with a variety of partners several times a year.

After the death of his third wife, Spangler reestablished contact with his second wife, Sharon, who moved back into his Colorado home. On October 2, 1994, Robert found her in the house unresponsive next to a bottle of Tylenol. She died of a drug overdose later the same day. This death was not investigated by law enforcement. Spangler received a $20,000 payout from Sharon's insurance policy after she died.

== Investigation ==
In January 1999, investigators from the U.S. Department of Interior, National Park Service, and counties of Coconino, Arizona, and Arapahoe, Colorado, linked the cold case homicides in their respective jurisdictions. They met with agents from the FBI's Flagstaff, Arizona, resident agency and requested assistance. An assistant U.S. attorney (AUSA) from the District of Arizona with experience in capital murder cases, who had a personal knowledge of the Grand Canyon, joined the team. The AUSA united the cases under the umbrella of federal jurisdiction as an insurance fraud/murder, and an FBI agent in Flagstaff contacted the bureau's National Center for the Analysis of Violent Crime (NCAVC).

First, NCAVC officials suggested that investigators complete a subject history on Spangler, stressing that investigators should familiarize themselves with all available information. Further, they recommended using an NCAVC Behavioral Assessment Questionnaire when interviewing some of Spangler's associates. Early investigation revealed that Spangler was an educated, intelligent, and successful man. A charismatic individual, he worked in careers of human relations and public speaking. In addition, Spangler spent a significant amount of time living in different parts of Colorado and hiking the Grand Canyon. One lead set by the FBI agent resulted in an interview of a woman living in a small Colorado community who, subsequently, contacted authorities a few weeks after her interview. At that time, she gave them a copy of a letter she received from Spangler in which he advised her that he had terminal cancer.

The investigative team, with concurrence from the NCAVC, immediately approached Spangler. A complete confession was critical for prosecution because of the lack of existing evidence. The investigative team traveled to Colorado to interview Spangler, and the AUSA met them there to provide on-site legal consultation.

== Confession ==
In Colorado, local law enforcement and the local FBI office supported investigators. Because any prosecution depends on the admissibility of a confession, the investigative team agreed to videotape the entire interview. Spangler's terminal cancer created special issues for the AUSA regarding mental competence and the voluntarism of giving a statement. For this purpose, the NCAVC provided a telephonic interview strategy: a medical doctor retained by their unit analyzed Spangler's medical records, confirmed his terminal condition, and gave advice regarding competency issues.

Investigators approached Spangler at home and he agreed to an interview at the local sheriff's office. The FBI agent and the Arapahoe County detective initiated the actual interview with the AUSA monitoring it from another room. The agent from the National Park Service observed the initial interview and participated on the second day. The first day of interviewing lasted about 4 hours. Spangler believed investigators when they told him that FBI profilers wanted to study him because he was a unique killer.

Investigators confronted Spangler with the 1978 murders of his wife and children, the drug overdose of his second wife, and the murder of his third wife in the Grand Canyon. At the end of the interview, Spangler told investigators, "Well, you're naming one too many, remember." He left, agreeing to contact investigators in the morning if he wanted to continue the interview. Contrary to expectations of the investigation team, Spangler telephoned the FBI agent the next morning and made an appointment to continue the interview. Rapport was the key communication link between Spangler and the investigators, allowing the interview to continue despite an overnight break.

During the second interview, Spangler told investigators how, while married to his first wife, he fell in love with another woman, then shot his wife and two teenage children to be with her. Further, Spangler said he smothered his son with a pillow after shooting him because the bullet wound was not lethal. He strongly denied involvement in the overdose death of his second wife and refused to discuss the death in the Grand Canyon because he feared a civil lawsuit from his third wife's grown children.

Investigators encouraged Spangler to talk about the Grand Canyon murder by telling him that killing several people at one time did not make him a serial killer. This approach worked on Spangler; after a period of silence, he said, "You've got your serial." Spangler then described how he masterminded the Grand Canyon murder and pushed his third wife over the edge while she was facing him.

The NCAVC officials provided a behavioral analysis and interview strategy directly applied by investigators in the Spangler case. Further, they accurately predicted several of Spangler's behaviors. Spangler was concerned about his public reputation. He had been a radio talk show celebrity and was well respected in the community. After confessing, Spangler sent the FBI agent a letter, pleading with them to minimize the publicity about the case. In this letter, Spangler argued that he was not like other serial killers who target people for race or sexual orientation, correctly assessing that some serial killers target groups they perceive as undesirable. Spangler's motivation to kill centered around the anticipated gain of eliminating his wives and children. During the interview, he told investigators that killing them was easier than divorce. The results of this investigation included Spangler's confession to four homicides— three were 22-year-old cases. Spangler was tried in federal court for Donna Sundling's murder since it occurred on federal land.

Spangler, by then terminally ill with lung and brain cancer, pleaded guilty in federal district court in Arizona to first degree murder for killing his third wife, and he also admitted to the killing of his first wife and his two children. He was sentenced to life imprisonment without parole, and he died of cancer while he was incarcerated in federal prison, MCFP Springfield.

== In popular culture ==
- Crime Stories, Season 8, Episode 6, A Way with Murder (December 9, 2010)
- My Favorite Murder, Episode 235, Mr. Zip (August 13, 2020)
- Devil Among Us, Season 1 Episode 3, Trail of Blood (July 30, 2020)
- Monstruo, Season 2 Episode 8, The Husband (December 11, 2019)
- In Plain Sight, Season 2, Episode 7, Terrified to Death (May 31, 2019)
- The Widower, Season 2, Episode Episode 13, Park Predators Podcast (August 17, 2021)
- Spangler, Episode 1, FBI Profilers: Criminal Archives Podcast (July 7, 2024)
- « Le cas Robert Spangler » de Mc Skyz, Podcast HVF du 22 décembre 2025
