= Douglas Chandler =

American journalist and Nazi propagandist

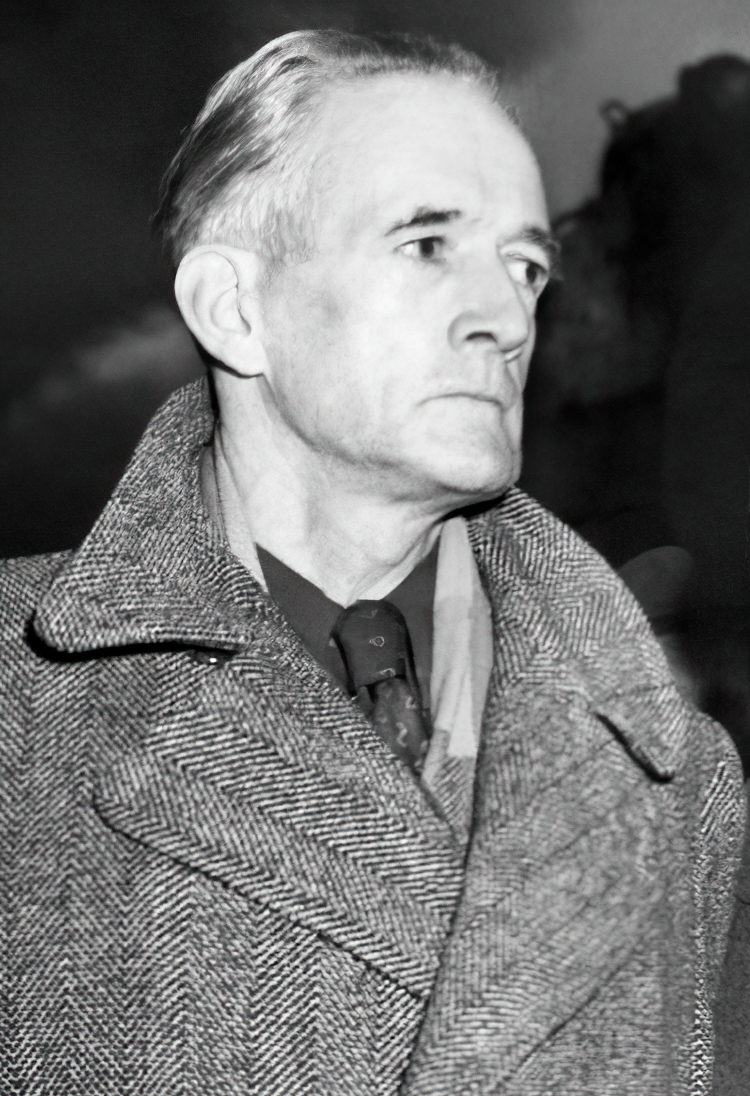
- Chandler during his trial (1947)
- Born: May 26, 1889; Chicago, Illinois, U.S.
- Died: Unknown; sometime after 1970
- Occupations: Radio broadcaster; journalist; propagandist
- Status: Deceased
- Conviction: Treason (10 counts)
- Penalty: Life imprisonment; conditionally commuted to time served
- Military career
- Allegiance: United States
- Branch: United States Navy
- Conflicts: World War I

Douglas Chandler (May 26, 1889 – after 1970s) was an American broadcaster of Nazi propaganda during World War II. He was convicted of treason and sentenced to life imprisonment in 1947 but was released in 1963.

== Early life ==
Born in Chicago, Illinois, Chandler was an officer in the United States Navy during the First World War and later wrote a weekly news column for a newspaper in Baltimore.

He was financially ruined in the Wall Street Crash of 1929 and "fed up to the chin with the Depression and the miasma that was enveloping Washington." He moved from the United States to France and then to Germany in 1931. Working there as a journalist, he showed Nazi Germany in an ideal light and contributed on that theme to the National Geographic Magazine.

== Propaganda for Nazi Germany ==
In April 1941, Chandler began to broadcast Nazi propaganda from Berlin for the Reichs-Rundfunk-Gesellschaft, German state radio, working as a commentator in its U.S.A. Zone. When Germany declared war on the United States on December 11, 1941, American citizens were repatriated by the U.S. government, but Chandler chose to stay.

Chandler broadcast to the United States under the pseudonym "Paul Revere." His programs began with the sound of clattering hooves and the song "Yankee Doodle" and were mainly anti-Roosevelt and anti-Semitic in content. He appealed to Americans to "throw off tyranny" and to their isolationist sentiment. He also asserted that Roosevelt was under the control of Jewish advisers.

Chandler became known as America's Lord Haw-Haw because of his cultivated American voice. Though he had become a convinced Nazi, his activities were not motivated by idealism alone. He was paid $3,200 a month as a broadcaster, which put him in the top six on the Reichs-Rundfunk-Gesellschaft’s payroll.

Towards the end of 1943, the increased Allied bombing of Berlin caused Chandler to be relocated first to Vienna and then to Munich, where he made his last broadcasts sometime in February 1945.

== Arrest ==
Chandler was taken into custody by the U.S. Army at his home in Durach, Bavaria, in May 1945, but he was released on October 23, 1945. He was then rearrested by the U.S. Army on or about March 12, 1946, at the request of the Department of Justice.

He was then flown to the United States to stand trial and arrived on December 14, 1946.

== Trial ==
On July 26, 1943, Chandler, along with Fred W. Kaltenbach, Jane Anderson, Edward Delaney, Constance Drexel, Robert Henry Best, Max Otto Koischwitz, and Ezra Pound, had been indicted in absentia by a District of Columbia grand jury on charges of treason.

Chandler stood trial at the Boston Federal District Court on June 6, 1947. He entered a defense of insanity because of paranoia and did not testify at his trial. The prosecution relied mainly on the evidence provided by recordings of Chandler's wartime broadcasts from Germany recorded by the Federal Communications Commission station at Silver Hill, Maryland, to show his active participation in propaganda activities against the United States.

Chandler was found guilty of all ten counts of treason on June 28, 1947. He was fined $10,000 and sentenced to life imprisonment by Federal Judge Francis Ford. On being convicted for treason, Chandler also automatically lost his U.S. citizenship. According to a contemporary newspaper, "Death by hanging had been demanded by Special Government Prosecutor Oscar R. Ewing who characterized the tall and gray-haired defendant as a black-hearted traitor who 'gave his heart and soul to Hitler' because he wanted Germany to win the war." Chandler's subsequent appeal was denied.

== Release ==
In 1963, Chandler's sentence was commuted by then U.S. President John F. Kennedy on the condition of leaving the United States, never to return. Chandler was released from the United States Penitentiary at Lewisburg, Pennsylvania, on August 9, 1963, and immediately returned to Germany. In 1970, Chandler wrote a letter to National Geographic editor Melville Bell Grosvenor, requesting reimbursement for expenses incurred on an assignment that had been canceled shortly after his Nazi sympathies were revealed. Later unverified witness reports placed him on the Canary Islands in the 1970s; however this cannot be confirmed. Inquiries to the Archivo Histórico Provincial de Santa Cruz de Tenerife in 2004 revealed that Chandler and his wife lived in La Orotava, a town on Tenerife. A Municipal Register of Residents for the year 1975 suggests his residency began in 1963, the year of his pardon and penitentiary release. The form was later amended to include the date of his death as June 20, 1977. He was not buried in the municipal cemetery according to the La Orotava Civil Registry.

== See also ==
- Jane Anderson (Nazi collaborator)
- Robert Henry Best
- Herbert John Burgman
- Donald S. Day
- Edward Leo Delaney
- Mildred Gillars
- Ezra Pound
- United States Penitentiary, Lewisburg
