= United States Medical Center for Federal Prisoners =

Federal hospital in Springfield, Missouri

Coordinates: 37.1776°N 93.3247°W

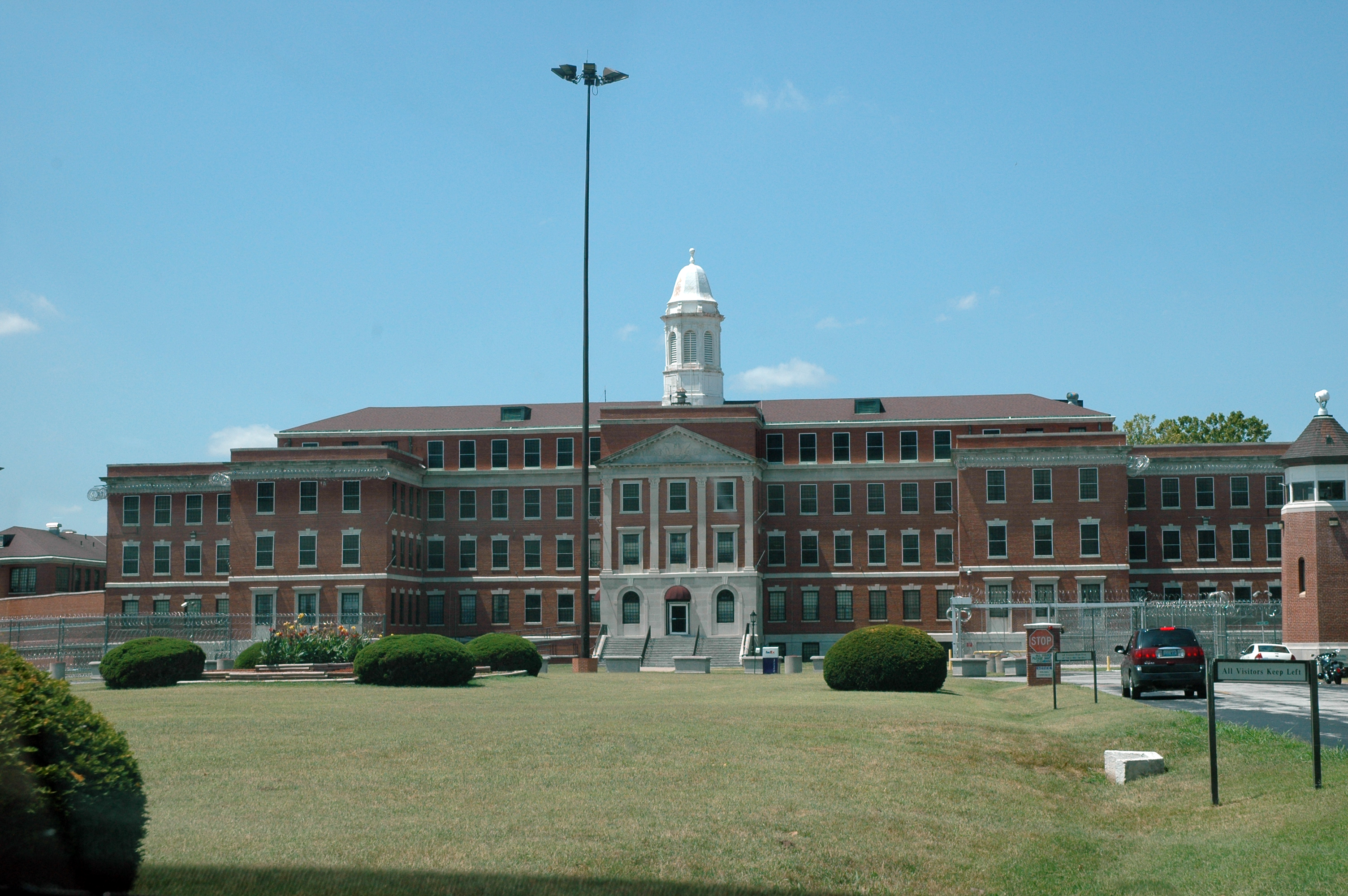
- Interactive map of United States Medical Center for Federal Prisoners
- Location: Springfield, Greene County, Missouri
- Status: Operational
- Security class: Administrative
- Population: 870
- Opened: 1933
- Managed by: Federal Bureau of Prisons
- Warden: Mark King
- Website: Official website

The United States Medical Center for Federal Prisoners (MCFP Springfield) is a United States federal prison in Springfield, Missouri, for male offenders. It is operated by the Federal Bureau of Prisons, a division of the United States Department of Justice.

== History ==
During the Great Depression, the city of Springfield, Missouri, offered 620 acres (250 ha) of land to the federal government to build the prison, under the direction of business leaser and Chamber of Commerce president John T. Woodruff. Congress authorized the building of the prison in 1930. The prison opened in 1933 as the "United States Hospital for Defective Delinquents", under superintendent Marion R. King. The land surrounding the prison was used by the prisoners for farming until 1966. In 1977, the federal government returned some of the original 620 acres to the city. Prison riots occurred in 1941, 1944 and 1959.

Several political prisoners and spies arrested during World War II were held at MCFP Springfield for medical treatment. Anastasy Vonsyatsky served 3 years of a 5-year sentence there for conspiring to aid Hitler's Germany in violation of the Espionage Act before being released in 1946. Robert Henry Best and Herbert John Burgman, who were sentenced to life in prison for treason in 1948 and 1949 for making propaganda broadcasts for the Nazis, served their sentences at this prison. Best died at MCFP Springfield in 1952, Burgman in 1953.

Several high-profile Mafia bosses received medical treatment at MCFP Springfield, including Joseph Bonanno of the Bonanno crime family, Vito Genovese and Vincent Gigante of the Genovese crime family and John Gotti of the Gambino crime family. Genovese died at MCFP Springfield in 1969, Gotti in 2002, and Gigante in 2005. Other notable inmates held at MCFP Springfield for treatment include Robert Stroud, known as the "Birdman of Alcatraz" who died there in 1963, racecar driver Randy Lanier, drug trafficker Michael Riconosciuto, and "The Toxic Pharmacist" Robert Courtney. Terrorists Omar Abdel Rahman and José Padilla were also held there for brief periods.

== Notable incidents ==
On January 26, 2010, inmate Victor Castro-Rodriguez, 51, was found dead on the floor of his cell. Castro-Rodriguez originally was convicted of assault and resisting arrest in the U.S. District Court of Southern Florida and was being held at the MCFP because of a mental illness. MCFP inmates Wesley Paul Coonce Jr., 34, and Charles Michael Hall, 43, were charged in connection with his death and on May 7, 2014, were convicted of one count of first-degree murder. Coonce was also found guilty of one count of murder by an inmate serving a life sentence. Both were sentenced to death on June 2, 2014.

== Notable inmates ==
- The following inmates are currently held at MCFP Springfield or served the majority of their sentence there.

† Inmates who were released from custody prior to 1982 are not listed on the Bureau of Prisons website.

=== Living ===
Inmate Name	Register Number	Photo	Status	Details
James Alex Fields Jr.	22239-084		Serving a life sentence; currently at USP Allenwood.	White supremacist, pleaded guilty in 2019 of 29 federal hate crime charges using his car to harm counter-protestors during the Unite the Right rally in Charlottesville, Virginia, killing 32 year-old Heather Heyer and injuring up to 19 more. Previously held at USP Hazelton and USP Allenwood.
Marvin Charles Gabrion	09184-055		Serving a life sentence, commuted from the death penalty. Originally sentenced to death on March 16, 2002.	Convicted in 2002 of the 1997 kidnapping and murder of 19-year-old Rachel Timmerman, who had accused Gabrion of rape; Tried federally as victim's body was found on federal land. Gabrion was the first person to receive a federal death sentence in a non-death penalty state since the federal death penalty was reinstated in 1988. Commuted from the death penalty by President Joe Biden on December 23, 2024.
Michael Sarno	01042-424		Serving a 25-year sentence, scheduled for release in 2031.	Italian-American mobster, who is a powerful captain in the Chicago Outfit who leads the Cicero crew.
Noshir Gowadia	95518-022		Transferred from ADX Florence. Serving a 32-year sentence; scheduled for release on October 28, 2028.	Former engineer for the U.S. Department of Defense and one of the principal designers of the B-2 stealth bomber; convicted in 2011 of using classified information to assist the People's Republic of China with producing cruise missiles with stealth technology.
José Padilla	20796-424		Transferred from ADX Florence then briefly to MCC Chicago. Released on November 12, 2026, after serving a 21-year sentence.	Al-Qaeda operative and one of the first U.S. citizens to be designated as an enemy combatant after the September 11 attacks; convicted in 2007 of terrorism conspiracy for traveling overseas to attend an al-Qaeda training camp and for providing material support to terrorists.
Ronell Wilson	71460-053		Serving a life sentence.	Gang leader in Staten Island, New York; murdered NYPD Detectives James Nemorin and Rodney Andrews, who were conducting a sting operation to buy an illegal gun in 2003. Wilson was initially on death row before having his sentence reduced to life without parole on the grounds of that he was mentally disabled.

=== Released ===
Inmate Name	Register Number	Photo	Status	Details
Andrija Artukovic	N/A†		Released in July of 1985 and extradited to Yugoslavia.	Minister of the Interior and State Secratery for the Independent State of Croatia and leading figure in the Ustashe. He was a key figure in the mass murder of Serbs, Jews, and Roma and oversaw the operation of multiple concentration camps.
Joseph "Joe Bananas" Bonanno	07255-008		Released from custody in 1986 after serving 14 months at MCFP Springfield.	Boss of the Bonanno crime family in New York City from 1931 to the mid-1960s; imprisoned for refusing to testify in a federal racketeering trial of the leaders of the five New York Mafia families.
Fritz Duquesne	N/A†		Released from custody on compassionate grounds in 1954; served 14 years.	Convicted in 1941 of leading the Duquesne Spy Ring, a group of spies for the Nazis which operated in the US from 1939 to 1941 and aimed to obtain information regarding military and industrial sabotage targets; all ring members were convicted in what was the largest espionage case in US history.
John Demjanjuk	N/A†		Extradited to Israel in 1986.	Former Trawniki and concentration camp guard at Treblinka, Sobibor, Majdanek, and Flossenbürg.
Larry Flynt	78407-012		Released from custody in 1984; served 6 months at FMC Butner and MCFP Springfield.	Publisher of the pornographic magazine Hustler and the center of several high-profile First Amendment cases; imprisoned for contempt of court for disrespecting a federal judge.
Daniel Larson	12626-511		Released in January 2026 and transferred to FCI Engelwood.	Outsider artist and YouTuber incarcerated for multiple terroristic threats against the Federal Government.
Anastasy Vonsyatsky	N/A†		Held at MCFP Springfield from 1942 to 1946	Russian-born American fascist leader; convicted under the Espionage Act of 1917 for his associations with Nazi sympathisers during World War II; released early.
Henri Young	N/A†		Held at MCFP Springfield from 1948 to 1957.	Bank robber and murderer; attempted to escape from Alcatraz Federal Penitentiary in 1939; Young was the subject of the 1995 film Murder in the First.
Rosario "Russell" Bufalino	04891-054		Held at MCFP Springfield from 1987 to 1989.	An Italian-born American mobster who became the Boss of the Northeastern Pennsylvania crime family known as the Bufalino crime family from 1959 - 1994. He was a cousin of attorney William "Bill" Bufalino, the longtime counsel for Jimmy Hoffa.

=== Died at MCFP Springfield ===
Inmate Name	Register Number	Photo	Status	Details
Robert Henry Best	N/A†		Died in 1952 while serving a life sentence	American Nazi collaborator and radio broadcaster of Nazi propaganda
Juan Matta-Ballesteros	37671-133		Served a life sentence under the name Juan Ramon Matta-Lopez.	Drug kingpin with ties to the Medellin Cartel in Colombia; convicted in 1990 of orchestrating the 1985 kidnapping and murder of Drug Enforcement Administration Agent Enrique Camarena. He died at the facility in October 2025.
Herbert John Burgman	N/A†		Died in 1953	American Nazi collaborator and radio broadcaster of Nazi propaganda
Anthony "Tony Ducks" Corallo	08341-016		Died in 2000.	The Boss of the Lucchese Crime Family From 1973 - 1986. in 1986 sentenced to 100 years along with then Underboss Salvatore "Tom-Mix" Santoro and then Consigliere Christopher "Christie Tick" Funari.
Clayton Fountain	89129-132		Died in 2004 while serving a life sentence.	Member of the Aryan Brotherhood prison gang; murdered Correction Officer Robert Hoffman at the United States Penitentiary, Marion in 1983; held in solitary confinement until his death. The incident resulted in a 23-year lockdown at Marion, and contributed to the creation of the federal supermax prison, Florence ADX.
Chin Gigante			Deceased December 19, 2005.	American mobster who was boss of the Genovese Crime Family in New York City from 1981 to 2005. Gigante was sentenced to 12 years in prison for conspiracy to commit murder in 1997, and plead guilty to an additional charge of racketeering in 2002.
John Gotti	18261-053		Deceased, June 10, 2002.	John "The Teflon Don" Gotti was head of New York's Gambino crime family. One of the most powerful and dangerous crime bosses in the world, Gotti was charged with five counts of murder, conspiracy to commit murder, loansharking, illegal gambling, obstruction of justice, bribery and tax evasion. Convicted on all counts, he was sentenced to life imprisonment without possibility of parole and a $250,000 fine.
Kareem Ibrahim	64657-053		Died in 2016 while serving a life sentence	Convicted in 2012 for conspiracy to commit a terrorist attack at JFK Airport died in 2016 from Heart Failure
Hemant Lakhani	25753-050		Died in 2013 while serving a 47-year sentence.	British businessman; convicted in 2005 of providing material support for terrorism and other charges for attempting to sell shoulder-fired missiles to what he thought was a terrorist group intent on shooting down US airliners.
Gennaro "Gerry Lang" Langella	10405-054		Died in 2013.	Was the Acting Boss Of the Colombo Crime Family During the '80s most notable for being a defendant in the Windows Trial in 1987 and being convicted and sentenced to 40+ years.
Anthony "Fat Tony" Salerno	12812-054		Died in 1992.	Was the Front Boss for the Genovese Crime Family from 1981 - 1986 after being convicted in the Windows Trial and being sentenced to 100 years.
Garrett Brock Trapnell	72021-158		Died in 1993 while serving a life sentence; served the majority of his sentence at USP Marion.	Serial bank robber; convicted in 1973 of aircraft hijacking and in 1974 of armed robbery and conspiracy to commit kidnapping.
Frank "Cadillac Frank" Salemme	24914-013		Died on December 20th 2022 Serving a life sentence	Boston mobster who became a hitman and eventually the boss of the Patriarca crime family from 1991 - 1996.
Walter Myers	29796-016		Died on March 12th 2026 while serving a life sentence.	Convicted of espionage in relation to his spying activities for Cuba while working for the U.S. State Department.
Robert Spangler	29442-013		Died of cancer on August 5, 2001, while serving a life sentence.	Serial killer who murdered his first wife and two children in 1978 in Littleton, Colorado and his third wife at the Grand Canyon in Arizona in 1993. Pleaded guilty in October 2000 to murder on federal land of his third wife. Sentenced to life imprisonment.
David Waters	95107-080		Died in 2003 from lung cancer	Known for his role in the kidnapping, robbery and murder of the famed atheist Madalyn Murray O'Hair, her son Jon Garth and granddaughter Robyn in 1995.
Robert Franklin Stroud			Died November 21, 1963	The "Birdman of Alcatraz"
Gary Lee Sampson	23976-038		Died on December 21, 2021.	Carjacked and murdered three people in 2001. Sentenced to death on December 23, 2003, and resentenced to death on January 9, 2017.
Clarence Carnes	61805-132		Died on October 3, 1988	Murdered a man in Oklahoma, and later participated in the Battle of Alcatraz. Carnes was the only participating inmate to neither be killed nor executed afterwards.

== In popular culture ==
John Sacrimoni, boss of the fictional Lupertazzi crime family in the hit HBO television series The Sopranos, dies at MCFP Springfield in the season 6 episode entitled "Stage 5".

Ercole "Eckley" DiMeo of the fictional Soprano crime family in the hit HBO television series The Sopranos is only seen in the many Saints of Newark and is the boss of the DiMeo crime family and it is mentioned in season one that he is incarcerated here.

The American crime drama hit limited series Black Bird follows the true story of FBI Operative Jimmy Keene (birth name James Keene) during his time at MCFP Springfield. The series is based on the 2010 autobiographical novel In with the Devil: a Fallen Hero, a Serial Killer, and a Dangerous Bargain for Redemption by James Keene with Hillel Levin.

== Gallery ==
Photos of the U.S. Medical Center for Federal Prisoners in Springfield
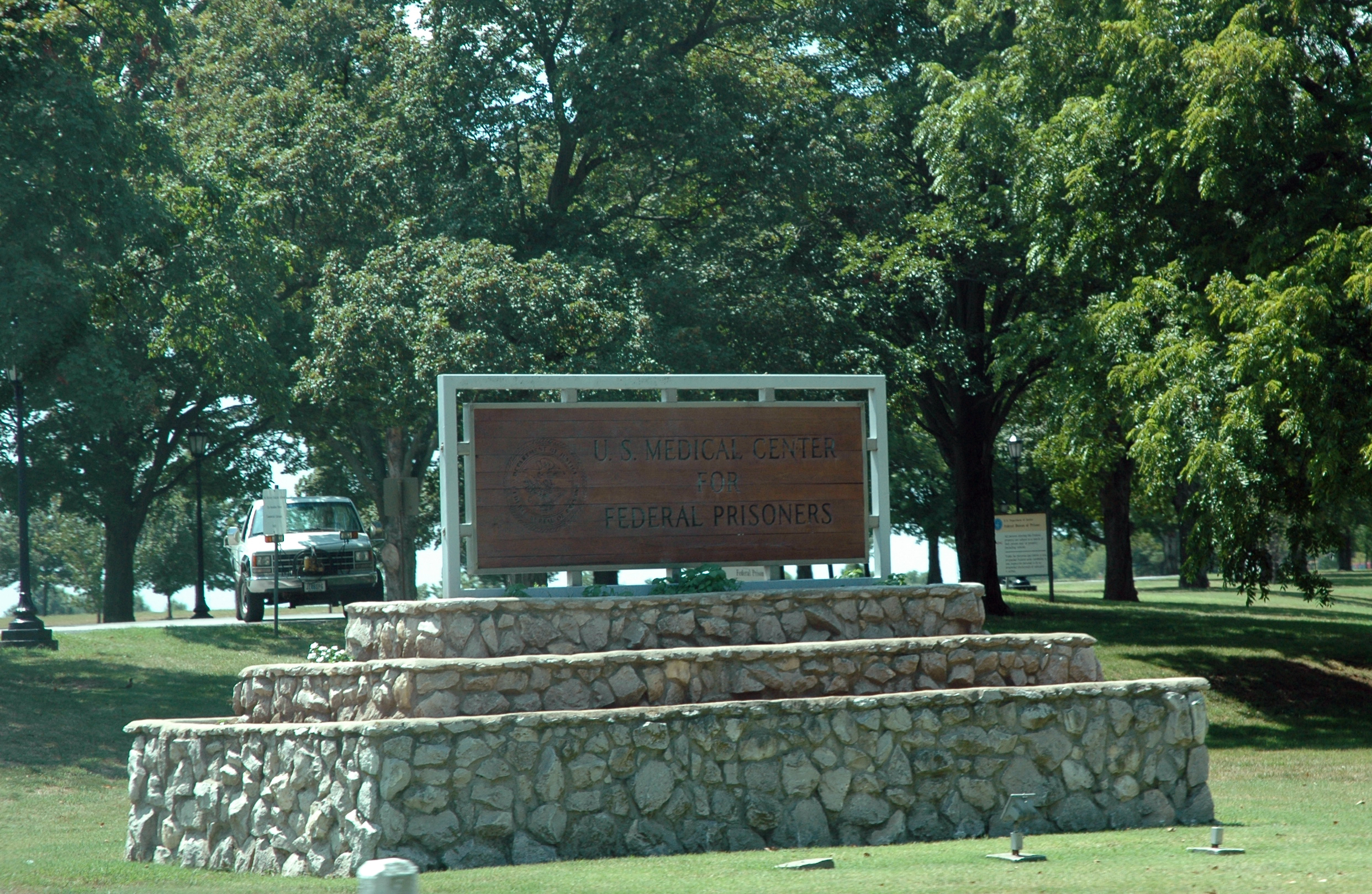
The entrance to the medical center in August 2006.

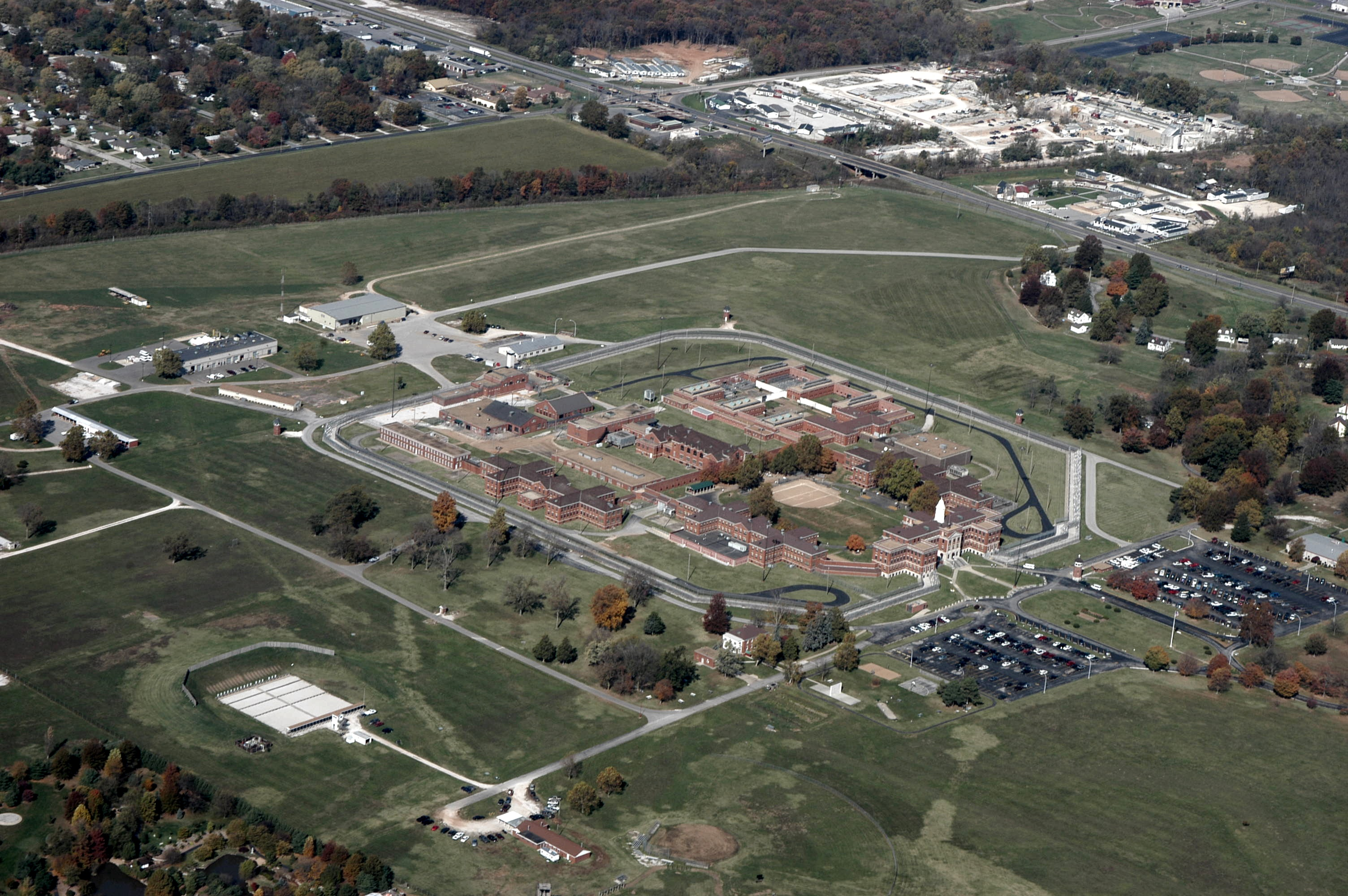
Aerial view of the medical center in October 2003.

== See also ==
- List of United States federal prisons
- Federal Bureau of Prisons
- Incarceration in the United States

== Sources ==
- Duffy, Peter (2014). Double Agent. New York: Scribner. ISBN 978-1-4516-6795-0.
