= Robert Henry Best =

American journalist and Nazi propagandist

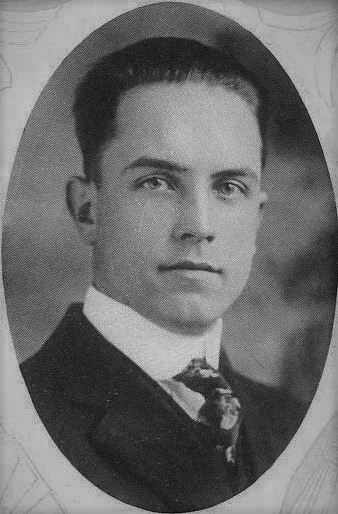
- Best in 1914
- Born: April 16, 1896; Sumter, South Carolina, U.S.
- Died: December 16, 1952 (aged 56); MCFP Springfield, Springfield, Missouri, U.S.
- Education: Wofford College (1916) Columbia University School of Journalism (1922)
- Occupations: Radio broadcaster, journalist, propagandist
- Status: Deceased
- Conviction: Treason (2 counts)
- Penalty: Life imprisonment
- Military career
- Allegiance: United States
- Branch: United States Army
- Service years: 1917 – 1920
- Unit: Coastal Artillery Corps

Robert Henry Best (April 16, 1896 – December 16, 1952) was an American foreign correspondent who covered events in Europe for American media outlets during the interwar period. He later became a supporter of the Nazis and a well-known broadcaster of Nazi propaganda during World War II. After the war, Best was arrested and returned to the United States to stand trial for collaboration. In 1948, Best was convicted of treason and sentenced to life imprisonment. He died in prison in 1952.

== Biography ==
Best was born in Sumter, South Carolina, a son of Rev. Albert Hartwell Best, a Methodist minister. After graduating from Wofford College in 1916, he joined the United States Army Coast Artillery Corps in October 1917. He was commissioned in 1918 and stayed in the U.S. Army until 1920. Then he went to the School of Journalism at Columbia University, from which he graduated in 1922.

With the money from a $1,500 Pulitzer Traveling Scholarship, he traveled extensively in Europe, arriving in Vienna in 1923, where he settled and found work as a foreign freelance news correspondent for the United Press. He also contributed articles to The New York Times, Chicago Daily News, Time and Newsweek.

During the interwar period, Best covered events in Central Europe from his headquarters in Vienna. The foreign journalists of the period met daily at the Café Louvre in Vienna, where Best and Marcel Fodor presided at the stammtisch ('regulars’ table') where journalists and their friends socialized and shared information. "He was, in a way, a Vienna institution."

Dan Durning summarizes the Vienna milieu in which Best played a leading role:

Best cut a flamboyant figure at his reserved table in the Café Louvre. A broad-brimmed Stetson capped his 220-pound frame, and his high-laced shoes and wretched German were familiar to other habitués of Ringstrasse.. . . Scheu, recalling the evenings at Café Louvre, wrote: "Best...sat in a padded loge, with a view of Renngasse, that was reserved for him." In addition to the foreign journalists in Vienna around him, Best also "assembled a large number of refugees, hangers on, news tipsters, spies -- serious, but questionable people, who sat at his table and populated the surrounding tables at Café Louvre....People who came from abroad were astounded by what they saw at Café Louvre."

Best gradually fell under Nazi influence following the annexation of Austria by Nazi Germany, the Anschluss, on March 12, 1938.

In July 1941, United Press fired him for 'nonperformance', thus putting him in financial difficulties. He then made an approach to German State Radio for employment, but with no immediate success.

== Propaganda for Nazi Germany ==
When the United States declared war on Nazi Germany on December 11, 1941, Best was arrested along with other U.S. reporters and held for deportation at an internment camp in Bad Nauheim. There he decided to withdraw from the group of exchangeable Americans and remain with his fiancée Erna Maurer, an Austrian reporter for the Associated Press, whom he married on September 2, 1942.

Best then received permission to travel to Berlin unaccompanied where he met Werner Plack, a member of the Radio Division of the Foreign Office, who recruited him as a commentator for German State Radio. In "one of the most astounding Benedict Arnold cases of modern times," Best began, in April 1942, as a news editor and commentator for the Reichs-Rundfunk-Gesellschaft, German State Radio, working in the U.S.A. Zone. He broadcast talks to the U.S. under the pseudonym of 'Mr. Guess Who' presenting 'B.B.B.' (Best's Berlin Broadcasts). Best maintained nominal anonymity, stating during his first broadcast for Radio Berlin on April 10, 1942:

"Who are you, anyway? This is one of many questions which many would like to put to me at this moment. But unfortunately, I must remain for you merely 'Mr. Guess Who,' your self-appointed correspondent for the New World Order."

His primary propaganda targets were President Franklin D. Roosevelt, Winston Churchill, the Jews and the Soviet Union. John Carver Edwards, author of Berlin Calling: American Broadcasters in Service to the Third Reich said:

Best's broadcasts continued to blast the alleged enemies of Germany with unbridled vehemence. He ranted against 'funny Frankie,' FDR, as the dupe of America's Jewish interest, inveighed against the Semitic takeover of Masonic lodges in the United States (Best was a 32-degree Mason) and recounted lurid tales of Soviet cannibalism on the eastern front." On April 13, 1945, Best's program was not broadcast as scheduled. Instead, Best fled his Vienna apartment, according to Edwards, but he forgot a cache of personal papers that would later help to convict him.

Recordings of some of Best's broadcasts are located in Record Group 60 General Records of the Department of Justice—Sound Recordings at the National Archives, Washington, DC.

Best was notable for continuously making suggestions to his superiors of ways to heighten the effectiveness of German psychological warfare.

== Arrest and trial ==
On July 26, 1943, Best along with Fred W. Kaltenbach, Douglas Chandler, Edward Delaney, Constance Drexel, Jane Anderson, Max Otto Koischwitz and Ezra Pound had been indicted in absentia by a District of Columbia grand jury on charges of treason. Best was arrested on January 29, 1946, by British forces in Carinthia, Austria and handed over to the U.S. Army. He was then flown to the United States to stand trial, arriving in Massachusetts on December 14, 1946.

Best was arraigned on January 20, 1947, and stood trial at the Boston Federal District Court on March 29, 1948. He acted as his own lawyer before U.S. District Judge Francis Ford. The witnesses at his trial included Princess Sofia zur Lippe-Weissenfeld of Austria and fellow American-born Nazi propagandist Edward Vieth Sittler. On April 16, 1948, Best was convicted of 12 counts of treason, with the jury's special finding that he actually gave "aid and comfort to the enemy". He had admitted in court the authorship of his broadcasts. He was sentenced to life imprisonment and fined $10,000.

Best appealed his conviction in 1950 (Best v. United States., 184 F.2d 131 (1st Cir. 1950)). Best once more acted as his own lawyer. The appeal court affirmed the judgment of the District Court. Best further appealed to the U.S. Supreme Court which refused to review the treason conviction on February 27, 1951.

== Death ==
Best served his sentence at the federal prison in Danbury, Connecticut. On August 12, 1951, he was transferred to the Medical Center for Federal Prisoners in Springfield, Missouri. Best died there of a brain hemorrhage on December 16, 1952, and was buried at the Pacolet Methodist Church Cemetery, Pacolet, South Carolina, on December 21, 1952. Fellow Nazi propagandist Herbert John Burgman, another American who created broadcasts in support of the Nazi regime, died at the same prison as Best on the first anniversary of Best's death.

== Literature reference ==
Journalist William L. Shirer, author of The Rise and Fall of the Third Reich, in 1942 broke the story of Best's propaganda work for the Nazi regime and in 1948 testified at Best's trial for treason. Soon afterward, Shirer released a novel The Traitor (1950) in which "the main characters were journalists resembling Shirer and Best."

== See also ==
- Donald S. Day
- Mildred Gillars
