= Almoharín =

Almoharín, Spain
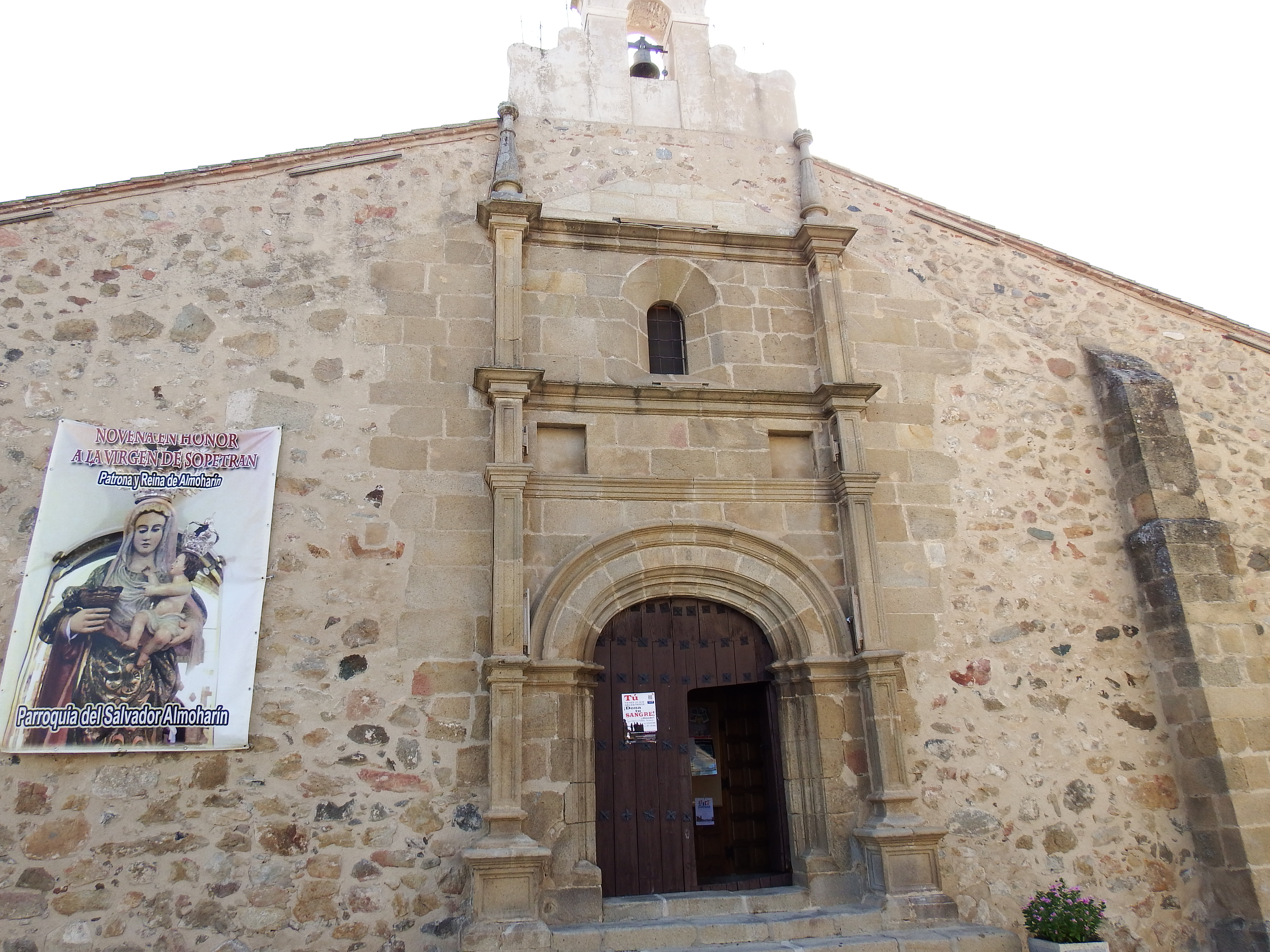
- Parish church in Almoharín

- Flag Coat of arms

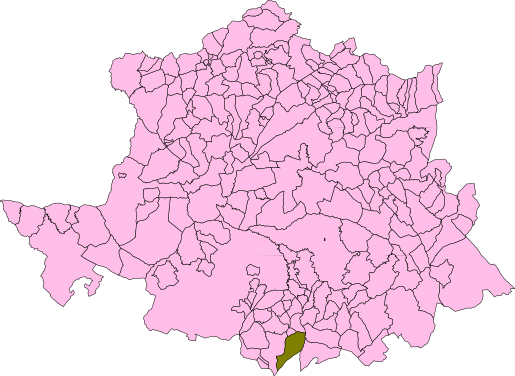
- Map of Almoharín
- Coordinates: 39°10′N 6°02′W
- Country: Spain
- Autonomous community: Extremadura
- Province: Cáceres
- Municipality: Almoharín

Area
  - Total: 97 km^{2} (37 sq mi)
- Elevation: 307 m (1,007 ft)

Population (2025-01-01)
  - Total: 1,771
  - Density: 18/km^{2} (47/sq mi)
- Time zone: UTC+1 (CET)
  - Summer (DST): UTC+2 (CEST)

Almoharín (Spanish pronunciation: [al.mo.aˈɾin]) is a municipality located in the province of Cáceres, Extremadura, Spain. According to the 2018 census (INE), the municipality has a population of 1,838 inhabitants.

The village's economy is primarily agricultural, with many inhabitants having fincas of olives and figs. Almoharin is known as the 'Fig Capital of the World' on account of these figs, which are green and smooth-textured. Both dried figs and chocolate figs are exported worldwide. The village also has a cheese-making workshop where visitors can make their own cheese - after milking the sheep. There is an accompanying exhibition of the history of sheep and cheese-making in the area.

Almoharin has a 16th-century church, and a traditional plaza. The Roman bridge, just outside the village, is the oldest architectural remains in the area.

== See also ==
- List of municipalities in Cáceres
