= Camp King =

Former military site near Frankfurt

Coordinates: 50°13′01″N 8°33′13″E

Camp King is a former military installation on the outskirts of Oberursel, Taunus (in Germany)that has served multiple purposes throughout its history. It began as a school for agriculture under the auspices of the University of Frankfurt. During World War II, the lower fields became an interrogation center for the German Air Force. After World War II, the United States Army also used it as an interrogation center and intelligence post. The United States CIA used the site to test drugs including LSD on prisoners as part of Project BLUEBIRD, the predecessor to MKUltra. In 1968, it became the command and control center for the United States Army Movements Control Agency - Europe (USAMCAEUR). Today it has been rebuilt as a German housing area.

== History ==
=== Prior to World War II (1926–1939) ===
Prior to World War II, what later became known as Auswertstelle West, was established in 1936 as an educational farm under the auspices of the University of Frankfurt. Students learned gardening, bee keeping, animal husbandry as well as general farming techniques. It was in essence an agricultural learning center.

=== World War II ===
During World War II the land below the school was adapted to military use as Auswertstelle West, often erroneously called Dulag Luft. The discrepancy arises due to the post initially being both the Dulag and the interrogation center. Dulag Luft was initially on the post, but later transferred to Frankfurt and later Wetzlar.

Activities at Auswertstelle West were intelligence-related. Captured allied air crews were brought to the post for interrogation. Once the interrogations were completed, they were transferred to their Stalag. The center housed many types of intelligence to include unit histories on most allied air forces.

During this time the post also picked up its nickname "The Goat Farm". The lands acquired for military use were below the school, which were agricultural. One of the fields was home to an aggressive goat that was noted for chasing prisoners who attempted to enter its territory.

After the defeat of Nazi Germany, the British convened a war crimes trial due to the allegations of ill treatment of British Prisoners of War at the facility. The hearing, known as the "Dulag Luft Trial", was convened in Wuppertal, Germany, beginning on November 26, 1945. Four officers were charged: Killenger, Junge, Eberhardt, and Boehringer. Killenger and Junge were sentenced to five years confinement. Eberhardt received three years. Boehringer was acquitted.

Meanwhile, the facility itself was put by the victors to their own use.

=== Post World War II (1945–1953) ===
As the war ended, the Americans stumbled across the post. Because the facilities were already designed for interrogations and intelligence gathering it was decided to continue using it for intelligence-gathering. Under U.S. control, the post was originally, unofficially, known as Camp Sibert (after General Edwin Sibert, the senior intelligence officer for the U.S. Zone), however it should not be confused with the domestic U.S. post of Camp Sibert in Alabama. Department of Defense records indicate that several Mobile Field Interrogation Units moved into the post to serve at the army and army group levels. On September 19, 1946, (General Order 264) named the intelligence center "Camp King", after Colonel Charles B. King, an intelligence officer who died on June 22, 1944, while accompanying a patrol bringing back prisoners.

Officially European Command Intelligence Center, Oberursel, it served as a United States interrogation center, engaged initially in denazification, and later for defectors from, and agents of, the Warsaw Pact. This included many intelligence sources as well as scientists.

The book The History of Camp King lists the following people:

- Karl Brandt, Hitler’s personal surgeon and in charge of sanitation.
- Grand Admiral Karl Dönitz, Commander of the German navy.
- Hans Frank, Reich Minister, Governor-General of occupied Poland.
- Reich Marshal Hermann Göring, Chief of the German Air Force. According to another source, he was never there.
- Colonel General Alfred Jodl, Chief of Operations Staff of the German Armed Forces.
- Field Marshal Wilhelm Keitel, chief of the Oberkommando der Wehrmacht.
- Field Marshal Albert Kesselring, Supreme Commander West.

Some civilians were held at the post, including German test pilot Hanna Reitsch and—at the request of the FBI, before her transfer to the United States and trial for treason—the German-American Mildred Elizabeth Sisk, one of the propagandists referred to as "Axis Sally".

In July 1946 General Reinhard Gehlen (former chief of the Wehrmacht Foreign Armies East military intelligence service on the eastern front during World War II) arrived on the post and established the Gehlen Organization which later went on to become the BND (Bundesnachrichtendienst, or "Federal Intelligence Service").

CIA experiments using drugs to attempt to break prisoners' ego control and elicit information were conducted here as part of Project BLUEBIRD (predecessor to MKUltra) under Sidney Gottlieb. As part of Operation Paperclip, Nazi doctor Kurt Blome, who participated in chemical and biological warfare experiments on concentration camp inmates during the Holocaust, was brought to Camp King by Gottlieb to participate in the research after Blome was acquitted of war crimes charges at the Nuremberg Doctors' Trial due to the intervention of the United States.

Walter Schreiber (a brigadier-general (Generalarzt) of the Wehrmacht Medical Service during World War II was also brought to Camp King. Schreiber had testified against Kurt Blome (and Hermann Göring) at the Nuremberg Doctors' Trial.

=== 1953–1968 ===
In 1953 Camp King was assigned to the 513th Military Intelligence Brigade. The post was still used as an interrogation center, but also assumed intelligence duties as a command center for many field offices in Europe.

The post was a major intelligence center for the European Theater. The unit supported many field offices throughout Germany. The units power was usurped as the unit became so large that instead of command and control it actually served in more of a support role. Col Franz Ross rectified this and the unit resumed its actual function.

In the fall of 1968, the 513th Military Intelligence Brigade merged with the 66th Military Intelligence Group and relocated to the McGraw Kaserne in Munich, Germany.

=== 1968 to 1993 ===
In 1968 the United States Army Movements Control Center - Europe (USAMCAEUR) was assigned to Camp King. The organization was reflagged on 1 April 1975 as the 4th Transportation Brigade (redesignated 4th Transportation Command on 16 April 1981), reactivating the colors of a unit that had been in Vietnam and inactivated on 28 June 1972 at Fort Lewis, WA, after its return. Its mission, as stated in military records, was to operate integrated transportation service in support of US forces in Central Europe.

The responsibilities encompassed:

- Operation of a military highway transportation system primarily known as the 37th Transportation Group (Trucks and Containers).
- Operation of military water terminals, notably in Bremerhaven, Germany, and Rotterdam, Netherlands (container ports).
- Reception, processing, and on-carriage transportation of military units deployed in Europe (US Army Reception Group Europe -USARGE).
- Movement and control of personnel and material.
- Traffic management for US forces in Central Europe.
- Preparation of USAREUR wartime movement program.
- Intra-theater transport, employing both US Air Force and US Army aircraft.
- Traffic regulation services for US forces in Central Europe.

The unit was inactivated in 1991 during the post-Cold War drawdown and its mission assigned to the 1st Transportation Movement Control Agency, which was formed from the command and control section of the former 4th TRANSCOM. In the spring of 1990, Headquarters, 22d Signal Brigade was moved to Camp King.

=== 1993 to present ===
In 1993 the post was deactivated and was returned to the German Government. Since that time it has been redeveloped into a housing area. In honor of the past, the people of Oberursel have named the area Camp King.

There is a small monument in the housing area to the history of the area as a military base.

== Bibliography ==
- Gehlen, Reinhard (1972). The Service: The Memoirs of General Reinhard Gehlen. New York City: World Publishing. ISBN 978-0-529044556.
- Koch, Egmont R. & Wech, Michael (12 August 2002). Deckname Artischocke [Codename Artichoke] (Documentary) (in German). Bremen, Germany: Egmont R. Koch Filmproduktion.
- "1st Theater Movement Control Agency, US Army, Europe".
- 22nd Signal Brigade website
- Kinzer, Stephen (2019). Poisoner in Chief; Sidney Gottlieb and the CIA Search for Mind Control. New York: Henry Holt & Co. ISBN 978-1-250140432.

=== Other sources ===
- Numerous Department of Defense documents received from The Historian Headquarter Europe
- E-mail from John Finnegan, Historian Inscom.
- E-Mails from Sandi Andresen
