= Mildred Gillars =

American Nazi propagandist (1900–1988)

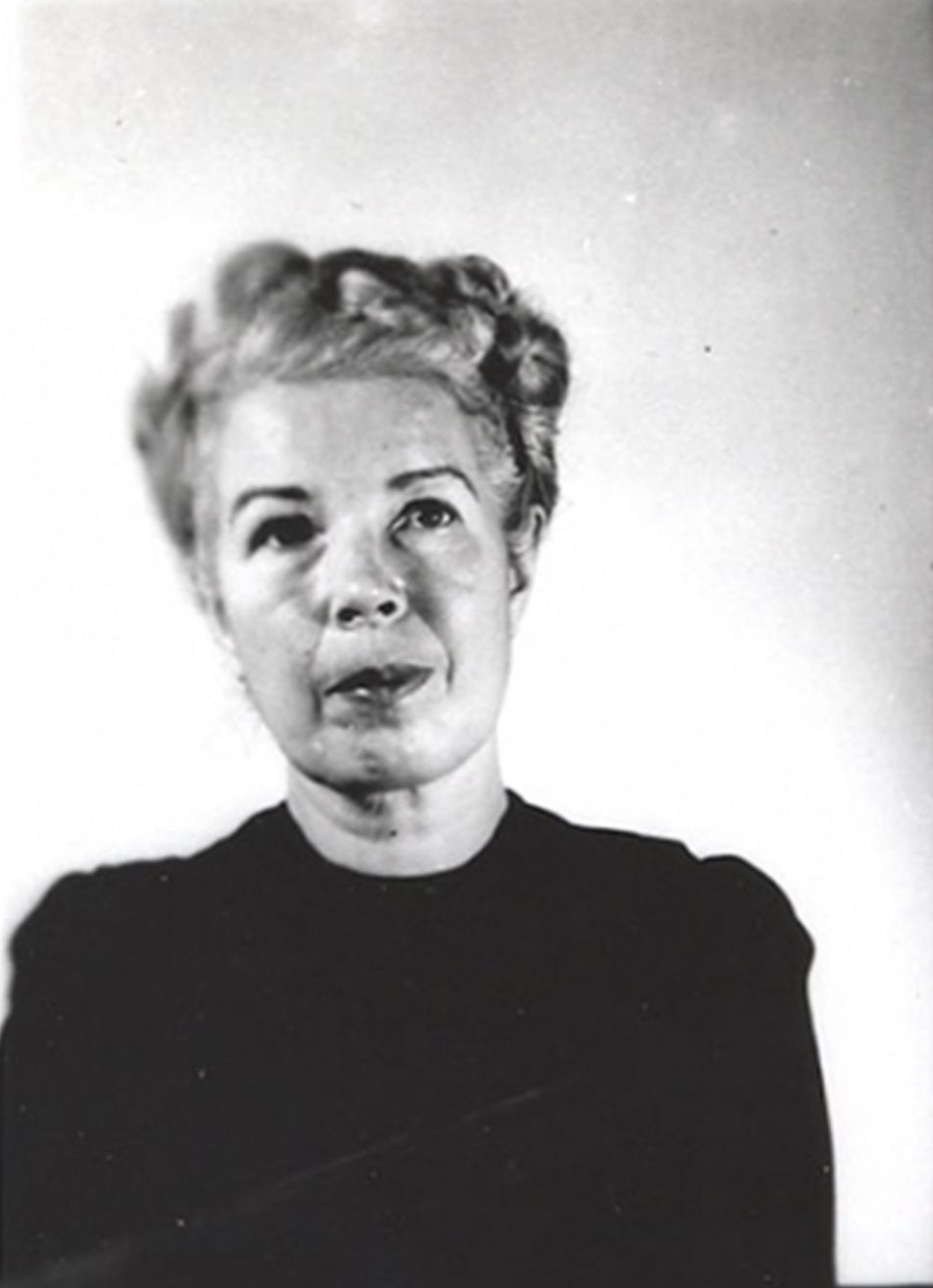
- Gillars's prison photo, 1949
- Born: Mildred Elizabeth Sisk; November 29, 1900; Portland, Maine, U.S.
- Died: June 25, 1988 (aged 87); Columbus, Ohio, U.S.
- Resting place: Saint Joseph Cemetery, Lockbourne, Ohio
- Other names: Midge at the Mike; Axis Sally
- Occupation: Radio broadcaster
- Years active: 1940–1945
- Known for: Presenting Nazi propaganda on German State Radio, directed to U.S. troops and audience, during World War II
- Status: Paroled (1961)
- Conviction: Treason
- Penalty: 10 to 30 years imprisonment

Mildred Elizabeth Gillars (née Sisk; November 29, 1900 – June 25, 1988) was an American broadcaster employed by Nazi Germany to disseminate Axis propaganda during World War II. Following her capture in post-war Berlin, Gillars became the first woman to be convicted of treason against the United States. In March 1949, she was sentenced to ten to thirty years' imprisonment. Gillars was paroled in 1961. Along with Rita Zucca she was nicknamed "Axis Sally".

== Early life ==
She was born Mildred Elizabeth Sisk in Portland, Maine, to parents Vincent Sisk and Mae Hewitson. After her mother and father divorced, she took the surname Gillars in 1911 when her mother married Robert Bruce Gillars. Her family resided in Bellevue, Ohio, where Robert Gillars was a dentist.

At 16, she moved to Conneaut, Ohio with her family. In 1918, she enrolled at Ohio Wesleyan University to study dramatic arts, but left without graduating.

Gillars then moved to Greenwich Village, New York City, where she worked in various low-skilled jobs to finance drama lessons. She toured with stock companies and appeared in vaudeville but was unable to establish a theatrical career. Gillars also worked as an artist's model for sculptor Mario Korbel but was unable to find regular employment.

In 1929, she moved to France and lived in Paris for six months. In 1933, Gillars left the United States again, residing first in Algiers where she found work as a dressmaker's assistant.

In 1934, she moved to Dresden, Germany, to study music and was later employed as a teacher of English, at the Berlitz School of Languages in Berlin.

== Work as a Nazi propagandist ==
On 6 May 1940, Gillars obtained work as an announcer with the Reichs-Rundfunk-Gesellschaft (RRG), German State Radio. She became their highest paid employee, and sometimes went by the name of "Midge at the mike".

By 1941, the U.S. State Department was advising U.S. citizens to leave Germany and German-controlled territories. However, Gillars chose to remain because her fiancé, Paul Karlson, a naturalized German citizen, said he would never marry her if she returned to the United States. Shortly afterwards, Karlson was sent to the Eastern Front, where he was killed in action. Gillars' initial broadcasts were largely apolitical, but started with the phrase "this is Berlin calling". Eventually, she started a relationship with Max Otto Koischwitz, the German-American program director in the USA Zone at the RRG. In 1942, Koischwitz cast Gillars in a new show called Home Sweet Home and included her in his political broadcasts. Gillars soon acquired several names amongst her GI audience, including the "Bitch of Berlin", "Berlin Babe", "Olga", and "Sally", but the most common was "Axis Sally". This name probably came when, asked on air to describe herself, Gillars said she was "the Irish type ... a real Sally." Gillars expressed anti-Semitic sentiments during her broadcasts. During one broadcast, she said "I say damn Roosevelt and Churchill, and all of their Jews who have made this war possible."

In 1943, an Italian-American woman, Rita Zucca, also began broadcasting to U.S. forces from Rome using the name "Sally". The two often were confused with each other and even thought by many to be the same, though Gillars was annoyed that another woman was broadcasting under her name.

Gillars' main programs from Berlin were:

- Home Sweet Home Hour, from December 24, 1942, until 1945, a regular propaganda program aimed at making U.S. forces in Europe feel homesick and discouraged. A running theme of these broadcasts was the infidelity of soldiers' wives and sweethearts while the listeners were stationed in Europe and North Africa. She questioned whether the women would remain faithful, "especially if you boys get all mutilated and do not return in one piece". Opening with the sound of a train whistle, Home Sweet Home attempted to exploit the fears of American soldiers about the home front. The broadcasts were designed to make soldiers feel doubt about their mission, their leaders, and their prospects after the war.
- Midge at the Mike, broadcast from March to late fall 1943, in which she played U.S. songs interspersed with defeatist propaganda, anti-Semitic rhetoric, and attacks on Franklin D. Roosevelt.
- GI's Letter-box and Medical Reports (1944), directed at the U.S. home audience in which Gillars used information on wounded and captured U.S. airmen to cause fear and worry in their families. After D-Day (June 6, 1944), Gillars and Koischwitz worked for a time from Chartres and Paris for this purpose, visiting hospitals and interviewing POWs, falsely claiming to be a representative of the International Red Cross. In 1943, they had toured POW camps in Germany, interviewing captured U.S. soldiers and recording their messages for their families in the U.S. The interviews were then edited for broadcast as though the speakers were well-treated or sympathetic to the Nazi cause.

Gillars made her most famous broadcast on May 11, 1944, a few weeks before the D-Day invasion of Normandy, in a radio play written by Koischwitz called Vision of Invasion. She played Evelyn, an Ohio mother, who dreams that her son had died a horrific death on a ship in the English Channel during an attempted invasion of Occupied Europe. He came to her after he died in the dream and told her of the horror he saw, whilst in the background there were shrieks and moans of men suffering in battle.

Koischwitz died in August 1944, and Gillars' broadcasts became lackluster and repetitive without his creative energy. She remained in Berlin until the end of the war. Her last broadcast was on May 6, 1945, just two days before the surrender of Germany.

== Arrest, trial, and imprisonment ==
The U.S. attorney general dispatched prosecutor Victor C. Woerheide to Berlin to find and arrest Gillars. He and Counterintelligence Corps special agent Hans Winzen only had one solid lead: Raymond Kurtz, a B-17 pilot shot down by the Germans, recalled that a woman who had visited his prison camp seeking interviews was the broadcaster who called herself "Midge at the Mike", and had used the alias Barbara Mome. Woerheide organized wanted posters with Gillars' picture to put up in Berlin, and the breakthrough came when he was informed that a woman calling herself "Barbara Mome" was selling her furniture at second-hand markets around the city. A shop owner whose stock contained a table belonging to Gillars was detained and under "intensive interrogation" revealed Gillars' address. When she was arrested on March 15, 1946, Gillars asked only to take with her a picture of Koischwitz.

She was then held by the Counterintelligence Corps at Camp King, Oberursel, along with collaborators Herbert John Burgman and Donald S. Day, until she was conditionally released from custody on December 24, 1946; however, she declined to leave military detention. She was abruptly re-arrested on January 22, 1947, after being offered conditional release by the United States at the request of the Justice Department and was eventually flown to the United States on August 21, 1948, to await trial on charges of aiding the German war effort.

Press coverage of Mildred Gillars' trial in 1949

Gillars was indicted on September 10, 1948, and charged with ten counts of treason, but only eight were used at her trial, which began on January 25, 1949. The prosecution relied on the large number of her programs recorded by the Federal Communications Commission, stationed in Silver Hill, Maryland, to show her participation in propaganda activities directed at the United States. It was also shown that Gillars had taken an oath of allegiance to Adolf Hitler. The defense argued that her broadcasts stated unpopular opinions but did not amount to treasonable conduct. They also argued that she was under the hypnotic influence of Koischwitz and therefore not fully responsible for her actions until after his death. On March 10, 1949, the jury convicted Gillars on just one count of treason, that of making the Vision of Invasion broadcast. She was sentenced to 10 to 30 years in prison and required to pay a $10,000 fine ($135,000 today). The judge spared Gillars from a harsher sentence since she had not participated in high-level Nazi propaganda policy conferences as was the case with Douglas Chandler and Robert Henry Best. In 1950, the U.S. Court of Appeals for the District of Columbia upheld the conviction.

Gillars served her sentence at the Federal Reformatory for Women in Alderson, West Virginia. She became eligible for parole in 1959, but did not apply until 1961. She was released on June 10, 1961.

== Later life ==
Having converted to Catholicism while in prison, Gillars went to live at the Our Lady of Bethlehem Convent in Columbus, Ohio, and taught German, French, and music at St. Joseph Academy, Columbus. In 1973, aged 72, she returned to Ohio Wesleyan University to complete her degree, a Bachelor of Arts in speech.

Throughout her life Gillars was unapologetic about her association with Nazism. Shortly before her death, a neighbor claimed that Gillars showed her a cup that Gillars described as one of her most cherished possessions. She said that it had been given to her by Heinrich Himmler, leader of the SS. Gillars died of colon cancer at Grant Medical Center in Columbus on June 25, 1988. She is buried at Saint Joseph Cemetery in Lockbourne, Ohio.

== Film ==
In the 2021 film, American Traitor: The Trial of Axis Sally, Gillars is portrayed by Meadow Williams. James Joseph Laughlin, Sr. (1896–1976) – the lawyer who defended Mildred Gillars – was portrayed by Al Pacino.

In Spike Lee's 2008 film Miracle at St. Anna, Gillars is portrayed by Alexandra Maria Lara, broadcasting from Berlin to the front line in Italy to demoralize the Buffalo Soldiers before a German attack.

== See also ==
- Donald S. Day
- Douglas Chandler
- Herbert John Burgman
- Iva Toguri D'Aquino
- Jane Anderson (journalist)
- Robert Henry Best
- Tokyo Rose
- Constance Drexel
- Ullrich Haupt (1915–1991)
- Propaganda in Nazi Germany
- Lord Haw-Haw
- Judith Coplon (1921–2011)

== Bibliography ==
- American Antiquarian Society. Proceedings of the American Antiquarian Society. Worcester, Massachusetts. LCCN 05-13654; ISSN 0044-751X; OCLC 1479298 (all editions).
- McCusker, John James II (October 1991). "How Much Is That in Real Money? A Historical Price Index for Use as a Deflator of Money Values in the Economy of the United States" (PDF). Vol. 101, Part 2. pp. 297–373. ISBN 978-0-9440-2633-5, 0-9440-2633-8; OCLC 26089551 (all editions).
- Table A–2: "Consumer Price Indexes, United States, 1700–1991" (PDF) (1st ed.). 1992. pp. 323–332.
- McCusker, John James II (October 16, 1996). "Addenda et Corrigenda" (to "How Much Is That in Real Money?" (PDF). Vol. 106. pp. 327–334 – via AAS.
- Andrews, Evan (August 13, 2013) [last updated: May 27, 2025]. "6 World War II Propaganda Broadcasters". History. Archived from the original on September 20, 2018.
- Beckman, James A.; Merriam, Eric (August 8, 2024). Crimes Against the State: Sedition, Rebellion, and Treason Since America's Founding. Bloomsbury Academic. pp. 51–52. LCCN 2024-6299 (print ed.), LCCN 2024-6300 (eBook); ISBN 978-1-4408-7907-4, 1-4408-7907-9 (hardback); ISBN 979-8-7651-2412-3 (paperback); ISBN 978-1-4408-7908-1, 1-4408-7908-7 (Pdf); ISBN 979-8-2161-7118-8 (eBook).
- Via Google Books (limited preview). p. 51.
- Blundo, Joseph "Joe" (January 30, 2011). "Sally's Axis of Evil Ended at Convent in Columbus". Columbus Dispatch. So to Speak | Joe Blundo Commentary (column). LCCN sn85-42506; ISSN 2689-4270, ISSN 1074-097X (online); OCLC 8736947 (all editions).
- Canberra Times (The) (August 23, 1948). "Spinster Charged With Treason". Vol. 22, no. 6670. Canberra. p. 1 (column 1). Archived from the original on March 10, 2022 – via Trove (National Library of Australia). ISSN 0157-6925 (print), ISSN 2653-0996 (web); OCLC 220340116 (all editions).
- Christenson, Ron, ed. (1991). Political Trials in History: From Antiquity to the Present. New Brunswick: Transaction Publishers. pp. 152–155. LCCN 90-19489; ISBN 978-0-8873-8406-6, 0-8873-8406-4; OCLC 22596597 (all editions).
- Via Internet Archive (CSUN, withdrawn).
- Via Google Books (limited preview). pp. 152–155.
- Davis, Jack Flemings (Associated Press Bureau Chief) (July 10, 1961). "'Axis Sally' Out After 11 Years – Sister Takes GI Siren" (AP). Vol. 137, no. 8. Charleston, West Virginia. LCCN sn86-92146; OCLC 13060388 (all editions)
- Via West Virginia Archives & History (WV A&H) (The WV A&H website is hosted by the West Virginia Culture Center website). Archived from the original on June 7, 2025.
- Marsh, Don Seagle (July 11, 1961). Almost Silent 'Axis Sally' Gains Freedom. LCCN sn83-45151 (1907–2015); OCLC 9334859 (all editions).
- Via West Virginia Archives & History (WV A&H) (The WV A&H website is hosted by the West Virginia Culture Center website). Archived from the original on June 7, 2025.
- Crofton, Ian (2009). Traitors & Turncoats: Twenty Tales of Treason from Benedict Arnold to Ezra Pound. London: Quercus. ISBN 978-1-8486-6011-3, 1-8486-6011-1; OCLC 298185611 (all editions).
- Via Internet Archive (Kahle/Austin Foundation). p. 131.
- Department of Justice: Federal Bureau of Investigation. – via Internet Archive (National Security Archive, George Washington University National Security Internet Archive). Retrieved November 10, 2025.
- Newspaper Clippings. January 22, 1947.
- Newspaper Clippings. January 22, 1947.
- "'Axis Sally', 2 Other Broadcasters Released" (AP). Vol. 344, no. 73 (97th year). Salt Lake City: Deseret News/Associated Press. December 24, 1946. p. 2. ISSN 0745-4724; OCLC 367900153 (all editions).
- Via Newspapers.com.
- Via Google Books.
- Encyclopædia Britannica.
- The New Encyclopædia Britannica (12 Vols.) (15th ed.). 2007. LCCN 2006-921233; ISBN 978-1-5933-9292-5, 1-5933-9292-3.
- Vol. 5: "Gillars, Mildred". p. 267 – via Internet Archive.
- Britannica Online: "Mildred Gillars | American Traitor". Archived from the original on October 26, 2020. ISSN 1085-9721; OCLC 908423504 (all editions), 1330258956, 770455238, 1110200461.
- Federal Reserve Bank of Minneapolis. "Consumer Price Index (estimate) 1800–".
- Future Publishing Ltd.. Bath, England (formerly Bournemouth, England: Imagine Publishing Ltd.).
- All About History History's Biggest Traitors (magazine; special issue – non-serial; aka bookazine) (1st ed.). 2024 [2025] – via Internet Archive ISBN 978-1-8364-8013-6, 1-8364-8013-X; OCLC 1527587924 (all editions), 1526037880.
- "Axis Sally the Story of an All-American Traitor". pp. 28–33.
- All About History (ezine blog Andrew Brown, Editor from September 2013 to November 2014) (www.historyanswers.co.uk). ISSN 2052-5877
- Hoare, James Edward, ed. (May 6, 2014). "On This Day" – "Final Broadcast of Mildred Gillars (Axis Sally)". All About History. Archived from the original on March 7, 2018.
- History of War (magazine; monthly). Tim Williamson, Editor-in-Chief. ISSN 2054-376X; OCLC 1064860270 (all editions).
- Bowers, Alex (2022). "Axis Sally: True Story of an All-American Traitor" (Issue 111). Archived from the original on November 13, 2025.
- Gillars v. United States (docket no. 10,187), Vol. 182. Federal Reporter, Second Series; beginning on p. 962 of the printed ed. (U.S. Court of Appeals for the District of Columbia Circuit → Decided May 19, 1950).
- HistoryNet. HistoryNet LLC, owned and operated by World History Group.
- Harper, Dale Pascal (né Pascal Dale Hawkes; 1926–2009) (June 12, 2006). "Mildred Elizabeth Sisk: American-Born Axis Sally". Archived from the original on March 7, 2018. OCLC 45677445 (article).
- Originally published → "American-Born Axis Sally Made Propaganda Broadcasts for Radio Berlin in Hitler's Germany". World War II (bimonthly; every 2 months). "Convicted of Treason, American-Born Axis Sally Spent 12 Years in Federal Prison. Vol. 10, no. 4. Cowles History Group. November 1995. LCCN 90-660022; ISSN 0898-4204; OCLC 13545127 (all editions).
- Lucas, Richard (November 23, 2009). ""Axis Sally: The Americans Behind the Infamous Nazi Propaganda Broadcast"". HistoryNet. Archived from the original on May 25, 2022.
- Originally published → "With a Sweet Kiss from Sally – Investigators Hunt Down the Seductive Broadcaster". World War II (bimonthly; every 2 months). Vol. 24, no. 5. Primedia Enthusiast Publications. January–February 2010. p. 48.
- Hull, Mark M.; Moynes, Vera (May 28, 2017). Masquerade: Treason, the Holocaust, and an Irish Impostor. University of Oklahoma Press. p. 79. LCCN 2016-36175; ISBN 978-0-8061-5634-7, 0-8061-5634-1 (hardcover); ISBN 978-0-8061-5718-4, 0-8061-5718-6 (paperback); ISBN 978-0-8061-5836-5, 0-8061-5836-0 (eBook); OCLC 987098685 (all editions).
- Via Google Books (limited preview). p. 79.
- Jewish Virtual Library. "The Nazi Party: Women of the Third Reich" – "Mildred Elizabeth Gillars (1901–1988)". The American-Israeli Cooperative Enterprise (AICE). Archived from the original on May 4, 2017. OCLC 750248767 (all editions).
- Lucas, Richard. Axis Sally: The American Voice of Nazi Germany. Philadelphia: Casemate Publishers.

ISBN 978-1-9351-4980-4, 1-9351-4980-6 (2010), ISBN 978-1-4804-0660-5, 1-4804-0660-0 (Oct. 2010 digital), ISBN 978-1-9351-4943-9, 1-9351-4943-1 (Oct. 2010 hardcover), ISBN 978-1-6120-0139-5, 1-6120-0139-4 (Jan. 2013 paperback); OCLC 748408055 (all editions).

- 2010 ed. via Los Angeles Public Library.
- 2013 ed. via Google Books (limited preview). p. 42. Archived from the original on July 23, 2020.
- UK Film Review; Madden, Hope (May 27, 2021). "American Traitor: The Trial of Axis Sally – Film Review". Chris Olson, Editor-in-Chief. Archived from the original on June 4, 2021.
- Morton, Scott Ashley (2017). The Sirens of Wartime Radio: An Analysis of the Media Coverage of Five Legendary Female Propaganda Broadcasters (PhD dissertation). Tuscaloosa: University of Alabama Libraries. OCLC 999839609 (all editions).
- Pdf via University of Alabama Institutional Repository. Archived from the original on October 8, 2024.
- Morton, Scott Ashley (October 5, 2020). The Sirens of Wartime Radio and How the American Print Media Presented Them: The Stories, the Intrigue, and the Evolving Coverage of Their Legacies. Lanham, Maryland: Rowman & Littlefield.

LCCN 2020-942740; doi:10.5040/9781978733992; ISBN 978-1-7936-0145-2, 1-7936-0145-3 (hardcover), ISBN 978-1-7936-0147-6 (paperback), ISBN 978-1-7936-0146-9, 1-7936-0146-1 (eBook), ISBN 978-1-9787-8655-4, 1-9787-8655-7 (eBook), ISBN 978-1-9787-3399-2, 1-9787-3399-2 (online), OCLC 1222777049 (all editions).

- Via Google Books (limited preview). pp. 58–98.
- New York Times (The). ISSN 0362-4331.
- "Ex-Actor Outlines 'Axis Sally' Role – Tell's Capital Jury He and She Took Part in Nazi Broadcast to Discourage Invasion". Vol. 98, no. 33247 (Late City ed.). February 2, 1949. p. 7.
- Pdf via TimesMachine (PDF).
- Permalink via TimesMachine.
- "'Axis Sally' Is Found Guilty; Sentence on Treason Delayed" (AP). Vol. 98, no. 33284. March 11, 1949. p. 1. "March 10 – A Federal jury found Mildred E. (Axis Sally) Gillars guilty of treason today ..."
- Pdf via TimesMachine (PDF).
- Permalink via TimesMachine.
- NYTs blog ed..
- "Mildred Gillars, 87, Axis Sally During War". Vol. 137, no. 47553 (Late City ed.). July 1, 1988. ProQuest 426897192 (US Newsstream database).
- Pdf via TimesMachine (PDF).
- Permalink via TimesMachine. p. 8 (section B; digital image 40 of 96).
- NYTs blog ed..
- Pfau, Ann Elizabeth, PhD (December 30, 2009). "Axis Sally, 'The Greatest Generation,' and Generation Y". Pfau, from 2008 to 2011, was a historian researcher with the New York State Museum, Albany. Archived from the original on March 10, 2022 – via Academia.edu.
Pfau's paper was presented January 8, 2010, 9:50 AM, at the 124th Annual Meeting of the American Historical Association, San Diego: Theme: "Oceans, Islands, Continents" – Program 50: "Performance in France, the United States, and the Rio de la Plata, 1930s–40s." Nicholas John Cull, PhD, Chair ["124th Annual Meeting of the American Historical Association" (PDF)].
- Scribner Encyclopedia of American Lives (The) (8 Vols.). Kenneth T. Jackson, Karen Markoe, Arnie Markoe (eds.). New York: Charles Scribner's Sons. 1998. LCCN 98-33793.
- Vol 2: "1986–1990". ISBN 978-0-6848-0491-0, 0-6848-0491-3 (Vol. 2).
- Thomas, Theodore N. "Gillars, Mildred Elizabeth Sisk". pp. 327–328 – via Internet Archive.
- Suisman, David; Strasser, Susan, eds. (October 11, 2011) [2010]. Sound in the Age of Mechanical Reproduction. University of Pennsylvania Press. p. 67. LCCN 2009-24356; doi:10.9783/9780812206869; ISBN 978-1-2838-9114-1, 1-2838-9114-X, ISBN 978-0-8122-2229-6, 0-8122-2229-6 (paperback), ISBN 978-0-8122-4199-0, 0-8122-4199-1 (hardback), ISBN 978-0-8122-0686-9, 0-8122-0686-X (eBook); OCLC 320800463 (all editions).
- Via Internet Archive (limited preview; Kahle/Austin Foundation).
- Via Google Books (limited preview).
- Taylor, Blaine (May 2016). "Mildred Gillars (a.k.a. 'Axis Sally') in WWII". Military Heritage. Vol. 17, no. 6. McLean, Virginia: Sovereign Media. Archived from the original on August 16, 2022. LCCN sn99-8573; ISSN 1524-8666; OCLC 41272405 (all editions).
- Time. ISSN 0040-781X
- "Treason: Big Role". February 7, 1949. Archived from the original on January 31, 2011.
- "Treason: True to the Red, White & Blue". (alternate link). March 7, 1949. Archived from the original on March 10, 2008.
- "People, August 3, 1959". Archived from the original on November 6, 2012.
- "People, June 25, 1973". Archived from the original on October 27, 2010.
- United States vs. Mildred E. Gillars – 146-7-51-1708. Washington, D.C.: U.S. Department of Justice. Retrieved 7 November 2025.
- Papers (PDF) (Hans Max Haupt). January 22, 1947. p. 1.
- Papers (PDF). August 10, 1948. p. 2.
- Papers (PDF). February 10, 1947. p. 3.
- Papers (PDF). November 17, 1948. p. 4.
- Papers (PDF) (Haupt rail fare). p. 5.
- Papers (PDF). June 9, 1945. p. 6.
- Papers (PDF). January 22, 1946. p. 7.
- Papers (PDF) (Ullrich Haupt). February 25, 1947. p. 8.
- Papers (PDF). March 31, 1948. p. 9.
- Papers (PDF). p. 10.
- Papers (PDF). p. 11.
- Papers (PDF). p. 12.
- Papers (PDF). p. 13.
- Papers (PDF). p. 14.
- Papers (PDF). October 26, 1970. p. 15.
- Papers (PDF). April 25, 1948. p. 16.
- Page 17.
- Papers (PDF). July 22, 1948. p. 17a.
- Papers (PDF). October 7, 1948. p. 17b.
- Papers (PDF). p. 17c.
- Papers (PDF). p. 17e.
- Papers (PDF). March 23, 1948. p. 17d.
- Papers (PDF). p. 17e.
- Papers (PDF). July 5, 1948. p. 18.
- Page 19.
- Papers (PDF). October 18, 1948. p. 19a.
- Papers (PDF). p. 19b.
- Papers (PDF). p. 19c.
- Papers (PDF). p. 19d.
- Papers (PDF). p. 19e.
- Papers (PDF). November 19, 1948. p. 20.
- Papers (PDF). January 4, 1949. p. 21.
- Washington Post (The); Dutkin, Howard Lee (1911–1993) (February 25, 1949). "Hypnotic Influence Cited" – "Love for Mystic Professor Led Her to 'Destiny,' Sally Says". No. 26552. pp. 1 & 10. ProQuest 152169038 (Historical Newspapers database); ISSN 0190-8286; OCLC 2269358 (all editions).
- Yellin, Emily (11 May 2010) [2004, 2005]. Chapter 8: "Behind Enemy Lines – Spies, Propaganda Workers, and Those Who Worked for the Enemy." Our Mothers' War: American Women at Home and at the Front During World War II. Free Press. p. 249. LCCN 2004-40496; ISBN 978-0-7432-4514-2, 0-7432-4514-8 (hardback), ISBN 978-0-7432-4516-6, 0-7432-4516-4 (paperback), ISBN 978-1-4391-0358-6, 1-4391-0358-5 (eBook), OCLC 1512698619 (all editions).
- Via Internet Archive (limited preview). 2004. p. 248.
- Via Internet Archive (limited preview). 2005. p. 248.
- Via Google Books (limited preview). 2010. p. 249.

== General references ==
- Edwards, John Carver (June 30, 1991). Berlin Calling: American Broadcasters in Service to the Third Reich. New York, Westport, London: Praeger Publishers (Bloomsbury Academic). LCCN 90-20841; ISBN 978-0-2759-3905-2, 0-2759-3905-7 (hardback); OCLC 551404747 (all editions).
- Chapter 3: "Max Otto Koischwitz" – "Alias Mr. O.K.". pp. 58–98 – via Internet Archive (limited preview; Boston Public Library; Kahle/Austin Foundation).
- Fuller, Mary "Mimi" Williams (née Mary Patricia Williams; 1936–1922) (2004). Axis Sally: The Most Listened-To Woman of World War II (historical fiction) (1st ed.). Santa Barbara, California: Paradise West Publications. LCCN 2004-274976; ISBN 978-0-9723-6757-8, 0-9723-6757-8.
This book is a work of historical fiction that offers a dramatic, sympathetic portrayal of Gillars. The late Fuller presented a version of events that aligns with arguments raised at Gillars’s trial, suggesting she was emotionally manipulated by Koischwitz and drawn into broadcasting for Radio Berlin.
- Gillars, Mildred (Miss). Portrait Photograph [graphic] (photograph). Arnold Genthe (1869–1942), photographer. Washington, D.C.: Library of Congress, Prints and Photographs Division. June 17, 1928. LCCN 2018715691. Call No.: LC-G412- 5423-002.
- Gillars, Mildred (1943). [Axis Sally broadcast] (sound recording → 1 analog tape reel, 15 ips, 2-track, mono). Washington, D.C.: Library of Congress, Recorded Sound Research Center. LCCN 2005700755. OCLC 62724649. Call No.: LWO 4661 (preservation master).
- Mildred Gillars, "Axis Sally," Full-Length Portrait [graphic] (photograph). Seated on cot, smoking cigarette, in U.S. Counterintelligence Headquarters, Berlin, Germany. Library of Congress, New York World-Telegram and the New York Sun Newspaper Photograph Collection. Associated Press photograph No. 6607D. Washington, D.C. 1946. LCCN 97503391. OCLC 51117462. Call No.: NYWTS - BIOG — Gillars, Mildred — "Axis Sally".
