= Constance Drexel =

German-born American writer and accused spy

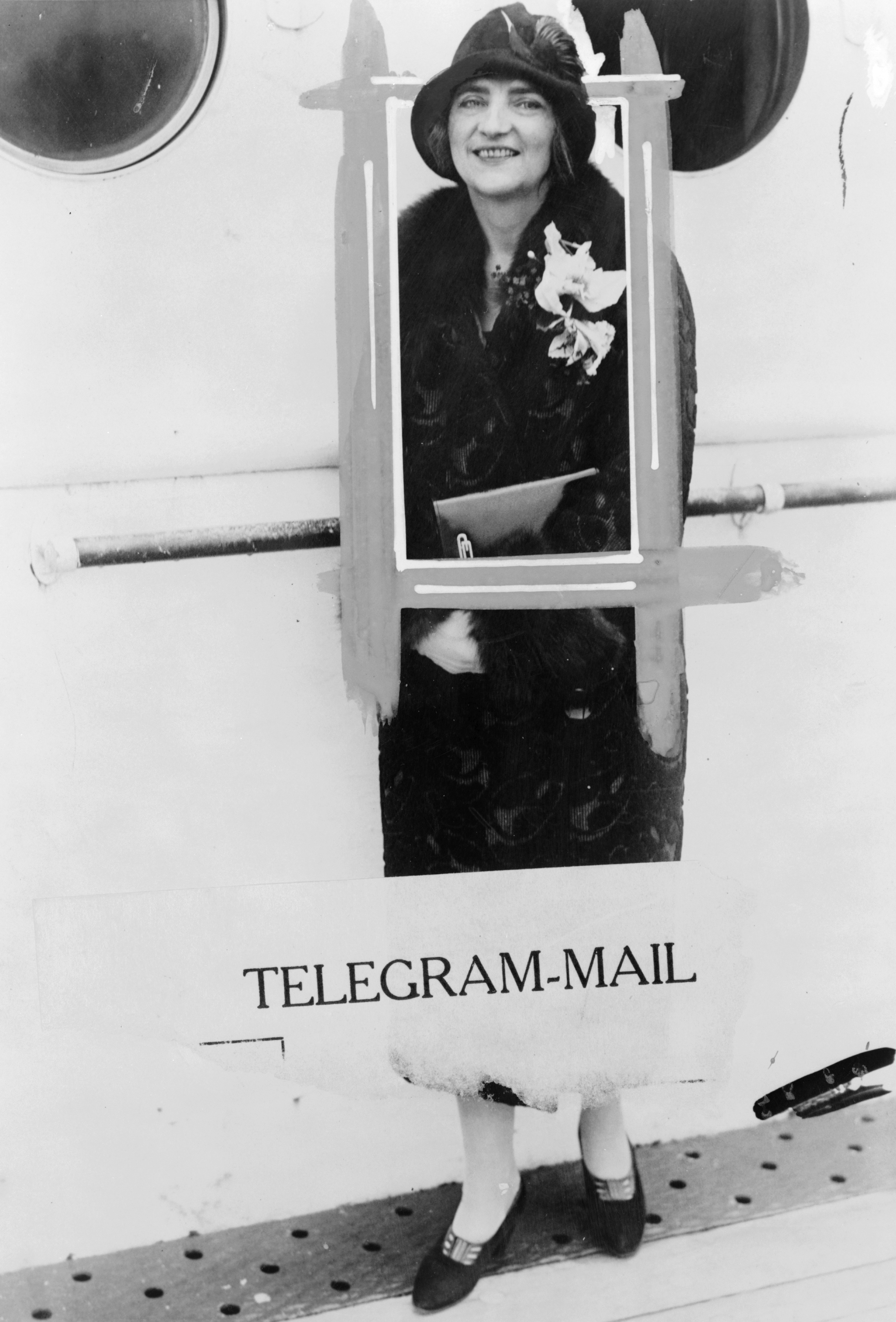
- Drexel in 1925
- Born: c. November 24, 1884 or November 28, 1894 believed to be Darmstadt, Germany
- Died: November 28, 1956; Waterbury, Connecticut, U.S.
- Education: University of Paris
- Occupations: Journalist, propagandist
- Status: Deceased
- Criminal charges: Treason (in absentia), July 26, 1943
- Penalty: Indictment dismissed, April 13, 1948

Constance Drexel (c. November 24, 1884 or c. November 28, 1894 (possible; disputed) – August 28, 1956) was a naturalized United States citizen, and groundbreaking feature writer for U.S. newspapers. She was indicted (but not tried or convicted) for treason in World War II for radio broadcasts from Berlin that extolled Nazi virtues.

She became famous falsely claiming to be an heiress of the famous Drexel family of Philadelphia. Arrested in Vienna and jailed at war's end by American troops, she was released and allowed to return to the United States to live. The U.S. Department of Justice eventually dismissed the treason charges against Drexel after her broadcasts were not deemed "political in nature."

== Family and childhood ==
Public references to Drexel's nation of origin and pedigree were contrary to privately recorded facts. As early as 1915 (in American press reports) and as late as the 1940s (in Nazi broadcasts), she was described as a member of the "famous Drexel family" of Philadelphia, Pennsylvania, an apparent reference to the descendants of Francis Martin Drexel (who founded the Drexel & Company banking empire), including his son Anthony Joseph Drexel (who founded Drexel University in Philadelphia) and his granddaughter Saint Katharine Drexel.

By all accounts, including the one provided by Constance Drexel to the Bureau of Investigation in 1918, she was born in Germany, apparently in the 1880s, many decades after Francis Drexel emigrated from Europe to Philadelphia in 1817. After she began broadcasting from Nazi Germany during wartime, at least one American syndicated columnist speculated that "Drexel" was a pseudonym.

Published information regarding her age and date of birth is also wildly inconsistent. Historian John Carver Edwards has concluded Drexel was born in Darmstadt, Germany on November 28, 1894, to Theodore Drexel, scion of a wealthy family in Frankfurt, Germany, and Zelda Audemar Drexel, daughter of a prominent Swiss watch manufacturer, and was brought to the United States by her father the following year.

However, all five ship manifests in Ellis Island records documenting her re-entry into the Port of New York between 1905 and 1923 give an age commensurate with birth in the 1880s.

A U.S. Department of Justice internal memorandum prepared in 1946 described her birth date as November 24, 1884.

Drexel became a United States citizen upon her father's naturalization in 1899. She reported to the FBI in 1918 that she had a sister named Norma Georgia Drexel, then living in Switzerland. Constance grew up not in Philadelphia, but in Roslindale, Massachusetts, where she attended public schools. "As an adolescent she divided her time between the United States and Europe, attending school in four different countries and honing her skills as a writer", completing her education at the Sorbonne in Paris, France.

== World War I ==
Drexel first received national publicity in early 1915, when American newspapers began to report that "Philadelphia Heiress" Constance Drexel had volunteered briefly as a Red Cross nurse near the front lines in France in the early months of World War I, and reported on her experiences.

Drexel became active nationally and internationally in the International Congress of Women, which met at The Hague in the neutral Netherlands, in April 1915. When she agreed to write dispatches regarding the Congress for American newspapers to publish, her career as a professional journalist began. She soon joined the staff of the Philadelphia Public Ledger. When her stories expanded to include not just her experiences but also her opinions, reactions were mixed. In one such article, she wrote "[one] must realize that an increase in horrors hastens the end of the war; so in the long run it's the most humane thing to have no relief funds or nurses. That's why I left the Red Cross".

A Chicago Herald editorial entitled "Horrible Logic" observed that her statement went far to confirm "that, when once moved to cruelty, women are infinitely more cruel than men." In another column, she opined that "perhaps the greatest curse of war" was "the effect of the loss of men on women and on the race". She explained that the most "harrowing sight in all of war-ridden Europe today" was "the spectacle of the young girls who must always live unmated, robbed of their birthright". "Her writings suggested an enthusiasm for Germany's preparedness campaign, and especially women's role in that effort", according to Edwards. She became involved in the women's suffrage movement, and, in 1916, as a campaigner for the re-election of Woodrow Wilson.

After the United States declared war on the German Empire, she attempted to return to Europe with the announced purpose of visiting her ailing sister in Switzerland, but a complaint from a colleague at the Public Ledger who alleged she had made pro-German comments led to a federal investigation. Her editors attested to her loyalty, but in part because of her German birth and her pacifism, the investigating agent concluded that she should not be permitted to use her passport.

== Covering the Paris Conference, Congress and the League of Nations ==
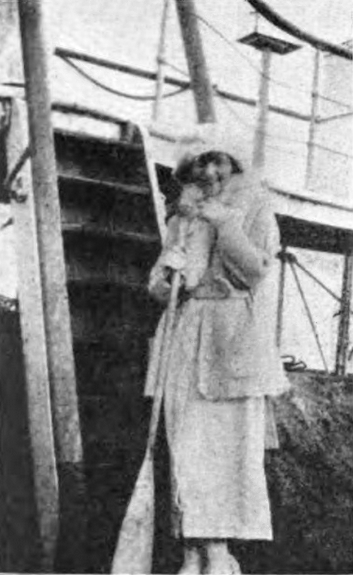
Constance Drexel (1919)

She returned to Europe soon after the end of the war, first to cover the Paris Peace Conference and then to cover and participate in the Inter-Allied Women's Conference of the International Conference of Women and International Woman Suffrage Alliance (which succeeded in obtaining a woman's equality clause in the Covenant of the League of Nations).

Returning to the United States, she covered the suffrage campaign, and when women won the right to vote, she became one of Capitol Hill's few women political correspondents.

Her readership peaked in the 1920s, when her columns on the status of women around the world, and interviews with world leaders, were published in many newspapers, including not only the Public Ledger but also the Chicago Tribune, The New York Times, and members of the McClure Syndicate.

== Interest in Nazi Germany ==
By the early 1930s, Drexel achieved a "growing stature among the press corps and certain political circles," on issues such as international arms control and world peace.

Drexel's interest in these issues did not prevent her from becoming enamored with the rise of Adolf Hitler and the Nazi movement in Germany. Edwards concluded that she liked Hitler because she was impressed by his support for other aspects of her "reform agenda," including a greater role for women, the eradication of a parasitic social elite, welfare legislation for minors, and social hygiene regulatory laws. "Drexel eagerly anticipated visits to the new Reich, and on several of these working holidays the Propaganda Ministry awarded her writing assignments."

In 1938, Drexel became employed in Philadelphia in the Works Progress Administration (WPA) Federal Writers' Project and, later, as an instructor of French on the WPA Education Project, when her writing made at least one journalist question whether she had already become a Nazi propagandist.

== Berlin-based correspondent ==
Drexel returned to Germany in 1939, officially to care for her ailing mother in Wiesbaden, Germany, but travelling at the expense of the German government. In the months leading to Hitler's invasion of Poland in September 1939, Drexel wrote feature stories for American newspapers that were ostensibly about the home life of ordinary Germans, but that consistently reflected positively on the Nazi regime and negatively on its future adversaries.

For example, six weeks before the outbreak of war, she wrote in the Oakland Tribune that the annexation of Austria had prevented the Viennese population from starving; even though this was "[r]endered more difficult by the United States sudden boycott of manufactured goods from the annexed territories ... now that the peculiar genius of the North Germans for organization and efficient administration is in full play under the new regime, this and other problems with which they are harassed are being overcome."

For a few months after World War II began, Drexel wrote more feature articles about life in Germany that appeared in The New York Times. But at that stage of her career, her colleagues in the American press corps had minimal respect for the quality or integrity of her work. One American network hired her at the beginning of the war, but dropped her almost at once.

Drexel had constantly pestered Berlin-based CBS radio correspondent William L. Shirer for a job, but as he later explained, he had considered her "the worst broadcaster I ever heard". In 1940, she began broadcasting on Nazi-controlled shortwave radio channels. She was introduced to listeners as a "world-renowned journalist and a member of the famous Drexel family of Philadelphia."

According to M. Williams Fuller, "[s]ounding like a grand dame with a stuffy nose, she described Germany as a cornucopia – a land of plenty destined for a glorious future. Her broadcasts concluded with titillating accounts of Germany's art exhibits, concerts, food surplus, haute couture and world-class entertainment." Shirer's September 26, 1940 entry in his "Berlin Diary" notes that "the Nazis hire her, as far as I can find out, principally because she's the only woman in town who will sell her American accent to them."

When applying (through Swiss authorities) for an extension of her U.S. passport in November 1942, Drexel stated that "[i]n speaking for the German radio, I am following my own ideas; I am not [a] speaker about political or military matters but reporting cultural activities such as activities in the theatre, music and the film."

Drexel soon fell from grace among her new colleagues, and top Nazis began avoiding her.

Long after the war, it was reported that she had committed a faux pas while attending a reception for Nazi Party leaders. "On being introduced to a beautiful young German woman, Drexel blurted: 'oh, you are the girlfriend of Adolf Hitler!'" As Propaganda Ministry official Inge Doman later testified in the treason trial of Mildred Gillars, known as "Axis Sally", Doman warned Gillars "to keep your distance from that Drexel woman. She's a pest and a crackpot."

== Indictment, arrest, and release ==
On October 1, 1942, President Franklin D. Roosevelt sent a memo to U.S. Attorney General Francis Biddle that stated in part, "There are a number of Americans in Europe who are aiding Hitler et al on the radio. Why should we not proceed to indict them for treason even though we might not be able to try them until after the war?"

A Federal Bureau of Investigation review of excerpts of such broadcasts stated that Drexel was attempting to show that the war had not lowered the morale of the German people in an effort to discourage the American people from continuing with the war effort. In July 1943, the United States Department of Justice filed treason charges against Drexel and seven other United States citizens who had been broadcasting from Axis-controlled radio stations.

On August 17, 1945, over three months after the war in Europe had ended, Drexel was arrested in Vienna by American forces after she revealed her identity to a Stars and Stripes reporter on a walk behind the Vienna City Hall. Wearing an American flag lapel pin, she claimed she had always been a loyal citizen, and had only broadcast on cultural questions. At the time of her arrest, her age was listed as 60 (in one newspaper) and almost 70 (in another).

Drexel was detained for over a year before she was transferred to Ellis Island in New York Harbor, pending an October 1946 hearing by a board of inquiry of the U.S. Immigration and Naturalization Service, on her eligibility to re-enter the United States. On October 3, 1946, the board decided that she had not forfeited her citizenship, and allowed her to re-enter the country.

At the time of her release and re-entry, the United States Department of Justice said that her prosecution on the treason charges was no longer contemplated because lawyers who went to Germany to seek further evidence against her failed to uncover any. An internal Department of Justice memorandum dated June 14, 1946, repeats information from the Office of Strategic Services that she "was stranded in Germany and since she needed money she found a job with the American Propaganda Section of the Reichrundfunk" but that her twice-weekly broadcasts dealt "mainly with women, children, and the beauties of the German landscape." The memo recommended taking no further action against her.

Walter Winchell and others were still urging prosecution and stiff sentences for the Berlin broadcasters. When the charges were formally dropped on April 14, 1948, the investigators explained that none of Drexel's broadcasts was "political in nature".

== Death ==
Drexel died in Waterbury, Connecticut, on August 28, 1956. She collapsed at the home of a cousin before leaving on the first leg of a trip to Geneva, Switzerland, where she intended to move. The obituaries listed her age as 68.
