= 1982 in radio =

List of years in radio	(table)
- … 1972; 1973; 1974; 1975; 1976; 1977; 1978; 1979; 1980; 1981; 1982; 1983; 1984; 1985; 1986; 1987; 1988; 1989; 1990; 1991; 1992 …
- In television 1979 1980 1981 1982 1983 1984 1985 In music 1979 1980 1981 1982 1983 1984 1985 In film 1979 1980 1981 1982 1983 1984 1985
- Art; Archaeology; Architecture; Literature; Music; Philosophy; Science; +...

The year 1982 saw a number of significant events in radio broadcasting history.

== Events ==
- 19 January – It is announced that Watermark Inc., producer of American Top 40 with Casey Kasem, is being sold for approximately $5 million to ABC Radio.
- 14 February – First broadcast of Dick Clark's Rock, Roll & Remember.
- 10 May – After 22 years as a Top 40 music station, WABC in New York City changes to talk radio.
- 23 July – KDKA in Pittsburgh, becomes the first AM station to broadcast in Stereo sound.
- 14 November – KBOX in Dallas, Texas drops its longtime call sign to become KMEZ and simulcast the beautiful music format of their sister station KMEZ-FM.
- 15 November – KOST switches from beautiful music to Adult Contemporary.
- KENR in Dallas, Texas drops country music for news/talk as "The Radio Magazine." By November, the station would flip once again, this time to adult contemporary.
- WBBM-FM Chicago debuts its long-running Top 40 format, beginning as a Hot Hits station called "96 Now!" In September, WHYT Detroit also goes Hot Hits and is also known as "96 Now!"
- The year brings two other significant format changes in Detroit – ailing Top 40 station WDRQ experiences a ratings surge after adjusting its format to urban contemporary that summer, and WABX jettisons its long-running album-oriented/progressive rock format for a New Wave-based CHR format called "Hot Rock."
- KMEL morning host Alex Bennett moves to upstart rival KQAK in August.
- Drake-Chenault syndicates The History of Country Music, a 52-hour country music version of the radio syndicator's successful The History of Rock and Roll. This series, identical to the rock version in features and scope but with country music, is hosted by radio personality Ralph Emery.

== Debuts ==
- Ruth Bennett, mother of KMEL morning host Alex Bennett, begins as host of weekly Kamel Album Countdown on the station, allegedly becoming the world's oldest album-oriented rock disc jockey. A few months later, her son leaves the station.

== Deaths ==
- 5 January – Hans Conried, 66, American actor
- 25 March – Goodman Ace, 83, American humorist, radio writer and comedian, television writer, and magazine columnist.
- 2 May – Hugh Marlowe, 71, American film, television, stage and radio actor
- 27 July – Dan Seymour, 68, American announcer in radio and television
- 16 November – Arthur Askey, 82, English comedian
- 10 December – Freeman Gosden, 83, American actor and comedian

== See also ==
- Radio broadcasting
