= 1974 in radio =

List of years in radio	(table)
- … 1964; 1965; 1966; 1967; 1968; 1969; 1970; 1971; 1972; 1973; 1974; 1975; 1976; 1977; 1978; 1979; 1980; 1981; 1982; 1983; 1984 …
- In music 1971 1972 1973 1974 1975 1976 1977 In television 1971 1972 1973 1974 1975 1976 1977 In film 1971 1972 1973 1974 1975 1976 1977
- Art; Archaeology; Architecture; Literature; Music; Philosophy; Science; +...

The year 1974 in radio involved some significant events.

== Events ==
- April 3 - As tornadoes ravage much of the United States and Canada in what becomes known as the 1974 Super Outbreak, WHAS Louisville, Kentucky air-traffic reporter Dick Gilbert takes to the skies to track a twister as it rakes across the Louisville metro area. He, and the station, receive a Presidential commendation for their storm coverage.
- April 24–5 - Music aired on the radio in Portugal acts as a secret signal to trigger the Carnation Revolution there: at 10:55 p.m. on April 24, Paulo de Carvalho's "E Depois do Adeus" (Portugal's entry in the 1974 Eurovision Song Contest) on Emissores Associados de Lisboa alerts rebel captains and soldiers that the coup is beginning; at 12:20 a.m. on April 25, Rádio Renascença broadcasts "Grândola, Vila Morena", a song by Zeca Afonso, an influential political folk musician and singer who has been banned from Portuguese radio up to this time, signalling the Armed Forces Movement (MFA) to begin the takeover of strategic points of power in the country from 3.00 a.m.

== Debuts ==
- January 6 - CBS Radio Mystery Theater (1974–1982) debuts and is broadcast on 218 stations
- February 19 - BRMB (now Hits Radio Birmingham) begins broadcasting to the Birmingham area
- April 2 - Piccadilly Radio (later Hits Radio Manchester) begins broadcasting to the Manchester area on MW and FM. The mediumwave signal (later Piccadilly Gold, Piccadilly 1152 and Piccadilly Magic 1152) will cease operating in 2021
- July 15 - Metro Radio begins broadcasting to the Newcastle upon Tyne area
- September - American-born music presenter Paul Gambaccini first broadcasts on British radio, initially on BBC Radio 1
- September 30 - Swansea Sound (later The Wave on FM), the first Independent Local Radio station in Wales, begins broadcasting to the Swansea area
- October 1 - Radio Hallam (later Hallam FM) begins broadcasting to the Sheffield area
- October 21 - Radio City (later City FM and Radio City 96.7) begins broadcasting to the Liverpool area

== Closures ==
- August 31 - Radio North Sea International

== Births ==
- February 6 - Aljo Bendijo, Filipino journalist and broadcaster
- February 11 - Alex Jones, American radio/internet show host and conspiracy theorist
- February 22 - Chris Moyles, British radio presenter (BBC Radio 1 etc.)
- March 28 - Scott Mills, British radio DJ
- May 3 - Peter Everitt, Australian rules footballer, later radio host
- June 13 - Katharina Bellowitsch, Austrian broadcast presenter
- June 21 - Natasha Desborough, British radio presenter
- July 14 - David Mitchell, English comic actor
- December 4 - Dan Bongino, American conservative radio host
- December 13 - Sara Cox, British broadcast presenter
- December 24 - Ryan Seacrest, American radio host

== Deaths ==
- January 12 - Helen Claire, American actress on stage and radio, primarily in soap operas (born 1911)
- May 4 - Ludwig Koch, German-born British natural sound recordist (born 1881)
- July 14 - Elizabeth Reller, American actress on stage and radio (born 1913)
- July 28 - Truman Bradley, American radio actor (born 1905)
- November 11 - Jane Ace, American radio actress (born 1897)
- December 26 - Jack Benny, American comedian, vaudeville performer, and radio, television and film actor (born 1894)
