= 1980 in radio =

List of years in radio	(table)
- … 1970; 1971; 1972; 1973; 1974; 1975; 1976; 1977; 1978; 1979; 1980; 1981; 1982; 1983; 1984; 1985; 1986; 1987; 1988; 1989; 1990 …
- In music 1977 1978 1979 1980 1981 1982 1983 In television 1977 1978 1979 1980 1981 1982 1983 In film 1977 1978 1979 1980 1981 1982 1983
- Art; Archaeology; Architecture; Literature; Music; Philosophy; Science; +...

1980 in radio involved some significant events.

== Events ==
- 20 March – The pirate radio ship Radio Caroline sinks.
- April – WDLM, a religious station based in East Moline, Illinois, adds an FM signal at 89.3 MHz. It acts as both a repeater of WDLM's AM signal (at 960 AM, which has been on the air since 1960) and adds additional programming.
- 29 October – President Carter on a visit to Pittsburgh gives a nationally broadcast campaign interview to KDKA-AM of that city.
- 8 December – Former Beatle John Lennon is shot to death outside of his New York City apartment by the killer Mark David Chapman.

== Debuts ==
- Alex Bennett returns to his native San Francisco to host a comedy-oriented morning show for album-oriented rock station KMEL. The show will last for the next 17 years on three different area radio stations.

== Closings ==
- 11 February – Sears Radio Theater ends its run on CBS. Episodes are rebroadcast later in 1980 on Mutual as Mutual Radio Theater.

== Births ==
- 20 July – Énora Malagré, French broadcast presenter
- 9 October – Sarah X Dylan, broadcast personality in Portland, Oregon, United States, producer of The Rick Emerson Show on KUFO
- 4 November – Laura Stylez, American radio personality

== Deaths ==
- 7 January – Irene Beasley, American singer and master of ceremonies best known for her work on old-time radio (born 1904).
- 29 January – Jimmy Durante, American singer, pianist, comedian and actor (born 1893).
- 1 February – Jack Bailey, American actor and daytime game show host (born 1907).
- 4 February – Art Ballinger, American actor, announcer and commercial spokesman (born 1898).
- 11 April – Florence Lake, American actress (born 1904).
- 4 May – Joe "Mr Piano" Henderson, Scottish pianist, composer and broadcaster (born 1920).
- 24 July – Peter Sellers, English actor, comedian and radio personality (born 1925).
- 22 August – Norman Shelley, English radio actor (born 1903).
- 4 October – Charme Allen, American actress and pianist best known for her work on old-time radio (born 1890).
- 20 October – Isobel Barnett, British broadcasting personality (born 1918; suicide).
- 8 December:
  - Charles Parker, English documentary producer (born 1919).
  - John Lennon, English musician, radio personality and member of the Beatles (born 1940; shot).

== See also ==
- Radio broadcasting
