= 1965 in radio =

List of years in radio	(table)
- … 1955; 1956; 1957; 1958; 1959; 1960; 1961; 1962; 1963; 1964; 1965; 1966; 1967; 1968; 1969; 1970; 1971; 1972; 1973; 1974; 1975 …
- In television 1962 1963 1964 1965 1966 1967 1968 In music 1962 1963 1964 1965 1966 1967 1968 In film 1962 1963 1964 1965 1966 1967 1968
- Art; Archaeology; Architecture; Literature; Music; Philosophy; Science; +...

The year 1965 saw a number of significant events in radio broadcasting.

== Events ==
- 19 April: WINS (AM) in New York switches from Top 40 to all-news, with the slogan "You give us 22 minutes, we'll give you the world."
- 19 June: After a multi-year courtroom battle which involved accusations of extortion, the FCC reversed a 1956 station ownership trade between Westinghouse Broadcasting and NBC. Westinghouse reclaimed their original Philadelphia stations, while NBC was ordered to take over their former owned-and-operated stations in Cleveland. The KYW call letters originally went from Philadelphia to Cleveland in 1956, and back to Philadelphia with the reversal, with NBC renaming the Cleveland stations WKYC AM/FM/TV.
- 18 August: Marlene Dietrich appears in "The Child" for BBC radio.
- 21 September: KYW (AM), shortly after relocating back to Philadelphia, institutes an all-news format patterned after WINS (AM).
- 11 October: The Dutch popular-music channel Hilversum 3 (now 3FM) begins broadcasting.
- 12 December: New owner Westchester Broadcasting changes the call letters of WDOK (AM) in Cleveland to WIXY, installing a Top 40 format (today known as WCCR). Their FM sister station retains the WDOK calls and beautiful music format.

=== Unknown Dates ===
- KOFM signed on air in Oklahoma City with a Beautiful Music format.

== Debuts ==
- 16 May: Cross Country Checkup debuts on CBC Radio
- 4 October: Long-running lunchtime news and current affairs programme The World at One begins on the BBC Home Service (now BBC Radio 4).

== Deaths ==
- 20 January: Alan Freed, 47, American disc jockey.
- 27 April: Edward R. Murrow, 57, American news broadcaster.
- 22 May: Christopher Stone, 82, pioneering English disc jockey.
- 13 December: M. R. DeHaan, 74, American Bible teacher, pastor, author and physician, founder of Radio Bible Class.
