= 1981 in radio =

List of years in radio	(table)
- … 1971; 1972; 1973; 1974; 1975; 1976; 1977; 1978; 1979; 1980; 1981; 1982; 1983; 1984; 1985; 1986; 1987; 1988; 1989; 1990; 1991 …
- In music 1978 1979 1980 1981 1982 1983 1984 In television 1978 1979 1980 1981 1982 1983 1984 In film 1978 1979 1980 1981 1982 1983 1984
- Art; Archaeology; Architecture; Literature; Music; Philosophy; Science; +...

The year 1981 in radio involved some significant events.

== Debuts ==
- March – KWNT (1580 AM) of Davenport, Iowa, switches from its longtime country music format – which it had held since the 1950s, including under its previous call sign KFMA – to a golden oldies format, emphasizing music of the 1930s through early 1950s. It is the first in a series of format switches at the frequency over the next 19 years – formats ranged from oldies to soul to black gospel – all of them unsuccessful.
- March 1 - DJ Larry Monroe signs on at Austin's NPR station KUT and stays for 29 years.
- March 30 – Radio stations across America interrupt regular programming following an assassination attempt against President Ronald Reagan outside the Hilton Hotel in Washington, D.C.
- April 12 – WJOI/Pittsburgh flipped from beautiful music to Top 40, branded as "B94", and adopted the new call letters "WBZZ." That fall, WWJ-FM, a beautiful music station in Detroit, picks up the WJOI calls.
- June 1 – CJCB-FM Sydney, Nova Scotia flips from Easy Listening to Country. Along with the format change, the station changes its call letters to CKPE-FM.
- September 22 – WCAU-FM in Philadelphia debuts a new Hot Hits format called "98 Now!" which sweeps the local ratings and inspires parent company CBS to look at converting its other FM stations to similar formats.
- October – "The Weekly Country Music Countdown," a three-hour weekly countdown program featuring the top 30 country hits of the week as reported by Radio & Records magazine. Hosted by radio personality Chris Charles, the show is the first successful rival to "American Country Countdown."

== Births ==
- July 1 – Clemency Burton-Hill, English classical music presenter

== Deaths ==
- February 10 – Leonard Plugge, English commercial radio promoter and politician (b. 1889)
- March 10 – Bob Elson, American "pioneer in broadcast journalism" best known for his broadcasting of baseball games of the Chicago Cubs and Chicago White Sox (b. 1904)
