= 1963 in radio =

| List of years in radio | (table) |
- … 1953; 1954; 1955; 1956; 1957; 1958; 1959; 1960; 1961; 1962; 1963; 1964; 1965; 1966; 1967; 1968; 1969; 1970; 1971; 1972; 1973 …
- In television 1960 1961 1962 1963 1964 1965 1966 In music 1960 1961 1962 1963 1964 1965 1966 In film 1960 1961 1962 1963 1964 1965 1966
- Art; Archaeology; Architecture; Literature; Music; Philosophy; Science; +...

The year 1963 saw a number of significant happenings in radio broadcasting history.

== Events ==
- 28 August – Martin Luther King Jr. delivers his "I Have a Dream" speech which is broadcast over the radio.
- 22 November – On the ABC Radio network in the United States, newscaster Don Gardiner interrupts the song "Hooray for Hollywood" by Doris Day to announce that shots have been fired at the motorcade of President John Fitzgerald Kennedy in Dallas, Texas. This is the first national broadcast bulletin of the news of the shooting. Following Kennedy's death, many radio and TV stations suspend their normal programming for continuous news coverage through November 25, the day of Kennedy's funeral.
- 8 December – Radiodiffusion-Télévision Française renames its radio channels: RTF Inter, RTF Promotion, and RTF Haute Fidélité become, respectively, France Inter, France Culture, and France Musique.
- 25 December – Turkish Cypriot Bayrak Radio begins transmitting in Cyprus after Turkish Cypriots are forcibly excluded from the Cyprus Broadcasting Corporation.
- Los Angeles station KLAC is purchased by Metromedia.
- American automobile companies – including General Motors, Chrysler Corporation and Ford Motor Company – expand the availability of FM-compatible radios as optional equipment on most of their full-sized lines. By the mid-1960s, most mid-sized lines would also have AM-FM radios listed as an option.

== Debuts ==
- 1 October – KDWA radio in Hastings, Minnesota signs on for the first time as a community talk radio station.
- 31 October – Detroit gets a new Top 40 radio station as WKNR-AM, "Keener 13," is born. Within months, the former WKMH overcomes a poor signal to become the number one station in the market, and "Keener" is called the "miracle baby" of the industry by record reporter Bill Gavin.
- 7 November – WGEN-AM signs on the air at 1500 AM in Geneseo, Illinois.
- Undated – WSLA signs on in 1963 as WBGS. Originally, the station Was known as WSDL.

== Closings ==
- 21 March – Breakfast with Dorothy and Dick ends its run on WOR.

== Births ==
- 23 May — Gregg Hughes, American co-host of Opie with Jim Norton, formerly of Opie and Anthony.
- 26 June – Michael Baisden, American author, motivational speaker, radio and television talk show host.
- 20 July – Dino, American DJ, singer, songwriter and music producer.
- 31 July – Chad Brock, American country music artist, former WCW professional wrestler and WQYK-FM morning host.
- 4 September – Louise Doughty, English novelist, radio dramatist and presenter and cultural critic.
- 1 November – David Anderson, African American disc jockey and digital artist.
- 28 November – Armando Iannucci, Scottish broadcast and film writer-producer and presenter.
- 5 December – Doctor Dré, African American radio personality and former MTV VJ.

== Deaths ==
- 2 January – Jack Carson, comic actor, in Encino, California (born 1910)
- 10 March – Lindley Fraser, British academic economist and broadcaster (born 1904)
- 18 March – Peter Eckersley, pioneering British radio engineer (born 1892)
- 4 October – Claire Niesen, actress, in Encino, California (born 1920)
