= 1964 in radio =

List of years in radio	(table)
- … 1954; 1955; 1956; 1957; 1958; 1959; 1960; 1961; 1962; 1963; 1964; 1965; 1966; 1967; 1968; 1969; 1970; 1971; 1972; 1973; 1974 …
- In television 1961 1962 1963 1964 1965 1966 1967 In music 1961 1962 1963 1964 1965 1966 1967 In film 1961 1962 1963 1964 1965 1966 1967
- Art; Archaeology; Architecture; Literature; Music; Philosophy; Science; +...

The year 1964 saw a number of significant events in radio broadcasting history.

== Events ==
- 5 January – Invention for Radio #1: The Dreams is broadcast on BBC's Third Programme.
- 24 January – WBZY 990 AM in Torrington, CT signs off for the last time.
- 27 March – The BBC's Children's Hour (renamed For the Young since April 1961) is broadcast for the last time.
- 28 March – Radio Caroline, a pirate radio station based on a ship anchored in international waters off the English coast, opens as Europe's first all-day English-language pop music station.
- 29 June – Manx Radio, the national commercial radio station for the Isle of Man, begins broadcasting.
- 1 July
  - In Sweden Sveriges Radio launches its third national channel – P3 – as an alternative to commercial pirate radio.
  - In the U.S., the Federal Communications Commission adopts the FM Non-Duplication Rule, prohibiting broadcasters in cities with more than 100,000 people from simulcasting the same programming on their AM and FM stations.
  - WPEA, the oldest high school radio station, belonging to Phillips Exeter Academy, begins broadcasting.
- 16 November – Invention for Radio #2: Amor Dei is broadcast by the BBC.

== Births ==
- 6 January – Colin Cowherd, American sports radio and television personality.
- 24 January – Rob Dibble, former Major League Baseball pitcher and sports radio host.
- 10 February – Glenn Beck, American conservative talk radio and television host.
- 29 February – Lyndon Byers, former NHL player from Canada, WAAF radio host.
- 27 May – Adam Carolla, American comedian, comedy writer, radio and television personality and actor.
- 6 June – Roe Conn, American radio talk show host on WLS in Chicago, Illinois.
- 22 June – Dicky Barrett, American frontman of skacore band The Mighty Mighty Bosstones, radio personality and announcer for Jimmy Kimmel Live!
- 23 June – Jane Garvey, English radio presenter.
- 18 July – Wendy Williams, American radio personality.
- 1 September – Ray D'Arcy, Irish radio and television host
- 14 October – Jim Rome, American radio and TV personality

== Deaths ==
- 1 March – Kathryn Card, 71, American radio, television and film actress.
- 27 August – Gracie Allen, 69, American comedy star of vaudeville, radio, television and film.
- 10 October – Eddie Cantor, 72, American comedian, dancer, singer, actor and songwriter.
- 14 December – William Bendix, 58, Academy Award-nominated American film actor and radio personality.
