= 1983 in radio =

List of years in radio	(table)
- … 1973; 1974; 1975; 1976; 1977; 1978; 1979; 1980; 1981; 1982; 1983; 1984; 1985; 1986; 1987; 1988; 1989; 1990; 1991; 1992; 1993 …
- In television 1980 1981 1982 1983 1984 1985 1986 In music 1980 1981 1982 1983 1984 1985 1986 In film 1980 1981 1982 1983 1984 1985 1986
- Art; Archaeology; Architecture; Literature; Music; Philosophy; Science; +...

The year 1983 in radio involved some significant events.

== Events ==
- January 3 – Following its sale to Sconnix Broadcasting, WLLR of East Moline, Illinois debuts at 101.3 FM and moves its studios to Davenport, Iowa. The station carries over a country format, which had been used by its previous owner under the previous call letters WZZC, which had been in place since 1978. The station continues its steady climb in the Quad-Cities Arbitron ratings and eventually becomes the market's top-rated station.
- July 2 – "Solid Gold Country," a country gold-formatted program, debuts by the United Stations Programming Network. The original format is a three-hour weekly program featuring interviews by a feature artist and song blocks covering various topics and a feature year. Host is Stan Martin, with Ed Salamon as producer and country music journalist Tom Roland as lead writer. This original format will run 18 months, until being reformatted as a daily one-hour program.
- August 2 – WHTZ (Z100) in New York City debuts, soon becoming one of the most influential CHR stations in the US. Z100 has competition in the format from 95.5 WPLJ, which flipped from album-oriented rock to CHR on June 30 of that year, and Z100 literally goes from "worst to first" in the ratings.
- KABG in Cambridge, Minnesota becomes KXLV
- KDWB-FM in Minneapolis, Minnesota flips from album-oriented rock to CHR, a format it still carries today.
- Emmis Broadcasting purchases CHR-formatted WLOL in Minneapolis, Minnesota
- WCCO-FM in Minneapolis, Minnesota flips from adult contemporary to CHR, then back again (as WLTE) later that year.
- December 12 – After 25 years of ownership, Gene Autry sells KSFO 560 AM to King Radio Broadcasting which owned KYA 1260 AM and 93.3 FM.
- December 12 – KYA moves broadcasts solely onto 93.3 FM, leaving 1260 AM (which they owned since 1926 and was sold to Bonneville International) which became a simulcast of KOIT FM, at midnight.

== Debuts ==
- April 15 – American Public Radio is founded (becomes Public Radio International in 1994).
- Joe Castiglione joins the Boston Red Sox broadcast team, teamed with Ken Coleman
- Jam Radio, the University of Hull's student radio station becomes the first student station to obtain a medium wave license.

== Closings ==
- March 16 – The Transmitter Ismaning, the last wooden radio tower in Germany, is demolished.
- KMEL ends its weekly countdown show, hosted by 78-year-old Ruth Bennett, mother of the station's former morning host Alex Bennett.

== Births ==
- July 4 – Amol Rajan, Indian-born British radio presenter
- August 16 – Colin Griffiths, TV presenter and DJ
- August 30 – Anna DeShawn, radio and podcast host
- September 6 – Sam Roberts, radio and podcast host
- October 10 – Alyson Hau, Hong Kong radio DJ

== Deaths ==
- February 4 – Jim Ameche, 67, radio's original Jack Armstrong on Jack Armstrong, the All-American Boy.
- March 16 – Arthur Godfrey, 79, 27-year host of Arthur Godfrey Time on CBS, as well as host of Arthur Godfrey's Talent Scouts (on radio from 1946 to 1956; on TV from 1948 to 1958); one of history's most influential broadcast personalities.
- August 4 – Yuri Levitan, 68, Soviet Russian radio announcer.
- September 11 – Brian Lawrance, 74, Australian bandleader.

== See also ==
- Radio broadcasting
