= KLWJ =

Umatilla, Oregon; United States
- Frequency: 1090 kHz
- Branding: Kingdom Living Radio

Programming
- Format: Defunct; formerly Religious

Ownership
- Owner: Umatilla Broadcasting, Inc.

History
- First air date: 1980

Technical information
- Facility ID: 68743
- Class: D
- Power: 2,500 watts (day-only)
- Transmitter coordinates: 45°52′48″N 119°20′37″W

KLWJ (1090 AM, "Kingdom Living Radio") was a daytime-only radio station licensed to serve Umatilla, Oregon, United States. The station, which began broadcasting in 1980, was owned and operated by Umatilla Broadcasting, Inc.

KLWJ formerly broadcast a religious radio format. The station's final license expired in 2006 and KLWJ was deleted from the FCC database in 2009.

== History ==
This station received its original construction permit from the Federal Communications Commission on February 27, 1979. The new station was assigned the call letters KLWJ by the FCC.

In June 1979, an application was filed to transfer the permit to Umatilla Broadcasting, Inc. The transfer was approved by the FCC on July 9, 1979. KLWJ received its license to cover from the FCC on August 25, 1980.

The station's license was cancelled on June 4, 2009, and the KLWJ call sign was deleted from the FCC database.
