= WSBX =

WSBX may refer to:

- WSBX (FM), a radio station (94.5 FM) licensed to serve Mackinaw City, Michigan, United States
- WSBX (AM), a defunct radio station (1020 AM) formerly licensed to serve Ochlocknee, Georgia, United States
