= KHSN =

Radio station in Coos Bay, Oregon

- Coos Bay, Oregon; United States
- Broadcast area: Coos County, Oregon
- Frequency: 1230 kHz
- Branding: SportsRadio AM1230

Programming
- Format: Sports
- Affiliations: Infinity Sports Network

Ownership
- Owner: W7 Broadcasting, LLC

History
- First air date: March 15, 1928 (as KOOS)
- Former call signs: KOOS (1928–1977)

Technical information
- Licensing authority: FCC
- Facility ID: 4082
- Class: C
- Power: 1,000 watts (unlimited)
- Transmitter coordinates: 43°25′58″N 124°12′30″W

Links
- Public license information: Public file; LMS
- Webcast: Listen live
- Website: khsn1230.com

KHSN (1230 AM, "SportsRadio AM1230") is a radio station licensed to serve Coos Bay, Oregon, United States. The station, which began broadcasting in March 1928, is currently owned by W7 Broadcasting, LLC.

== Programming ==
KHSN broadcasts a sports radio format featuring syndicated programming from CBS Sports Radio.

In addition to its usual sports talk programs, KHSN broadcasts the Major League Baseball games of the Seattle Mariners as a member of the Seattle Mariners Radio Network.

== History ==
This station, one of the first in Oregon, began broadcasting on March 15, 1928, with 50 watts of power on a medium wave frequency of 1370 kHz.

After almost 50 years of broadcasting as KOOS, the station's call sign was changed to KHSN on November 15, 1977.

In August 1983, KOOS Radio, Inc., announced an agreement to sell this station to Bay Radio, Inc. The deal was approved by the FCC on September 12, 1983.

In October 1989, Bay Radio, Inc., reached an agreement to sell KHSN to the Bay Broadcasting Corporation. The deal was approved by the FCC on December 5, 1989, and the transaction was consummated on December 12, 1989.

In February 1999, Bay Broadcasting Corporation agreed to sell this station to New Northwest Broadcasters II, Inc., as part of a multi-station deal valued at a combined $1 million. The deal was approved by the FCC on April 19, 1999, and the transaction was eventually consummated on February 28, 2001. Even before this deal was consummated, as part of an internal corporate reorganization, New Northwest Broadcasters II, Inc., applied to the FCC in October 2000 to transfer the license for this station to New Northwest Broadcasters, LLC. The deal was approved by the FCC on October 26, 2000, and the transaction was consummated on February 28, 2001—the same day as the consummation of the original sale.

In April 2003, New Northwest Broadcasters, LLC, contracted to sell this station to W7 Broadcasting, LLC. The deal was approved by the FCC on August 7, 2003, and the transaction was consummated on October 16, 2003.
