= KKDA (AM) =

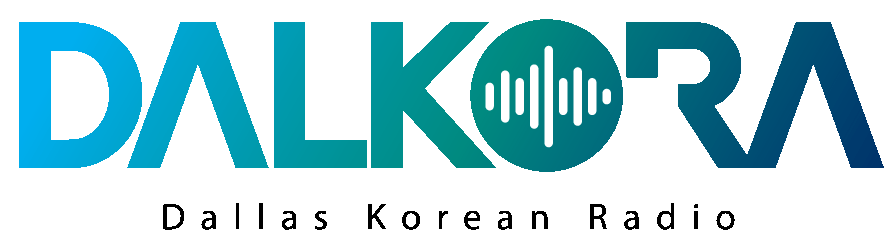
- Grand Prairie, Texas; United States
- Broadcast area: Dallas/Fort Worth Metroplex
- Frequency: 730 kHz
- Branding: Dalkora (Dallas Korean Radio)

Programming
- Language: Korean
- Format: Full service

Ownership
- Owner: Scott Kim & Kimberly Roberts; (SKR Partners LLC)

History
- First air date: 1957 as KBCS
- Former call signs: KBCS (1957–1959); KKSN (1959–1960); KRZY (1960–1962); KPCN (1962–1969)
- Call sign meaning: From its former sister station K104 DAllas; Coincidental backronym of Korea DAllas

Technical information
- Licensing authority: FCC
- Class: B
- Power: 500 watts
- Transmitter coordinates: 32°45′51″N 96°59′27″W

Links
- Public license information: Public file; LMS
- Webcast: Live stream
- Website: dknet730.com

KKDA (730 AM) is an American radio station in the Dallas/Fort Worth area. The station is licensed to serve the community of Grand Prairie, Texas, and is owned by Scott Kim and Kimberly Roberts, through licensee SKR Partners LLC. On January 1, 2013, SKR Partners began operating the station under a local marketing agreement while the sale awaits FCC approval.

Previously, KKDA was operated for many years by Service Broadcasting as a long-time urban oldies format. In addition, it carried UTA Mavericks men's basketball games beginning with the 2012–13 season.

730 AM is a Canadian and Mexican clear-channel frequency.

== History ==
AM 730 in Dallas began operations on August 1, 1957, as Top 40 music station KBCS. After a few years of competing with 1190 KLIF and 1480 KBOX for the Top 40 audience with limited success, the station changed calls to KKSN ("Kissin'") in 1959, evolving into an R&B format over the coming months and taking the new calls KRZY ("Crazy") in 1960.

In 1962, KRZY became KPCN with a country format. KPCN did well until 1480 KBOX changed from Top 40 to country at the start of 1967, as daytimer KPCN was unable to compete against 24-hour KBOX. AM 730 took the KKDA calls in January 1969 and initially aired an easy listening format for a little over a year until returning to an R&B format in April 1970. KKDA has aired programming targeted toward the African-American community of Dallas/Fort Worth ever since.

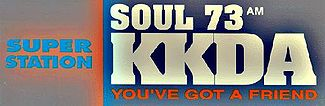
Soul 73 logo used until mid-2012.

The station was acquired by Service Broadcasting Corporation on December 22, 1976. For years, it used the station ident./logo of 'Soul 73', with a mix of soul, R&B, and some gospel, jazz and blues.

KKDA was a daytime-only station until 1990.

In late May 2012, KKDA laid off much of its staff, including Bobby Patterson, Cindy and Roger B. Brown and replaced them with an automated service. Months later, the station tweaked its branding to Soul 730 (Soul Seven-Thirty), while keeping its Urban Oldies format. New DJs were then hired, with veteran broadcaster Willis Johnson continuing with his morning show (5 AM to 9 AM), Lynne Haze running midday drive (9 AM-2 PM), and Warren Brooks taking the afternoon and early evening hours (2 PM-7 PM). Automation continued during offpeak hours. KKDA also then finally got its own website, following the slight re-branding and logo overhaul, including live broadcast.

On December 21, 2012, license holder Service Broadcasting Group LLC contracted to sell KKDA to Scott Kim and Kimberly Roberts, through their licensee SKR Partners LLC, for a reported sale price of $1.9 million. The FCC accepted the application to transfer the broadcast license on December 28, 2012, but as of January 1, 2013, the Commission has taken no further action on the transaction. While the sale is pending, SKR Partners began operating the station with a new Korean language radio format under a local marketing agreement on January 1, 2013.

Despite the switch to Korean language format, the station continued to air UTA Mavericks basketball throughout the remainder of the 2012–13 season. The games were the only English language programming remaining on the station.

On February 22, 2013, Hyman Child's Service Broadcasting Group closed on the sale of Korean KKDA-AM/Grand Prairie-Dallas to SKR Partners LLC for $1,900,000

== Former programming ==
=== The Millie Jackson Show ===
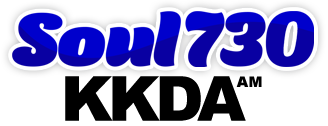
Soul 730 ident used until January 1, 2013.

Soul legend Millie Jackson hosted an afternoon drive show from 3-6 PM weekdays for many years, mixing music with commentary and comedy.Show personalities regularly included S.B. and Trish Hodge with news; and later debuted Katie London with traffic. Featured segments included "The N-News" at 5:30. Her last show was on January 6, 2012.

=== Talking Sports with Roger B. Brown ===
KKDA, also had a sports show that served the African-American community. "Talking Sports with Roger B. Brown." was heard Mondays through Fridays from 6-7 PM, and on Sundays from 6-8 PM. The show had a host of characters like Rufus D. (real name: Rudy Jones), Flipp Da Burd, Eric B. (real name: Eric Sattler) among others. Rufus D. was the entertainment and sports editor on Sundays and also served as co-host. Eric B. also served as co-host. The show was one of the few sports talk shows hosted by black broadcasters. Roger B. Brown had been talking sports in Dallas, Texas for over 18 years prior to being laid off from the station.

== Controversy ==
The sale and format change of KKDA-AM stirred negative criticism from the station's loyal listeners in the African American community. Dallas City Councilman Dwaine Caraway, who regularly listened to Willis Johnson's morning show on KKDA-AM, said: “This is stripping the voice. I have no problems with Koreans at all, but as it relates to African Americans, this man made millions and to say nothing to us at all?", indicating the loss of Soul 730 had silenced a powerful outlet. Service Broadcasting kept its profitable FM Hip-Hop counterpart, KKDA-FM (K104), but that failed to appease the AM station's listeners.

As of April 22, 2013; Willis Johnson's morning show returned on the 411 Reality Radio network online.
