= 1928 in radio =

The year 1928 saw a number of significant events in radio broadcasting history.

== Events ==
- 1 January – Algemeene Vereeniging Radio Omroep begins broadcasting in the Netherlands.
- 2 January – The BBC broadcasts The Daily Service – a 15-minute act of Christian worship – for the first time, from its Savoy Hill studios in London. The programme will still be broadcast five mornings a week on BBC Radio 4 Extra (LW) as of 2026.
- 30 January – First radiotelephone connection between the Netherlands and the United States.
- 25 March – Italian radio broadcasts its first live football commentary: the game is an international match between Italy and Hungary.
- 27 March – KGB (AM) in San Diego begins broadcasting.
- 2 May – KPQ (AM) in Wenatchee, Washington begins broadcasting.
- c. June/July – American radio stations begin broadcasting "musical clock" format breakfast-time programmes, including WCAO in Baltimore, Maryland, followed by WRHF in Washington, D.C.
- 7 July – The French government issues an order limiting the list of private radio stations permitted to continue broadcasting to: Poste Parisien, Radio Agen, Radio Béziers, Radio Bordeaux Sud-Ouest, Radio Juan-les-Pins, Radio LL, Radio Lyon, Radio Mont-de-Marsan, Radio Montpellier, Radio Nîmes, Radio Paris, Radio Toulouse, and Radio Vitus.
- 13 September – KOH-AM in Reno, Nevada, begins broadcasting.
- 28 October – Radio Ljubljana begins regularly programmed transmissions in Yugoslavia.
- 1 November – The first official broadcast in Romanian is aired by the Societatea de Difuziune Radiotelefonică (Radiotelephonic Broadcasting Company) in Bucharest.
- 11 November – General Order 40 is implemented by the United States government; this allows the classification of each allocation in the AM band as either "Local," "Regional," or "Clear." This allows for the creation of clear-channel stations broadcasting at maximum power at night.
  - KXO (AM) in El Centro, California begins broadcasting.
  - WGL (AM) in Fort Wayne, Indiana begins broadcasting.
  - WMT (AM) in Cedar Rapids, Iowa begins broadcasting.
  - WOL (AM) in Washington, D.C. begins broadcasting.
- 20 November – WGH (AM) in Newport News, Virginia begins broadcasting.
- 23 December – NBC sets up its first permanent, coast-to-coast radio network in the United States.

== Debuts ==
- 3 January – The Voice of Firestone (1928–1956), a classical-music program, debuts on NBC.
- 4 January – The Dodge Victory Hour, a variety show, debuts on NBC.
- 19 March – Amos 'n' Andy debuts through the NBC Blue Network, broadcasting from WMAQ-AM, a radio station owned by the Chicago Daily News.
- November – Live broadcast of National Service of Remembrance in Whitehall, London, first made by the BBC.
- 19 November – Happy Station Show (1928–1995), hosted by Eddy Startz from 1928 until 1970.
- 24 December – First broadcast of Festival of Nine Lessons and Carols from King's College Chapel, Cambridge, by the BBC.
- Radio calisthenics (ラジオ体操, rajio taisō), daily exercises, first broadcast on NHK in Japan,

== Endings ==
- 22 April – The Acousticon Hour ends its run on network radio.

== Births ==
- 16 January – Menchu Álvarez del Valle, Spanish radio journalist (died 2021)
- 21 May – Tom Donahue, pioneering American rock and roll radio disc jockey and freeform rock pioneer (died 1975)
- 6 June – R. D. Wingfield, English radio dramatist and detective novelist (died 2007)
- 19 June – Barry Took, English comedy writer and broadcast presenter (died 2002)
- 2 July – John Timpson, English radio news presenter (died 2005)
- 17 August – Willem Duys, Dutch radio/television host (died 2011)
- 17 September – Brian Matthew, English disc jockey (died 2017)
- 20 October – Michael O'Donnell, English physician, journalist, medical campaigner and broadcaster (died 2019)
- 9 November – Wim Bosboom, Dutch radio/television host
