= WSBX (AM) =

Ochlocknee, Georgia; United States
- Broadcast area: Thomasville/Tallahassee
- Frequency: 1020 kHz

Programming
- Format: Defunct

Ownership
- Owner: Georgia Triangle Broadcasting, LLC.; (Doreen A. Blood)

History
- First air date: 1983
- Former call signs: WJEP (1983–2008)

Technical information
- Facility ID: 37449
- Class: D
- Power: 10,000 watts (daytime only)
- Transmitter coordinates: 30°54′0.00″N 83°59′55.00″W

WSBX (1020 AM) is a defunct American radio station. It was licensed to the suburb of Ochlocknee, Georgia and served the Thomasville, Georgia and Tallahassee, Florida areas. It first began broadcasting in 1983 under the call sign WJEP. The station licensee was Doreen A. Blood.

== History ==
WSBX began broadcasting as WJEP in 1983 with a Christian format until Georgia Triangle Broadcasting purchased the station from Lifeline Ministries in 2008. The call sign was changed to WSBX on November 4, 2008, and on December 8, 2008, it changed formats to Hot Talk. Two months later, on February 7, 2009, the format was changed to Active Rock. Again only two months later, on April 7, the format was changed to Rock en Español, then to Spanish talk "Radio El Chongo", before being changed again to modern rock.

As of February 25, 2012, the station was identified by the FCC as licensed but silent, meaning that it was not broadcasting. WSBX was reported by its owners as being for sale. On November 22, 2013, the FCC cancelled the station's license due to it having been silent for more than twelve months.
