= WPEA =

- Exeter, New Hampshire; United States
- Broadcast area: Seacoast Region (New Hampshire)
- Frequency: 90.5 MHz
- Branding: WPEA 90.5 FM

Programming
- Format: Variety

Ownership
- Owner: Trustees of the Phillips Exeter Academy

History
- First air date: 1964
- Call sign meaning: Phillips Exeter Academy

Technical information
- Licensing authority: FCC
- Facility ID: 68250
- Class: A
- ERP: 100 watts
- HAAT: 10 meters (33 ft)
- Transmitter coordinates: 42°58′44.3″N 70°56′58.2″W

Links
- Public license information: Public file; LMS
- Webcast: Listen live; Listen live (via TuneIn)
- Website: www.exeter.edu/community/student-organizations/wpea

WPEA (90.5 FM) is a non-commercial educational radio station licensed to serve Exeter, New Hampshire. The station is owned by the Trustees of the Phillips Exeter Academy. It airs a variety format. The WPEA studios are located in the Elizabeth Phillips Academy Center on the campus of the Phillips Exeter Academy.

WPEA is one of the oldest continuously operated high school radio stations in the United States. The oldest continuously operated high school radio station is AM 1450 KBPS Portland, which was licensed to broadcast by the FCC on March 23, 1923 on March 23rd 1923. The station was assigned the WPEA call letters by the Federal Communications Commission.

== Awards ==
- Marconi College Radio Award, "Most Outstanding High School Radio Station" – 1992
