= Mike Joseph =

British bench press powerlifter

Mike Joseph (born 23 July 1971), known as Bench Press King, is a Bench press Powerlifter and 10 times British, European and World Bench Press Champion and holder of four World Records as well as holding a record in the Guinness Book of World Records for a 24-hour endurance bench press record.

== Early life ==
Joseph was born in Essex in the United Kingdom.

== Career ==
Mike Joseph started competing in powerlifting at the age of 29 and broke the British Record in his first competition. That year he represented England in the World Championships and won his first World Title.

He is a member of the British Drug Free Powerlifting Federation (BDFPA), an affiliate of the World Drug Free Powerlifting Federation, which follows International Olympic Committee and World Anti Doping Association rules, including vigorous drug testing.

In December 2009, Mike appeared on his own show on Sky TV, "The Bench Press King", on the Active Channel.

Joseph claimed nine World Titles before incurring a rotator cuff tear in his shoulder in 2010, which ended required surgery. After a period of rehabilitation and physiotherapy he returned to powerlifting in February 2012, representing Team Great Britain, lifting in the British Championships and breaking the World Record which had stood since 1994. In June 2012, Joseph represented Team Great Britain and won his tenth World Title the World Championships in Autun, France.

== Personal records ==
- World Powerlifting Record @ 82.5 kg
- World Bench Press Records @ 82.5 kg
- World Bench Press Records @ 75 kg
- 24 Hour Bench Press Endurance Record (Guinness Book of Records).
