= Imad Kotbi =

Moroccan disc jockey (born 1978)

Imad Kotbi (Arabic: عماد قطبي) (born June 21, 1978) is a Moroccan radio presenter and a disk jockey. He was born in Casablanca, and is currently working for Casa FM radio station presenting a show called "Ze Kotbi Show".

Kotbi is a Guinness World Record holder after broadcasting during 50 hours non-stop between December 29 at 20h 15 and December 31, 2006, at 12h 15 GMT.
