= Simon Gärdenfors =

Swedish cartoonist

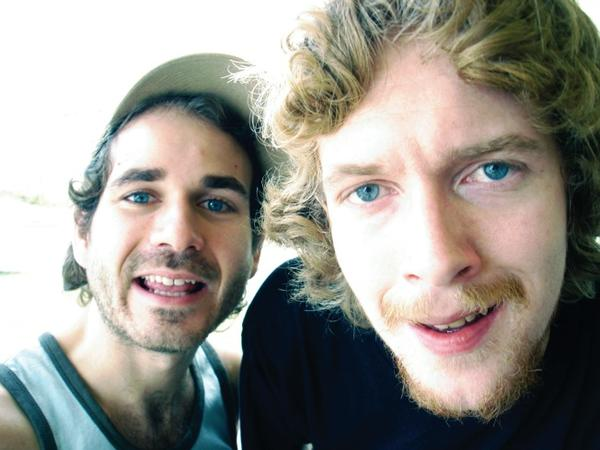
Simon Gärdenfors (left) with Calle Thörn.

Simon Gärdenfors (born 23 March 1978) is a Swedish cartoonist, rapper, television presenter, and radio host.

== Published works ==
- 2002 - Turist (Tourist)
- 2005 - Lura mig! (Fool Me!)
- 2008 - Simons 120 dagar (published in English as The 120 Days of Simon in 2010)
- 2009 - Nybuskis (Neo-Farce)
- 2012 - Död kompis (Dead Friend)
- 2014 - Hobby
