= The Dodge Victory Hour =

The Dodge Victory Hour, one of radio's first variety shows, debuted on NBC in January 1928. The premiere was produced at a cost of $67,600 (about $923,000 in 2013).

The show starred Will Rogers, Paul Whiteman and his orchestra, Fred Stone and Al Jolson in a 47-station coast-to-coast program with Jolson in New Orleans, Stone in Chicago and Whiteman in New York. From his home in Beverly Hills, Will Rogers did a Coolidge imitation, the first time a president was imitated on radio.

Sponsored by Dodge's new Victory Six automobile, the program reached an audience estimated at 35 million, the largest since Charles Lindbergh's return in 1927. The following day, The New York Times headlined: "All America Used As a Radio Studio".

Two months later came a follow-up. The second Dodge Victory Hour was broadcast in March 1928, once again with Hollywood stars and Whiteman's band. To reach an even larger audience, United Artists installed extra speakers in theaters.
