= 1962 in radio =

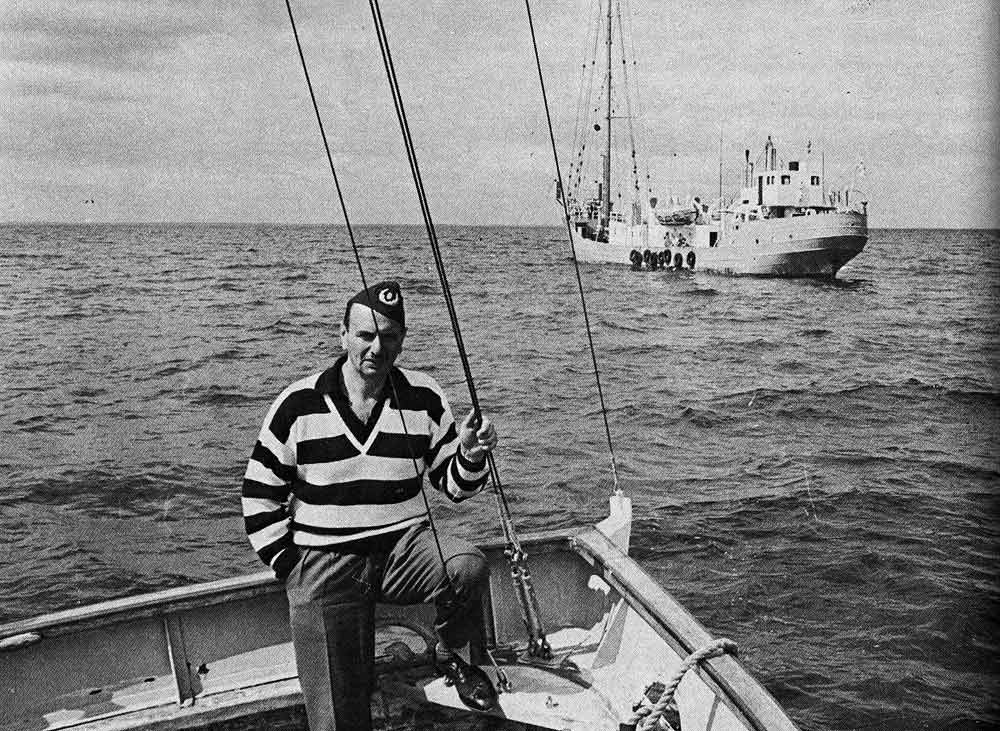
Jack Kotschack in a picture taken on June 30, 1962, when he visited the transmitter ship Bon Jour on Radio Nord's last day of broadcasting.

The year 1962 in radio involved some significant events.

== Events ==
- May 19 – XHDL-FM begins broadcasting on 98.5 FM in Mexico City under the name XELA-FM.
- July – After its first few months on the air with a community format, KHAK (98.1 FM) in Cedar Rapids, Iowa, takes up a country music format at the station, a format that has remained intact to this day.
- July 1 – KRSI-FM in St. Louis Park, Minnesota, signs on the air as KRSI-FM.
- October 2 – KUAC, Fairbanks, first FM Station, begins broadcasting at 104.7, with the morning Show AM on October 3.
- December – KLOU 103.3 in St. Louis, Missouri, begins broadcasting as KMOX-FM.
- December 15 – Storm over the North Sea: Belgian pirate radio station Radio Uylenspiegel is knocked off the airwaves, never to operate again.

=== No dates ===
- In Sweden, Sveriges Radio begins trial broadcasts in preparation for the establishment of a third national channel – P3 – as an alternative to commercial pirate radio.
- KRZY in Dallas, Texas, becomes KPCN and flips to a country music format.

== Debuts ==
- October 13 – Svensktoppen, a weekly record chart, is launched by Sveriges Radio.
- Bud Ballou begins his radio career as disc jockey at WOLF.

== Closings ==
- February 1 - My True Story ends its run on network radio (Mutual).
- September 30 – CBS broadcasts the final episodes of Suspense and Yours Truly, Johnny Dollar, marking what some consider the end of the Golden Age of Radio.

== Births ==
- June 10 – Akie Abe, Japanese radio DJ
- September 20 – Jim Al-Khalili, Iraqi-born British science broadcaster
- October 12 – Chris Botti, American jazz trumpeter, composer and radio host
- October 28 – Dan "Elvis" Lay, American radio personality, co-host of The Dog House
- November 6 – Frank DeCaro, American writer, performer and SIRIUS OutQ radio show host
- November 22 – Steve DeOssie, American sportscaster, former NFL player
- December 12 – Mike Golic, American football player and radio host

== Deaths ==
- February 17 – Joseph Kearns, 55, American radio and television actor
- October 2 – Frank Lovejoy, 50, American radio and television actor
- December 7 – Kirsten Flagstad, 67, Norwegian soprano whose nationwide personal appeals to radio listeners during Saturday matinee intermissions raised money for the Metropolitan Opera.
- December 31 – Bella Alten, 85, Polish-born operatic soprano who gave concerts and radio broadcasts until 1936
