= 1978 in radio =

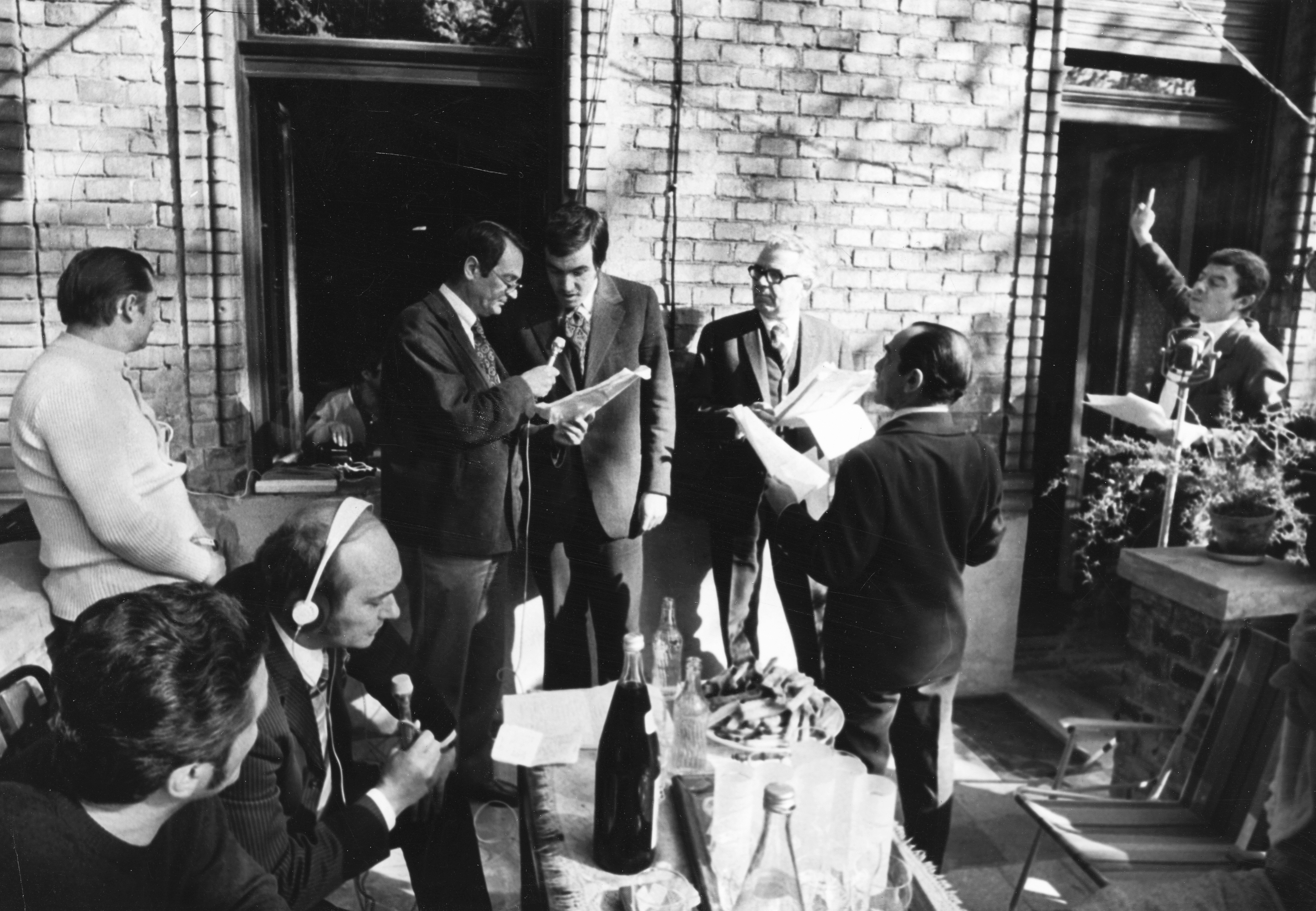

The year 1978 saw a number of significant events in radio broadcasting.

== Events ==
- February 8 – Proceedings of the United States Senate are broadcast on radio for the first time.
- April 8 – Proceedings of the Parliament of the United Kingdom are broadcast on radio regularly for the first time.
- May 6 – Bob Kingsley, producer of the syndicated "American Country Countdown," takes over as host. He replaces Don Bowman, who had hosted for the first 4½ years. Kingsley will helm the program for 27 years.
- July – WHTT of Moline, Illinois but with studios in Davenport, Iowa switches call letters to WXLP and changes its format from country to album-oriented rock. The station adopts the nickname "97X."
- September 18 – In television, American situation comedy WKRP in Cincinnati (1978–1982), featuring the misadventures of the staff of a struggling radio station in Cincinnati, Ohio.
- October 7 – "American Top 40" expands from three to four hours. Several new features are added to the program, which is reaching its peak in popularity.

=== No dates ===
- Likely fall – WEMO (101.3 FM) of East Moline, Illinois switches its adult contemporary/MOR format to country music, and changes its call letters to WZZC. The new station, an ancestor to WLLR, stabilizes an FM country music format, which – except for a brief run in 1977-1978 on WHTT-FM (96.9 FM) – had been absent from the Quad Cities market for more than five years.
- Bill Ballance leaves KGBS for KFMB in San Diego, where he is to remain for fifteen years.

== Debuts ==
- 8 March – The first episode of The Hitchhiker's Guide to the Galaxy - the radio series later to be turned into a book, a television programme, a game, and a film - is broadcast on BBC Radio 4.
- 3 July – The radio play Pearl by John Arden is first performed.
- 24 December – In Sweden, pirate radio station Radio FM in Stockholm goes on air.

== Closings ==
- 29 January – Adventure Theater (a children's program, not to be confused with Adventure Theater, a 1956 anthology series on NBC) ends its run on network radio.
- 31 December – In Sweden, Frukostklubben ends.

== Births ==
- March 23 – Simon Gärdenfors, Swedish cartoonist and radio host
- May 18 – Carolina Bermudez, radio personality on the syndicated Elvis Duran and the Morning Zoo program originating from New York on WHTZ (Z100)
- June 8 – Imad Kotbi, Moroccan radio presenter and DJ
- June 29 – Charlamagne tha God, American radio personality on The Breakfast Club
- July 18 – Annie Mac(Manus), Irish-born radio DJ
- October 31 – Ella McSweeney, Irish broadcast producer and journalist
- December 25 – Paula Seling, Romanian singer and radio DJ

== Deaths ==
- January 19 – Donald McCullough, British broadcaster (b. 1901)
- March 27 – Wilfred Pickles, English radio presenter (b. 1904)
- April 28 – Walter Fischer, Austrian medical doctor, journalist, radio broadcaster, translator, poet, anti-fascist resistance fighter and Communist Party official (b. 1901)
- June 29 – Bob Crane, American actor, drummer, radio host and DJ (b. 1928)
