= Bud Ballou =

American disc jockey and radio personality

Dudley "Bud" Ballou (December 11, 1942 – April 15, 1977) was an American disc jockey and radio personality active for fifteen years on several commercial radio stations during the 1960s and 1970s.

Ballou was born and raised in Liverpool, New York, a suburb of Syracuse. His father was Leslie G. Ballou, and he had a brother, James.

After a stint as an electronics technician at Western Electric in Syracuse, Ballou began his radio career as disc jockey at WOLF in 1962. With Ballou's help WOLF enjoyed a majority share of Syracuse radio listeners in 1963 and 1964. In 1964 he moved to WNDR radio. He also hosted a black-and-white television version of "The Bud Ballou Show" on WNYS-TV, channel 9, originating from the station's Shoppingtown studios in DeWitt, which premiered on February 8, 1965.

Ballou left the Syracuse area for KBTR in Denver, Colorado, in 1966, and in 1967 he moved to WKBW in Buffalo, New York, to replace Joey Reynolds. As an April Fool's Day stunt in 1967, Ballou hosted one shift on WPOP, trading places with another DJ for that day only.

Ballou moved to the Boston area in 1968 appearing on WMEX until 1971 and then moving to WVBF in Framingham (serving the Boston market) until 1976. During this period he was an avid hockey fan who sometimes watched games even while broadcasting.

Ballou died April 15, 1977, at age 34 of a massive stroke at Leonard Morse Hospital in South Natick. He is buried in Fulton, New York. He was married to the former Kasia Rondomanski of Fulton and had four children.

Confusingly, a different ex-WOLF disc jockey from the Syracuse area named Howie Castle used "Bud Ballou" as his professional name while working for Radio Caroline in Europe in late-1967 and early-1968. As of 2002, Castle was the news anchor at KOGO in San Diego.
