= 1977 in radio =

In the year 1977, significant events in radio broadcasting included the President of the United States participating in a call-in radio program.

== Events ==
- January – WRSQ-FM (104.9) signs on the air in Geneseo, Illinois, United States, as a sister station to WGEN-AM (1500 AM). The station's first call letters are short-lived, as the station will quickly adopt the callsign WGEN-FM. The initial format is country music with a community focus.
- February 18 – Belgischer Rundfunk (BRF) is founded and takes over responsibility for public-service radio broadcasting in the German language in Belgium.
- March 5 - President Jimmy Carter participates with Walter Cronkite in the Dial-a-President radio program on CBS.
- May 12 - WTIC-FM in Hartford, Connecticut switches from classical music to a new Top 40 format designed by consultant Mike Joseph. This successful new approach will later be termed Hot Hits.
- July 1 - CKO (a Canadian all news radio network) begins broadcasting.
- August 16 - Radio and television stations nationwide interrupt regular programming to report the death of Elvis Presley.
- September 1 -- Dave Lingafelt begins airing "The Whacky Wake Up Crew" on WNNC-AM in Newton, North Carolina. He has been on the air for more than 35 years and has since purchased another AM station as well as 95.7 WXRC "The Ride."

=== No dates ===
- KSTP-FM in St. Paul, Minnesota adopts its long-running soft rock format.

== Debuts ==
- 5 February: Adventure Theater (a children's program, not to be confused with Adventure Theater, a 1956 anthology series on NBC) debuts on CBS.

== Closings ==
- 29 May: NBC Radio's all-news "News and Information Service" ceases operations, citing a low number of affiliates. Most stations switch to different formats, but KQV in Pittsburgh launched a locally based production for its all-news format, which it maintains to the present day.

== Births ==
- May 17 - Ben Whitehead, English actor and voice actor. He voiced a few of the characters in the BBC Radio comedy-drama play Churchill's Bust in 2025
- September 3 - DJ Envy, American DJ and host of The Breakfast Club
- November - Heidi Cortez, American model, writer, and radio host

== Deaths ==
- February 17 - Quincy Howe, 76, American radio broadcast journalist
- April 15 - Bud Ballou, 34, American radio disc jockey
- May 2 - Sid Collins, 55, American broadcaster best known as the radio voice of the Indianapolis 500 on the Indianapolis Motor Speedway Radio Network from 1952 to 1976
- June 14 - Alan Reed, 70, American actor
- October 14 - Bing Crosby, 74, American singer, actor and early radio personality
- November 8 - Ted Ray, 71, English comedian
