= 1987 in radio =

The year 1987 in radio involved some significant events.

== Events ==
- January 1 — WBEA-FM in Elyria, Ohio (Cleveland market) drops the "B107" top 40 format to become the second affiliate for the Satellite Music Network's "Z Rock" service, with new WCZR call letters.
- February 14 — Dubbed the "Valentine's Day Massacre," KMET-FM in Los Angeles switches formats to new-age music, with no disc jockeys, as KTWV. KMET's entire airstaff is dismissed with the move.
- March 30 -- Infinity Broadcasting buys KVIL-AM-FM Dallas from Sconnix Broadcasting. The sale price was $82 million, the largest amount of money for an AM-FM combo up to that date.
- July 1 — The first all-sports radio station, WFAN 1050 AM in New York, debuts at 3:00 p.m. It replaces country-formatted WHN, and inherits the rights to New York Mets play-by-play.
- July 20 — Westwood One acquires the assets of the NBC Radio Network, The Source and NBC Talknet in a $50 million deal, which was consummated that August 25. The sale was initiated by General Electric's 1986 purchase of RCA (primarily for the NBC television network) and did not include the seven NBC Radio owned-and-operated stations.
- August 4 — The Federal Communications Commission rescinds the Fairness Doctrine, which had required radio and television stations to "fairly" present controversial issues.
- October 31 — DWNU begins broadcasting operations. This station became the Philippines' one and only home for new rock as NU 107.
- November 9 — Hot Hits WCAU-FM Philadelphia flips from CHR to Oldies as WOGL.
- November 15 — WCZR in Elyria, Ohio (Cleveland market) drops "Z Rock" for new-age music as WNWV "The Wave." It is patterned directly after KTWV.

== Debuts ==
- February 15 - Billboard debuts the first "Crossover" radio chart, which was published weekly until 1990. This chart would become the predecessor to the Rhythmic Contemporary chart that would debut in 1992.
- October 31 - NU 107 begins broadcast in Pasig, Philippines.

== Births ==
- April 22 - Brandon Tatum, conservative radio host and youtuber

== Deaths ==
- January 9 - Arthur Lake, American actor known best for bringing Dagwood Bumstead, the bumbling husband of Blondie, to life in film, radio and television (born 1905)
- February 1 - Lee Aubrey "Speed" Riggs, American tobacco auctioneer who for more than three decades appeared on radio for the American Tobacco Company as the voice of Lucky Strike cigarettes.
- March 13 - Fela Sowande, Nigerian-born musician (born 1905)
- April 19 - Hugh Brannum, American actor and musician (born 1910)
- September 12 - Jessie Young, American radio commentator (born 1900)
- November 17 - Ireene Wicker, American singer and actress (born 1905)
