= 1960 in radio =

The year 1960 saw a number of significant happenings in radio broadcasting history.

== Events ==
- 25 January – The National Association of Broadcasters in Washington, D.C. reacts to the payola scandal by threatening fines for any disc jockeys who accepted money for playing particular records.
- 8 February – Congressional investigations begin into payola in the radio and record industries.
- 29 February – The radio program At Your Service debuts on St. Louis radio station KMOX. The program is believed to be the first locally produced radio talk show, and helps launch the talk radio format in the US.
- 26 September – Richard Nixon and John F. Kennedy participate in the first ever presidential debate. The debate is broadcast on both radio and television with most radio listeners preferring Nixon's performance and TV viewers favoring Kennedy's.
- (date unknown) – KFMA (1580 AM) of Davenport, Iowa switches its call letters to KWNT. By now, the format is full-time country music and the station is the only one in the Quad Cities market to devote itself exclusively to the genre.

== Debuts ==
- 15 May – WFVA-FM debuts.
- 19 June – The Associated Broadcasting Corporation (later TV5 Network, Inc.) is the founded in the Philippines makes the first radio station through DZMT begins broadcasting from its first studios in Pasong Tamo in Makati.

== Endings ==
- 1 January – The NBC Radio Theater ends its run on network radio (NBC).
- 23 March – The Second Mrs. Burton ends its run on network radio (CBS).
- 27 August – The Louisiana Hayride puts on its final show.
- 25 November – The long-running serial, Ma Perkins, airs its last episode on the CBS radio network.

== Births ==
- 3 January – Liz Kershaw, UK radio presenter
- 13 February – Delilah, nationally syndicated US love-song request-and-dedication host
- 10 March – Anne MacKenzie, Scottish broadcast journalist
- 1 August – Chuck D, American rapper, composer, actor, author, radio personality and producer
- 17 September – Steve Scully, American broadcast journalist
