= 1958 in radio =

The year 1958 saw a number of significant events in radio broadcasting history.

== Events ==
- 24 February – In Cuba, Radio Rebelde, the radio station of Fidel Castro's rebels, begins broadcasting from Sierra Maestra.
- 1 April – The BBC Radiophonic Workshop is established.
- 15 April – In New York City, Les Keiter, sports director of WINS (AM), begins coverage of San Francisco Giants games, just months after the team has moved out of New York City to the West Coast. His "live-action" commentaries are so vivid that many listeners never realize that Les is merely staging a re-creation of the games from Western Union telegraph reports received in WINS' New York studios (a throwback to 1930s radio coverage of baseball games) and never sets foot in Seals Stadium. WINS will carry Giants games in the same manner next year.
- 2 July – The first radio ballad, The Ballad of John Axon, is broadcast on the BBC Home Service.
- 8 July – Gordon McLendon of Dallas buys WGRC Louisville, converts it to Top 40 legend WAKY.
- 14 July – John F. Box Jr., president of the Balaban group, buys KGKO and changes the station's call letters to KBOX, adopting a Top 40 format to compete with Gordon McLendon's top-rated 1190 KLIF.

== Debuts ==
- January – Pete Myers, with his frenetic, rapid-fire "Mad Daddy" persona, delivered entirely in rhyme, debuts on WJW (AM) in Cleveland (today WKNR). His evening show has a brief run (he leaves WJW in May). After a 90-day non-compete clause is enforced, Myers joins cross-town WHK, coining phrases that are still uttered to this day, such as "wavy gravy" and "mellow jello".
- 4 March – WDCR/1340-Hanover, New Hampshire (Dartmouth College Radio) begins broadcasting at 21:00 Eastern Standard Time.
- 26 August – KMAQ of Maquoketa, Iowa signs on the air at 1320 AM, with Dennis Voy as one of the main personalities. The station operates as a strictly sunrise to sunset operation at a power of 500 watts.
- 23 November – "Have Gun, Will Travel", one of the last radio dramas featuring continuing characters, debuts on the CBS Radio Network.
- The Australian Broadcasting Corporation debuts The Idiot Weekly scripted by and staffing Spike Milligan.

== Closings ==
- 3 January – Wendy Warren and the News ends its run on network radio (CBS).
- 9 January – X Minus One ends its run on network radio (NBC).
- 25 January – The National Farm and Home Hour ends its run on network radio (NBC).

== Births ==
- 29 January – Linda Smith, English comedian (died 2006)
- 3 May – Sandi Toksvig, Danish-born British comic performer
- 14 May – Jan Ravens, English actress and impressionist
- 23 May – Mitch Albom, American author and radio personality
- 29 June – Jeff Coopwood, American actor, broadcaster and singer
- 27 July – Vincenzo Nicoli, English actor
- 27 August – Normand Brathwaite, Québécois television and radio presenter
- 29 August – Michael Jackson, American singer and songwriter
- 6 September – Jeff Foxworthy, American comedian, actor, author, and radio and television personality
- 21 September – Simon Mayo, British radio presenter
- 26 September – Dan Foster, American radio personality (died 2020)
- 23 October – Michael Dyson, African American writer, professor and radio talk show host
- 11 December – Pete Mitchell, English radio presenter (died 2020)

== Deaths ==
- 18 May – Elmer Davis, 68, American news reporter, author, and a Peabody Award recipient
