= 1957 in radio =

The year 1957 saw a number of significant events in radio broadcasting history.

== Events ==
- 6 February – Establishment of the Faroese broadcasting corporation, Útvarp Føroya.
- 12 February – KPEG in Spokane, Washington, goes on air with an all-woman announcing team, who all use the first name Peg on air.
- KNOC in Dallas, Texas becomes a full-time rhythm and blues station, the first such in the US broadcasting market.
- WCOW in St. Paul, Minnesota becomes WISK.

== Debuts ==
- 14 January – The Affairs of Dr. Gentry debuts on NBC.
- 8 April – The popular midday programme Autofahrer unterwegs begins its 42-year-long run on Österreich-Regional in Austria.
- 28 October – Today first broadcast as a daily early-morning topical radio show on the BBC Home Service; it will still be running 60 years later.
- KBCS in Dallas, Texas signs on with a Top 40 format.
- KBZY in Salem, Oregon signs on with a Top 40 format.

== Closings ==
- 27 February – The Crime Files of Flamond ends its run on network radio (Mutual).
- 7 March - Official Detective ends its run on network radio (Mutual)..
- 13 April - The Jane Pickens Show ends its run on network radio (NBC).
- 30 July – Hilltop House ends its run on network radio (NBC).
- 22 September – CBS Radio Workshop ends its run on network radio (CBS).
- 27 December – Strike It Rich ends its run on network radio (NBC).

== Births ==
- 17 January – Steve Harvey, African American comedian, television host, radio personality, actor and author.
- 16 March – Garry Cobb, American National Football League player, later radio personality on WIP in Philadelphia, Pennsylvania.
- 18 May – Rob Bartlett, American comedian, actor and writer best known for Imus in the Morning.
- 9 July – Paul Merton, né Martin, English comic performer and broadcast panel show participant.
- 24 August – Stephen Fry, English actor and broadcast panel show participant.
- 22 September – Ted Williams, American radio personality on WWCD.
- 24 November – Edward Stourton, English radio news presenter.
- 7 December – Winifred Robinson, English radio presenter.
- Garry Richardson, English radio sports presenter.

== Deaths ==
- 2 May – Herb Butterfield, 61, American radio and television actor.
