= Alex Bennett (broadcaster) =

American talk radio host (born 1939)

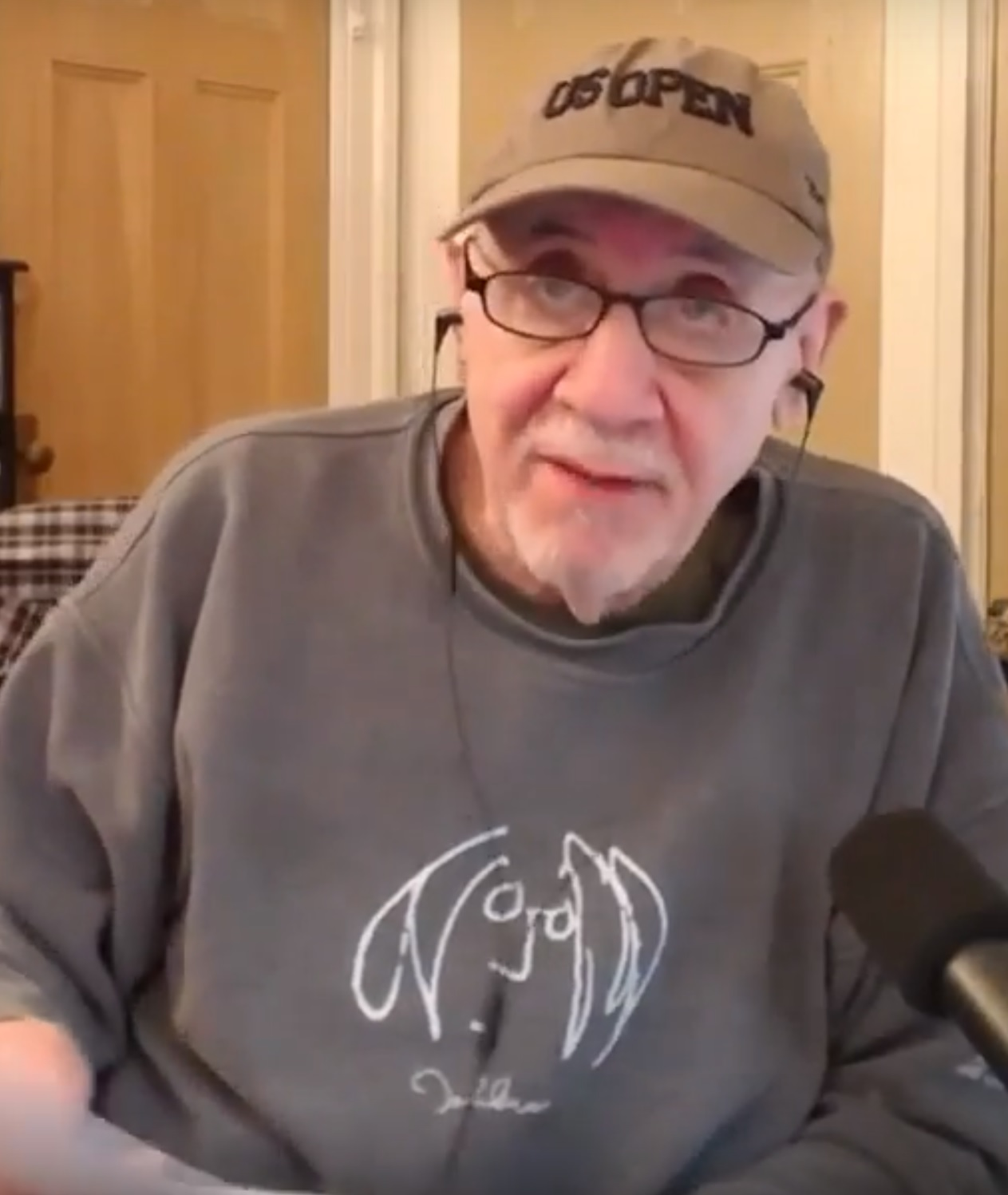
- Born: Bennett Gordon Schwarzmann; December 18, 1939 (age 86); San Francisco, California, United States
- Occupation: Radio personality

Bennett Gordon Schwarzmann (born December 18, 1939), better known by his on-air name, Alex Bennett, is an American talk radio host, known for his mix of left-wing politics and humor. In the 1970s he made his mark in New York City where he was dubbed "The Youth Guru" by the press for his work on WMCA and WPLJ.

In the 1980s and 1990s he moved back to his home town of San Francisco where this time the press dubbed him "The King of Comedy" for his influence on the local comedy scene first at KMEL, then on KQAK ("The Quake") and ultimately at Live 105. He then went on to create a live Internet TV network with Play Inc. called "PlayTV", and later a one-year stint as the host of a technology show on CNET Radio.

Eventually he moved back to New York City where he hosted a weekday radio show on SiriusXM channel "SIRIUS Left" until June 28, 2013. He now hosts a live podcast GABNet.net Tuesdays through Friday from 10:00 PM until midnight Eastern.

== Early years ==
Bennett was born on December 18, 1939, in San Francisco and attended Drake High School in San Anselmo, California. He adopted his on-air name as a tribute to his late father, Alexander Schwarzmann.

During the 1960s, Bennett worked at several radio stations around the country, including KILT in Houston, where he used the on-air moniker James Bond and did his show using an English accent, and WLOL in Minneapolis before moving on to other large markets.

In Chicago, he hosted a nightly music program on 560 WIND where his newscaster was Don Cornelius (who later hosted television's Soul Train). It was in Chicago during the 1968 Democratic National Convention riots that he became radicalized.

== WMCA New York ==
In 1969 he was recruited by Top 40 station AM 570 WMCA in New York City, where he worked with Murray the K, Barry Gray (who became a mentor) and where one of his engineers was comedian Jimmie Walker. Bennett was an overnight talk show host during the station's transition from its Top 40 "Good Guys" music format to the pioneering "Dial-Log" all-talk era. Bennett brought a progressive rock radio sensibility to the teenage-oriented station, still playing album cuts of music as his talk show evolved, and openly discussing topics ranging from his love life to his participation in various countercultural events, before giving his yogic sign-off "Namaste" (sometimes rendered in English as "the God within me sees the God within you").

In 1969, Bennett flew to London to investigate the rumor of Paul McCartney's death. He later became friends with John Lennon and Yoko Ono, who in 1970 heard Bennett introduce her debut album on the air by saying, "I think in 1980 music will probably sound like this." Lennon and Ono subsequently appeared on Bennett's show.

In 1970, Bennett was fired when WMCA signed the New York Yankees. With baseball games running in Bennett's evening time slot, the station felt there was no place for him. The dismissal was protested by over a thousand people in front of the radio station. The story made headlines in the New York newspapers. It was featured in Variety with four articles on the same page, and Bennett was described in The New Yorker as "martyr of the cultural revolution."

== WPLJ ==
Bennett and his wife-producer Ronni moved their show to New York FM station 95.5 WABC-FM (which soon became WPLJ) with the station at first recruiting him for morning drive time. He later switched to a free-wheeling overnight show. By late 1971 the couple had split.

Guests on Bennett's WPLJ show included rock stars such as John Lennon, comedians like George Carlin and left-wing, anti-war activists such as Timothy Leary, Jerry Rubin and Abbie Hoffman who would call him from the "Chicago Seven" trial.

While at WPLJ as an early video pioneer (a lifelong hobby), Bennett created and produced Midnight Blue with Bruce David (who went on to be the editor for "Hustler Magazine"). The show was seen on a New York public-access cable TV channel. Susan Finesilver, whom Bennett married in November 1976, was a regular contributor, interviewer, and guest on the show. The couple divorced in 1992.

Bennett was let go from WPLJ in 1974. Afterward, Bennett continued to appear on New York broadcast outlets, including WMCA.

== San Francisco ==
Bennett was asked to do a tryout week at a radio station in his native San Francisco. With the tryout a success, he was signed to host a morning show for album-oriented rock (AOR) station 106.1 KMEL, teaming up with newsman Joe Regelski. While at KMEL, Bennett's mother, Ruth, achieved fame as the world's oldest AOR disk jockey when she hosted a Sunday night countdown show on KMEL from 1982 to 1983. After Bennett's departure, Ruth continued at KMEL for a year. Ruth died in 2005 at the age of 100.

The Alex Bennett Show left KMEL when he was offered a lucrative deal and unprecedented creative freedom at a competitor station. Bennett and Regelski signed to do the morning show on 98.9 KQAK "The Quake" (now KSOL) where they remained for two years. Bennett left KQAK for modern rock outlet 105.3 KITS ("Live 105"), where he did two stints.

As a regular staple, the shows in San Francisco featured local and national comedians in front of a live studio audience. Performers Bob Goldthwait, Whoopi Goldberg, Dana Carvey, Ray Romano, Margaret Cho and Jay Leno were among the guests on Bennett's program, which influenced the next generation of Bay Area comedians. Bennett also would do road shows such as "Breakfast with Bennett" and "Supper with Schwarzmann" which featured live stand-up comedy stars, musical acts and a live house band. Bennett also produced a number of sold out live comedy shows. During the 1980s, Bennett was the original host of public television's "Comedy Tonight." In the 1990s won a local San Francisco Emmy Award for his work on "Log On TV" on KGO-TV 7.

Bennett was fired after a few years at Live 105, but was back after nine months. During that time he moved to Miami and hosted a talk show on local AM talk station 610 WIOD. He considered that move a sour experience due to it being an AM station and with considerable restrictions on his freedom to talk.

CBS Radio then bought KITS and paid off the remainder of Bennett's contract with WIOD Miami so he could return to Live 105 to again host mornings. Bennett remained at Live 105 until July 1997. CBS Radio had a desire to put its own syndicated Howard Stern Show on the station. Until then, Stern was heard in the Bay Area on San Jose-based 98.5 KOME, but did not have a clear signal in all parts of San Francisco. Bennett was fired in the middle of a live show being broadcast from Walnut Creek, California and was subsequently replaced by Johnny Steele, who tanked the ratings of the show and was then replaced by Howard Stern the following year. Coincidentally, both Stern and Bennett would later be co-workers at SiriusXM satellite radio.

== Internet TV and radio ==
A technology aficionado, Bennett took advantage of the early growth of the World Wide Web. After leaving FM rock radio in the late 1990s, Bennett created an Internet Television show for Play TV. The show ended when the company went out of business. Bennett also developed an early website, The Surfing Monkey, along with Chuck Farnham, David Biedny and Jesse Montrose. It featured, among other things, a series of articles written by an inmate on Death Row at San Quentin State Prison. Bennett is personally opposed to the death penalty. The prisoner, identified by the pseudonym Dean (Dean Phillip Carter), reported on daily prison life in a series called "Dead Man Talking." Bennett also voiced the Starbase Commander character in the 1994 release of Star Control 2 by 3DO.

Bennett briefly returned to radio in 2001 to host a technology-oriented midday talk show for CNET Radio at its San Francisco flagship station, 960 KNEW. Bennett's attempt to return to general AM talk radio was hampered by his outspoken left-leaning political views (though he temporarily hosted a morning show on KNEW when it changed its format to talk in 2003). Station managers mostly wanted to hire right-wing talk show hosts.

== SiriusXM ==
In 2003, Bennett returned to New York. On April 19, 2004, he began hosting a show from 7am to 10am ET on Sirius Left (now known as "SiriusXM Progress"). On his weekday show, he talked about politics, entertainment, and personal interests. He has also served as a substitute host for syndicated talk show host Lionel on several occasions.

In 2008 Bennett was inducted into the San Francisco Bay Area Radio Hall of Fame.

On March 27, 2012, Alex married his longtime girlfriend Marjorie Miller (known as "Girlfriend" on his program). They currently reside in the Harlem district of New York City.

Bennett was told in late June 2013 that his last show on SiriusXM would be Friday, June 28, 2013.

In January 2014 Bennett started "GABNet" at gabnet.net which he calls "the first real innovation in phone-in talk radio since the format's invention," featuring group discussions with the listeners called "Citizen Panels."
