= 1970 in radio =

The year 1970 in radio saw the debut of a nationally syndicated music countdown show and the incorporation of NPR.

== Events ==
- April – KKDA in Dallas, Texas returns to rhythm and blues format.
- May 1 – Also in the Dallas/Fort Worth market, WBAP-AM 820 and WFAA-AM 570 finally end the time-share arrangement on both frequencies that had lasted since the earliest days of radio, leaving both stations free to finally adopt full-time formats. WBAP launches a country music format that will soon become very popular.
- July 11 – "American Top 40", hosted by Oakland, California radio personality (and show co-founder) Casey Kasem, is launched in national syndication. Created by Kasem and Don Bustany, and distributed by Watermark Inc., the program features the top 40 hits from Billboard magazine's Hot 100 chart. The show is a success and sets the standard for radio countdown programs for years to come.
- August 29 – Attempted hijacking of Radio North Sea International off the coast of the Netherlands in a commercial dispute, with events being broadcast live.

=== No dates ===
- Alex Bennett and his wife/producer Ronni move their show from WMCA to WPLJ in New York.
- The Pop Chronicles broadcast by American Forces Radio and Television Service.

== Debuts ==
- April 3 – Week Ending, BBC Radio 4's long-running topical satire show (end 1998).
- April 20 – KMIH (104.5 FM, now 88.9) signs on.
- July 11 – "American Top 40."
- October – KBEM-FM in Minneapolis, Minnesota signs on.
- October 5 – First edition of BBC Radio 4's weekday consumer affairs magazine programme You and Yours (continuing through 50 years on air).
- November – WMDR (96.9 FM) of Moline, Illinois signs on, formatting religious and beautiful music.
- November – KLNT-FM (97.7 FM) of Clinton, Iowa signs on.

=== No dates ===
- National Public Radio incorporated in the United States, taking over the National Educational Radio Network.
- Syndicated broadcasts of Adventures in Good Music with Karl Haas across the U.S. began, from WCLV.

== Closings ==
- National Educational Radio Network absorbed into the new National Public Radio in the United States.

== Births ==
- February 14 – Simon Pegg, British comedian, film and television actor, radio personality
- March 21 – Cenk Uygur, Turkish-American political commentator
- August 16 – Bonnie Bernstein, American television and radio sports reporter and anchor.
- November 23 – Zoë Ball, British television and radio presenter

== Deaths ==
- May 14 – Billie Burke, 84, American film, stage, radio and television actress
