= 1990 in radio =

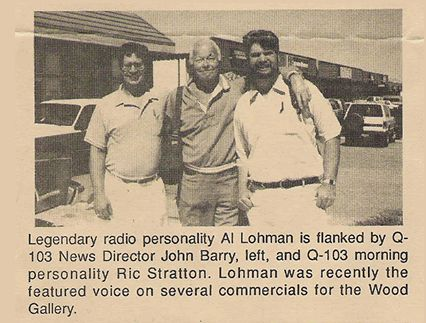
Radio personality Al Lohman, Q- 103 News Director John Barry, and Q-103 morning personality Ric Stratton in 1990

The year 1990 in radio involved some significant events.

== Events ==
- KJJO in Minneapolis, Minnesota transitions from active rock to alternative rock.
- KBLN in Dallas, Texas becomes KXEB.
- Daytimer KKDA in Dallas, Texas begins nighttime broadcasting.
- Emmis Communications sells several of their most noteworthy stations to offset losses from the purchase of the Seattle Mariners, including KXXX in San Francisco, WAVA-FM in Washington, DC and WLOL in Minneapolis, Minnesota.
- WHTE-FM signs in as Adult Contemporary format in the Charlottesville, Virginia Area.
- March 13 – WLVK/Charlotte flips to "high octane country" as "Thunder 96.9"; this direction last only a few months, with the station shifting back to a more traditional country format.
- June – KNRJ/Houston flips from Rhythmic CHR to Alternative Rock. The Alternative format will last only 5 weeks, and is promoted as temporary while the station's owners, Nationwide Communications, begin researching the market for a new format.
- July 13 – Nationwide Communications sells off WGAR 1220-AM in Cleveland, which was a direct simulcast of country WGAR 99.5-FM, to Douglas Broadcasting. WGAR-AM signs off at midnight on July 13 after airing a brief retrospective on the station, highlighted with tributes from station alumni Jack Paar and Don Imus. The station relaunches as WKNR a few minutes later, carrying a satellite-delivered oldies format, but will gradually assume an all-sports lineup in less than a year.
- July 20 – Nationwide's KNRJ flips to Hot AC as KHMX, "Mix 96.5."
- August 22 – Echo of Moscow (Russian: Э́хо Москвы́, romanized: Ekho Moskvy), a 24/7 independent commercial station, begins broadcasting from Moscow.
- October 2 – Radio Berlin International ceased its operation. The following day, Germany reunified.

== Debuts ==
- Chippie, a radio program on computer topics, debuts on Hessischer Rundfunk in Frankfurt.

== Deaths ==
- July 7 – Bill Cullen, American radio personality, game show host (born 1920)
- July 8 – Evelyn Kaye, American violinist, "Evelyn and Her Magic Violin" on The Hour of Charm
- July 30 – Karl Weber, American actor in old-time radio (born 1916)
- October 26 – William S. Paley, American chief executive who built Columbia Broadcasting System (CBS) from a small radio network into one of the foremost radio and television network operations in the United States (born 1901)

== See also ==
- Radio broadcasting
