= 1966 in radio =

The year 1966 in radio involved some significant events.

== Events ==
- September: KWNT-FM signs on the air, simulcasting the AM signal of KWNT (1580 AM) and its country music format. Unlike the AM signal, which is daytime only, KWNT-FM's broadcast day goes to at least 10 p.m.
- September 16: WFIL 560 AM in Philadelphia changes from an MOR adult standard format to top 40 as "The Pop Explosion – Famous 56"
- December 15 - WGIL-FM of Galesburg, Illinois signs on at 94.9 FM as sister station to WGIL-AM; by 1974, the station's call letters are changed to WAAG.

== Debuts ==
- May 3 – Swinging Radio England and Britain Radio commence broadcasting on AM, with a combined potential 100,000 watts, from the same ship anchored off the south coast of England in international waters.
- October 22 – WJVM (94.3 FM) launches in Sterling, Illinois.

== Births ==
- January 25 – Wes Durham, American sportscaster and radio play-by-play announcer for Georgia Tech sports.
- April 1 – Chris Evans, British radio disc jockey.
- April 23 – Bubba the Love Sponge, American radio personality.
- August 17 – Mister Cee, American disc jockey (died 2024).
- September 9 – Nikki Bedi, Anglo-Indian broadcast presenter.
- October 27 – Matt Drudge, American Internet journalist and talk radio host.
- November 19 – Shmuley Boteach, American radio host and personality.

== Deaths ==
- March 20, 1966 - J. Anthony Smythe, American actor (born 1885).
- April 11 – A. B. Campbell, English naval officer and radio broadcaster (born 1881).
- December 2 – Giles Cooper, British broadcast dramatist (born 1918).
