= 1988 in radio =

The year 1988 saw a number of significant events in radio broadcasting.

== Events ==
- February - Longtime St. Louis rocker KWK 106.5, tired of playing second-fiddle to KSHE 94.7, flips to CHR/Top-40 as WKBQ "Q-106.5" to try its luck going after consistently top-3 rated KHTR 103.3. Although the station skews younger ("Out with the old, in with the Q!"), it shaves off enough of KHTR's younger audience to drop it to the middle-of-the-pack and forces a format change later in the year.
- August 13 – Los Angeles radio personality Shadoe Stevens takes over as host of "American Top 40." He replaces Casey Kasem, who had hosted since the show's debut in 1970. Stevens will remain with the program until the end of its original run in January 1995.
- September – KMGK in Minneapolis, Minnesota becomes KQQL, adopting an oldies format after stunting various versions of "Louie Louie".
- September 22 – WYNY 97.1, a country music station and WQHT 103.5 (Hot 103), a CHR station swapped frequencies in New York City.
- October 7 – WNBC radio in New York signs off for the final time at 5:30 pm after 66 years on the air, being replaced with an all-sports station, WFAN. The switch was the culmination of a complicated station owner/format swap initiated by Emmis Communications, owner of WFAN and FM sister WQHT; the latter switched dial positions with WNBC's FM sister, WYNY, which was sold off to Westwood One. The original frequency for WFAN was spun off to The Jewish Daily Forward and became WEVD.
- November 1 – KHTR in St. Louis, Missouri becomes KLOU, going from a Top 40 format to an oldies format.

=== No dates ===
- The Soviet Union ceases jamming Radio Free Europe and other foreign radio stations.
- KBEC in Waxahachie, Texas flips from adult standards to country music.

== Debuts ==
- January 2 – Whose Line Is It Anyway? begins broadcasting on BBC Radio 4.
- August 1 – Rush Limbaugh makes his national debut from WABC in New York, his flagship station to this day.
- October – Arutz Sheva station begins broadcasting in Israel.

== Births ==
- January 9 – Glyn Wise, Welsh television/radio personality – runner-up, Big Brother 2006

== Deaths ==
- January 22 – Parker Fennelly, American actor, appeared in ten films, numerous television episodes and hundreds of radio programs (born 1891)
- April 1 – Jim Jordan, American voice actor (Fibber McGee and Molly) (born 1896)
- April 15 – Kenneth Williams, English comic actor (born 1926)
- April 25 – Lanny Ross, American singer, pianist and songwriter (born 1906)
- June 22 – Dennis Day, Irish-American singer and broadcast personality (born 1916)
- June 25 – Mildred Gillars ("Axis Sally"), American Nazi propaganda broadcaster (born 1900)
- July 7 – Jimmy Edwards, English comic actor (born 1920)
- October 3 – Mae Brussell, American conspiracy theorist and radio personality (born 1922)
- October 28 – Jack de Manio, English radio broadcaster (born 1914)

== See also ==
- Radio broadcasting
