= Hot Hits =

Hot Hits was a radio format created by consultant Mike Joseph in the 1970s. That concept, which helped spur the birth of what is now known as CHR, also revitalized the Top 40 format and would play a role in bringing the format to the FM band throughout the 1980s.

The concept was to play only the current hits on the Top 30 (or Top 50 on some stations) and no recurrents (that is, recent hits which had already finished their run on the charts) or oldies whatsoever (unless they happened to be cuts on current chart albums).

== The Hot Hits Jingles ==
Most "Hot Hits" stations used a jingle package from TM Productions, Inc. (now TM Studios) of Dallas, Texas, known initially as "The Actualizers" and syndicated combined with another package as "Fusion" by 1982, however both "The Actualizers" and "Fusion" cuts had been renamed the jingles as "Hot Hits!" to solidify its association with Joseph's stations (although the jingle package was not exclusive to Joseph-consulted stations, and in fact was used by some stations which programmed Oldies or even Country formats). The jingles were often played back-to-back two or three in a row.

Both the "Actualizers" and the "Fusion" jingles were actually created for TM in Los Angeles by Dick Hamilton. The original versions were sung in Los Angeles in Dick's studios by the Ron Hicklin Singers, but by the time of the "Hot Hits!" format, the vocals were recorded exclusively in Dallas. Many of the station references for the "Hot Hits!" jingles reside in the archives of Media Preservation Foundation.

== Formatics ==
The creation of "Hot Hits" was Mike Joseph's method of combating the "more music, less personality" approach that was becoming prevalent on Top 40 radio at the time, as well as the splintering of Top 40 into urban-leaning, adult contemporary-leaning and album rock-leaning camps, and what Joseph perceived as neglecting the needs of younger listeners aged 12 to 24 to focus solely on older adults. "Hot Hits" stations bucked this trend by playing all the hits on the charts, regardless of genre, whether they were rock, pop, new wave, R&B, AC, heavy metal, disco, country, oldies, or hip-hop.

"Hot Hits" stations played the Top 5 hits every hour and in between other hits on the current chart. The top hits on an average Hot Hits station had a turnover period of 45 minutes to an hour, thus guaranteeing that when listeners tuned in, they were more likely to hear a hit and less likely to hear a "stiff" or a "bomb." They often also featured cuts from current chart albums, even if those cuts happened to be songs which had already charted and would have been considered recurrent or gold otherwise.

Joseph put much effort into localizing the sound of his stations by having his DJs frequently mention cities and towns in the stations' listening areas, as well as streets, high and junior high schools, and other local landmarks. Prior to launching each Hot Hits station, he would spend months studying the market and the living patterns of its residents, and he stayed on at each station following its launch until he was certain the station was on the right track. (Usually stations kept him on as a consultant for a 52-week period afterward.) One of the most frequent contests featured on Hot Hits stations was known as "The Name Game," or "Family Fortune" in some markets in later years. A person with a particular last name or living on a particular street would be called by the DJ and would then be asked the amount of cash in the jackpot in that time. A correct answer meant that the person won all the money in the jackpot; an incorrect answer or busy signal meant that the station would then add more money into the jackpot and try again with a different last name or street. This type of contest giveaway was standard on virtually all Hot Hits outlets consulted by Joseph.

In a 1982 Billboard article, Joseph stated that he felt the reason for his stations' success was that they hearkened back to the basics of Top 40 radio: "playing the hits, having fun, generating excitement through promotions, contests, and name-dropping - giving people what they want to hear, when they want to hear it. The standard of show business is to program the happening acts."

== History ==
=== Joseph's early successes ===
Mike Joseph, a native of Youngstown, Ohio, and graduate of Western Reserve University in Cleveland, began his radio career in 1950 at WTNS in Coshocton, Ohio, and soon moved on to Grand Rapids, Michigan, to program CBS Radio affiliate WJEF (now WTKG). In December 1955, he moved on to Flint, Michigan, to transition old-line NBC Radio affiliate WTAC into one of the nation's first Top 40 stations and a stunning success. WTAC's owners, the Founders Group, installed him as their national program director, and Joseph also oversaw stations in New Orleans, Honolulu, and Syracuse, NY (the Syracuse station, WFBL, would later become one of his "Hot Hits" stations in 1979).

From Flint, Joseph moved on to program WMAX in Grand Rapids and WKBW in Buffalo (which he later described as his first prototype of the Hot Hits format), and then in 1960, he helped transform WABC in New York City from a struggling, cash-strapped block-programmed outlet into one of the dominant Top 40 stations in North America. In the fall of 1963, following another success story in Grand Rapids at WLAV, Joseph oversaw the transformation of struggling MOR station WKMH in Detroit into WKNR (Keener 13), still fondly remembered as one of the Motor City's most popular radio stations ever, and a few years later oversaw a similar turnabout at WFIL in Philadelphia. His resume also included stations in Minneapolis, St. Louis, New Orleans, Puerto Rico, and other markets, in a variety of formats from Top 40 to talk radio to beautiful music (Joseph admitted to being a classical music aficionado in a 1983 Billboard magazine article).

In 1972, Joseph set the stage for what would become the first wave of Hot Hits stations on the FM band when he was hired to program WMVM, a struggling beautiful-music station in Milwaukee. In June of that year, WMVM's calls were changed to WZUU, and Joseph installed a tight Top 40 playlist of 30 current songs (with no recurrents or gold) which he dubbed "Super Hits." Joseph later credited his approach at WZUU for helping to end the dominance of Milwaukee's two AM Top 40 stations, WOKY and WRIT (ironically, WZUU today bears the WRIT calls). Further success came in 1975 at WPJB "JB105" in Providence, Rhode Island, with a similarly styled format known as "Big Hits."

=== Hot Hits takes off ===
Joseph's first high-profile success story with the Hot Hits approach came in the spring of 1975, when he switched WTIC-FM (96.5) in Hartford, CT, from a long-running but low-rated classical music format to hit radio as "96 Tics". Classical music fans were irate, but the move paid off for WTIC-FM, as the station was top five-rated in the Hartford market by the end of that year. Although WTIC-FM dumped the 96 Tics name, the Fusion jingles, and the Mike Joseph formatics in the spring of 1979, it continued as a Top 40 station until tweaking its sound to Hot Adult Contemporary in 1994.

The first Mike Joseph-consulted station to actually use the term "Hot Hits" on the air, and one of the few AM stations to try the "Hot Hits" concept, was WFBL-AM (1390) in Syracuse, NY - which Joseph had programmed back in 1956 as national program director of the Founders Group. In response to dropping ratings, WFBL management hired Joseph in the spring of 1979 to help turn around the station's already-in-place "Hit Radio 14" Top 40 format). From June 1979 through November 1980 (when the station changed format to Music of Your Life), WFBL played "Hot Hits" as "Fire 14," which played its top 14 hits every week in heavy rotation.

The "Hot Hits" concept really appeared to grow in popularity after WCAU-FM (98.1) in Philadelphia, which had been struggling through unsuccessful Urban, Oldies and Disco formats for over a decade, relaunched with Hot Hits on September 22, 1981, as "98 Now." With legendary personalities such as Christy Springfield, Terry "The Motormouth" Young, Scott Walker, Rich Hawkins, Bob Garrett, with Todd Parker and Billy Burke. Paul Barsky would join in Mornings a year later. WCAU-FM came to dominate as Philadelphia's first and only choice for non-stop hot hit music from 1981 to 1986. WCAU-FM ended when they flipping to Oldies as WOGL in 1987. Within a year of WCAU-FM debuting "98 Now," "Hot Hits" had moved west to Chicago's WBBM-FM, where the original staff included Steve Davis, Joe Dawson, Gary Spears, Dave Robbins, Bob Lewis, Frank Foster and Tony Taylor; and Detroit's WHYT (now WDVD), which both coincidentally were both on the 96.3 FM frequency and used the on-air name "96 Now."

Other stations in the early 1980s which utilized the "Hot Hits" concept included: WFEC-AM (1400), Harrisburg, PA ("Fire 14"); KITS-FM (105.3), San Francisco ("105 Kits," prior to the adoption of the station's long-running Alternative Rock format); WMAR-FM (106.5), Baltimore (later also as WMKR, "K106"); and WNVZ-FM (104.5), Norfolk/Newport News, VA ("Z104"). WFEC, which had been a successful Top 40 station in years past, was not consulted by Mike Joseph although it was modeled after WCAU-FM and followed the basics of Joseph's formula to the letter. The format's success also inspired imitators, such as the Rick Peters-derived "Hit Radio" approach utilized at a number of CBS-owned FM stations, including WHTT (formerly WEEI-FM) Boston, KHTR St. Louis, and KKHR Los Angeles, in the mid-1980s. The "Hot Hits" concept not just grew in the United States, but it expanded to its neighboring country of Canada as well on Saskatoon's CKOM beginning in 1985.

=== The heat cools off ===
Beginning in 1983 Hot Hits stations started playing recent hits from the past several years mixed into the Hot Hits. Most of the stations therefore evolved into a more common CHR station as a result. By the end of 1983, both WBBM-FM in Chicago and WHYT in Detroit had allowed their contracts with Joseph to expire and had dropped the "Hot Hits" formatics while continuing to stay with the Top 40 sound and breaking in non-current music. Both would continue with success in the CHR format through the rest of the 1980s and beyond. While WNVZ is the most recent station known to have used the pure "Hot Hits" approach under that name, Joseph did go on to program several other CHR stations during the late 1980s with similar formatics, including WTRK "Electric 106" in Philadelphia in 1986, and WGY-FM "Electric 99" in Schenectady, NY, in 1988. WQBA-FM in Miami also ran a Spanish-language version of the format, complete with the "Hot Hits" jingle package, in the mid-1990s, although they referred to the format by the English phrase "Super Hits."

Joseph, who had trademarked the phrase "Hot Hits" in 1979, did allow some of his former client stations, including WHYT and WCAU-FM, to continue identifying themselves with the phrase "Hot Hits", and also allowed some stations he did not consult which he felt were close to the original Hot Hits concept, such as WZOU in Boston, WNTQ in Syracuse, KSDO-FM in San Diego, and KAMZ in El Paso, to use the phrase as well. However, in 1994, he took legal action to stop Blockbuster Video from using the phrase "hot hits" to describe their new releases and top-rented videocassettes.

Joseph died April 14, 2018.
