= 1968 in radio =

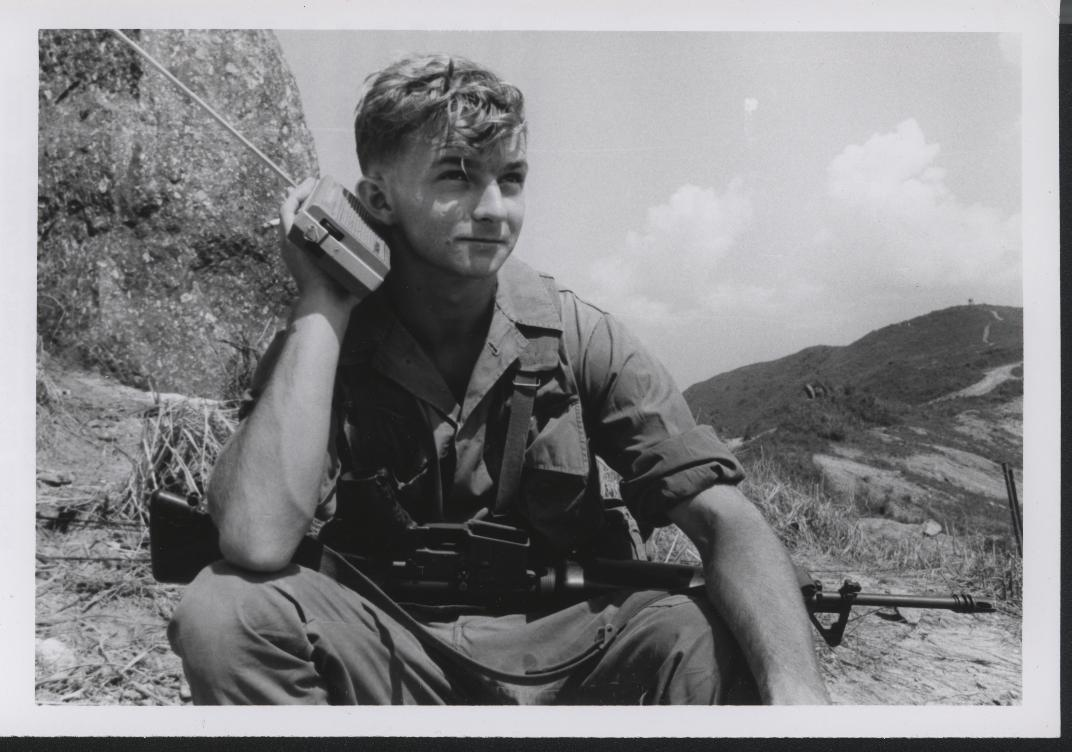

The year 1968 saw a number of significant events in radio broadcasting history.

== Events ==
- 1 January – ABC divides its radio network into four networks.
- 1 February – WABX Detroit drops classical music to air progressive rock/freeform full-time.
- 1 February – WKYC-AM in Cleveland (today WTAM) alters its Top 40 format to "Power Radio," a "more music"–style presentation derivative of Drake-Chenuault.
- 3 March – Radio Caroline's pirate radio ships MV Mi Amigo and Fredericia are seized by an offshore supply company as security for unpaid debts and towed into Amsterdam.
- 11 March – KFWB in Los Angeles becomes the third Westinghouse Broadcasting station to launch an all-news format, patterned after KYW (AM) in Philadelphia and WINS (AM) in New York.
- 15 March – WBCN in Boston, Massachusetts begins to drop easy listening for progressive rock/freeform.
- 18 March – KMPX program director Tom Donahue turns in his resignation, citing conflicts with station management. Staff at both KMPX and sister station KPPC in Pasadena, angered by the move, start a strike that lasts eight weeks.
- 15 April – KNX (AM) in Los Angeles, a CBS Radio O&O, switches to an all-news format.
- 29 April – WMMR in Philadelphia, Pennsylvania switches to progressive rock/freeform as "The Marconi Experiment."
- 10 May – The government of France issues an order prohibiting the state broadcaster ORTF from televising the May 68 student demonstrations in Paris, but ORTF radio correspondents are allowed to make live reports and the independent Radio Luxembourg sends its own journalists to France and keeps them there despite harassment from the French police. Because of the live broadcasts, news of the rebellion spread from Paris to the rest of France and to media around the world.
- 15 May – The U.S. Central Intelligence Agency shuts down Radio Americas, a station that had gone on the air in 1960 as part of a campaign against Cuba's leader, Fidel Castro. Originally called "Radio Swan" because its transmitter was located on one of the uninhabited Swan Islands, Honduras, the station "spearheaded anti-Castro rumor campaigns" and even "supplied its listeners with sabotage instructions".
- 21 May – In San Francisco, Metromedia purchases classical music KSFR, changes the call letters to KSAN, and hires former KMPX program director Tom Donahue to head the new progressive rock/freeform format.
- June – ABC Radio hires Allen Shaw from WCFL in Chicago to develop an all-automated rock format for their FM stations, which results in the "Love" format. The stations involved were WABC-FM (now WPLJ) in New York, WLS-FM in Chicago, KGO-FM (now KOSF) in San Francisco, KQV-FM (now WDVE) in Pittsburgh, WXYZ-FM (now WRIF) in Detroit, KXYZ-FM (now KHMX) in Houston, and KABC-FM (now KLOS) in Los Angeles.
- 5 June – New York Senator Robert F. Kennedy is assassinated in the Ambassador Hotel shortly after midnight PST (10.00 GMT), following a victory in the California primary election for the Democratic Party nomination for President of the United States. Reporter Andrew West of Mutual Broadcasting System radio affiliate KRKD in Los Angeles (now KEIB), intended to capture an exclusive interview with the senator, but instead captured on audio tape the sounds of the immediate aftermath of the shooting (but not the actual shooting itself). With a reel-to-reel tape recorder and attached microphone, West also provided an on-the-spot account of the struggle with assassin Sirhan Sirhan in the hotel's kitchen pantry, which was relayed to the entire Mutual network, and was a watershed moment in news coverage of U.S. presidential campaigns.
- 10 June – KMET in Los Angeles starts airing four hours of progressive rock in the nighttime, programmed by KSAN's Tom and Raechel Donahue. It eventually goes to a full-time format as "The Mighty MET."
- 18 June – KBOO-FM signs on as one of the earliest community radio stations in the United States.
- 1 July – WIBC-FM flips from classical music to album-oriented rock as WNAP.
- 2 August: DZAQ-AM's coverage of the aftermath of the 1968 Casiguran earthquake in the Philippines, relayed on ABS-CBN Corporation's DZAQ-TV, would become the first ever join radio-TV news coverage ever in the country. In recognition of its vital role in the Metro Manila coverage, the corporation would later ask station management to reformat it to a full service news radio station the following month.
- 28 September – WHK-FM in Cleveland, the last FM station in the Metromedia chain to launch a progressive rock/freeform format, changes its calls to WMMS, derivative of their owner.

Undated

- KQRS-FM drops beautiful music for freeform rock
- Al Tedesco purchases KWFM in Minneapolis, Minnesota, later changes it to country music as KTCR.

== Debuts ==
- KNTH, Houston, Texas
- KRLA 1110 news director Lew Irwin forms The Credibility Gap.
- KBOO (90.7fm) goes on the air in Portland, Oregon – June.

== Closings ==
- 27 December – Don McNeill's The Breakfast Club ends its 35 1/2-year run on one network: the NBC Blue Network (1933–1942), the Blue Network (1942–1945), ABC Radio (1945–1968) and the American Entertainment Network (1968). Don McNeill's tenure as host for the entire duration of the program remains the longest tenure for an emcee of a network entertainment program on both radio and television.

== Births ==
- 1 June – Steve Czaban, American sports radio personality
- 2 June – Beetlejuice, American member of the Wack Pack from radio's The Howard Stern Show
- 19 July – Jim Norton, American comedian and radio personality (Opie with Jim Norton, previously The Opie and Anthony Show)
- 19 September – Monica Crowley, American conservative radio and television political commentator
- 2 October – Victoria Derbyshire, British radio presenter
- 24 October – Sal the Stockbroker, American comedian and radio writer for The Howard Stern Show
- Chris Neill, English radio comedy producer and performer

== Deaths ==
- 12 December – Tallulah Bankhead, 66, American actress and host of The Big Show
