= 1967 in radio =

The year 1967 saw a number of significant happenings in radio broadcasting history.

== Events ==
- 14 August: The British Marine Broadcasting Offences Act 1967 was passed, making it an offence to advertise or supply an offshore radio station from the UK. This resulted in the closure of all of Britain's offshore pirate radio stations with the exception of Radio Caroline.
- 30 September: Radio Ceylon becomes the Ceylon Broadcasting Corporation.
- 31 October: WNEW-FM in New York City adopts a progressive rock format, the first station to do so in the Metromedia chain.
- 7 November: The Public Broadcasting Act of 1967 leads to the start of National Public Radio in the United States.
- Fall: St. Louis radio station KSHE flips from female-oriented rock to progressive rock, becoming the first progressive rock radio station in the US.

== Debuts ==
- 22 January: first day of broadcasting of Minnesota Public Radio (MPR). The network paired with American Public Media in 2004 and is now the second largest producer of public radio programming in the United States, following National Public Radio.
- c. 1 April: CKLW in Windsor, Ontario adopts Bill Drake's Boss Radio top-40 format, eventually taking on the name "The Big 8" by the end of the year and soon becoming one of the most influential radio stations in North America.
- 30 June: WCPR (AM) 1450 went on the air in Coamo, Puerto Rico.
- 27 June: KNEI 1140 went on the air in Waukon, Iowa.
- 28 August: WCBS begins all-news programming on its FM sister station, necessitated by a plane crash that destroyed WCBS (AM) and WNBC (AM)'s shared broadcast tower. The station still carries Arthur Godfrey's mid-morning program, and music programming during the overnight hours.
- 17 September: First broadcast of The World This Weekend.
- 30 September: The BBC scraps its outmoded Home Service and replaces it with the all-speech BBC Radio 4. The Light Programme is divided between a new national pop station Radio 1, modeled on the successful pirate station Radio London, and BBC Radio 2. The Third Programme is renamed Radio 3.
- 19 September: WPJX 1660 went on the air as WZBN in Zion, Illinois.
- 30 September: BBC Radio 1 is launched in the UK.
- 2 October: The popular Japanese radio series, All Night Nippon, is broadcast for the first time on Nippon Broadcasting System, in the Kanto region.
- 8 November: BBC Local Radio starts. The first station is BBC Radio Leicester.
- 22 December: Radio comedy panel game Just a Minute chaired by Nicholas Parsons first transmitted on BBC Radio 4; Parsons continues to chair the show until shortly before his death in 2020.

Undated

- KMAQ of Maquoketa, Iowa adds an FM frequency, which signs on the air at 95.3 FM and allows the station to broadcast local and sporting events after sunset. (The AM frequency was daytime only.) The station moves several years later to 95.1 FM.
- University Radio York becomes Britain's first student radio station, and also the country's first independent radio station.
- 3AW becomes Australia's first talkback radio station.

== Closings ==
- 13 October: House Party ends its run on network radio (CBS).
- 31 December: ABC Radio ceases operations as one network; it would be divided into four specialized networks (Information, Entertainment, Direction and Contemporary) on New Year's Day 1968. This is due to some of ABC's owned-and-operated stations (WABC, WLS, WXYZ, KQV) airing Top 40 formats that directly conflicted with ABC Radio's long-form, entertainment programming, in addition for ABC's desire to gain more than one affiliate in a market. The Breakfast Club and Paul Harvey would transfer to the American Entertainment Network, extended news blocks would move to the American Information Network, and the aforementioned ABC O&Os became affiliates of the American Contemporary Network.

== Births ==
- 7 January – Mark Lamarr, British comedian and radio and television presenter
- 1 March – Jakki Brambles, English television and radio presenter and reporter
- 28 March – John Ziegler, radio talk show host on KFI in Los Angeles
- 27 April – Jason Whitlock, American sports personality
- 14 May - Tillmann Uhrmacher, German DJ, musician and radio host (died 2011)
- 9 June – Jian Ghomeshi, Canadian broadcaster, writer, and musician
- 1 July – Kim Komando, American radio host, America's Digital Goddess
- 6 August – Mike Greenberg, television and radio host for ESPN
- 11 October – Artie Lange, American television and film actor, stand-up comic and radio personality
- 14 October – Stephen A. Smith, American sports radio host.
- 13 November – Jimmy Kimmel, American comedian, writer, radio and television talk show host, game show host, and television producer
- date unknown – Jamie Owen, Welsh radio and television presenter

== Deaths ==
- 1 June – Derek McCulloch, 69, BBC Radio presenter and producer
- 3 February – Martin Block, 66, American radio disc jockey considered the world's first as host of Make Believe Ballroom
- 18 March - Jimmy Blaine, 42, American radio and television performer, producer, and writer
- 25 August – Lam Bun, 37, radio commentator for Commercial Radio Hong Kong (murdered during the Hong Kong 1967 riots)
- December – Douglas Ritchie (born 1905), British radio news editor and wartime propaganda broadcaster
