= 1969 in radio =

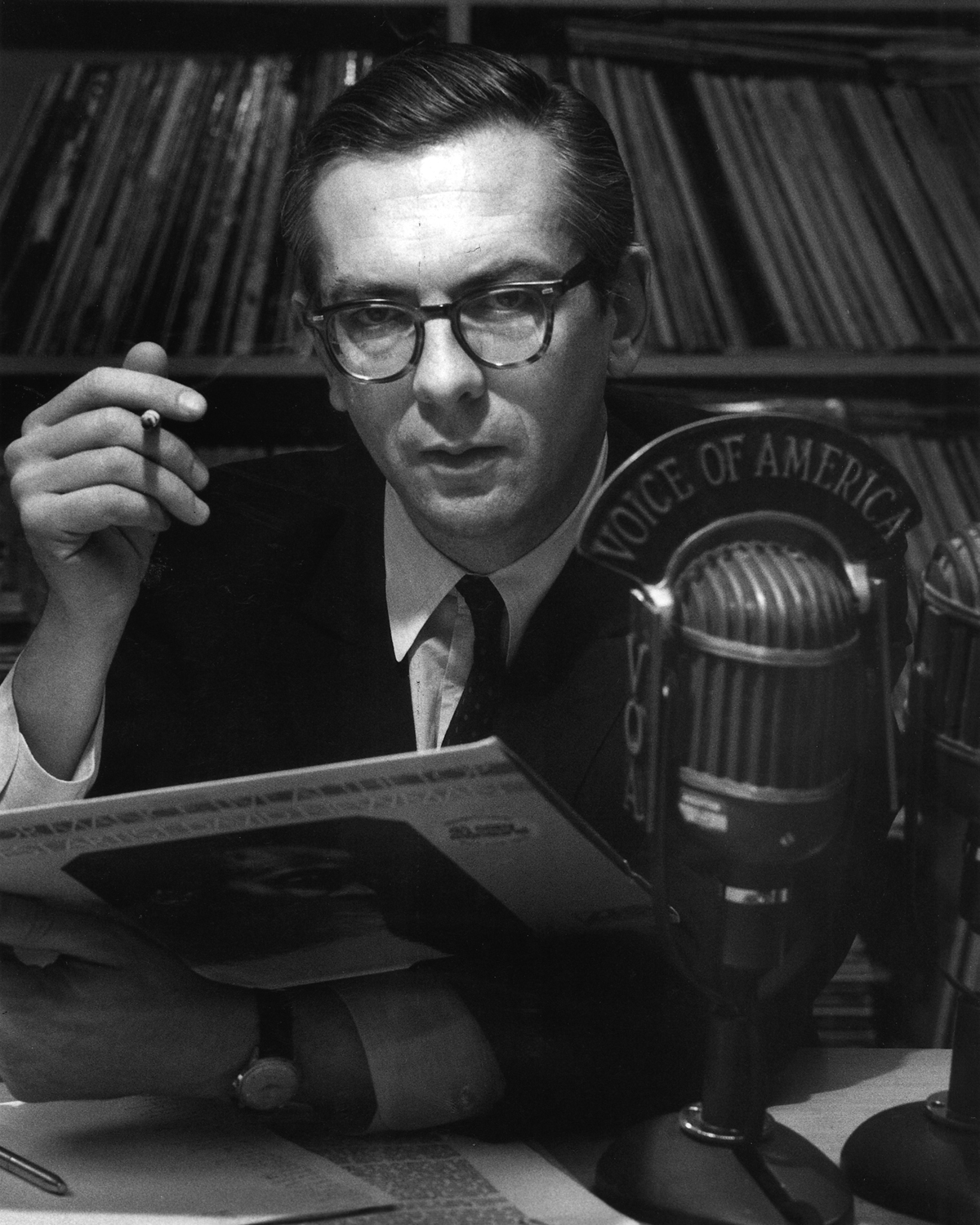
Willis Conover jazz producer and broadcaster on the Voice of America radio program for over forty years, 1969.

Significant events in radio broadcasting in the year 1969 included the debuts of two documentaries on rock and roll.

== Events ==
- 21–23 February: The History of Rock and Roll, a comprehensive 48-part documentary, debuts on KHJ in Los Angeles. Produced and hosted by Bill Drake, the series airs on the RKO General chain of stations that Drake programmed, and is nationally syndicated.
- 1 March: NHK begins FM broadcasting in Japan.
- 9 March: With the exception of Arthur Godfrey Time, WTOP in Washington, DC switches to an all-news format.
- 11 April: Radyo Veritas, the first Catholic radio station in the Philippines, is inaugurated with Asian bishops as guests. Antonio Cardinal Samore represents Pope Paul VI. It begins broadcasting on the frequency of 860 kHz, formerly assigned to DZST, another Catholic radio station formerly operated by the University of Santo Tomas.
- 15 June: DZME 1530 starts its broadcast when Congress authorizes the Capitol Broadcasting Center of Jose M. Luison and Sons, Inc. to operate an AM radio station in the Philippines.
- 19 September: The Vienna Radio Symphony Orchestra is formed as the ORF-Symphonieorchester by the Austrian national broadcaster.
- 3 October: The Fernsehturm Berlin broadcasting tower opens in East Berlin.
- November: The National Science Network, Inc. purchases KMPX (FM) in San Francisco, and KPPC (AM) and KPPC-FM in Pasadena from Crosby-Pacific Broadcasting Company for a combined $1,084,000.
- Undated: WSAU-FM in Wausau, Wisconsin changes to Top 40 as WIFC, and continues with those calls and format nearly 40 years later.

== Debuts ==
- 9 February, The Pop Chronicles on KRLA 1110.
- 21 February, The History of Rock and Roll on KHJ.
- WCCO-FM in Minneapolis, Minnesota signs on.

== Births ==
- 31 January – Craig Carton, American radio personality, co-host of Boomer Esiason's morning show on WFAN in New York City, which became the permanent replacement for Imus in the Morning on 4 September 2007.
- 25 March – Bill Spadea, American DJ and radio personality
- 7 June – Adam Buxton, English actor and comedian
- 24 June – Rich Eisen, American sportscaster

== Deaths ==
- 3 January: Howard McNear, American stage, screen and radio character actor.
- 3 November: David Young, American radio producer, director and actor
