= 1976 in radio =

The year 1976 saw a number of significant events in radio broadcasting.

== Events ==
- September - Fairchild Industries sells WYOO-FM and AM in Minneapolis, Minnesota. The AM becomes WAYL and the FM station becomes a simulcast of KDWB
- September 6: DWRT-FM (Manila, Philippines) signs on the air as 99.5 RT, and it became the first Top 40 station in the Philippines.
- KXOL in Dallas, Texas flips from Top 40 to country music

== Debuts ==
- January – WEMO (101.3 FM, now KUUL) of East Moline, Illinois signs on, formating a mix of light adult contemporary and middle of the road music.
- March 8 - Radio 210 (now Heart Berkshire) begins broadcasting to the Reading area.
- March 14 - 951 Remix begins broadcasting in Trinidad and Tobago as 95FM.
- March 16 - Downtown Radio, the first Independent Local Radio in Northern Ireland, begins broadcasting to the Belfast area.
- April 12 - Beacon Radio (now Free Radio Shropshire & Black Country) begins broadcasting to the Wolverhampton area; this is the final station in the first wave of Independent Local Radio stations to begin transmission.
- Unknown date - DWLS-FM, the flagship FM station of GMA Radio-Television Arts in the Philippines was launched with a jazz format.

== Births ==
- January 3 - Angela Yee, former co-host of The Breakfast Club
- October 21 - Lindsay Brien, American radio personality in Atlanta, Georgia, entertainment reporter for Headline News, and part of MTV's The Real World Seattle season in 1998.
- December 21 - Clarence Black, Detroit, Michigan sports radio personality and contestant on Survivor: Africa.
- Brody, American radio personality on WDGC-FM in Raleigh, North Carolina

== Deaths ==
- March 2 - Hollace Shaw, 62, American coloratura soprano on many old-time radio programs.
- March 24 - Nelson Case, 66, American radio announcer.
- June 25 - Jay Jostyn, 74, American radio and TV actor.
- Santos Ortega, 76, American actor and comedian.
