= 1984 in radio =

The year 1984 in radio involved some significant events.

== Events ==
- 31 January – Irish schoolgirl Ann Lovett dies after giving birth alone in a Marian grotto. Reporting on the incident on The Gay Byrne Show on RTÉ Radio 1 uncovers many stories from listeners of rape, abortion and sexual abuse.
- 1 June – KOKU (100.3 FM) in Agana, Guam signs on the air for the first time. The first format is contemporary hit radio music.
- 18 June – Controversial KOA/Denver radio talk show host Alan Berg gunned down in driveway of his home.
- 4 July – KBQC-FM (93.5 FM) in Bettendorf, Iowa signs on the air for the first time. The first format is middle of the road music with a community emphasis.
- October – CKLW-AM in Windsor, Ontario, the former "Big 8" Top 40 giant plagued by falling ratings for years, fires 79 staffers and goes mostly automated in preparation for a format change to Music of Your Life on 1 January 1985. CKLW's FM sister station CFXX experiments with a Top 40/Rock hybrid format called "94 Fox FM" in some dayparts, but its application to make "The Fox" a full-time format is denied by the CRTC and the experiment lasts only a few months.
- 5 November – Morning Ireland, Ireland's highest-rated radio programme, is broadcast on RTÉ Radio 1 for the first time.
- Sports writer Ralph Barbieri joins KNBR to host his own sports talk show. He lasts at the station, which is eventually sold by NBC and converted to a full-time sports radio format, up until 11 April 2012.

== Deaths ==
- 27 January: Lou Crosby, 64, announcer for Gene Autry's Melody Ranch.
- 6 May: Ned Wever, 85, radio's Dick Tracy and actor in many other old-time radio programs.
- 27 April: Richard Durham, writer and producer of the anthology series Destination Freedom
- Jim Bannon, 73, actor in radio and Hollywood western films during the 1940s and 1950s.
- Alan Berg, 50, Denver, Colorado-based liberal radio talk show host and former attorney.
- Howard Culver, 66, an American radio and television actor.
- Fred Waring, 84, popular musician, bandleader and radio-television personality, died 29 July.

== See also ==
- Radio broadcasting
