= 1979 in radio =

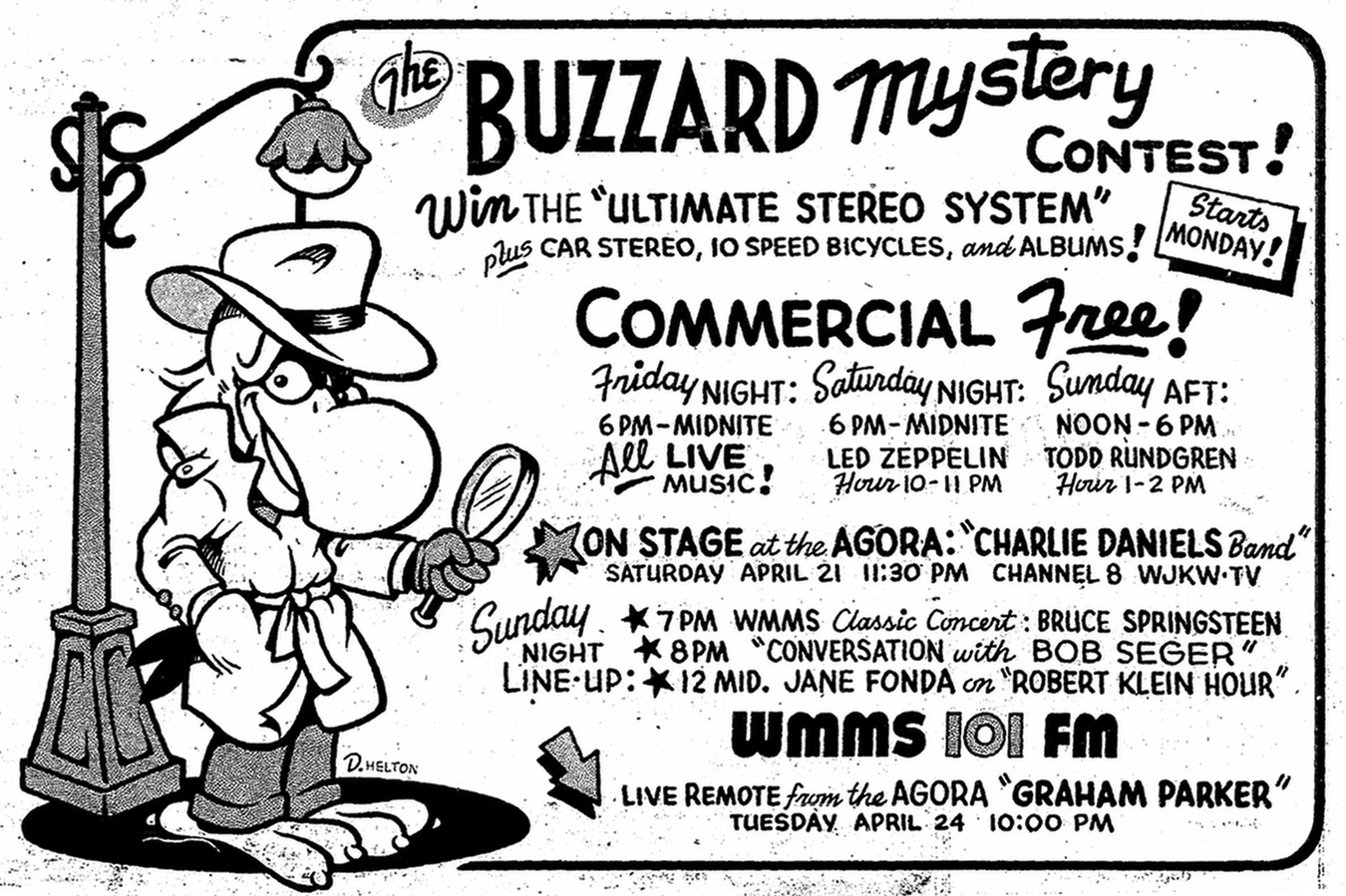
Print ad for radio station WMMS/Cleveland

The year 1979 saw a number of significant events in radio broadcasting history.

== Events ==
- March 25: Prokofiev's opera Maddalena receives its world premiere as a BBC Radio 3 broadcast (from a studio recording) in the UK, with Jill Gomez in the title role.
- September: KDWB-FM in Minneapolis, Minnesota breaks away from their Top 40 AM sister, becoming album-oriented rock as "K101".
- October 8-November 3: The engineers and airstaff of WCCO-AM-FM-TV go on strike.
- October 22: A Pittsburgh court receives a $7 million libel lawsuit from county politician Cyril Wecht over remarks the city controller made of him during a radio interview.
- Undated: In Albuquerque, New Mexico, long time rocker KRST flips to country music, becoming the city's first FM country radio station. KRST continues playing country music.

== Debuts ==
- February 5: Sears Radio Theater debuts on CBS in the United States.
- May 31: RTÉ Radio 2 signs on the air in the Republic of Ireland as a national pop music station: "Like Clockwork" by The Boomtown Rats is the first song on air, played by Larry Gogan.
- November 5: The radio news program Morning Edition premieres on National Public Radio in the United States.
- Undated: WIXK-FM signs on the air in Minneapolis–Saint Paul.

== Endings ==
- November 4: KUAC ends AM after 12 years. It is replaced by Morning Edition (see above in Debuts).

== Births ==
- May 4: Wes Butters, English broadcaster.
- July 23: Peter Rosenberg, American radio personality.

== Deaths ==
- April 9: Staats Cotsworth, 71, American actor perhaps best known for playing the title role in Casey, Crime Photographer.
- September 27: Gracie Fields, 81, English wartime singer, actress and broadcaster on BBC and Radio Luxembourg.
- October 27: Charles Coughlin, 88, Canadian-born Roman Catholic priest who used radio to reach a mass audience during the 1930s. This radio program included praises of Adolf Hitler and Benito Mussolini.
