= 1972 in radio =

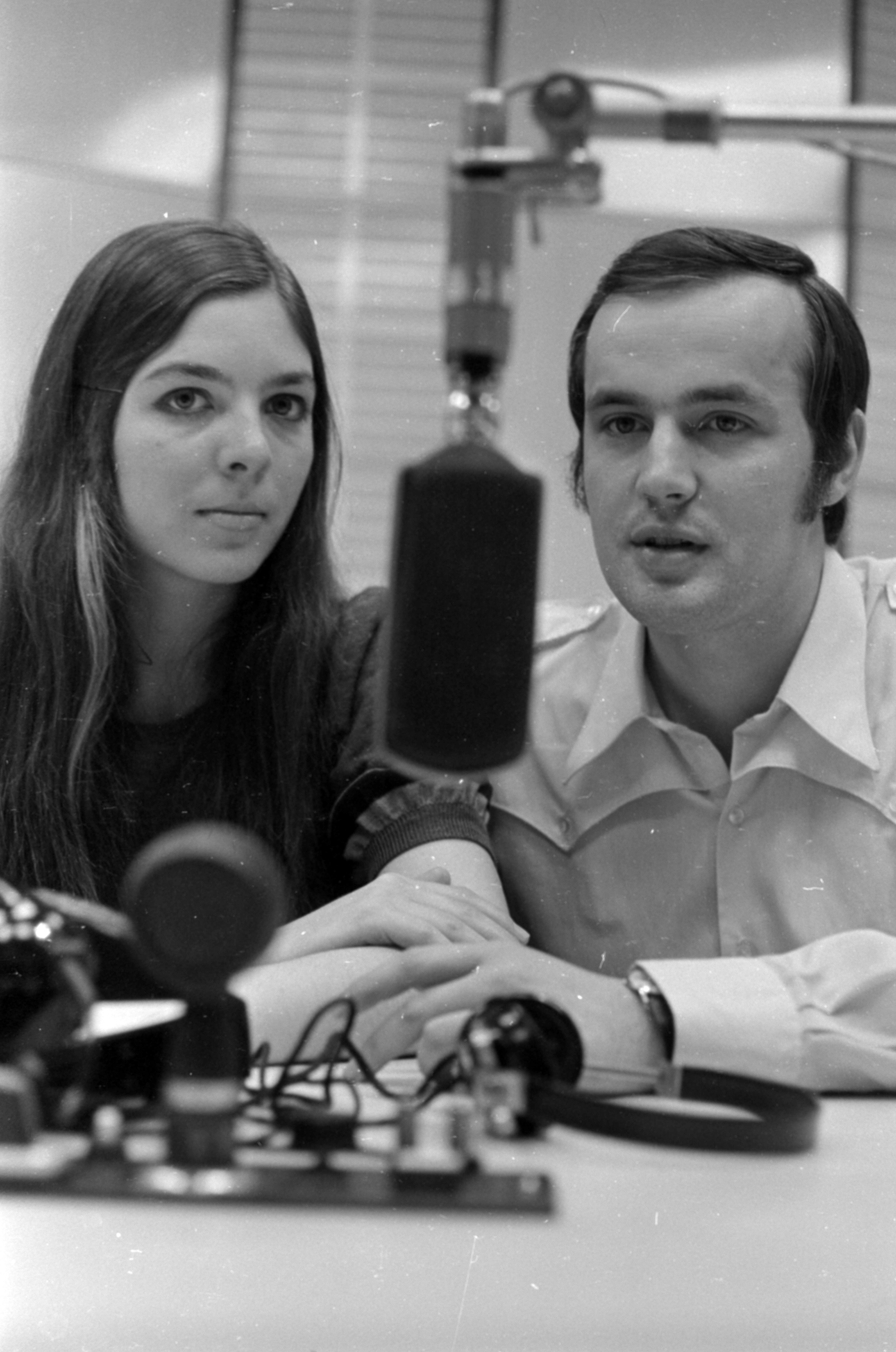
Mária Barra and András Ulbrich in the Budapest VIII. Hungarian Radio studio, 1972.

The year 1972 in radio involved some significant events.

== Events ==
- Two new Top 40 stations launch in major Canadian cities, as CFTR Toronto abandons its simulcast of beautiful music CHFI-FM for Top 40 early in the year, and in Ottawa, CKPM becomes CFGO on June 21.
- June 6 - KPOO-FM signs on in San Francisco, becoming the first black-owned non-commercial radio station in the western United States.
- July 7 – WCBS-FM in New York City debuts its Oldies format.
- August 28 – WOC-FM (103.7 FM) in Davenport, Iowa flips from a format that formatted beautiful music and also simulcasted WOC's AM signal to a contemporary hit radio format, and adopts the call sign KIIK-FM, or KIIK 104 as it would be known to fans. It is the Quad Cities market's first FM top 40 station and – with the advantage of an FM stereo signal – will be the first serious challenge to KSTT (1170 AM), the market's top-rated station at the time. The initial broadcast day was 5 a.m. to 12:30 a.m. before switching to 24 hours shortly after the new format began.
- November 19 – Seán Mac Stíofáin, chief of staff of the Provisional Irish Republican Army, is arrested for membership of the IRA in the Irish Republic after giving an interview on RTÉ's This Week radio programme. Fianna Fáil Minister for Posts and Telegraphs Gerry Collins dismisses the entire RTÉ authority for permitting the broadcast.

=== Also ===
- Bill and Becky Ann Stewart sell WPBC and WPBC-FM, both of Richfield, Minnesota, to Fairchild Industries. Later that year, both stations become WYOO.
- WDRQ Detroit, having debuted the previous year as a news/talk station, flips to Top 40, as does WAAM in nearby Ann Arbor (dropping its longtime MOR format). Detroit also loses a Top 40 station on April 25, 1972, as WKNR changes from "Keener 13" to beautiful music as WNIC, simulcast with its FM sister (formerly WKNR-FM).
- NBC sells off their Cleveland radio stations (WKYC-AM and WKYC-FM) to Ohio Communications, headed by Cleveland Indians, Cleveland Cavaliers and Cleveland Arena owner Nick Mileti, and radio executive Jim Embrescia. The stations were renamed "3WE" WWWE-AM and "M105" WWWM-FM, with the AM station attaining flagship rights to the Indians and Cavaliers, and hired pioneering sports/talk host Pete Franklin for "Sportsline."
- Metromedia sells off their Cleveland stations, WHK and WMMS, to the Detroit-based Malrite Communications Group. After protests and pleas from WMMS' devoted following, Malrite vows to maintain the FM stations' progressive rock format, and relocates their corporate headquarters to Cleveland. Farther west in Toledo, progressive rock fans get a Christmas gift as WCWA-FM becomes WIOT-FM on Christmas Day.
- Exiled Guatemalan activist Alaíde Foppa begins hosting Foro de la Mujer ('Women's Forum') on the UNAM radio station in Mexico, giving advice on domestic matters and recipes, addressing topics such as gender-related violence, parental alienation, reproductive rights and women's role in society.

== Debuts ==
- 'The Pop Chronicles Presents The Forties' on KSFO.

== Closings ==
- April 30 - Arthur Godfrey Time ends after a 27-year run.

== Births ==
- January 27 - Wynne Evans, Welsh singer and radio presenter
- March 9 - Spencer Howson, Australian radio announcer
- July 20 - Jay Barker, American and Canadian football player and Birmingham, Alabama radio personality
- November 9 - Doug Russell, American radio personality
- September 8 - Lisa Kennedy Montgomery, American disc jockey and political satirist

== Deaths ==
- January 1, Jane Morgan, 92, British-born American actress whose career encompassed concert halls, vaudeville, the legitimate stage, radio, television and film.
- January 10, Al Goodman, 81, American orchestra leader and music director for various radio network shows including The Ziegfeld Follies of the Air (1932), Palmolive Beauty Box Theater (1935–1937), Your Hit Parade (1935–1938), The Fred Allen Show (1945–1949) and his pet program, The Prudential Family.
- September 26, Charles Correll, 82, American radio comedian, best known for his work on the Amos 'n' Andy show with Freeman Gosden
- October 15, Douglas Smith, 48, English radio announcer.
- November 15, Freddie Grisewood, 84, English radio presenter.
