= 1975 in radio =

The year 1975 saw a number of significant events in radio broadcasting history.

== Events ==
- 1 January – KQV-Pittsburgh's new owner, Taft Broadcasting, hires Joey Reynolds as program director. KQV's Top 40 format is blown up, taking a bizarre, free-form approach dubbed "The Death of Radio!" Phonetically re-branded "Kay-Cue-Vee," regular newscasts are canceled, jingles are replaced with crudely produced "mingles," airplay of any Top 10 songs was avoided, daily names like "Barrel Bottom Radio," "Volkswagen Radio," "Channel 14," "AM Radio" and "Normalcy Radio" are used, and all of the deejays only said "KQV plays WAY too Much Music!" for a seven-day period, among other stunts. Reynolds, along with his hand-picked music director and morning host, are all fired in May, and the station reverts to the prior format.
- July – Country music station KRRV in Dallas, Texas, becomes Top 40 KIKM.
- 14 October – KQV in Pittsburgh ends its longtime Top 40 format, switching to all-news with NBC Radio's News & Information Service. Billy Soule and George Hart preside over the final airshift.
- 30 October – The "Voice of the Pittsburgh Pirates" for close to 30 seasons and a mainstay on American clear channel, Bob Prince, is shockingly fired by Pittsburgh station KDKA.
- 23 November – The Geneva Frequency Plan comes into effect.

Undated

- BBC Radio 2 in the U.K. begins broadcasting topical radio comedy sketch show The News Huddlines starring comedian Roy Hudd. Continuing until 2001, it will become British radio’s longest-running audience comedy.
- WLOL-FM in Minneapolis, Minnesota, flips from classical music to beautiful music.

== Debuts ==
- 22 January: Radio Forth begins broadcasting to the Edinburgh area
- 19 May: Plymouth Sound begins broadcasting to the Plymouth area
- 18 June: The NBC Radio Network launches the "News and Information Service," an all-news format that informally replaced Monitor; clearance is obtained on most of NBC's FM stations, as well as WRC (AM) in Washington.
- 24 June: Radio Tees (now TFM Radio) begins broadcasting to the Stockton-on-Tees area
- 3 July: Radio Trent (later Trent FM and 96 Trent FM, now reverted to Trent FM) beings broadcasting to the Nottingham area
- 16 September: Pennine Radio (now The Pulse) begins broadcasting to the Bradford area; the station extends its coverage to Huddersfield in 1984
- 14 October: Radio Victory begins broadcasting to the Portsmouth area
- 28 October: Radio Orwell (later merged with Saxon Radio to form SGR FM) begins broadcasting to the Ipswich area

== Closings ==
- 26 January: The last broadcast of NBC Radio's Monitor aired; the final two 'communicators' were Big Wilson and John Bartholomew Tucker.

== Births ==
- 13 January - George Duran, American chef, television host and radio personality
- 11 March - Eric the Midget, member of the Wack Pack from radio's The Howard Stern Show
- 17 March - Ebro Darden, American DJ and host of Ebro in the Morning
- 31 July - Stephanie Hirst, British radio presenter
- 23 September - Chris Hawkins, British radio presenter
- 2 December - Sam Bromley, news anchor and reporter for WSAR in Fall River, Massachusetts, and WFNR/WPSK in Radford, Virginia

== Deaths ==
- 3 January - Bess Johnson, c.72, American actress
- 12 January - Les Mitchel, 70, American radio and film producer, director and actor
- 3 April - Jacques Brown, 74, British radio comedy producer
- 28 April - Tom Donahue, 46, American Rock and Roll Hall of Fame radio disc jockey and freeform rock pioneer
- 16 May - Al Helfer, 63, American Major League Baseball announcer
- 5 August - James Jewell, 69, American radio actor, producer and director
- 10 November - William Hardcastle, 57, British radio news presenter
