= 1973 in radio =

The year 1973 saw a number of significant events in radio broadcasting history.

== Events ==
- 4 June – KFMH of Davenport, Iowa, flips from its beautiful music format to alternative rock, using the slogan "99 Plus." The first song is reportedly "I've Seen All Good People" by Yes. The new station quickly gains a cult following and a reputation for playing music and showcasing genres and local artists ignored by other stations.
- 15 October – Dutch public-broadcasting station Hilversum 3 begins round-the-clock transmission.

=== No dates ===
- KWNT-FM (106.5 FM) of Davenport, Iowa, switches from country music to beautiful music and light easy listening, with the new call letters KRVR (with the slogan "K-River"). The new format will become the signature of the frequency for the next 22 years, but leaves the Quad-Cities market without a full-time FM country music station for most of the next five years. KWNT's AM station (1580 AM) remains country.
- André Baruch and his wife move to Palm Beach, Florida, to do a top-rated daily four-hour talk show for five years before relocating to Beverly Hills, California.

== Debuts ==
- Unknown date – DWFM 92.3, owned by Nation Broadcasting Corporation in Manila, Philippines signs on the air, becoming the third FM station in the nation's capital.
- February 5 – WABB-FM in Mobile, Alabama, signs on, initially simulcasting its sister AM station and maintaining a top 40/CHR format until March 1, 2012. The first song played is "Stuck Inside of Mobile with the Memphis Blues Again" by Bob Dylan, which will be repeated upon WABB-FM's 2012 signoff.
- February 23 – DWLL in Manila, Philippines signs on the air as WLL 94.7 or Mellow Touch 94.7 one of the pioneer FM stations that does not have live announcers or music DJs in their programming.
- May 16 – URB 963, a student radio station at the University of Bath (England) begins broadcasting
- August 27 – WCCO-FM (later KMNB) relaunches with new 100,000 watt signal.
- October 6 – American Country Countdown, a country music-oriented version of American Top 40 featuring the top 40 songs of the week based on Billboard magazine's Hot Country Singles chart. Created by Don Bustany and Casey Kasem and distributed by Watermark Inc., the host is Don Bowman, who will remain with the program for 4½ years.
- October 8 – LBC (later London News 97.3, News Direct 97.3FM and LBC 97.3), the first Independent Local Radio station in the United Kingdom, begins broadcasting to the London area.
- October 16 – Capital Radio (later Capital FM and Capital 95.8) begins broadcasting to the London area.
- December 31 - Radio Clyde (later Clyde 1 and 102.5 Clyde 1), the first UK independent local radio station outside London, and the first in Scotland, begins broadcasting to the Glasgow area.

== Closings ==
- The Feminine Forum concept dropped by KGBS, becoming the Bill Ballance Show

== Births ==
- March 9 – Uribe DJ, Colombian radio personality and television host
- April 18 – Jad Abumrad, American radio host, co-founder of Radiolab on public radio
- June 22 – Carson Daly, American radio and television personality, host of Last Call with Carson Daly on NBC

== Deaths ==
- January 11 – Isabel Randolph, 83, American character actress in radio and film from the 1940s through the 1960s and in television from the early 1950s to the middle 1960s
- January 24 – J. Carroll Naish, 76, American character actor
- June 1 – Walter Greaza, 76, American actor
- June 6 – Jimmy Clitheroe, 51, English comic entertainer
- July 25 – Edgar Stehli, 89, American actor
- October 27 – Howard Marshall, 73, English radio commentator
