= List of The Shadow episodes =

This is an episode list for the adventure radio drama The Shadow. The series was inspired by an announcer character on the radio adaptation of Detective Story Magazine, an earlier anthology series that ran about 200 episodes and was spun off as a standalone series based on fan interest in the mysterious announcer.

The Shadow premiered on the Mutual Network on September 26, 1937 and ended on December 26, 1954. The 677 episodes aired over 18 seasons, including an additional summer series in the first season.

The seasons were of variable length: Season 1 through Season 8 were of 26-30 episodes, Season 9 through Season 12 were of 38-39 episodes, Season 13 through Season 17 were of 47-52 episodes, and the final Season 18 was of 22 episodes.

There are a number of lost episodes, over 60% of the total: 153 episodes are missing, six episodes are incomplete from seasons one through 12 and seasons 13 through 18 are entirely missing except for three episodes.

Radio scripts are available for the series including the missing episodes, except for the season 1 summer series, which is complete in recordings. Some of the missing episodes are available in preserved recordings of a 1940s Australian adaptation and in recordings of recreated stage readings collected by old-time radio enthusiasts.

== List of seasons ==
Season	Surviving episodes	Missing episodes	Episodes	Originally released	Lamont Cranston/ The Shadow	Margo Lane	Announcer
1	17	9	26 (total)	1937–1938	Orson Welles	Agnes Moorehead	Ken Roberts
1B	26	0	26 (total)	1938	Orson Welles	Margot Stevenson	Ken Roberts
2	25	1	26 (total)	1938–1939	William Johnstone	Agnes Moorehead	Ken Roberts
3	23; 1 incomplete	5; 1 incomplete	29 (total)	1939–1940	William Johnstone	Marjorie Anderson	Ken Roberts
4	29	1	30 (total)	1940–1941	William Johnstone	Jeanette Nolan	Ken Roberts
5	16; 1 incomplete	9; 1 incomplete	26 (total)	1941–1942	William Johnstone	Jeanette Nolan	Ken Roberts
6	6	20	26 (total)	1942–1943	William Johnstone	Jeanette Nolan	Ken Roberts
7	7	23	30 (total)	1943–1944	Bret Morrison	Marjorie Anderson	Ken Roberts
8	7	22	29 (total)	1944–1945	John Archer	Judith Allen	Don Hancock
9	23	16	39 (total)	1945–1946	Steve Cortleigh; Bret Morrison	Laura Mae Carpenter; Lesley Woods	Don Hancock; Robert Chase
10	14; 4 incomplete	20; 4 incomplete	39 (total)	1946–1947	Bret Morrison	Grace Matthews	Don Hancock
11	31	7	38 (total)	1947–1948	Bret Morrison	Grace Matthews	André Baruch
12	18	21	39 (total)	1948–1949	Bret Morrison	Grace Matthews	André Baruch
13	0	51	51 (total)	1949–1950	Bret Morrison	Gertrude Warner	Carl Caruso
14	0	51	51 (total)	1950–1951	Bret Morrison	Gertrude Warner	Carl Caruso
15	0	52	52 (total)	1951–1952	Bret Morrison	Gertrude Warner	Sandy Becker
16	0	51	51 (total)	1952–1953	Bret Morrison	Gertrude Warner	Sandy Becker
17	3	44	47 (total)	1953–1954	Bret Morrison	Gertrude Warner	Ted Mallie

== Season 1: (1937–1938) ==
No.	Title	Written by	Preservation	Original release date
1-01 (1)	"The Death House Rescue" "The Shadow"	—	Preserved	September 26, 1937
1-02 (2)	"The Red Macaw"	—	Lost--a script survives	October 3, 1937
1-03 (3)	"Danger in the Dark"	—	Lost	October 10, 1937
1-04 (4)	"Murder by the Dead"	—	Lost--Recreation exists	October 17, 1937
1-05 (5)	"The Temple Bells of Neban"	—	Preserved	October 24, 1937
1-06 (6)	"The Three Ghosts"	—	Preserved	October 31, 1937
1-07 (7)	"Death Rides the Skyway"	—	Lost	November 7, 1937
1-08 (8)	"Terror Island"	—	Lost	November 14, 1937
1-09 (9)	"The Ruby of Modoc"	—	Lost	November 21, 1937
1–10 (10)	"Circle of Death"	—	Preserved	November 28, 1937
1–11 (11)	"The House of Greed"	—	Lost	December 5, 1937
1–12 (12)	"The Death Triangle"	—	Preserved	December 12, 1937
1–13 (13)	"Cold Death"	—	Preserved	December 19, 1937
1–14 (14)	"The Voice of Death"	Carl L. Bixby	Lost	December 26, 1937
1–15 (15)	"Goddess of Death" "The Idol Talker"	—	Lost	January 2, 1938
1–16 (16)	"The League of Terror"	—	Preserved	January 9, 1938
1–17 (17)	"Sabotage"	—	Preserved	January 16, 1938
1–18 (18)	"The Society of the Living Dead"	—	Preserved	January 23, 1938
1–19 (19)	"The Poison Death"	—	Preserved	January 30, 1938
1–20 (20)	"The Phantom Voice"	—	Preserved	February 6, 1938
1–21 (21)	"The House of Horror"	—	Lost	February 13, 1938
1–22 (22)	"Hounds in the Hills"	—	Preserved	February 20, 1938
1–23 (23)	"The Plot Murder"	—	Preserved	February 27, 1938
1–24 (24)	"The Bride of Death"	—	Preserved	March 6, 1938
1–25 (25)	"The Silent Avenger"	—	Preserved	March 13, 1938
1–26 (26)	"The White Legion"	—	Preserved	March 20, 1938

== Season 1B: (1938 summer series) ==
No.	Title	Written by	Preservation	Original release date
1B-01 (27)	"The Hypnotized Audience"	—	Preserved	March 27, 1938
1B-02 (28)	"Death from the Deep"	—	Preserved	April 3, 1938
1B-03 (29)	"The Firebug"	—	Preserved	April 10, 1938
1B-04 (30)	"The Blind Beggar Dies"	—	Preserved	April 17, 1938
1B-05 (31)	"Power of the Mind"	—	Preserved	April 24, 1938
1B-06 (32)	"The White God"	—	Preserved	May 1, 1938
1B-07 (33)	"Aboard the Steamship Amazon"	—	Preserved	May 8, 1938
1B-08 (34)	"Murders in Wax"	—	Preserved	May 15, 1938
1B-09 (35)	"Message from the Hills"	—	Preserved	May 22, 1938
1B-10 (36)	"The Creeper"	—	Preserved	May 29, 1938
1B-11 (37)	"The Tenor with the Broken Voice"	—	Preserved	June 5, 1938
1B-12 (38)	"Murder on Approval"	—	Preserved	June 12, 1938
1B-13 (39)	"The Tomb of Terror"	—	Preserved	June 19, 1938
1B-14 (40)	"The Old People"	—	Preserved	June 26, 1938
1B-15 (41)	"The Voice of the Trumpet"	—	Preserved	July 3, 1938
1B-16 (42)	"He Died at Twelve"	—	Preserved	July 10, 1938
1B-17 (43)	"The Reincarnation of Michael"	—	Preserved	July 17, 1938
1B-18 (44)	"The Mark of the Bat"	—	Preserved	July 24, 1938
1B-19 (45)	"Revenge on the Shadow"	—	Preserved	July 31, 1938
1B-20 (46)	"The Mine Hunters"	—	Preserved	August 7, 1938
1B-21 (47)	"The Hospital Murders"	—	Preserved	August 14, 1938
1B-22 (48)	"The Caverns of Death"	—	Preserved	August 21, 1938
1B-23 (49)	"Death Under the Chapel"	—	Preserved	August 28, 1938
1B-24 (50)	"The Black Buddha"	—	Preserved	September 4, 1938
1B-25 (51)	"The Witch Drums of Salem"	—	Preserved	September 11, 1938
1B-26 (52)	"Professor X"	—	Preserved	September 18, 1938

== Season 2: (1938–1939) ==
No.	Title	Written by	Preservation	Original release date
2-01 (53)	"Traffic in Death"	—	Preserved	September 25, 1938
2-02 (54)	"The Black Abbot"	—	Preserved	October 2, 1938
2-03 (55)	"Death Stalks The Shadow"	—	Preserved	October 9, 1938
2-04 (56)	"Night Without End"	—	Preserved	October 16, 1938
2-05 (57)	"Gun Island"	—	Preserved	October 23, 1938
2-06 (58)	"The Isle of Fear"	—	Preserved	October 30, 1938
2-07 (59)	"Shyster Payoff"	—	Preserved	November 6, 1938
2-08 (60)	"Black Rock"	—	Preserved	November 13, 1938
2-09 (61)	"Death is Blind"	—	Preserved	November 20, 1938
2–10 (62)	"Fountain of Death"	—	Preserved	November 27, 1938
2–11 (63)	"Murder in E Flat"	—	Preserved	December 4, 1938
2–12 (64)	"Murder by Rescue"	—	Preserved	December 11, 1938
2–13 (65)	"Guest of Death"	—	Preserved	December 18, 1938
2–14 (66)	"Give Us This Day"	—	Lost	December 25, 1938
2–15 (67)	"The Man who Murdered Time"	—	Preserved	January 1, 1939
2–16 (68)	"Island of the Devil"	—	Preserved	January 8, 1939
2–17 (69)	"Ghosts Can Kill"	—	Preserved	January 15, 1939
2–18 (70)	"Valley of the Living Dead"	—	Preserved	January 22, 1939
2–19 (71)	"Prelude to Terror"	—	Preserved	January 29, 1939
2–20 (72)	"The Ghost of Captain Bayloe"	—	Preserved	February 5, 1939
2–21 (73)	"Hypnotic Death" "Design for Murder"	—	Preserved	February 12, 1939
2–22 (74)	"Friend of Darkness"	—	Preserved	February 19, 1939
2–23 (75)	"Horror in Wax"	—	Preserved	February 26, 1939
2–24 (76)	"Sabotage by Air" "Death by Violence"	—	Preserved	March 5, 1939
2–25 (77)	"Appointment with Death"	—	Preserved	March 12, 1938
2–26 (78)	"Can the Dead Talk?"	—	Preserved	March 19, 1939

== Season 3: (1939–1940) ==
No.	Title	Written by	Preservation	Original release date
3-01 (79)	"Dead Men Talk"	—	Preserved	September 24, 1939
3-02 (80)	"The Night Marauder"	Peter Wright	Preserved	October 1, 1939
3-03 (81)	"Murder in the Ball Park"	—	Preserved	October 8, 1939
3-04 (82)	"Village of Doom"	—	Preserved	October 15, 1939
3-05 (83)	"House of Fun"	—	Preserved	October 22, 1939
3-06 (84)	"Phantom Fingerprints"	—	Preserved	October 29, 1939
3-07 (85)	"Mansion of Madness"	—	Preserved	November 5, 1939
3-08 (86)	"The Inventor of Death"	—	Preserved	November 12, 1939
3-09 (87)	"The Shadow Returns"	—	Preserved	November 19, 1939
3–10 (88)	"The Sandhog Murders"	—	Preserved	November 26, 1939
3–11 (89)	"Death Shows the Way"	—	Preserved	December 3, 1939
3–12 (90)	"The Flight of the Vulture"	—	Preserved	December 10, 1939
3–13 (91)	"Murder Incorporated"	—	Preserved	December 17, 1939
3–14 (92)	"The Stockings Were Hung"	—	Preserved	December 24, 1939
3–15 (93)	"The Cat that Killed"	—	Preserved	December 31, 1939
3–16 (94)	"Murder in the Death House"	—	Preserved	January 7, 1940
3–17 (95)	"Suicide Resort"	—	Lost	January 14, 1940
3–18 (96)	"The Precipice Called Death"	—	Preserved	January 21, 1940
3–19 (97)	"Murder Host"	—	Lost	January 28, 1940
3–20 (98)	"The Return of Carnation Charlie"	—	Preserved	February 4, 1940
3–21 (99)	"Death is an Art"	—	Preserved	February 11, 1940
3–22 (100)	"Coinage of Death"	—	Incomplete	February 18, 1940
3–23 (101)	"The Great Submarine Mystery"	—	Lost	February 25, 1940
3–24 (102)	"Death on the Bridge"	—	Preserved	March 3, 1940
3–25 (103)	"The Laughing Corpse"	—	Preserved	March 10, 1940
3–26 (104)	"Murderer's Vanity"	—	Preserved	March 17, 1940
3–27 (105)	"The Plot that Failed"	—	Preserved	March 24, 1940
3–28 (106)	"Up from the Grave"	—	Lost	March 31, 1940
3–29 (107)	"Revenge Beyond Death"	—	Lost	April 7, 1940

== Season 4: (1940–1941) ==
No.	Title	Written by	Preservation	Original release date
4-01 (108)	"Death in a Minor Key"	—	Preserved	September 29, 1940
4-02 (109)	"Ghost Town"	—	Preserved	October 6, 1940
4-03 (110)	"The Isle of the Living Dead"	—	Preserved	October 13, 1940
4-04 (111)	"The Oracle of Death"	—	Preserved	October 20, 1940
4-05 (112)	"The Mark of the Black Widow"	—	Preserved	October 27, 1940
4-06 (113)	"The Creeper"	—	Preserved	November 3, 1940
4-07 (114)	"Carnival of Death"	—	Preserved	November 10, 1940
4-08 (115)	"The House of Horror"	—	Preserved	November 17, 1940
4-09 (116)	"The Green Man"	—	Preserved	November 24, 1940
4–10 (117)	"The Curse of Shiva"	—	Preserved	December 1, 1940
4–11 (118)	"The Voice of Death"	—	Preserved	December 8, 1940
4–12 (119)	"The Killer's Rendezvous"	—	Preserved	December 15, 1940
4–13 (120)	"Joey's Christmas Story"	—	Preserved	December 22, 1940
4–14 (121)	"The Ghost on the Stair"	—	Preserved	December 29, 1940
4–15 (122)	"The Leopard Strikes"	—	Preserved	January 5, 1941
4–16 (123)	"The Ghost Building"	—	Preserved	January 12, 1941
4–17 (124)	"The Shadow Challenged"	—	Preserved	January 19, 1941
4–18 (125)	"The Ghost of Caleb MacKenzie"	—	Preserved	January 26, 1941
4–19 (126)	"Nightmare at Gaelsberry"	—	Preserved	February 2, 1941
4–20 (127)	"The Man Who Lived Twice"	—	Preserved	February 9, 1941
4–21 (128)	"The Phantom Voyage"	—	Preserved	February 16, 1941
4–22 (129)	"The Chess Club Murders"	—	Preserved	February 23, 1941
4–23 (130)	"Death Rides a Broomstick"	—	Preserved	March 2, 1941
4–24 (131)	"Murder Underground"	—	Preserved	March 9, 1941
4–25 (132)	"The Ghost Walks Again"	—	Preserved	March 16, 1941
4–26 (133)	"Death Prowls at Night"	—	Preserved	March 23, 1941
4–27 (134)	"Voodoo"	—	Preserved	March 30, 1941
4–28 (135)	"Murder from the Grave" "Death from the Grave"	—	Preserved	April 6, 1941
4–29 (136)	"Death on the Rails"	—	Preserved	April 13, 1941
4–30 (137)	"The Case of the Dancing Elephant"	—	Lost	April 20, 1941

== Season 5: (1941–1942) ==
No.	Title	Written by	Preservation	Original release date
5-01 (138)	"Headsman of the Camerons"	—	Incomplete	September 28, 1941
5-02 (139)	"Assignment with Murder"	—	Lost	October 5, 1941
5-03 (140)	"Dragon's Tongue Murders"	—	Preserved	October 12, 1941
5-04 (141)	"The Hoodoo Ship"	—	Preserved	October 19, 1941
5-05 (142)	"The Devil's Hour"	—	Preserved	October 26, 1941
5-06 (143)	"The Terror by Night"	—	Lost	November 2, 1941
5-07 (144)	"The Organ Played at Midnight"	—	Preserved	November 9, 1941
5-08 (145)	"The Case of the Three Frightened Policemen"	—	Preserved	November 16, 1941
5-09 (146)	"The Ring of Light"	—	Preserved	November 23, 1941
5–10 (147)	"Beggars of Death"	—	Lost	November 30, 1941
5–11 (148)	"The Curse of Baldring Heights"	—	Lost	December 7, 1941
5–12 (149)	"The Undead"	—	Lost	December 14, 1941
5–13 (150)	"Death Imported"	—	Preserved	December 21, 1941
5–14 (151)	"The Case of the Priceless Pompano"	—	Lost	December 28, 1941
5–15 (152)	"Death Pulls the Strings"	—	Preserved	January 4, 1942
5–16 (153)	"The Drums of Doom"	—	Preserved	January 11, 1942
5–17 (154)	"The Thing in the Swamp"	—	Preserved	January 18, 1942
5–18 (155)	"Dead Man's Revenge"	—	Preserved	January 25, 1942
5–19 (156)	"The Return of Anatole Chevanic"	—	Preserved	February 1, 1942
5–20 (157)	"Design for Death"	—	Lost	February 8, 1942
5–21 (158)	"Death Speaks Twice"	—	Preserved	February 15, 1942
5–22 (159)	"Death Gives an Encore"	—	Preserved	February 22, 1942
5–23 (160)	"Dead Men Tell"	—	Preserved	March 1, 1942
5–24 (161)	"Death for a Messenger"	—	Lost	March 8, 1942
5–25 (162)	"Altar of Death"	—	Preserved	March 15, 1942
5–26 (163)	"Murder Deferred"	—	Lost	March 22, 1942

== Season 6: (1942–1943) ==
No.	Title	Written by	Preservation	Original release date
6-01 (164)	"The Red Room"	—	Lost	September 27, 1942
6-02 (165)	"Death Comes to the Magician"	—	Lost	October 4, 1942
6-03 (166)	"The Master Strikes"	—	Lost	October 11, 1942
6-04 (167)	"The Riddle of the Endless Cave"	—	Lost	October 18, 1942
6-05 (168)	"The Mystery of Madman's Deep"	—	Preserved	October 25, 1942
6-06 (169)	"Death Keeps a Deadline"	—	Preserved	November 1, 1942
6-07 (170)	"The Wailing Corpse"	—	Preserved	November 8, 1942
6-08 (171)	"Star of the Orient"	—	Lost	November 15, 1942
6-09 (172)	"The Lady in Black"	—	Preserved	November 22, 1942
6–10 (173)	"Death from the Sky"	—	Lost	November 29, 1942
6–11 (174)	"Death Shoots an Arrow"	—	Preserved	December 6, 1942
6–12 (175)	"The Bells Toll Death"	—	Lost	December 13, 1942
6–13 (176)	"The Case of the Talking Skull"	—	Lost	December 20, 1942
6–14 (177)	"The Case of the Phantom Werewolf"	—	Lost	December 27, 1942
6–15 (178)	"The Glowing Death"	—	Lost	January 3, 1943
6–16 (179)	"The League of Death"	—	Lost	January 10, 1943
6–17 (180)	"The Case of the Mechanical Monster"	—	Lost	January 17, 1943
6–18 (181)	"The Eyes of Death"	—	Lost	January 24, 1943
6–19 (182)	"Secret Weapon"	—	Lost	January 31, 1943
6–20 (183)	"The Song of Fear"	—	Lost	February 7, 1943
6–21 (184)	"The Mark of Cain"	—	Lost	February 14, 1943
6–22 (185)	"The Language of the Dead"	—	Lost	February 21, 1943
6–23 (186)	"The Touch of Death"	—	Preserved	February 28, 1943
6–24 (187)	"The Man Who Bought Life"	—	Lost	March 7, 1943
6–25 (188)	"The Crystal Globe" "The Crystal Screen"	—	Lost	March 14, 1943
6–26 (189)	"The Mystery of Snake House"	—	Lost	March 21, 1943

== Season 7: (1943–1944) ==
No.	Title	Written by	Preservation	Original release date
7-01 (190)	"The Gibbering Things"	Alonzo Deen Cole	Preserved	September 26, 1943
7-02 (191)	"The Crystal Globe"	—	Preserved	October 3, 1943
7-03 (192)	"Dolls of Death"	—	Lost	October 10, 1943
7-04 (193)	"The Weird Sisters"	Alonzo Deen Cole	Lost	October 17, 1943
7-05 (194)	"The Man Who Could Not Die"	Sidney Slon	Lost	October 24, 1943
7-06 (195)	"The Secret of Valhalla Lodge"	Dorothy Erwin	Lost	October 31, 1943
7-07 (196)	"Ship of Doom"	Max Ehrlich	Lost	November 7, 1943
7-08 (197)	"The Phantom in the Skyscraper"	Sidney Slon	Lost	November 14, 1943
7-09 (198)	"The Secret of The Shadow"	Max Ehrlich	Lost	November 21, 1943
7–10 (199)	"Death at Graveyard Post"	Alonzo Deen Cole	Lost	November 28, 1943
7–11 (200)	"Bubbling Death"	Eric Arthur	Preserved	December 5, 1943
7–12 (201)	"The Race with Death"	Sidney Slon	Lost	December 12, 1943
7–13 (202)	"Club of Doom"	Eric Arthur	Preserved	December 19, 1943
7–14 (203)	"The Juggernaut"	Max Ehrlich	Preserved	December 26, 1943
7–15 (204)	"The Black Serpent"	Alonzo Deen Cole	Lost	January 2, 1944
7–16 (205)	"The Case of the Immortal Beauty"	Robert Arthur	Lost	January 9, 1944
7–17 (206)	"Death Stalks at Night"	Sidney Slon	Lost	January 16, 1944
7–18 (207)	"The Red Domino"	Max Ehrlich	Lost	January 23, 1944
7–19 (208)	"The Case of the Avenging Brain"	Robert Arthur	Lost	January 30, 1944
7–20 (209)	"A Pass to Death"	Brian J. Byrne	Preserved	February 6, 1944
7–21 (210)	"Flames of Death"	Verne Jay	Lost	February 13, 1944
7–22 (211)	"The Hungry Hand"	Eric Arthur	Lost	February 20, 1944
7–23 (212)	"The Death Ride"	Joseph Cochran	Lost	February 27, 1944
7–24 (213)	"The House Where Madness Dwelt"	Sidney Slon	Lost	March 5, 1944
7–25 (214)	"Death to The Shadow"	David Kogan	Preserved	March 12, 1944
7–26 (215)	"Drums of Doom"	Eric Arthur	Preserved	March 19, 1944
7–27 (216)	"Death in the Tomb"	Verne Jay	Lost	March 26, 1944
7–28 (217)	"Death Makes the Headlines"	Sidney Slon	Lost	April 2, 1944
7–29 (218)	"A Date with Death"	Max Ehrlich	Lost	April 9, 1944
7–30 (219)	"Pattern for Crime"	Eric Arthur	Lost	April 16, 1944

== Season 8: (1944–1945) ==
No.	Title	Written by	Preservation	Original release date
8-01 (220)	"The Ebony Goddess"	Max Ehrlich	Lost	September 24, 1944
8-02 (221)	"The Sweepstakes Ticket"	Hector Chevigny	Lost	October 1, 1944
8-03 (222)	"Death Pays the Premiums"	Max Ehrlich	Lost	October 8, 1944
8-04 (223)	"The Rocks of Doom"	Max Ehrlich	Lost	October 15, 1944
8-05 (224)	"The Stolen Cab Racket"	Hector Chevigny	Lost	October 22, 1944
8-06 (225)	"Halloween in Vermont"	Catherine B. Stemler	Lost	October 29, 1944
8-07 (226)	"Murder in the Museum"	Stedman Coles	Lost	November 5, 1944
8-08 (227)	"Death Goes Fishing"	Stedman Coles	Lost	November 12, 1944
8-09 (228)	"The Man Who Dreamed Too Much"	Alfred Bester	Preserved	November 19, 1944
8–10 (229)	"The Man Who Wished Death"	Max Ehrlich	Lost	November 26, 1944
8–11 (230)	"The Lizard of Fire"	Alfred Bester	Lost	December 3, 1944
8–12 (231)	"The Immortal Murderer"	Alfred Bester	Lost	December 10, 1944
8–13 (232)	"The Ghost on Horseback"	Stedman Coles	Lost	December 17, 1944
8–14 (233)	"Merry Christmas by the Thousand"	Catherine B. Stemler	Lost	December 24, 1944
8–15 (234)	"The Phantom Brother"	Alfred Bester	Lost	December 31, 1944
8–16 (235)	"The Man with the Missing Memory"	—	Lost	January 7, 1945
8–17 (236)	"The Jekyll and Hyde Murders"	—	Lost	January 14, 1945
8–18 (237)	"Death Is Just Around the Corner"	Alfred Bester	Preserved	January 21, 1945
8–19 (238)	"The Invisible Alibi"	Joseph Cochran	Lost	January 28, 1945
8–20 (239)	"Lucifer Has a Plan"	Stedman Coles	Lost	February 4, 1945
8–21 (240)	"The Face of Death"	—	Preserved	February 11, 1945
8–22 (241)	"The Night Marauders"	Peter Wright	Lost	February 18, 1945
8–23 (242)	"The Disappearing Corpse"	Stedman Coles	Lost	February 25, 1945
8–24 (243)	"The Mother Goose Bandit"	Alfred Bester	Lost	March 4, 1945
8–25 (244)	"The Brief Fame of John Copper"	Alfred Bester	Preserved	March 11, 1945
8–26 (245)	"The Case of the Flaming Skull"	Alfred Bester	Preserved	March 18, 1945
8–27 (246)	"The Destroyer"	Alfred Bester	Preserved	March 25, 1945
8–28 (247)	"The Sword of Dengri-La"	Bob Shaw	Lost	April 1, 1945
8–29 (248)	"The Little Man Who Wasn't There"	Alfred Bester	Preserved	April 8, 1945

== Season 9: (1945–1946) ==
No.	Title	Written by	Preservation	Original release date
9-01 (249)	"The Shadow in Danger"	Stedman Coles	Lost	September 9, 1945
9-02 (250)	"The Thoughts of Death"	Stedman Coles	Lost	September 16, 1945
9-03 (251)	"Death in the Darkness"	Stedman Coles	Lost	September 23, 1945
9-04 (252)	"The Heartbeats of Death"	Stedman Coles	Lost	September 30, 1945
9-05 (253)	"Blind Man's Folly"	Stedman Coles	Lost	October 7, 1945
9-06 (254)	"The Murdering Ghost"	Stedman Coles	Lost	October 14, 1945
9-07 (255)	"Out of this World"	Joe Bates Smith	Preserved	October 21, 1945
9-08 (256)	"I Must Never Sleep Again"	Peter Barry	Lost	October 28, 1945
9-09 (257)	"Spotlight on the Duchess"	Joe Bates Smith	Preserved	November 4, 1945
9–10 (258)	"Spider Boy"	Joe Bates Smith	Preserved	November 11, 1945
9-11 (259)	"Death Rises Out of the Sea"	Joe Bates Smith	Lost	November 18, 1945
9–12 (260)	"The Four Giants of Amsterdam"	Peter Barry	Lost	November 25, 1945
9–13 (261)	"Murder by Candlelight"	Joe Bates Smith	Preserved	December 2, 1945
9–14 (262)	"Relax and Murder"	Henry Denker	Lost	December 9, 1945
9–15 (263)	"Ship of the Living Dead"	William L. Stuart	Lost	December 16, 1945
9–16 (264)	"Three Crimes on Christmas Eve"	Joe Bates Smith	Lost	December 23, 1945
9–17 (265)	"Back From the Grave"	Frank Kane	Lost	December 30, 1945
9–18 (266)	"The Creature that Kills"	Tom Everett	Lost	January 6, 1946
9–19 (267)	"Murder in the Carnival"	Joe Bates Smith	Lost	January 13, 1946
9–20 (268)	"Curse of the Cat"	Lawrence Crowley	Preserved	January 20, 1946
9–21 (269)	"Dream of Death"	Eric Arthur	Preserved	January 27, 1946
9–22 (270)	"Murder with Music"	Joe Bates Smith	Preserved	February 3, 1946
9–23 (271)	"The Living Head"	Frank Kane	Preserved	February 10, 1946
9–24 (272)	"Murder for Money"	Joe Bates Smith	Preserved	February 17, 1946
9–25 (273)	"The Hiss of Death"	Joe Bates Smith	Lost	February 24, 1946
9–26 (274)	"Island of Ancient Death"	Gibson Scott Fox	Preserved	March 3, 1946
9–27 (275)	"Ghost Without A Face"	Joe Bates Smith	Preserved	March 10, 1946
9–28 (276)	"Etched With Acid"	Frank Kane	Preserved	March 17, 1946
9–29 (277)	"The Walking Corpse"	Eric Arthur	Preserved	March 24, 1946
9–30 (278)	"Mind Over Murder"	Joe Bates Smith	Preserved	March 31, 1946
9–31 (279)	"The Ghost Wore A Silver Slipper"	Lawrence Crowley	Preserved	April 7, 1946
9–32 (280)	"The Unburied Dead"	Frank Kane	Preserved	April 14, 1946
9–33 (281)	"The Gorilla Man"	Joe Bates Smith	Preserved	April 21, 1946
9–34 (282)	"The Dreams of Death"	Stedman Coles	Preserved	April 28, 1946
9–35 (283)	"The White Witchman of Lawaiki"	Joe Bates Smith	Preserved	May 5, 1946
9–36 (284)	"The Bride Wore Black"	Joe Bates Smith	Preserved	May 12, 1946
9–37 (285)	"The Touch of Death"	Stedman Coles	Preserved	May 19, 1946
9–38 (286)	"They Kill With A Silver Hatchet"	Joe Bates Smith	Preserved	May 26, 1946
9–39 (287)	"Death in a Minor Key"	Tom Wilson	Preserved	June 2, 1946

== Season 10: (1946–1947) ==
No.	Title	Written by	Preservation	Original release date
10-01 (288)	"Vampires Prowl by Night"	Gibson Scott Fox	Lost	September 8, 1946
10-02 (289)	"The Killer on High Cliff Road"	Joe Bates Smith	Lost	September 15, 1946
10-03 (290)	"Die Lover—Die!"	Gibson Scott Fox	Lost	September 22, 1946
10-04 (291)	"Death Rides the Merry-Go-Round"	Joe Bates Smith	Lost	September 29, 1946
10-05 (292)	"The Valley of the Living Terror"	Joe Bates Smith	Preserved	October 13, 1946
10-06 (293)	"Blood Money"	Frank Kane	Preserved	October 20, 1946
10-07 (294)	"Cave of the Zombies"	William Morwood	Lost	October 27, 1946
10-08 (295)	"Murder for Blackmail"	Stedman Coles	Lost	November 3, 1946
10-09 (296)	"The Corpse Without A Skin"	Gibson Scott Fox	Lost	November 10, 1946
10-10 (297)	"The Phantom of the Haunted Steeple"	Evan Wylie	Lost	November 17, 1946
10–11 (298)	"Gang Doctor"	Frank Kane	Preserved	November 24, 1946
10–12 (299)	"Makeup for Murder"	Joe Bates Smith	Preserved	December 1, 1946
10–13 (300)	"The Devil Takes A Wife"	Gibson Scott Fox	Preserved	December 8, 1946
10–14 (301)	"Murders on the Main Stem"	William Morwood	Preserved	December 15, 1946
10–15 (302)	"The Fine Art of Murder"	Joe Bates Smith	Preserved	December 22, 1946
10–16 (303)	"The Shadow of Suspicion"	Evan Wylie	Preserved	December 29, 1946
10–17 (304)	"The Werewolf of Hamilton Mansion"	Guy de Vry	Preserved	January 5, 1947
10–18 (305)	"The Cat and the Killer"	Lewis Reed	Preserved	January 12, 1947
10–19 (306)	"A Game of Murder"	Frank Kane	Lost	January 19, 1947
10–20 (307)	"Death by Imagination"	William Morwood	Incomplete	January 26, 1947
10–21 (308)	"Scent of Death"	Frank Kane	Preserved	February 2, 1947
10–22 (309)	"Murder Marriage"	Evan Wylie	Lost	February 9, 1947
10–23 (310)	"Death Takes the Long Count"	Frank Kane	Lost	February 16, 1947
10–24 (311)	"The Witch of the Crescent Moon"	William Morwood	Incomplete	February 23, 1947
10–25 (312)	"The Devil Fans the Flame"	Frank Kane	Lost	March 2, 1947
10–26 (313)	"The Mystery Ship"	Guy de Vry	Lost	March 9, 1947
10–27 (314)	"Murder by Appointment"	Frank Kane	Lost	March 16, 1947
10–28 (315)	"Death by Clockwork"	Evan Wylie	Lost	March 23, 1947
10–29 (316)	"Crime in a Minor Key"	Frank Kane	Lost	March 30, 1947
10–30 (317)	"The Great White Way to Death"	Frank Kane	Lost	April 6, 1947
10–31 (318)	"Death is the Keeper"	William Morwood	Lost	April 13, 1947
10–32 (319)	"Murder Express"	Evan Wylie	Lost	April 20, 1947
10–33 (320)	"Death Takes a Fadeout"	Frank Kane	Incomplete	April 27, 1947
10–34 (321)	"Suicide League"	Guy de Vry	Incomplete	May 4, 1947
10–35 (322)	"The Shadow's Revenge"	Frank Kane	Preserved	May 11, 1947
10–36 (323)	"Death Rides High"	Frank Kane	Preserved	May 18, 1947
10–37 (324)	"Seance with Death"	Frank Kane	Preserved	May 25, 1947
10–38 (325)	"Spider Boy"	Joe Bates Smith	Preserved	June 1, 1947
10–39 (326)	"Air Freight Fracas"	Frank Kane	Preserved	June 8, 1947

== Season 11: (1947–1948) ==
No.	Title	Written by	Preservation	Original release date
11-01 (327)	"The Phantom of the Lighthouse"	William Morwood	Preserved	September 7, 1947
11-02 (328)	"When the Grave is Open"	Frank Kane	Preserved	September 14, 1947
11-03 (329)	"The Face"	Max Ehrlich	Preserved	September 21, 1947
11-04 (330)	"Death Takes the Wheel"	Frank Kane	Preserved	September 28, 1947
11-05 (331)	"The Curse of the Gypsies"	William Morwood	Preserved	October 5, 1947
11-06 (332)	"The Ruby of Karvahl"	Peter Barry	Preserved	October 19, 1947
11-07 (333)	"Death Hunt"	Guy de Vry	Preserved	October 26, 1947
11-08 (334)	"Death Has Eight Arms"	William Morwood	Preserved	November 2, 1947
11-09 (335)	"Dream of Death"	Frederic Baldus	Preserved	November 9, 1947
11-10 (336)	"Doom and the Limping Man"	Peter Barry	Preserved	November 16, 1947
11-11 (337)	"The Comic Strip Killer"	Herb Baumgartner	Preserved	November 23, 1947
11–12 (338)	"Murder and the Medium"	Peter Barry	Preserved	November 30, 1947
11–13 (339)	"Death Has Sharp Claws"	Frank Kane	Lost	December 7, 1947
11–14 (340)	"The Three Mad Sisters of Lonely Hollow"	Bud Baldus	Lost	December 14, 1947
11–15 (341)	"A Gift of Murder"	Peter Barry	Preserved	December 21, 1947
11–16 (342)	"The Terrible Legend of Crownshield Castle"	Herb Baumgartner	Preserved	December 28, 1947
11–17 (343)	"The Chill of Death"	Louis Vittes	Preserved	January 4, 1948
11–18 (344)	"The Bones of the Dragon"	Gibson Scott Fox	Preserved	January 11, 1948
11–19 (345)	"Death and the Black Fedora"	Peter Barry	Preserved	January 18, 1948
11–20 (346)	"The House that Death Built"	Alfred Bester	Preserved	January 25, 1948
11–21 (347)	"One Dead and Two to Go"	Frank Kane	Preserved	February 1, 1948
11–22 (348)	"The Thing in the Cage"	Herb Baumgartner	Preserved	February 8, 1948
11–23 (349)	"The Terror at Wolf's Head Knoll"	Peter Barry	Preserved	February 15, 1948
11–24 (350)	"The Nursery Rhyme Murders"	Max Ehrlich	Preserved	February 22, 1948
11–25 (351)	"The Man Who Was Death"	Alfred Bester	Preserved	February 29, 1948
11–26 (352)	"The Beast of Darrow House"	Peter Barry	Preserved	March 7, 1948
11–27 (353)	"Stake Out"	Frank Kane	Preserved	March 14, 1948
11–28 (354)	"Death Coils to Strike"	Herb Baumgartner	Preserved	March 21, 1948
11–29 (355)	"Death and the Easter Bonnet"	Peter Barry	Preserved	March 28, 1948
11–30 (356)	"The Ghost that Gleams"	Louis Vittes	Preserved	April 4, 1948
11–31 (357)	"The Mystery of the Fatal Flowers"	Herb Baumgartner	Lost	April 11, 1948
11–32 (358)	"The Geni and the Honorable Thieves"	Peter Barry	Lost	April 18, 1948
11–33 (359)	"The Dark Horse Called Death"	Frank Kane	Lost	April 25, 1948
11–34 (360)	"The Legend of the Living Swamp"	Herb Baumgartner	Preserved	May 2, 1948
11–35 (361)	"Reflection of Death"	Louis Vittes	Preserved	May 9, 1948
11–36 (362)	"The Giant of Madras"	Peter Barry	Preserved	May 16, 1948
11–37 (363)	"Flight Through Darkness"	Herb Baumgartner	Lost	May 23, 1948
11–38 (364)	"Ruby of Karvahl"	Peter Barry	Lost	May 30, 1948

== Season 12: (1948–1949) ==
No.	Title	Written by	Preservation	Original release date
12-01 (365)	"Murder at Dead Man's Inn"	Peter Barry	Preserved	September 12, 1948
12-02 (366)	"Revenge Is—Murder!"	Frank Kane	Preserved	September 19, 1948
12-03 (367)	"Death Is A Colored Dream"	Louis Vittes	Preserved	September 26, 1948
12-04 (368)	"The Phantom Racketeer"	Frank Kane	Preserved	October 3, 1948
12-05 (369)	"A Mask for Murder"	Edward J. Adamson	Preserved	October 10, 1948
12-06 (370)	"Dead Man's Ride"	Michael Cramoy	Preserved	October 17, 1948
12-07 (371)	"The Drum of Obi"	Peter Barry	Preserved	October 24, 1948
12-08 (372)	"Murder by a Corpse"	Edward J. Adamson	Preserved	October 31, 1948
12-09 (373)	"Evil in the House"	Frank Kane	Preserved	November 7, 1948
12-10 (374)	"Death and the Throttler of Havenmoor"	Peter Barry	Lost	November 14, 1948
12-11 (375)	"The Uncaged Terror"	Edward J. Adamson	Lost	November 21, 1948
12-12 (376)	"The Wig Makers of Doom Street"	Frank Kane	Preserved	November 28, 1948
12–13 (377)	"The Laughing Dead"	Peter Barry	Lost	December 5, 1948
12–14 (378)	"The Head of Doom"	Frank Kane	Lost	December 12, 1948
12–15 (379)	"The Lost Dead"	Peter Barry	Lost	December 19, 1948
12–16 (380)	"Murder Marked Merry Christmas"	Frank Kane	Lost	December 26, 1948
12–17 (381)	"Death and the Crown of Odalph"	Peter Barry	Preserved	January 2, 1949
12–18 (382)	"The Disciple of Death"	Edward Adamson	Lost	January 9, 1949
12–19 (383)	"The Sabbath of the Talons"	Peter Barry	Lost	January 16, 1949
12–20 (384)	"Death and the Double Cross"	Frank Kane	Lost	January 23, 1949
12–21 (385)	"The House of the Ravens"	Peter Barry	Lost	January 30, 1949
12–22 (386)	"The Half Dead Corpse"	Edward J. Adamson	Lost	February 6, 1949
12–23 (387)	"Minotou the Avenger"	Peter Barry	Lost	February 13, 1949
12–24 (388)	"Trail of the Knifer"	Peter Barry	Preserved	February 20, 1949
12–25 (389)	"The Collectors of Death"	Frank Kane	Preserved	February 27, 1949
12–26 (390)	"Unto Death Do Us Part"	Edward J. Adamson	Preserved	March 6, 1949
12–27 (391)	"The Ring of Mahlalayee"	Peter Barry	Preserved	March 13, 1949
12–28 (392)	"The Big Ace"	Frank Kane	Lost	March 20, 1949
12–29 (393)	"The Darkcliff Terror"	Frank Kane	Lost	March 27, 1949
12–30 (394)	"Creature of Darkness"	Edward J. Adamson	Lost	April 3, 1949
12–31 (395)	"Hear No Evil"	Merrit W. Barnum	Lost	April 10, 1949
12–32 (396)	"Death and the Easter Bonnet"	Peter Barry	Preserved	April 17, 1949
12–33 (397)	"Partners in Crime"	Frank Kane	Lost	April 24, 1949
12–34 (398)	"The Double Slug Killer"	Peter Barry	Lost	May 1, 1949
12–35 (399)	"The Buddha and the Snarling Dog"	Peter Barry	Lost	May 8, 1949
12–36 (400)	"Trial by Fire"	Edward Adamson	Lost	May 15, 1949
12–37 (401)	"Murder Counts Ten"	Frank Kane	Lost	May 22, 1949
12–38 (402)	"Monkey Woman"	Peter Barry	Preserved	May 29, 1949
12–39 (403)	"Preview of Terror"	Frank Kane	Preserved	June 5, 1949

== Season 13: (1949–1950) ==
No.	Title	Written by	Preservation	Original release date
13-01 (404)	"The Secret of the Hidden Room"	Sidney Slon	Lost	September 11, 1949
13-02 (405)	"The Big Break"	Frank Kane	Lost	September 18, 1949
13-03 (406)	"The Death Peddlers"	Frank Kane	Lost	September 25, 1949
13-04 (407)	"Death Tips the Odds"	Edward J. Adamson	Lost	October 2, 1949
13-05 (408)	"The Phantom Rider"	Peter Barry	Lost	October 9, 1949
13-06 (409)	"The Whispering Killer"	Frank Kane	Lost	October 23, 1949
13-07 (410)	"The House of Deadly Dreams"	Alfred Bester	Lost	October 30, 1949
13-08 (411)	"The Bloody Alley Incident"	Frank Kane	Lost	November 6, 1949
13-09 (412)	"The Three Queens of Death"	Peter Barry	Lost	November 13, 1949
13-10 (413)	"Deadline"	Sidney Slon	Lost	November 20, 1949
13-11 (414)	"The Man with No Face"	Alfred Bester	Lost	November 27, 1949
13-12 (415)	"The Ghost from Chinatree"	Peter Barry	Lost	December 4, 1949
13-13 (416)	"The Nightmare of the Ghouls"	Frank Kane	Lost	December 11, 1949
13–14 (417)	"The Slipper of Death"	Alfred Bester	Lost	December 18, 1949
13–15 (418)	"The Christmas Ghost"	Peter Barry	Lost	December 25, 1949
13–16 (419)	"Resolution of Death"	Edward J. Adamson	Lost	January 1, 1950
13–17 (420)	"The Monster of Blackmire"	Sidney Slon	Lost	January 8, 1950
13–18 (421)	"The Bride of Death"	Peter Barry	Lost	January 15, 1950
13–19 (422)	"The Ritual of the Hoof"	Alfred Bester	Lost	January 22, 1950
13–20 (423)	"The Girl and the Doomed Tiara"	Peter Barry	Lost	January 29, 1950
13–21 (424)	"Dead Head"	Frank Kane	Lost	February 5, 1950
13–22 (425)	"The Bride of the Knotted Cord"	Peter Barry	Lost	February 12, 1950
13–23 (426)	"The Man with the Burning Head"	Alfred Bester	Lost	February 19, 1950
13–24 (427)	"The Stroke of Doom"	Edward J. Adamson	Lost	February 26, 1950
13–25 (428)	"The Dynamite Dummy"	Alfred Bester	Lost	March 5, 1950
13–26 (429)	"The Hound of the Long-Dead Lady"	Peter Barry	Lost	March 12, 1950
13–27 (430)	"The Curse of the Great Nirvan"	Sidney Slon	Lost	March 19, 1950
13–28 (431)	"The Four Forgotten Hours"	Alfred Bester	Lost	March 26, 1950
13–29 (432)	"The Insidious Serpent"	Edward J. Adamson	Lost	April 2, 1950
13–30 (433)	"The Case of the Curious Easter"	Edward J. Adamson	Lost	April 9, 1950
13–31 (434)	"The Case of the Hanging Ghost"	Frank Kane	Lost	April 16, 1950
13–32 (435)	"Death Is Your Destination"	Alfred Bester	Lost	April 23, 1950
13–33 (436)	"Night of Terror"	Edward J. Adamson	Lost	April 30, 1950
13–34 (437)	"The Other World of Death"	Alfred Bester	Lost	May 7, 1950
13–35 (438)	"The Guest Named Murder"	Alfred Bester	Lost	May 14, 1950
13–36 (439)	"Murder by Scandal"	Frank Kane	Lost	May 21, 1950
13–37 (440)	"The Man Out of Time"	Alfred Bester	Lost	May 28, 1950
13–38 (441)	"Death and the Duchess"	Frank Kane	Lost	June 4, 1950
13–39 (442)	"(title unknown)"	—	Lost	June 11, 1950
13–40 (443)	"Corpse in a Straw Hat"	John Roeburt	Lost	June 18, 1950
13–41 (444)	"The Lost Mind of Death"	Alfred Bester	Lost	June 25, 1950
13–42 (445)	"(title unknown)"	—	Lost	July 2, 1950
13–43 (446)	"The Mark of the Shark"	—	Lost	July 9, 1950
13–44 (447)	"The Curious Corpse"	Max Ehrlich	Lost	July 16, 1950
13–45 (448)	"Date with Death"	Gail Ingram	Lost	July 23, 1950
13–46 (449)	"The Big Boss"	Joseph Ruscoll	Lost	July 30, 1950
13–47 (450)	"The Trail of Treachery"	Jerry McGill	Lost	August 6, 1950
13–48 (451)	"Death Strikes Out"	Gail Ingram	Lost	August 13, 1950
13–49 (452)	"(title unknown)"	—	Lost	August 20, 1950
13–50 (453)	"Murder on Wheels"	Jerry McGill	Lost	August 27, 1950
13–51 (454)	"The Man Who Mailed Murder"	Alfred Bester	Lost	September 3, 1950

== Season 14: (1950–1951) ==
No.	Title	Written by	Preservation	Original release date
14-01 (455)	"Ring of Death"	Gail Ingram	Lost	September 10, 1950
14-02 (456)	"Death Plays A Repeat"	Alfred Bester	Lost	September 17, 1950
14-03 (457)	"Messenger of Death"	Edward J. Adamson	Lost	September 24, 1950
14-04 (458)	"The Fix"	Edward J. Adamson	Lost	October 1, 1950
14-05 (459)	"The Gambler"	Max Ehrlich	Lost	October 15, 1950
14-06 (460)	"The Chamber of Death"	Max Ehrlich	Lost	October 22, 1950
14-07 (461)	"The Ten Dollar Corpse"	Stedman Coles	Lost	October 29, 1950
14-08 (462)	"The Gift of Gold"	Jerry McGill	Lost	November 5, 1950
14-09 (463)	"Career in Crime"	Edward J. Adamson	Lost	November 12, 1950
14-10 (464)	"Death is a Double Shadow"	Alfred Bester	Lost	November 19, 1950
14-11 (465)	"Flowers for a Corpse"	Gail Ingram	Lost	November 26, 1950
14-12 (466)	"The Cobra"	Edward J. Adamson	Lost	December 3, 1950
14-13 (467)	"The Forgotten Corpse"	Gail Ingram	Lost	December 10, 1950
14-14 (468)	"The Broker of Treason"	Alfred Bester	Lost	December 17, 1950
14–15 (469)	"Out by Christmas"	Gail Ingram	Lost	December 24, 1950
14–16 (470)	"Murder by Midnight"	Gail Ingram	Lost	December 31, 1950
14–17 (471)	"The Treasonous Triple Cross"	Edward J. Adamson	Lost	January 7, 1951
14–18 (472)	"(title unknown)"	—	Lost	January 14, 1951
14–19 (473)	"Double Death"	Gail Ingram	Lost	January 21, 1951
14–20 (474)	"The Friday Fugue"	John Lennox	Lost	January 28, 1951
14–21 (475)	"Man Trap"	Gail Ingram	Lost	February 4, 1951
14–22 (476)	"Cargo of Death"	Edward J. Adamson	Lost	February 11, 1951
14–23 (477)	"The Land Pirates"	Edward J. Adamson	Lost	February 18, 1951
14–24 (478)	"The Lisp of Death"	John Lennox	Lost	February 25, 1951
14–25 (479)	"Listed for Death"	Dewitt Copp	Lost	March 4, 1951
14–26 (480)	"The Unwilling Bridegroom"	Burt Brazier	Lost	March 11, 1951
14–27 (481)	"The Bartering Bride"	Edward J. Adamson	Lost	March 18, 1951
14–28 (482)	"The Sound of Poison"	John Lennox	Lost	March 25, 1951
14–29 (483)	"The Golden Deceiver"	—	Lost	April 1, 1951
14–30 (484)	"The Terror Squad"	—	Lost	April 8, 1951
14–31 (485)	"The Thought of Murder"	Gail Ingram	Lost	April 15, 1951
14–32 (486)	"Crime in Cash"	Edward J. Adamson	Lost	April 22, 1951
14–33 (487)	"(title unknown)"	—	Lost	April 29, 1951
14–34 (488)	"Murder by a Hair"	Gail Ingram	Lost	May 6, 1951
14–35 (489)	"Death is a Quack"	John Lennox	Lost	May 13, 1951
14–36 (490)	"Trial by Fire"	Edward J. Adamson	Lost	May 20, 1951
14–37 (491)	"The Deadly Pawn"	Edward J. Adamson	Lost	May 27, 1951
14–38 (492)	"The Red Chain"	Alfred Bester	Lost	June 3, 1951
14–39 (493)	"The Curator of Murder"	Alfred Bester	Lost	June 10, 1951
14–40 (494)	"The Twin-Engine Terror"	Edward J. Adamson	Lost	June 17, 1951
14–41 (495)	"Terror in the Night"	Edward J. Adamson	Lost	June 24, 1951
14–42 (496)	"The Loom of Death"	Alfred Bester	Lost	July 1, 1951
14–43 (497)	"Crime on Wheels"	Edward J. Adamson	Lost	July 8, 1951
14–44 (498)	"Death on the Diamond"	Edward J. Adamson	Lost	July 15, 1951
14–45 (499)	"Swamp Creature"	Edward J. Adamson	Lost	July 22, 1951
14–46 (500)	"Last Will and Testament"	Edward J. Adamson	Lost	July 29, 1951
14–47 (501)	"The Death of Father Neptune"	Alfred Bester	Lost	August 5, 1951
14–48 (502)	"Vacation from Murder"	Alfred Bester	Lost	August 12, 1951
14–49 (503)	"The Ten Thousand Dollar Fish"	Alfred Bester	Lost	August 19, 1951
14–50 (504)	"The Lively Corpse"	Edward J. Adamson	Lost	August 26, 1951
14–51 (505)	"The Deadly Design"	Edward J. Adamson	Lost	September 2, 1951

== Season 15: (1951–1952) ==
No.	Title	Written by	Preservation	Original release date
15-01 (506)	"The Absolute Alibi"	Jonathan Lewis	Lost	September 9, 1951
15-02 (507)	"The Curious Ottoman"	Edward J. Adamson	Lost	September 16, 1951
15-03 (508)	"Invitation to Murder"	Edward J. Adamson	Lost	September 23, 1951
15-04 (509)	"Bet with Death"	Gail Ingram	Lost	September 30, 1951
15-05 (510)	"Factory of Death"	Alfred Bester	Lost	October 7, 1951
15-06 (511)	"A Mind for Murder"	Edward J. Adamson	Lost	October 14, 1951
15-07 (512)	"The Deadly Bargain"	Edward J. Adamson	Lost	October 21, 1951
15-08 (513)	"Revenge by Special Delivery"	Alfred Bester	Lost	October 28, 1951
15-09 (514)	"The Final Curtain"	John Roeburt	Lost	November 4, 1951
15-10 (515)	"Record of Murder"	Harry Ingram	Lost	November 11, 1951
15-11 (516)	"The Perilous Portrait"	Edward J. Adamson	Lost	November 18, 1951
15-12 (517)	"The Sound of Dying"	Alfred Bester	Lost	November 25, 1951
15-13 (518)	"The Dance of Death"	Edward J. Adamson	Lost	December 2, 1951
15-14 (519)	"Material Witness"	Edward J. Adamson	Lost	December 9, 1951
15-15 (520)	"The Search for the Rose Kiss"	Alfred Bester	Lost	December 16, 1951
15–16 (521)	"The Doll with the Yellow Hair"	Harry Ingram	Lost	December 23, 1951
15–17 (522)	"The Eve of Murder"	John Roeburt	Lost	December 30, 1951
15–18 (523)	"Time to Kill"	Edward J. Adamson	Lost	January 6, 1952
15–19 (524)	"The Case of the Cardboard Club"	Alfred Bester	Lost	January 13, 1952
15–20 (525)	"Journey to Danger"	Harry Ingram	Lost	January 20, 1952
15–21 (526)	"Death Rides the Range"	Edward J. Adamson	Lost	January 27, 1952
15–22 (527)	"The Memory of Murder"	Alfred Bester	Lost	February 3, 1952
15–23 (528)	"Motive for Murder"	Harry Ingram	Lost	February 10, 1952
15–24 (529)	"Murder by Proxy"	Edward J. Adamson	Lost	February 17, 1952
15–25 (530)	"Vacation with Death"	Harry Ingram	Lost	February 24, 1952
15–26 (531)	"Murder on Time"	Jonathan Lewis	Lost	March 2, 1952
15–27 (532)	"The Curious Mr. Jill"	Alfred Bester	Lost	March 9, 1952
15–28 (533)	"The Fall Girl"	Edward J. Adamson	Lost	March 16, 1952
15–29 (534)	"The Ghoul of Darkmoor Graveyard"	Max Ehrlich	Lost	March 23, 1952
15–30 (535)	"Sometimes Death Wears Medals"	Alfred Bester	Lost	March 30, 1952
15–31 (536)	"The High Death"	Edward J. Adamson	Lost	April 6, 1952
15–32 (537)	"Murderous Counterfeit"	Edward J. Adamson	Lost	April 13, 1952
15–33 (538)	"The Blue Plague"	Max Ehrlich	Lost	April 20, 1952
15–34 (539)	"The White Eyes of Death"	Stedman Coles	Lost	April 27, 1952
15–35 (540)	"The Black Pool"	Max Ehrlich	Lost	May 4, 1952
15–36 (541)	"Death is the Master"	Max Ehrlich	Lost	May 11, 1952
15–37 (542)	"The Terror at Seacliff Castle"	J.G. Leighton	Lost	May 18, 1952
15–38 (543)	"Murder Always Kills Twice"	Alfred Bester	Lost	May 25, 1952
15–39 (544)	"The Demon of Devil's Cove"	Jerry McGill	Lost	June 1, 1952
15–40 (545)	"The Silent Killer"	Judith and David Bublick	Lost	June 8, 1952
15–41 (546)	"Death Walks Underground"	Max Ehrlich	Lost	June 15, 1952
15–42 (547)	"The Terrified Wife"	James Erthein	Lost	June 22, 1952
15–43 (548)	"The Case of the Heavenly Body"	Judith and David Bublick	Lost	June 29, 1952
15–44 (549)	"The Deadly Doll"	Edward J. Adamson	Lost	July 6, 1952
15–45 (550)	"The Plans of Death"	Jonathan Lewis	Lost	July 13, 1952
15–46 (551)	"The Curse of the Emerald Scarab"	J.G. Leighton	Lost	July 20, 1952
15–47 (552)	"The Mystery of the Murdering Host"	J.G. Leighton	Lost	July 27, 1952
15–48 (553)	"The Restless Corpse"	Edward J. Adamson	Lost	August 3, 1952
15–49 (554)	"The Silent Watch of Death"	James Erthein	Lost	August 10, 1952
15–50 (555)	"The Mad Dog Murders"	Jerry McGill	Lost	August 17, 1952
15–51 (556)	"Case of the Vanishing Baseball Player"	Judith and David Bublick	Lost	August 24, 1952
15–52 (557)	"Death by Proxy"	Stedman Coles	Lost	August 31, 1952

== Season 16: (1952–1953) ==
No.	Title	Written by	Preservation	Original release date
16-01 (558)	"The Eleventh Hour"	Jerry McGill	Lost	September 7, 1952
16-02 (559)	"The Black Witch of Hightower"	Max Ehrlich	Lost	September 14, 1952
16-03 (560)	"The Mystery of Angkor Vat"	Tex Edmondson	Lost	September 21, 1952
16-04 (561)	"The Forest of Death"	James Erthein	Lost	September 28, 1952
16-05 (562)	"The Secret of the Grisly Coffin"	J.G. Leighton	Lost	October 12, 1952
16-06 (563)	"The Fourth Strike is Death"	Judith and David Bublick	Lost	October 19, 1952
16-07 (564)	"The Case of the Twisted Mystery"	J.G. Leighton	Lost	October 26, 1952
16-08 (565)	"(title unknown)"	—	Lost	November 2, 1952
16-09 (566)	"Death is a Glass House"	Alfred Bester	Lost	November 9, 1952
16-10 (567)	"The Queen of Death"	James Erthein	Lost	November 16, 1952
16-11 (568)	"The Fangs of Death"	Jerry McGill	Lost	November 23, 1952
16-12 (569)	"The Dancing Doll of Death"	James Erthein	Lost	November 30, 1952
16-13 (570)	"The Beast of Falcon Square"	J.G. Leighton	Lost	December 7, 1952
16-14 (571)	"Escape to Death"	Judith and David Bublick	Lost	December 14, 1952
16-15 (572)	"The Case of the Santa Claus Killer"	J.G. Leighton	Lost	December 21, 1952
16-16 (573)	"Voyage into Darkness"	Tex Edmondson	Lost	December 28, 1952
16–17 (574)	"The Queen of Asia"	Max Ehrlich	Lost	January 4, 1953
16–18 (575)	"The Valley of the Black Totem"	James Erthein	Lost	January 11, 1953
16–19 (576)	"The Man Who Died Four Times"	J.G. Leighton	Lost	January 18, 1953
16–20 (577)	"The Thing in the Cage"	Judith and David Bublick	Lost	January 25, 1953
16–21 (578)	"The Chill of Death"	Jerry McGill	Lost	February 1, 1953
16–22 (579)	"The Meteor"	—	Lost	February 8, 1953
16–23 (580)	"Phone Call of Death"	Jonathan Lewis	Lost	February 15, 1953
16–24 (581)	"Death by the Dozen"	James Erthein	Lost	February 22, 1953
16–25 (582)	"Death Makes a Wish"	James Erthein	Lost	March 1, 1953
16–26 (583)	"Rendezvous with Death"	David and Judith Bublick	Lost	March 8, 1953
16–27 (584)	"(title unknown)"	—	Lost	March 15, 1953
16–28 (585)	"The Dark Cellar"	Max Ehrlich	Lost	March 22, 1953
16–29 (586)	"The Crying Kitten"	Jerry McGill	Lost	March 29, 1953
16–30 (587)	"The Marsh Murders"	Jerry McGill	Lost	April 5, 1953
16–31 (588)	"The Death Master"	J.G. Leighton	Lost	April 12, 1953
16–32 (589)	"The Torch"	Max Ehrlich	Lost	April 19, 1953
16–33 (590)	"Rendezvous with Doom"	Max Ehrlich	Lost	April 26, 1953
16–34 (591)	"White Angel of Death"	David and Judith Bublick	Lost	May 3, 1953
16–35 (592)	"Murder will Speak"	Bret Morrison	Lost	May 10, 1953
16–36 (593)	"The Case of the Living Dead"	David and Judith Bublick	Lost	May 17, 1953
16–37 (594)	"The Shadow of a Doubt"	J.G. Leighton	Lost	May 24, 1953
16–38 (595)	"Auction of Death"	Max Ehrlich	Lost	May 31, 1953
16–39 (596)	"The Ring of Zanlaghora"	Peter Barry	Lost	June 7, 1953
16–40 (597)	"The Howling Beast"	J.G. Leighton	Lost	June 14, 1953
16–41 (598)	"The Invisible Weapon"	David and Judith Bublick	Lost	June 21, 1953
16–42 (599)	"Policy of Death"	Max Ehrlich	Lost	June 28, 1953
16–43 (600)	"One Shoe Off"	David and Judith Bublick	Lost	July 5, 1953
16–44 (601)	"Full House for Murder"	Max Ehrlich	Lost	July 12, 1953
16–45 (602)	"Killer of the Stone Jungle"	Max Ehrlich	Lost	July 19, 1953
16–46 (603)	"Three Must Die"	Judith and David Bublick	Lost	July 26, 1953
16–47 (604)	"Hex Marks the Spot"	Jerry McGill	Lost	August 2, 1953
16–48 (605)	"The Kidnapped Equation"	Frank Phares	Lost	August 9, 1953
16–49 (606)	"The Smuggler's Secret"	Colin Christian	Lost	August 16, 1953
16–50 (607)	"The Green Star of Lhasa"	David and Judith Bublick	Lost	August 23, 1953
16–51 (608)	"Death Rings a Requiem"	Max Ehrlich	Lost	August 30, 1953

== Season 17: (1953–1954) ==
No.	Title	Written by	Preservation	Original release date
17-01 (609)	"Chalice of Quetzecoatl"	Sidney Slon	Lost	September 6, 1953
17-02 (610)	"Stand-In for Murder"	Jerry McGill	Lost	September 13, 1953
17-03 (611)	"The Mystery of the Stage Door Killer"	J.G. Leighton	Lost	September 20, 1953
17-04 (612)	"(title unknown)"	—	Lost	September 27, 1953
17-05 (613)	"Death from the East"	Judith and David Bublick	Lost	October 4, 1953
17-06 (614)	"Murder at the Coliseum"	Judith and David Bublick	Lost	October 11, 1953
17-07 (615)	"Death and the Twin Cadavers"	Peter Barry	Lost	October 18, 1953
17-08 (616)	"The Hangman's Noose"	Tex Edmondson	Lost	October 25, 1953
17-09 (617)	"Murder and the Ghost of Vengeance"	Peter Barry	Lost	November 1, 1953
17-10 (618)	"Mystery of the Man-Eating Marsh"	J.G. Leighton	Lost	November 8, 1953
17-11 (619)	"The Gray Ghost"	Max Ehrlich	Lost	November 15, 1953
17-12 (620)	"To Be or Not to Be – Dead"	Max Ehrlich	Lost	November 22, 1953
17-13 (621)	"Death and the Viking Groom"	Peter Barry	Lost	November 29, 1953
17-14 (622)	"The Curse of the Catletts"	Jonathan Lewis	Lost	December 6, 1953
17-15 (623)	"The Grip of Death"	Max Ehrlich	Lost	December 13, 1953
17-16 (624)	"The Mask of Death"	Judith and David Bublick	Lost	December 20, 1953
17-17 (625)	"The Little Big Shot"	Tex Edmondson	Lost	December 27, 1953
17–18 (626)	"(title unknown)"	—	Lost	January 3, 1954
17–19 (627)	"Phantom of the Swamp"	Tex Edmondson	Lost	January 10, 1954
17–20 (628)	"The Valley of Death"	Judith and David Bublick	Lost	January 17, 1954
17–21 (629)	"Death Draws the Bow"	Judith and David Bublick	Lost	January 24, 1954
17–22 (630)	"Death and the Terror at Ravenscote"	Max Ehrlich	Lost	January 31, 1954
17–23 (631)	"The Face of Death"	Jerry McGill	Lost	February 7, 1954
17–24 (632)	"Murder of the Mind"	Jerry McGill	Lost	February 14, 1954
17–25 (633)	"The Terror at Cazatan"	Jonathan Lewis	Lost	February 21, 1954
17–26 (634)	"The Crawling Death"	Bret Morrison	Lost	February 28, 1954
17–27 (635)	"Footprints of Death"	Judith and David Bublick	Lost	March 7, 1954
17–28 (636)	"I.O.U. Death"	Jerry McGill	Lost	March 14, 1954
17–29 (637)	"Voice of Death"	Judith and David Bublick	Preserved	March 21, 1954
17–30 (638)	"Death in the Deep"	Jerry McGill	Preserved	March 28, 1954
17–31 (639)	"Murder Walks by Night"	Robert Arthur	Lost	April 4, 1954
17–32 (640)	"Struggle with Death"	Judith and David Bublick	Lost	April 11, 1954
17–33 (641)	"Bells of St. Peter's"	Judith and David Bublick	Lost	April 18, 1954
17–34 (642)	"The Horror in the Night"	Peter Barry	Lost	April 25, 1954
17–35 (643)	"The Defender"	Max Ehrlich	Lost	May 2, 1954
17–36 (644)	"The Manhunter"	Jerry McGill	Lost	May 9, 1954
17–37 (645)	"The Model Murder"	Jerry McGill	Lost	May 16, 1954
17–38 (646)	"The Orchid"	Max Ehrlich	Lost	May 23, 1954
17–39 (647)	"Master of Torture"	Alfred Bercovici	Lost	May 30, 1954
17–40 (648)	"The Vision of Death"	Jerry McGill	Lost	June 6, 1954
17–41 (649)	"Temple of Death"	Judith and David Bublick	Lost	June 13, 1954
17–42 (650)	"Death Paints a Picture"	Robert Arthur	Lost	June 20, 1954
17–43 (651)	"The Vengeance of Angela Nolan"	Jonathan Lewis	Preserved	June 27, 1954
17–44 (652)	"Death by Chapter"	Jerry McGill	Lost	July 4, 1954
17–45 (653)	"Death Rides the Subway"	Max Ehrlich	Lost	July 11, 1954
17–46 (654)	"Death and the Conjure Man"	Milt Gelman	Lost	July 18, 1954
17–47 (655)	"The Case of the Dead Man's Shoes"	Judith and David Bublick	Lost	July 25, 1954

== Season 18: (1954) ==
No.	Title	Written by	Preservation	Original release date
18-01 (656)	"Murder in the Sun"	Jerry McGill	Lost--a script survives	August 1, 1954
18-02 (657)	"The Case of the Vanishing Killer"	J.G. Leighton	Lost--a script survives	August 8, 1954
18-03 (658)	"Murder in C Sharp Minor"	Max Ehrlich	Lost	August 15, 1954
18-04 (659)	"The Eyes of the God"	Alfred Bercovici	Lost	August 22, 1954
18-05 (660)	"The Blackball Murder"	Jerry McGill	Lost--a script survives	August 29, 1954
18-06 (661)	"Heartbeat of Death"	Judith and David Bublick	Lost--a script survives	September 5, 1954
18-07 (662)	"No Corpse for the Killer"	Jerry McGill	Lost	September 12, 1954
18-08 (663)	"The Nightmare Combination"	Milt Gelman	Lost--a script survives	September 19, 1954
18-09 (664)	"Visions of Death"	Judith and David Bublick	Lost	September 26, 1954
18-10 (665)	"The Cult of Death"	Alfred Bercovici	Lost	October 3, 1954
18-11 (666)	"Murder Before the Storm"	Jerry McGill	Lost--a script survives	October 10, 1954
18-12 (667)	"The Hands of Death"	Judith and David Bublick	Lost--a script survives	October 17, 1954
18-13 (668)	"Tunnel of Terror"	Jerry McGill	Lost--a script survives	October 24, 1954
18-14 (669)	"The Final Hour"	Jerry McGill	Lost--a script survives	October 31, 1954
18-15 (670)	"The Long Arm of Death"	—	Lost--a script survives	November 7, 1954
18-16 (671)	"The Corpse with the Lying Face"	Jerry McGill	Lost	November 14, 1954
18-17 (672)	"Cross Currents of Death"	Judith and David Bublick	Lost	November 21, 1954
18-18 (673)	"(title unknown)"	—	Lost	November 28, 1954
18–19 (674)	"Murder by Proxy"	Judith and David Bublick	Lost	December 5, 1954
18–20 (675)	"The Cloth of Death"	Jonathan Lewis	Lost	December 12, 1954
18–21 (676)	"Happy Doomsday"	Jerry McGill	Lost	December 19, 1954
18–22 (677)	"Murder by the Sea"	Judith and David Bublick	Lost	December 26, 1954

== Notes ==
Radio Spirits, the company that officially releases episodes of The Shadow on CD, has been releasing their collections with various newly found episodes and titling them as "Lost Shows".

Among these episodes are the complete second summer season starring Orson Welles as The Shadow. Eleven episodes were newly discovered that had not been heard since the original broadcasts:

- "The Old People" 06-26-38,
- "The Voice of the Trumpet" 07-03-38,
- "He Died at Twelve" 07-10-38,
- "The Reincarnation of Michael" 07-17-38,
- "The Mark of the Bat" 07-24-38,
- "Revenge on the Shadow" 07-31-38,
- "The Mine Hunters" 08-07-38,
- "The Hospital Murders" 08-14-38,
- "The Black Buddha" 09-04-38,
- "The Witch Drums" 09-11-38,
- "Professor X" 09-18-38

On the latest collection "Crime Does Not Pay", two more lost shows starring Bill Johnstone are included:

- "Fountain of Death" 11-27-38,
- "Murder by Rescue" 12-11-38

The list on this page does not include episode "The Case of the River of Eternal Woe", which was scheduled to air 04-15-1945, but was preempted due to news coverage of the death of President Roosevelt. The episode never aired and the recording is lost but a script survives.
