= 1946 in radio =

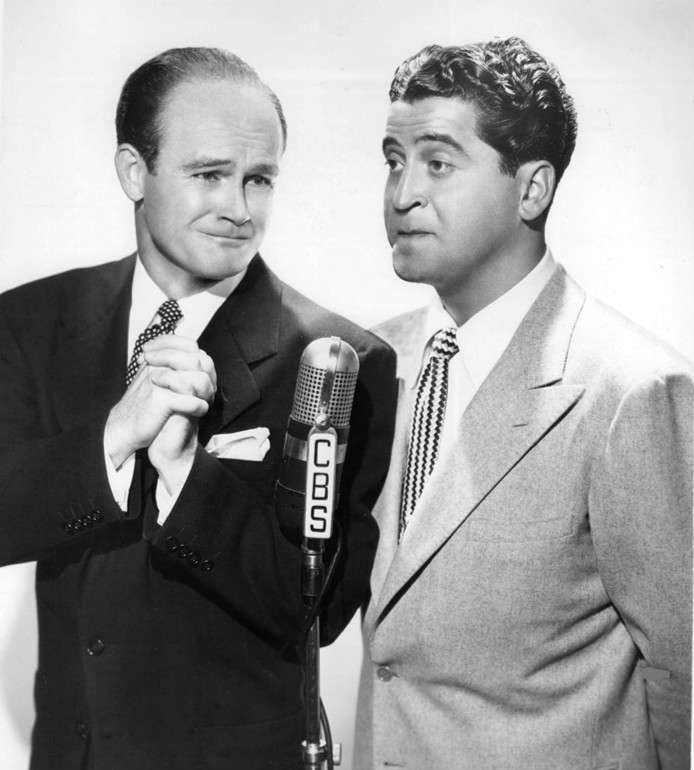
Bob Sweeney (left) and Hal March (right) from their radio program "Sweeney and March" in 1946

The year 1946 saw a number of significant events in radio broadcasting history.

== Events ==
- 20 January – British composer Sir Granville Bantock writes to fellow composer Rutland Boughton, criticising the BBC Music Department's attitude towards some newer composers.
- 15 July – The Elizalde brothers together with Bertrand Silen, establish Metropolitan Broadcasting Corporation, and at the same time KZRH returns to the air, broadcasting from the Insular Building, Binondo, City of Manila, Philippines. KZRH's comeback will feature the first ever Filipino language dramas on radio postwar while retaining programming from NBC Radio in a nod to its prewar affiliation.
- 1 September – The Norwegian Radio Orchestra (Kringkastingsorkestret) is founded.
- 5 September – In Berlin Rundfunk im amerikanischen Sektor (RIAS, "Broadcasting in the American Sector") begins mediumwave transmissions. The station, established by the US occupation authorities, had begun its activities on 7 February as the wire-broadcasting service DIAS (Drahtfunk im amerikanischen Sektor). The RIAS Symphonie-Orchester is also founded this year.
- 29 September – The BBC Third Programme is launched in the UK as a cultural channel.
- 3 November – In Italy, RAI reorganizes its stations into two new national networks, the Rete Rossa and the Rete Azzurra.
- 31 December – BBC General Forces Programme closes down.
- Bush DAC90 bakelite radio introduced in the United Kingdom: it becomes the best-selling model for some years.

== Debuts ==
- 7 January – The Second Mrs. Burton daytime serial debuts on CBS.
- 21 January
  - The Fat Man (radio) debuts on ABC.
  - I Deal in Crime debuts on ABC.
- 1 February - Holiday and Company debuts on CBS.
- 2 February – Twenty Questions debuts on Mutual.
- 4 March – Bob Elson on Board the Century debuts on Mutual.
- 24 March – BBC Home Service radio in the United Kingdom broadcasts Alistair Cooke's first American Letter. As Letter from America, this programme will continue until a few weeks before Cooke's death in 2004.
- 30 March – Academy Award Theater debuts on CBS.
- 2 April – Ed Sullivan's Pipelines debuts on the Blue Network.
- 5 April - Passport to Romance debuts on Mutual.
- 21 April – The Amazing Mrs. Danberry debuts on CBS.
- 29 April – Forever Ernest debuts on CBS.
- 3 June – Winner Take All debuts on CBS.
- 12 June – Author Meets the Critics debuts on Mutual.
- 27 June – By Popular Demand debuts on Mutual.
- 5 July – Hawk Durango debuts on CBS.
- 12 July – The Adventures of Sam Spade, Detective debuts on ABC.
- 29 July - Fighting Senator debuts on CBS.
- 18 August – Danger, Dr. Danfield debuts on ABC
- 3 September – The Cresta Blanca Hollywood Players debuts on CBS.
- 8 September – The Bickersons debuts on NBC.
- 18 September – The Ford Show debuts on CBS.
- 29 September – Are These Our Children? debuts on ABC.
- 3 October – Hawk Larabee (a revamping of Hawk Durango) debuts on CBS.
- 4 October – Sparkle Time debuts on CBS.
- 5 October – KERA, Dallas, Texas, begins broadcasting.
- 7 October – The BBC Light Programme in the U.K. transmits the first episode of the daily magazine programme Woman's Hour (initially presented by Alan Ivimey), which will still be running 75 years later, and of the daily adventure serial Dick Barton – Special Agent.
- 14 October - Broadway Talks Back debuts on Mutual.
- 16 October – Philco Radio Time starring Bing Crosby makes its debut on the ABC network, with Bob Hope appearing as Bing's first guest; the show is recorded using large wax transcription disks. In 1947, the Crosby show will introduce taped broadcasting to primetime network radio.
- 18 October – Let George Do It debuts on Mutual-Don Lee Network on the West Coast.
- 30 October – The Affairs of Ann Scotland debuts on ABC.
- 3 November – The Clock debuts on ABC.
- 27 November – WBET Brockton, Massachusetts signs on the air with a high school football game on 990 kHz. WBET would later take over fellow Brockton station WBKA's license and frequency of 1450 kHz.
- 2 December – Crime Club debuts on Mutual.

== Closings ==
- 6 January – The Charlotte Greenwood Show ends its run on network radio (ABC).
- 15 January – Johnny Presents ends its run on network radio (NBC).
- 18 January – Blind Date ends its run on network radio (NBC).
- 13 March – Auction Gallery ends its run on network radio (Mutual).
- 15 March – Constance Bennett Calls on You ends its run on network radio (ABC).
- 18 April – The Avenger ends its run in syndication.
- 26 April – Amanda of Honeymoon Hill ends its run on network radio (CBS).
- 30 May – The Bird's Eye Open House ends its run on network radio (NBC).
- 9 June – The Electric Hour ends its run on network radio (CBS).
- 16 June – The Amazing Mrs. Danberry ends its run on network radio (CBS).
- 20 June – Island Venture ends its run on network radio (CBS).
- 22 July – Forever Ernest ends its run on network radio (CBS).
- 31 August - An Evening with Romberg ends its run on network radio (NBC).
- 21 September – The Adele Clark Show ends its run on network radio (ABC).
- 21 September – The Billie Burke Show ends its run on network radio (CBS).
- 27 September – Cimarron Tavern ends its run on network radio (CBS).
- 30 September – Ed Sullivan's Pipelines ends its run on network radio (Blue Network).
- 11 October – Barry Cameron ends its run on network radio (NBC).
- 14 November – By Popular Demand ends its run on network radio (Mutual).
- 18 December – Academy Award ends its run on network radio (CBS).

== Births ==
- 25 January – Pete Price, British media personality and radio presenter
- 17 April – Henry Kelly, Irish-born broadcast presenter
- 7 May – Michael Rosen, British children's poet and radio presenter
- 10 June – Ed Blaylock, American voice actor and radio announcer
- 18 September – Ray Didinger, American sportswriter, author, film writer, radio co-host and television sports commentator, member of the Pro Football Hall of Fame (Writer's Honor Roll)
- 7 October – Jenny Abramsky, BBC Director of Audio and Music
- 15 December – Rodney Bingenheimer, entertainment personality and radio disc jockey on KROQ-FM in Los Angeles
- 21 December – Tom Keith, American public radio sound effects man for A Prairie Home Companion (died 2011)
- Sue Limb, English scriptwriter

== Deaths ==
- 3 January – William Joyce, 39, American-born Nazi propagandist (executed)
- 13 June – Major Bowes, 71, American radio personality
- 16 October – Granville Bantock, 78, British composer
