= 1945 in radio =

The year 1945 saw a number of significant happenings in radio broadcasting history.

== Events ==
- 30 January – Adolf Hitler makes his last public speech to be delivered personally, on broadcast radio, expressing the belief that Germany will triumph in World War II.
- 15 March – The Academy Awards are broadcast on the radio in their entirety for the first time, on ABC and the Armed Forces Radio.
- 23 March – The Orchestre National de la Radiodiffusion Francaise is reformed under the auspices of the French national public service broadcaster.
- 8 April – Buchenwald concentration camp prisoner Gwidon Damazyn sends pleas for help over a clandestinely-constructed shortwave radio transmitter in morse code to the approaching Third United States Army.
- 12 April
  - The death of President Franklin D. Roosevelt interrupts programming on radio networks in the United States. On CBS, John Charles Daly interrupts his narration of Wilderness Road to read the wire message.
  - CBS correspondent Edward R. Murrow accompanies elements of the Third United States Army to the liberation of Buchenwald concentration camp, making a memorable broadcast on 15 April on his experience ("I saw it, but will not describe it.")
- 15 April – BBC correspondent Richard Dimbleby accompanies the British 11th Armoured Division to the liberation of Bergen-Belsen concentration camp, making one of the first reports from there. His description of what he sees ("the world of a nightmare") is so graphic, the BBC declines to broadcast his dispatch for 4 days, relenting only when he threatens to resign.

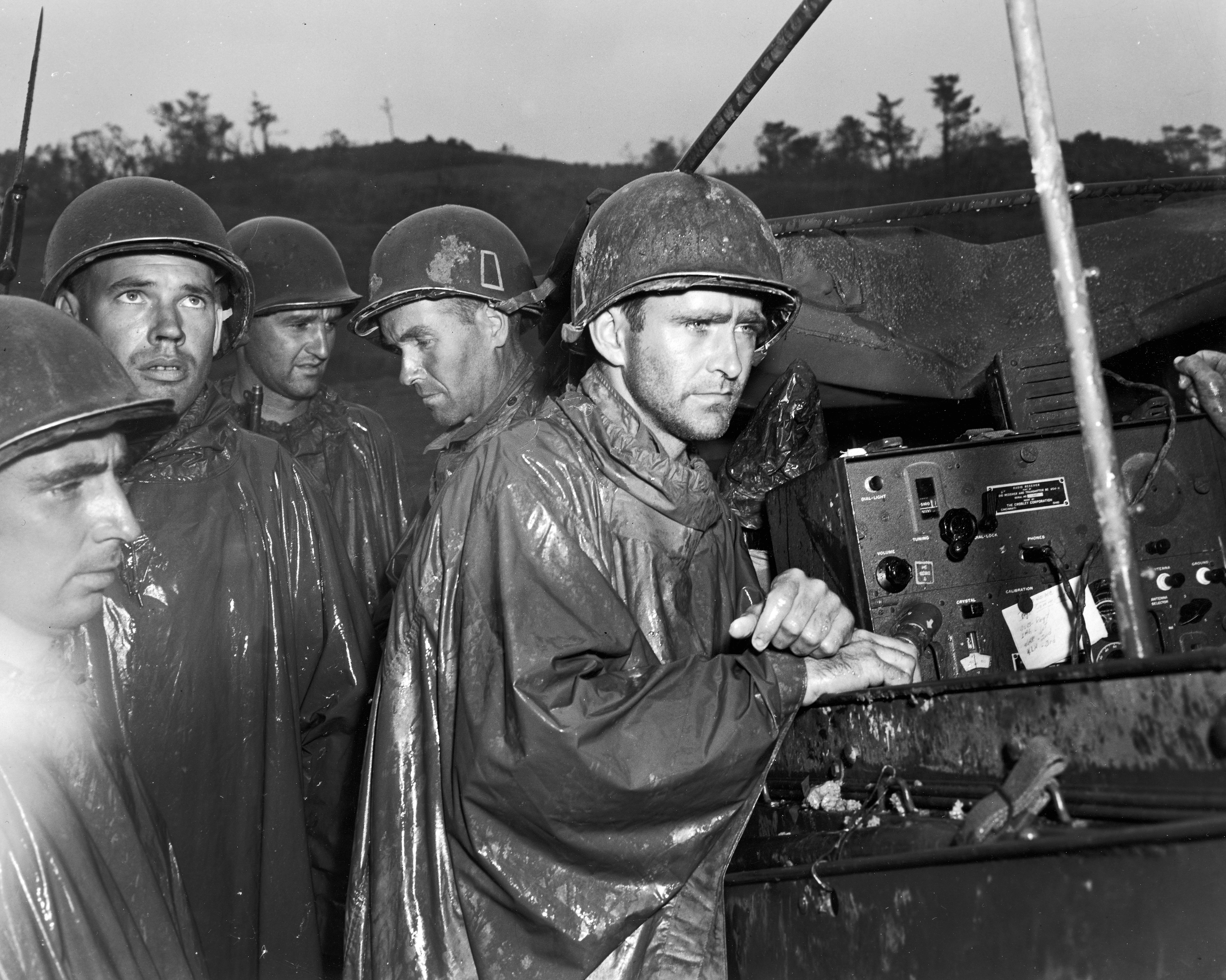
8 May – American soldiers fighting in the Pacific theater listen to radio reports of Victory in Europe Day

- 1 May – This evening, Reichssender Hamburg's Flensburg substation, the last shortwave radio station remaining on the air in Germany, interrupts a concert to announce the death of Adolf Hitler. The first place in the United Kingdom to hear of this is the BBC Monitoring Service at Caversham Park near Reading, Berkshire. President of Germany Karl Dönitz gives a broadcast this night declaring that it is his task to save the German people "from destruction by Bolshevists."
- 2 May – During the Battle of Berlin, the Red Army occupies the Haus des Rundfunks, headquarters of the Reichs-Rundfunk-Gesellschaft broadcasting organization.
- 4 May – Radio Hamburg begins broadcasting from the British occupied zone of Germany, with Wynford Vaughan-Thomas speaking from "Lord Haw-Haw"'s studio for the BBC. On 22 September, the station becomes Nordwestdeutscher Rundfunk (NWDR), the zone's official broadcasting organisation, set up by Hugh Greene, and in November the North German Radio Symphony Orchestra plays its first concert.
- 5 May – Supporters of the Czech Resistance on the staff of Czech Radio encourage the Prague uprising, leading to the Battle for Czech Radio.
- 6 May – Mildred Gillars ("Axis Sally") delivers her last propaganda broadcast to Allied troops (the first was on 11 December 1941).
- 7 May – The last German communication to be decoded at Bletchley Park is from a military radio station at Cuxhaven closing down. Lutz Graf Schwerin von Krosigk, Leading Minister in the rump Flensburg Government, makes a broadcast announcing the German surrender. This evening the BBC in the United Kingdom announces that the following day will be a holiday, Victory in Europe Day.
- 8 May – Victory in Europe Day in Western Europe. At 12:30 President of Germany Karl Dönitz broadcasts on his country's surrender to the nation. At 15:00 BST in the United Kingdom, the Prime Minister, Winston Churchill, makes a speech to the nation on the BBC from 10 Downing Street, and at 21:00 King George VI speaks to the British Empire from Buckingham Palace. Wynford Vaughan-Thomas reports from Lüneburg and Frank Gillard from Kassel. On 9 May (Moscow Time) the surrender is announced on Radio Moscow by Yuri Levitan.
- 28 May – U.S.-born Irish-raised William Joyce ("Lord Haw-Haw") is captured by British forces on the German border a month after recording his final (rambling and audibly drunk) propaganda broadcast. He is later charged with high treason in London for his earlier English-language wartime broadcasts on German radio, convicted, and then hanged in January 1946.
- 28 July – The BBC Allied Expeditionary Forces Programme ceases broadcasting because the radio stations of the Allies are now broadcasting within their zones of occupation in Europe.
- 29 July – The BBC Light Programme radio station is launched, concentrating on the broadcasting of mainstream light music and entertainment, superseding the BBC General Forces Programme within the United Kingdom using its longwave frequency from the Droitwich Transmitting Station.
- 7 August – Radio Tokyo first reports, unspecifically, on the previous day's bombing of Hiroshima.
- 15 August – Hirohito surrender broadcast: Emperor Hirohito's recorded announcement of the unconditional surrender of Japan is broadcast on Radio Tokyo a little after noon (Japan Standard Time). This is probably the first time an Emperor of Japan has been heard by the common people. Delivered in formal classical Japanese, without directly referring to surrender and following official censorship of the country's weak position, the speech is not immediately easily understood by ordinary people.
- 5 September – Iva Toguri D'Aquino, a Japanese American suspected of being wartime radio propagandist "Tokyo Rose", is arrested in Yokohama.
- 11 September – Radio Republik Indonesia starts broadcasting.
- 1 November – Telechron introduces the model 8H59 Musalarm in the United States, the first clock radio.
- Radio Filharmonisch Orkest founded in Hilversum (Netherlands) by Albert van Raalte.

== Debuts ==
- 6 January – The Saint debuts on NBC.
- 8 January – A Man Named Jordan debuts on CBS' West Coast network.
- 15 January – House Party (1945–1967) debuts on CBS.
- 15 January - The House of Mystery debuts on Mutual.
- 28 January – The Eddie Bracken Show debuts on NBC.
- 29 January – Lionel Barrymore becomes the host of Lux Radio Theater, replacing Cecil B. DeMille.
- 21 February – Brownstone Theater debuts on Mutual.
- 22 February - Hercule Poirot debuts on Mutual.
- 3 March – Superman encounters Batman and Robin for the first time. This occurs on the Mutual Network.
- 9 March – Those Websters debuts on CBS.
- 6 April – This Is Your FBI debuts on ABC.
- 7 April – Calling All Detectives debuts on Mutual.
- 9 April – Cimarron Tavern debuts on CBS.
- 15 April – Breakfast with Dorothy and Dick debuts on WOR.
- 16 April – Barry Cameron debuts on NBC.
- 21 May – Constance Bennett Calls on You debuts on ABC.
- 22 May – Auction Gallery debuts on Mutual.
- 7 June – The Adventures of Topper debuts on NBC.
- 10 June – Abbott Mysteries debuts on the Mutual Network.
- 10 June – The Adventures of Father Brown debuts on Mutual.
- 12 June - An Evening with Romberg debuts on NBC.
- 17 July – The Amazing Nero Wolfe debuts on the Don Lee Network.
- 10 August – The Adele Clark Show debuts on ABC.
- 21 August – The Jack Smith Show debuts on CBS.
- 27 August – Mommie and the Men debuts on CBS.
- 3 September – Joanie's Tea Room debuts on CBS.
- 5 September - Theatre Guild on the Air debuts on ABC.
- 12 September – The second version of Songs by Sinatra debuts on CBS.
- 5 October – Meet the Press debuts on Mutual.
- 20 October – Break the Bank debuts on Mutual.
- 25 October – The syndicated version of The Avenger debuts.
- 8 November – Island Venture debuts on CBS.
- 26 November – Bride and Groom debuts on ABC.

== Endings ==
- 3 January – Arthur Hopkins Presents ends its run on network radio (NBC).
- 4 January – Major Bowes Amateur Hour ends its run on network radio (NBC).
- 26 February - Happy Island ends its run on network radio (Blue Network).
- 16 March – The American Women's Jury ends its run on network radio (Mutual).
- 30 March – The Dreft Star Playhouse ends its two-year run on NBC.
- 7 April – Eddie Condon's Jazz Concerts ends its run on network radio (Blue Network).
- 20 April – Stage Door Canteen ends its run on network radio.
- 31 May – The Frank Morgan Show ends its run on network radio (NBC).
- 4 June – Author's Playhouse ends its run on network radio (NBC Red Network).
- 25 June - Everything for the Boys ends its run on network radio on NBC.
- 6 July
  - Bright Horizon ends its run on network radio (CBS).
  - Chick Carter, Boy Detective ends its run on network radio (Mutual).
- 29 July – The Adventures of Father Brown ends its single-summer run on Mutual.
- 25 August – Calling All Detectives ends its run on network radio (Mutual).
- 13 September – The Adventures of Topper ends its run on network radio (NBC).
- 23 September – Brownstone Theater ends its run on network radio (Mutual).
- 13 October – America in the Air ends its run on network radio (CBS).
- 11 November – The Army Hour ends its run on network radio (NBC).
- 30 November – The Amazing Nero Wolfe ends its run on network radio (Don Lee Network).

== Births ==
- 2 January – Baxter Black, American cowboy, poet, philosopher, large-animal veterinarian and radio commentator (died 2022).
- 9 January – Bill Heine, American-born British radio presenter and cinema owner (died 2019).
- 12 February – Luiz Carlos Alborghetti, Italian-Brazilian radio commenter, showman and political figure (died 2009).
- 8 March – Micky Dolenz, American actor, musician, television and theatre director and radio personality, best known as drummer/vocalist in the 1960s made-for-television band, The Monkees.
- 30 March – Johnnie Walker, born Peter Dingley, British DJ (died 2024).
- 2 May – Gene Deckerhoff, radio play-by-play announcer of the NFL's Tampa Bay Buccaneers.
- 25 May – Dave Lee Travis, born David Griffin, British DJ.
- 6 April – Neal Boortz, American talk radio host and commentator.
- 12 April – Glenn Hauser, American radio host.
- 17 June – Art Bell, American broadcaster, talk show host and author, known primarily as the founder and longtime host of the paranormal-themed radio program Coast to Coast AM (died 2018).
- 22 August – Pete Atkin, English singer-songwriter and radio producer.
- 23 August – Peter Donaldson, Egyptian-born British newsreader (died 2015).
- 19 September – Brendan Balfe, Irish radio presenter.
- 24 September – Lou Dobbs, CNN news anchor and managing editor for Lou Dobbs Tonight, host of Lou Dobbs Minute on radio.
- 28 October – Simon Brett, English radio producer and scriptwriter and detective fiction writer.
- 13 December
  - Herman Cain, African-American conservative newspaper columnist, businessman, political candidate, radio talk-show host and chairman and CEO of Godfather's Pizza (died 2020).
  - Kathy Garver, American actress, author and online radio hostess.
- Ernie Rea, Northern Irish religious broadcaster.

== Deaths ==
- 12 April – Franklin D. Roosevelt, 32nd POTUS who gave radio addresses known as Fireside chats.
- 18 September – C. H. Middleton, English gardening broadcaster (born 1886).
- c. October – Frederick Wilhelm Kaltenbach, American-born Nazi propagandist (born 1895).
