= 1941 in radio =

The year 1941 saw a number of significant happenings in radio broadcasting history.

== Events ==
- 1 January – Federal Communications Commission approval of commercial FM radio in the United States takes effect.
- 29 March – 80 percent of North America's AM broadcasting frequencies are reassigned to new channels pursuant to the North American Regional Broadcasting Agreement.
- April
  - The BBC begins to broadcast its first soap opera, Front Line Family, from the UK on its newly-created shortwave North American Service, intended as soft propaganda to the (at this time) neutral United States.
  - American journalist Douglas Chandler begins to broadcast Nazi propaganda from Berlin for the Reichs-Rundfunk-Gesellschaft, German state radio, in its U.S.A. service under the pseudonym "Paul Revere"/
- c. May – 6 actors in Norway who refuse to perform on state radio for the Quisling regime during the occupation of Norway by Nazi Germany have their work permits revoked.
- 23 May – Gustav Siegfried Eins, a British black propaganda station, begins broadcasting to German troops in Western Europe through shortwave transmitters in southern England, purporting to be an official German military station.
- 27 May – Fireside chat by the President of the United States: Announcing Unlimited National Emergency (longest fireside chat).
- 22 June – The invasion of the Soviet Union by Nazi Germany is reported on Radio Moscow by Yuri Levitan (who in the autumn is evacuated to Sverdlovsk).
- 26 June – The radio transmission that exposes the 'Red Orchestra' German anti-Nazi resistance group is intercepted by the Funkabwehr.
- 28 June – The first of four broadcasts from Berlin to the neutral United States by English-born humorist P. G. Wodehouse, who has been interned in Nazi Germany, is made. The series, entitled How to be an Internee Without Previous Training and comprising anecdotes about Wodehouse's experiences as a civilian internee, including some gentle mocking of his captors, is in August broadcast to the United Kingdom by the German propaganda ministry. The broadcasts generate a reaction, including, on 15 July, a strongly worded riposte on the BBC by print journalist William Connor. A 1944 official British investigation finds Wodehouse's actions to be no worse than "unwise" but he will never return to the UK.
- 3 July – Soviet premier Joseph Stalin makes his first radio broadcast to his people following the invasion of their country.
- 6 August – C. S. Lewis begins a series of BBC Radio broadcasts that will be adapted as Mere Christianity.
- 11 September – Fireside chat: On Maintaining Freedom of the Seas following the Greer Incident.
- 14 October – BBC programmes in the United Kingdom are first interrupted by Nazi German propaganda transmissions.
- 21 November – The live blues radio program King Biscuit Time is broadcast for the first time on KFFA in Helena, Arkansas; it will attain its 17,000th broadcast in 2014 making it the longest-running daily American radio broadcast.
- 7 December – At 2:26 p.m. EST (19:26 GMT), the Mutual Broadcasting System in the United States interrupts its play-by-play commentary on the New York Giants/Brooklyn Dodgers NFL game to announce the attack on Pearl Harbor. At around the same time, NBC Red breaks into Sammy Kaye's musical program, NBC Blue suspends National Vespers, and CBS Radio interrupts a concert by the New York Philharmonic for an announcement made by John Charles Daly. Other sources suggest the first coverage on CBS is in its scheduled news program, World News Today, at 2:30 p.m. EST when Daly reads the initial report and that the first report on NBC cuts into a play, a dramatization of The Inspector-General, at 2:33 p.m. EST, lasting just 21 seconds. News of the attack is first broadcast in Japan at 11:30 a.m. Japan Standard Time; however it has already been announced "shortly after" 7:00 a.m. JST that Japan had "entered into a situation of war with the United States and Britain in the Western Pacific before dawn", after the attacks had finished.
- 8 December – The President of the United States, Franklin D. Roosevelt, delivers the Presidential Address to Congress of 8 December 1941, commonly referred to as the "Infamy Speech" to a Joint Session of Congress at 12:30 p.m. EST (17:30 GMT). Transmitted live over all four major American radio networks, it attracts the largest audience ever measured for an American radio broadcast, with over 81 percent of homes tuning in.
- 9 December – Fireside chat: On the Declaration of War with Japan.

== Debuts ==
- 2 January – City Desk debuts on CBS.
- 6 January – Home of the Brave debuts on CBS.
- 7 January – Inner Sanctum Mysteries (1941–1952) debuts on the NBC Blue Network.
- 13 February – Joe and Mabel (1941–1942) debuts on NBC.
- 1 March – W47NV starts operations as the first commercial FM radio station.
- 1 March – Duffy's Tavern debuts on CBS.
- 5 March – Author's Playhouse debuts on NBC.
- 28 March – Hollywood Premiere, hosted by Louella Parsons, debuts on CBS.
- 31 March – The Story of Bess Johnson debuts on CBS and NBC.
- 5 April – WFCI signs on from Pawtucket, Rhode Island. There was an earlier WFCI owned by the same company which signed on in April 1927.
- 7 April – The Amazing Mr. Smith debuts on Mutual.
- 13 April – Bulldog Drummond debuts on Mutual.
- 27 April – Ed Sullivan Variety debuts on CBS.
- 30 April – WLAG, La Grange, Georgia, began broadcasting at 1240 kHz.
- 26 May – Buck Private and His Girl debuts on NBC.
- 31 May – Stars over Hollywood debuts on CBS.
- 23 June – Front Page Farrell debuts on Mutual.
- 26 June – WINC signs on in Winchester, Virginia, operating on 1400 AM.
- 1 July – Bringing Up Father debuts on NBC.
- 2 July – The Adventures of the Thin Man debuts on NBC.
- 4 July – Claudia and David debuts on CBS.
- 18 July – The Avenger debuts on WHN in New York City.
- 29 July – Harold Teen debuts on Mutual.
- 25 August – Bright Horizon debuts on CBS
- 31 August – The Great Gildersleeve debuts on the NBC Red Network.
- 22 September – Helpmate debuts on NBC.
- 28 September – Captain Flagg and Sergeant Quirt debuts on the Blue Network.wpota
- 4 October – The Armstrong Theater of Today debuts on CBS.
- 4 October – Hot Copy debuts on NBC.
- 22 October – The American Melody Hour debuts on the Blue Network.
- 2 November – Songs by Dinah Shore debuts on NBC-Blue.
- 30 December – The Brains Trust first broadcast under this title on BBC Home Service radio.
- 31 December – Anchors Aweigh debuts on Mutual.
- Undated
  - Sincerely Yours, presented by Vera Lynn, debuts on the BBC.
  - WFMF commences operations as an FM counterpart to WJBO at 98.1 Mc/s. Eventually WDGL would sign on in 1968 and take over the 98.1 frequency, forcing WFMF to change its frequency to 102.5.

== Closings ==
=== Programs ===
- 17 January – Charlie and Jessie ends its run on network radio (CBS).
- 10 April – The Ask-It Basket ends its run on network radio (CBS).
- 30 June – The Amazing Mr. Smith ends its run on network radio (Mutual).
- 22 August – Buck Private and His Girl ends its run on network radio (NBC).
- 19 September – Home of the Brave ends its run on network radio (NBC-Red).
- 26 September – By Kathleen Norris ends its run on network radio (CBS).
- 26 September – Claudia and David ends its run on network radio (CBS).
- 27 September – City Desk ends its run on network radio (CBS).
- 28 September – Ed Sullivan Variety ends its run on network radio (CBS).
- 30 September – Bringing Up Father ends its run on network radio (NBC).

=== Stations ===
- 28 March – KYAN, Cheyenne, Wyoming, ended broadcast operations, selling its transmitter site and tower to KFBC, Cheyenne.

== Births ==
- 31 March – Johnny Midnight, Filipino radio presenter (died 2014).
- 2 April – Dr. Demento, American radio disc jockey specializing in novelty songs and pop music parodies.
- 30 April – Chris Parkinson, New Zealand broadcaster, co-founder of Radio Hauraki (died 2016)
- 24 May – Bob Dylan, American singer-songwriter, author, musician, poet and, later, disc jockey, a major figure in popular music for five decades.
- 21 June – Totto Osvold, Norwegian radio entertainer (died 2023)
- July – Gary Burbank, longtime American radio personality on WLW in Cincinnati, Ohio.
- 20 July – Ed Doolan, Australian-born British radio presenter (died 2018).
- 28 July – Peter Marinker, actor.
- 4 August – Martin Jarvis, English voice and stage actor.
- 30 August – Sue MacGregor, British radio presenter.

== Deaths ==
- 4 January – Henri Bergson, French philosopher, writer and broadcaster, 81
- 10 July – Jelly Roll Morton, American jazz pianist, 50
- 19 September – Enrique Saborido, Uruguayan tango musician and composer, 64
- 21 December – Peetie Wheatstraw, African-American blues singer, 39
