= 1938 in radio =

The year 1938 saw a number of significant events in radio broadcasting.

== Events ==
- 3 January – The BBC Empire Service, begun in 1932, transmits its first programme in a foreign language: Arabic.
- 13 March – CBS carries the first point-to-point news roundup, including Edward R. Murrow's first live report, as part of its coverage of the Anschluss in Austria. Over the next few months, the daily programme will evolve into the CBS World News Roundup, a permanent fixture on the CBS network.
- 15 March – The BBC begins its Portuguese and Spanish service for Latin America.
- 14 April – Fireside chat by the President of the United States: On Economic Conditions.
- 6 May – The Caferadio copyright case is decided by the High Court of the Netherlands in favour of the composer Franz Lehár, who complains about a cafe owner allowing his customers to listen to a radio broadcast of Der Zarewitsch.
- 24 June – Fireside chat: On Party Primaries.
- 11 July – The first live drama adaptation in Orson Welles' The Mercury Theatre on the Air series on CBS Radio in the United States is broadcast: Bram Stoker's Dracula.
- 12 September – Commentator H. V. Kaltenborn begins his famous marathon of news bulletins on the CBS network in the United States covering the intensifying Czech Crisis over the Sudetenland. The first bulletin is a summation of Hitler's closing address to the Tenth (and, as it would prove, last) Party Congress of the Nazi party in Nuremberg. Kaltenborn will eat and sleep in the studio, making periodic updates, until the signing of the Munich Agreement on 29 September.
- 30 October – Orson Welles's radio adaptation of The War of the Worlds (with script by Howard Koch) is broadcast on CBS from New York as an episode of The Mercury Theatre on the Air. As this is a sustaining program and has no commercial interruptions, Welles centers the first two-thirds of the broadcast in the serious style of a series of news bulletins interrupting a live musical broadcast. This approach results in panic in various parts of the United States, although later research suggests its level has been exaggerated.
- 10 November – Kate Smith sings God Bless America for the first time on her radio show, a day before Armistice Day.
- 12 November – France's Finance Minister Paul Reynaud uses a radio broadcast to try to sell his programme of reforms, stating that the country is "going blindfold into an abyss".
- date unknown – Antonio Tovar becomes director of Radio Nacional de España, broadcasting from Salamanca.

== Debuts ==
- 2 January – Musical-variety program The Mickey Mouse Theater of the Air debuts on NBC.
- 3 January – The soap opera Woman in White (1938–1948) debuts on NBC Red.
  - Terry Regan, Attorney at Law debuts on NBC Blue.
  - Quiz program True or False debuts on Mutual.
- 17 January – Stepmother (1938–1942) debuts on CBS.
- 18 January – Alias Jimmy Valentine debuts on the Blue Network.
- 3 February – Challenge of the Yukon (later renamed Sergeant Preston of the Yukon) debuts on WXYZ.
- 12 February – Howie Wing debuted on the Don Lee Network in the western United States.
- 26 February – Great Plays debuts on the Blue Network.
- March – Radio Normandy Calling, variety programme hosted by Roy Plomley and sponsored by Macleans toothpaste.
- 28 April – Adult Education Series (1938–1957) debuts on CBS.
- 2 May – Adventures in Reading debuts on the Blue Network.
- 30 May – Joyce Jordan, Girl Interne debuts on CBS.
- 5 July – Texaco Star Theater debuts on CBS and NBC.
- 11 July – The Mercury Theatre on the Air debuts on CBS.
- 22 July – Curtain Time debuts on the Mutual Broadcasting System.
- 4 September – The Fitch Bandwagon debuts on NBC.
- 8 September – Art Baker's Notebook debuts on KFI. It will be syndicated to other stations via electrical transcription.
- 20 September – Battle of the Sexes debuts on NBC (not to be confused with the Australian show of the same name).
- 1 October – Avalon Time debuts on NBC.
- 3 October – Her Honor, Nancy James debuts on CBS.
- 5 October – The Ask-It Basket debuts on CBS.
- 13 November – Americans All, Immigrants All debuts on CBS.
- 21 November – Central City debuts on NBC Blue.

== Endings ==
- 25 February – Beatrice Fairfax ends its run on network radio (Mutual).
- 2 May – Brave New World ends its run on network radio (CBS).
- 3 June - The Song Shop ends its run on network radio (CBS).
- 13 June – The Witch's Tale ends its run on network radio (Mutual).
- 26 June – The Baker's Broadcast ends its run on the NBC Blue network.
- 2 December – Hollywood Hotel ends its run on network radio (CBS).

== Births ==
- 1 January
  - Clay Cole (died 2010), American radio disc jockey and television host, best known for his dance program, The Clay Cole Show.
  - Norma Jean Nilsson, American actress who plays Kathy Anderson in the radio version of Father Knows Best.
- 21 January – Wolfman Jack (died 1995), American disc jockey, television personality and actor.
- 6 May – Larry Gogan (died 2020), Irish disc jockey.
- 16 July – Þorkell Sigurbjörnsson, Icelandic pianist, conductor, composer and radio host (died 2013)
- 3 August – Terry Wogan (died 2016), Irish-British broadcaster.
- 17 August – Duncan Johnson (died 2018), Canadian-born disc jockey.
- 8 September – Adrian Cronauer, American lawyer and radio disc jockey who inspires the film Good Morning, Vietnam.
- 10 September – "Diddy" David Hamilton, born David Pilditch, English broadcast personality.
- 1 November – Malcolm Laycock (died 2009), English radio presenter and producer.
- 13 December – Chris Emmett, English radio comedy actor.
- 16 December – Frank Deford (died 2017), American senior contributing writer for Sports Illustrated, author and sports commentator for NPR's Morning Edition.
- DATE UNKNOWN – Ron Della Chiesa, Boston-area radio personality.

== Deaths ==
- 6 August – Warner Oland, 58, Swedish-born actor ("Charlie Chan")
