= Bret Morrison =

American actor (1912–78)

- Bret Morrison and Grace Matthews as Lamont Cranston and Margot Lane
- Born: 5 May 1912; Chicago, Illinois
- Died: 25 September 1978 (aged 66); Hollywood, California
- Occupation: Actor

Bret Morrison (5 May 1912 – 25 September 1978) was an American actor best known as the voice of the mysterious crusader for law and order on radio's The Shadow. He was also a popular cabaret singer.

== Career ==
Born in Chicago, Illinois, Morrison entered radio during the 1930s while he was still in Chicago High School. He began with The First Nighter Program. In 1937, he was in the cast of Lucky Girl, a Monday-Friday drama broadcast on WGN in Chicago.

Morrison portrayed the Shadow longer than any other actor, spending 10 years in the role in two separate runs. Orson Welles originated the role as a featured character from 1937 to '38, followed by Bill Johnstone who played the Shadow until early 1943. Morrison replaced Johnstone in April, 1943, continuing until 1944. John Archer (1944–45) was followed by Steve Courtleigh (1945). Morrison then returned from 1945 until 1954. For many, he was the definitive voice of the Shadow, though his delivery was much less sinister than other actors, particularly Welles. Shadow historian Anthony Tollin argues that while the other actors who portrayed the Shadow were capable performers, Morrison was most devoted to treating the role seriously and put the most effort into researching background details for authenticity.

Morrison's other roles in radio programs included those shown in the table below.

Program	Role
Best Seller	Host-narrator
Chicago Theater of the Air	Cast member
Great Gunns	Chris Gunn
Guiding Light	Clifford Foster
Listening Post	Host-narrator
Melody Theater	Master of ceremonies
Musical Bouquet	Host
The Romance of Helen Trent	Jonathan Howard

== Death ==
In 1974 Morrison was living in Palm Springs, California. At age 66, Morrison died of a heart attack. He was found slumped over the steering wheel of his parked car on a Hollywood street where he had stopped for shopping after taping an episode of Heartbeat Theater. It was believed 107-degree temperatures in a Southern California heat wave may have prompted Morrison's heart attack.
