= Calling All Detectives =

American radio mystery series (1945–1950)

Calling All Detectives is an American radio mystery program. A 30-minute version was broadcast on the Mutual Broadcasting System April 7, 1945 - August 25, 1945. A 15-minute version was syndicated from 1947 to 1950. The first program of its kind, the Mutual version featured "nation-wide audience participation".

== Mutual version ==
Each episode of the program began with a mystery that listeners were challenged to solve. Immediately after the climax of the mystery segment, control of the broadcast switched from the network to local stations for five minutes. At each station, an announcer selected a postcard from those sent in by listeners and called the person whose card was selected. If the person solved the mystery correctly, he or she received a war bond. When the local segment ended, control went back to the network for the conclusion of the story. Personnel at each station called the selected person during the initial network segment to ensure that he or she was at home. Values of prizes varied from station to station; at each station if the person called gave an incorrect answer, the prize value was increased for the next week.

Opening with "a whodunit narrative", each episode included clues provided by a narrator named Robin. The clues were designed to help listeners determine who committed the crime. Vincent Pelletier portrayed Robin, and Paul Barnes played detective Browning. Owen Jordan and Frank Lovejoy were heard in supporting roles. The announcer was George Bower, and Dick Platt played the organ. Kenneth Houston was the writer, and Alan M. Fishburn was the director. Sealy Bedding Company was the sponsor. The show was broadcast on Saturdays at 9:30 p.m. Eastern Time.

=== Episodes ===
The table below lists some episodes of the program.

Partial List of Episodes of Calling All Detectives
Date	Episode
April 28, 1945	"The Case of the Sponsored Suicide"
May 19, 1945	"The Case of the Ten O'Clock Scholar"
June 9, 1945	"The Case of the Glass Dagger"
June 16, 1945	"The Case of the Complacent Canary"
July 14, 1945	"The Case of the Marrying Maidens"
July 21, 1945	"The Case of the Amiable Assassin"
August 11, 1945	"The Case of the Vanishing Truck"

=== Critical response ===
A review in the trade publication Variety called the mystery-quiz combination "a sweet gimmick". The review complimented Houston's script, Fishburn's directing, Pelletier's narration, and Platt's organ skills.

== Syndicated version ==
The syndicated version of the show was 15 minutes long and was transcribed. After each story ended, listeners were telephoned and asked a question. People who answered correctly qualified for a "jackpot question". Barnes had all of the roles, accompanied only by a sound-effects person. Jerry Joss Features produced the program, and Larry Kurtz was the director. Freelance writers provided the scripts.

=== Critical response ===
A review in Variety said that a quarter-hour was too short a time for a combination of "a capsule whodunit and a telephone quiz game". With only about 10 minutes allotted to the story component, the review said that Barnes seemed to be on a treadmill trying to fit the script into the available time. It summarized by saying that if the show were to gain a larger audience it needed "crisper story material".
