= Marjorie Anderson =

British actress and BBC radio broadcaster

- Born: 7 November 1913; Kensington, London, England
- Died: 14 December 1999 (aged 86); Kensington, London, England
- Occupation: Radio presenter
- Known for: Host of Forces Favourites programme on BBC Radio during World War II; presenter on Woman's Hour from 1958 to 1972

Marjorie Anderson MBE (7 November 1913 – 14 December 1999) was a British actress and leading BBC radio broadcaster for over thirty years, including on the programme Woman's Hour from 1958 to 1972.

== Early life ==
Marjorie Enid Anderson was born in Kensington, London. Her father Harold Anderson was a naval intelligence officer, who died in Belgium just after World War I, when Marjorie was a little girl; she was raised by her mother, Charlotte Augusta Boyle Anderson, a property dealer.

Anderson attended school at Felixstowe College in Suffolk, and trained as a reader at the Central School of Speech Training in London. She earned a diploma from the University of London in diction and drama.

== Career ==
Anderson began her career as an actress, appearing in T. S. Eliot's Murder in the Cathedral on the West End and in a 1938 touring company in the United States. She also taught voice classes, and worked with children who had speech defects.

From 1940 to 1945, during World War II, Anderson presented Thank You for your Letters and Forces Favourites on the BBC Forces Programme and BBC General Forces Programmes. She also presented the latter programme's peacetime successor, Family Favourites, on the BBC Light Programme. Her "disciplined, upbeat manner" was considered helpful to wartime and postwar morale. On American radio, Anderson played Margot Lane, female lead in popular crime drama The Shadow, from 1939 to 1940 and again from 1943 to 1944.

Between 1955 and 1968 Anderson presented Home for the Day on the BBC Home Service. She was a presenter of Woman's Hour from 1958 until her retirement in 1973. Anderson had multiple sclerosis which, as it progressed, affected her speech and thus her radio career, prompting her retirement.

Anderson's contribution to UK radio is commemorated in the Radio Academy's Hall of Fame. She was appointed MBE in the 1974 Birthday Honours.

== Personal life ==
Marjorie Anderson married advertising executive Anthony Sykes in 1947. They had a son, Jeremy, born in 1948. She was widowed when Sykes died in 1961. She died in 1999, aged 86 years, in Kensington.
