= Home of the Brave (radio program) =

American old-time radio serial drama

- Genre: Serial drama
- Running time: 15 minutes
- Country of origin: United States
- Language: English
- Syndicates: CBS; NBC-Red
- Starring: Tom Tully; Ed Latimer; Jeanette Nolan; Sammie Hill
- Original release: January 6 – September 19, 1941
- Sponsored by: Calumet Baking Powder; Swansdown Cake Flour

Home of the Brave is an American old-time radio serial drama. It was broadcast on CBS beginning on January 6, 1941. On April 28, 1941, it switched to NBC-Red, where it remained until the series ended on September 19, 1941.

== Format ==
Set in New Chance, Colorado, Home of the Brave focused on Joe, a telephone lineman, and the girl whom he loved.

The 15-minute program was sponsored by Calumet Baking Powder and Swansdown Cake Flour.

== Personnel ==
The show's characters and the actors who portrayed them are shown in the table below.

Character	Actor(s)
Joe	Tom Tully; Ed Latimer
Casino	Jeanette Nolan; Sammie Hill
Neil Davisson	Richard Widmark; Vincent Donehue
Lois Davisson	Jone Allison
Spencer Howard	Alan Bunce
Patrick Mulvaney	Ted de Corsia
Doc Gordon	Ed Latimer

Source: Radio Programs, 1924-1984: A Catalog of More Than 1800 Shows
