= The Affairs of Ann Scotland =

American old-time radio detective drama

- Genre: Detective drama
- Running time: 30 minutes
- Country of origin: United States
- Language(s): English
- Syndicates: ABC
- Starring: Arlene Francis
- Announcer: Ken Niles
- Directed by: Helen Mack
- Original release: October 30, 1946 – October 22, 1947
- Sponsored by: Rayve shampoo

The Affairs of Ann Scotland is an American old-time radio detective drama. It was broadcast on ABC from October 30, 1946, until October 22, 1947, and was 30 minutes long. The title character was radio's first female detective.

== Format ==
Radio historian John Dunning described Scotland as "a satin-tongued cutie, quick on the uptake". In one episode, she became excited to find that the man who wanted her to investigate threats on his life was handsome, but the excitement turned to disappointment when he was killed. Before the half-hour had ended, she used "a combination of charm and quick thinking" to solve the case.

== Personnel and sponsor ==
Arlene Francis had the title role. Ken Niles was the announcer, and Del Castillo provided music. Helen Mack was the director.

Rayve cream shampoo began sponsoring The Affairs of Ann Scotland on October 30, 1946. That sponsorship ended on January 22, 1947, and the program became sustaining.
