= Broadway Talks Back =

American radio talk series (1946–1947)

Broadway Talks Back is an American radio talk program that began on the Mutual Broadcasting System on October 14, 1946, and ended in 1947.

== Overview ==
Each episode of Broadway Talks Back had two people from "the week's most important new play" confronting two drama critics from printed publications in an effort to respond to critics' comments. Barrett H. Clark, executive director of the Dramatists Play Service, was the moderator. Critics who appeared on the program included George Freedley, Joseph T. Shipley, Robert Garland, John David Beaufort, John Chapman, John Gassner, Joseph Wood Krutch, Louis Kronenberger, Burns Mantle, Arthur Pollack, and Vernon Rice. People who represented plays included Ruth Chatterton, Luther Adler, Moss Hart, Cecil Beaton and Cornelia Otis Skinner.

The trade publication Variety called the show an opportunity for "long-suffering Broadway legit producers, not to mention playwrights ... [to] slug it out weekly" with critics from newspapers and magazines. Variety commented that previously rebuttals to critics had been available only via letters to the editor. In an article published before the program debuted, Variety said that interest was particularly timely in light of a "critics vs. producers-playwrights flareup [that] hit a crescendo last season."

== Episodes ==
Partial List of Episodes of Broadway Talks Back
Date	Play	Critics	Play representatives
October 14, 1946	The Iceman Cometh	Chapman. Howard Barnes	Theresa Helburn, Eddie Dowling
October 28, 1946	The Duchess of Malfi	Shipley, John Gardner	John Carradine, Jean Dalyrimple.
December 16, 1946	Park Avenue	Robert Coleman, William Hawkins	Arthur Schwartz, Mary Wickes

== Production ==
Gertrude Berg and Vera Eikel (at that time "radio's only program-building team made up of women") packaged the program, which originated from WOR's radio facilities in the former Guild Theatre in New York City. Roger Bower was the director. Episodes were recorded in afternoons so that the critics could attend plays at the time the show was on the air. They were broadcast on Mondays from 10 to 10:30 p.m. Eastern Time locally on WOR and 10:30 to 11 p.m. E. T. on other stations via Mutual.

== Critical response ==
Jack Gould wrote in The New York Times that the program "would be twice the show it is now" if the format were reversed, allowing representatives of plays to speak first. He said that allowing critics to speak first, essentially repeating their printed criticism, put the play people on the defensive. Gould added that Clark "does an excellent and unobtrusive job" as moderator.

John Crosby wrote, "The program is fun to listen to when the controversy gets red hot and not much fun when it doesn't." He added that the show suffered from having an insufficient number of critics to draw from and added, "some of them aren't very expressive when deprived of their typewriters."

A review of the premiere episode in Variety said that the show "muffed a wonderful opportunity", turning what "could have been a controversial, provocative session" into "another drama-discussion — amicable, friendly ...". The review described Clark as "well-posted on both plays and the reviews, quick to bring up salient points and clever in handling his board and the discussion".

An article in a subsequent issue of Variety said that the show failed to attract as much attention as had been expected. It blamed both components of the program, saying "except on rare occasions, producers ... pull their punches and don't really 'talk back' to the critics" while the critics who had been toughest in print "become sweet as sugar when they go on the air ... patting on the back the same guys they'd previously rapped in print."
