= Howie Wing =

American old-time radio juvenile aviation adventure serial

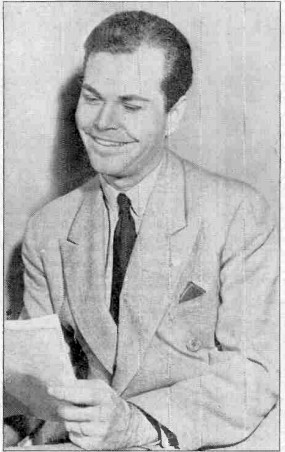
- William Janney played the title role in Howie Wing
- Genre: Juvenile aviation adventure
- Running time: 15 minutes
- Country of origin: United States
- Language: English
- Syndicates: CBS; Don Lee Network
- Starring: William Janney; Neil O'Malley
- Created by: Bill Moore
- Written by: Bill Moore
- Original release: January 31, 1938 – June 30, 1939
- Sponsored by: Kellogg's

Howie Wing is an American old-time radio juvenile aviation adventure serial. It was syndicated by the World Broadcasting System and distributed initially to stations in Canada, beginning on January 31, 1938. The Don Lee Network began carrying it in the western United States on February 12, 1938. The program was broadcast weekdays on CBS from October 3, 1938, until June 30, 1939.

== Background ==
Bill Moore, who created and wrote Howie Wing, was one of the creators of another old-time radio aviation program, The Air Adventures of Jimmie Allen. Moore was a pilot with the Royal Flying Corps in World War I and a barnstorming pilot thereafter, both of which provided a background for his writing about aviation. An article in Radio Guide magazine described the program as "an authentic saga of aviation." Moore enhanced the show's authenticity by taking the cast and sound-effects people flying to help them appreciate the atmosphere needed for the program.

== Story line ==
Howie Wing began as a flier with the Cadet Aviation Corps. Later, Captain Harvey, who owned an airline in South America, made Wing his co-pilot. The program's plots focused on Wing's battles against corruption, especially that involving Burton York, a saboteur who operated under the cover of being an insurance agent.

In light of research that showed 70 percent of the program's audience was children, the scripts avoided situations that might have been confusing for children.

Howie Wing was sponsored by Kellogg's.

== Characters and cast ==
In addition to Wing, the program featured Captain Harvey, a veteran flier of World War I. Donna Cavendish was a stewardess who became Wing's love interest. Zero Smith was a disagreeable fellow pilot, Typhoon Tootel was the mechanic, and Burton York was the villain.

Characters in Howie Wing and the actors who portrayed them are shown in the table below.

Character	Actor
Howie Wing	William Janney
Captain Harvey	Neil O'Malley
The Chief	Richard Bishop
Burton York	Raymond Bramley
Zero Smith	John Griggs
Donna Cavendish	Mary Parker
Typhoon Tootel	Robert Strauss

The transcribed version had a different cast, which included Billie Rose, Audrey McGrath, Bill Bouchey, and Hugh Studebaker. Moore wrote and produced that program.

== Legacy ==
In 1939, American Airlines named a flagship Howie Wing, the first time in air transportation history that a plane had been named for a radio program. The trade publication Broadcasting described the designation as "a tribute of the airline to the work of Kellogg Co. in making American youngsters air-minded."
