= An Evening with Romberg =

American radio musical series (1945–1948)

An Evening with Romberg is an American musical radio program that was broadcast on NBC from June 12, 1945, until August 31, 1948, as a summer replacement for other programs. Sigmund Romberg was the star, and Raleigh cigarettes was the sponsor.

== 1945 ==
Replacing Hildegarde's Raleigh Room program, beginning on June 12, 1945, An Evening with Romberg was broadcast at 10:30 p.m. Eastern Time, with episodes consisting of six minutes of Romberg's compositions and 20 minutes of music from other composers. Robert Merrill was the regular featured soloist, and each episode included a guest soloist. Don Gillis was the director, Frank Gallop was the narrator, and Ed Hurlihy was the announcer. Jack Simpson and Flora Bash were the writers.

Diana Gibbings, writing in The New York Times, described the music as "reminiscent of cool evenings on a moon-drenched lake, where the mercury remains steadfastly at 70". The program was popular enough for NBC to bring it back as a regular program on Wednesdays at 8:30 p.m. E. T. beginning on October 17, 1945. Soprano Irene Hill (in reality Genevieve Rowe using a pseudonym) (Note: An item in the October 1946 issue of Radio Mirror magazine said, "Last year, when she was appearing regularly on two network shows, Genevieve was asked to use a pseudonym on one of them. She was both Irene Hill and Genevieve Row.") and baritone Frank Farris were featured each week and Romberg conducted the orchestra. Gallop, Gillis, and Bash continued in their roles from the summer, while Jack Costello was the new announcer.

=== Critical response ===
Magee Adams wrote in The Cincinnati Enquirer that Romberg's summer show "was so delightful that it earned a permanent winter spot". Adams added, "Wednesday evening schedules sorely need just the sort of music Sigmund Romberg can supply so abundantly."

A review in the trade publication Variety said that the summer program "packs plenty of listenable music". It said that Gallop was a plus, "handling his chatter sequences brightly and with his customary aplomb", and it noted that the 45-person orchestra was the "chief attraction".

Variety also reviewed the premiere fall episode, calling it an example of a typical Romberg program — a "slightly schmaltzy, somewhat nostalgic, but always pleasantly tuneful session of gay or sentimental music served up with snap and dash". The review also complimented Hill's and Farris's solos and their duet.

== 1946 ==
An Evening with Romberg replaced Red Skelton's program beginning on June 11, 1946. Rowe was the female vocalist, and baritone Reinhold Schmidt was her male counterpart. A 52-piece orchestra provided music. Ford Pearson was the narrator, with Rod O'Connor and Ned LeFevre as the announcers. Bob Owen was the producer. Episodes featured many compositions by Romberg.

=== Critical response ===
A review of the premiere episode in Variety said that Romberg and his music "make a good summer replacement for Red Skelton, as it did last year for Hildegarde." It complimented Rowe's "fine soprano" and Schmidt's "imposing baritone" and said that their duets were the highlight of the episode.

== 1947 ==
Beginning on June 10, 1947, the program again replaced Skelton's show on Tuesdays at 10:30 p.m. E. T. Schmidt once again was the male vocalist, and soprano Anne Jamison was the featured female singer. O'Connor was the announcer, and Keith McLeod was the director.

=== Critical response ===
A review in Variety described the show as "30 minutes of uninterrupted light musical fare with emphasis on ersatz symphonic arrangements out of the semi-classical library". Comparing the program to a summer park concert, the review said that Romberg's style made all of the songs "sound pretty much alike". Commercials drew the review's harshest comments: "... probably the most grating-on-the-nerve plugs of any in radio, with the multiple reprise of the moisture sound effects sufficient to spoil anyone's enjoyment of a program".

== 1948 ==
An Evening with Romberg substituted for Skelton's show on Tuesdays at 10:30 p.m. Eastern Time, beginning on June 8, 1948. Baritone John Howard and soprano Jean Fenn were the featured singers. McLeod was the director, O'Connor was the announcer, and Pearson was the narrator. The last summer 1948 broadcast occurred on August 31, as People Are Funny took over that time slot for the new radio season.

=== Critical response ===
A review in the trade publication Billboard called the program "pleasant fare" and added, "for those who like their music straight, it's nice material". The review complimented the voices of Fenn and Howard and noted that in its fourth summer the show had "simmered down to a routine, easy-to-take pattern". The one negative element of the review pointed out the "very strong, and sometimes irritating, pattern" of the Raleigh commercials.

A review in Variety called the show "an attractive program and an excellent salespoint for Raleighs", but it described the commercials as having a "general nondescript quality" and being "overlong as well as overdone."
