= Grace Matthews =

Radio actress

- Matthews on the cover of the February 1953 edition of the Radio-TV Magazine
- Born: September 3, 1910; Toronto, Ontario, Canada
- Died: May 15, 1995 (aged 84); Mount Kisco, New York, US
- Education: University of Toronto
- Occupation: Actress
- Spouse: Court Benson (1940-?)
- Children: 1 daughter 1 son

Grace Matthews (September 3, 1910 – May 15, 1995) was a Canadian actress in the era of old-time radio and the early years of television. She is perhaps best known for portraying Margo Lane in the radio program The Shadow.

== Early years ==
Matthews was born in Toronto, Canada, on September 3, 1910. She graduated from the University of Toronto and from the Royal Academy of Dramatic Art in London, England.

== Radio ==
Matthews played Margo Lane in The Shadow 1946-1949. Lane was described in the program's scripts as the faithful companion of Lamont Cranston, alter ego of The Shadow. A February 5, 1987, article in the Milwaukee Journal reported Matthews' confusion about the programs: "The plots were so complicated I often had difficulty figuring them out. After the show, I'd go home and ask my husband ... to explain what had happened."

Program	Role
Big Sister	Ruth Wayne
The Brighter Day	Liz
Hilltop House	Julie Erickson
Road of Life	Carson McVicker

Matthews was the lead actress on American Portrait, Soldier's Wife and The Story of Dr. Susan, and she appeared often on Armstrong's Theatre of Today. She was active in Canadian radio for about five years before she began working on radio in the United States. In later years, she was heard in some episodes of CBS Radio Mystery Theater.

== Stage ==
Matthews' theatrical work included stock theater in Manitoba, Canada, and Ontario, Canada, summer stock activities in Marblehead, Massachusetts, and the production of Dame Nature by the Theatre Guild in New York City.

In Canada, Matthews was active in the Hart House Theatre and the John Holden Players.

Radio-TV Mirror, February 1953, featuring Grace Matthews, her husband Court Benson, and children Paul and Andrea. Elaine Kent, Groucho Marx and Elaine Rost are also featured.

== Television ==
Matthews was seen in Road of Life, As the World Turns as Grace Baker #2, and The Guiding Light as Claudia Dillman. She also spent three years in London, England, acting in programs on ITV and the BBC.

== Recognition ==
Matthews' work as an actress on radio in Canada in 1944 earned her three national awards — The Major Genera La Fleche Trophy, Canadian Broadcaster magazine's Beaver Award and a top rating in a poll by Canadian newspapers. She also won the Beaver Award (for "Distinguished Service to Canadian Radio") in 1940.

== Personal life ==
Matthews married announcer and actor Court Benson in October 1940. They had a daughter, Andrea, and a son, Paul.

== Death ==
Matthews died May 15, 1995, in Mount Kisco, New York.
