= The Adele Clark Show =

1945–1946 radio show

- Other names: Songs by Adele Clark
- Genre: Musical variety
- Running time: 30 minutes
- Country of origin: United States
- Language: English
- Syndicates: ABC
- Starring: Adele Clark
- Announcer: Gene Kirby
- Original release: August 10, 1945 – September 21, 1946

The Adele Clark Show was a musical variety radio series which aired on ABC from 1945 to 1946. It was sometimes known as Songs by Adele Clark.

Ex-WAC Adele Clark was the host and vocalist on the 30-minute show which featured Jack Kelly and His Orchestra. The program's announcer was Gene Kirby (1909–1985), a well-known sportscaster (Big Moments in Sports) who also announced for such shows as The Clock and The Fat Man.

Adele Clark recorded for Decca. Her 1947 tunes for Decca were "You've Changed" and "But None Like You."

The radio program began August 10, 1945 and continued until September 21, 1946.

In 1948, Adele Clark was heard on ABC's Sound-Off.

Interest in this radio series continues to the present day, as indicated by its inclusion in Handbook of Old Time Radio: A Comprehensive Guide to Golden Age Radio Listening and Collecting (Scarecrow Press, 1993).
