= The Avenger (radio program) =

American old-time radio crime drama

- Genre: Crime drama
- Running time: 30 minutes
- Country of origin: United States
- Language: English
- Home station: WHN
- Starring: James Monks (1945–1946); Dick Janaver (1945–1946)
- Announcer: George Ansbro (1945–1946)
- Written by: Paul Ernst (1941–1942); Henry Ralston (1941–1942); Gil Braun (1945–1946); Ruth Braun (1945–1946); Walter B. Gibson (1945–1946)
- Directed by: Maurice Joachim (1941–1942)
- Produced by: Charles Michelson (1945–1946)
- Original release: July 18, 1941 – April 18, 1946

The Avenger is the name of two old-time radio crime dramas in the United States. The first one was broadcast weekly on WHN in New York City, New York, July 18, 1941 – November 3, 1942. The second was syndicated nationally October 25, 1945 – April 18, 1946. It was the first program distributed by WHN Transcription Service, which previously had distributed only commercials.

== Format ==
=== 1941–1942 version ===
Richard Henry Benson was "a crime-fighter of super-strength known as the Avenger" who was accompanied by his sidekick, Fergus "Mac" MacMurdie. Benson was described as "one part Shadow and three parts Doc Savage, drawing elements from each in an attempt to recreate the commercial success of those two characters."

In August 1941, newsstands in WHN's listening area displayed "large red cardboard posters" that emphasized the connection between the radio program and Street and Smith's magazine, The Avenger.

=== 1945–1946 version ===
Radio historian John Dunning described this season of The Avenger as "a poor man's version of The Shadow." Jim Brandon (alter ego of The Avenger) was a biochemist who invented a Telepathic Indicator and a Secret Diffusion Capsule, both of which helped him fight crime.

Jim Cox, in his book Radio Crime Fighters: More Than 300 Programs from the Golden Age, noted characteristics that The Avenger shared with The Shadow: having "a drop-dead gorgeous subordinate, Fern Collier, who alone knew his true identity"; being hidden by "a black light of invisibility"; and having the ability to interpret "'thought flashes' of other people." Cox added that the similarities could be explained by the facts that Walter B. Gibson was the creator of both characters and that both characters had appeared in magazines from Street & Smith Publications before their radio programs began.

== Personnel ==
=== 1941–1942 version ===
Dunning's reference book, On the Air: The Encyclopedia of Old-Time Radio, says that the main character, Richard Henry Benson, was played by an "unknown New York actor," while Humphrey Davis portrayed Fergus "Mac" MacMurdie. An item in the September 16, 1942, issue of the trade publication Variety reported that Bill Zuckert had joined the program's cast, but it did not specify the character that he played. Maurice Joachim was the director. Paul Ernst (writing as Kenneth Robeson) and Henry Ralston were writers.

=== 1945–1946 version ===
James Monks initially played the lead role, with Dick Janaver replacing him later. Helen Adamson played assistant Fern Collier. George Ansbro was the announcer, and Doc Whipple provided the music. Charles Michelson was the producer. Writers were Gil Braun, Ruth Braun and Walter Gibson.

== Syndication ==
Charles Michelson Inc. of New York City distributed The Avenger in syndication via transcription. An item in the October 22, 1945, issue of the trade publication Broadcasting reported that 52 episodes were available to stations.

== See also ==
- Avenger (pulp-magazine character)
- The Shadow
