= List of stars on the Hollywood Walk of Fame =

The detailed, alphabetized Content tables below the Multiple Stars table includes the names, locations, and categories of all the stars on the Hollywood Walk of Fame. The categories are motion pictures, television, recording, radio, live performance, and sports entertainment. The list does not include a star's name until his or her award ceremony has been scheduled, not at the time of nomination or an accepted nomination.

The stars are ordered alphabetically by surname, and all names are shown as they appear on the stars. A performer can have more than one star, recognising their separate achievements in more than one category. While the first seven honorees received their temporary stars in 1958, the list had grown by February 8, 1960, when the first 1,563 permanent stars were placed in the sidewalks along Hollywood Boulevard, already including 199 performers with repeat recognitions, such as the first three (of four) stars for Bob Hope and the first four (of five) stars for Gene Autry. All entries can be found on the Hollywood Walk of Fame website maintained by the Hollywood Chamber of Commerce. As of November 5, 2026, with a ceremony honoring Robin Roberts and George Stephanopoulos, there are 2,863 stars embedded along the boulevard.

Multiple Stars (based on counts in the alphabetized tables referenced in the Content section below as of August 28, 2026)

5 Stars (1 individual)	4 Stars (4 individuals)	3 Stars (31 individuals)	Motion Picture Star + Television Star (93 individuals)
1. Gene Autry	1. Bob Hope; 2. Tony Martin; 3. Roy Rogers (includes Sons of the Pioneers star); 4. Mickey Rooney (includes one star shared with Jan Chamberlin)	1. Bud Abbott; 2. Ben Alexander; 3. Jack Benny; 4. Edgar Bergen; 5. George Burns; 6. Eddie Cantor; 7. Perry Como; 8. Lou Costello; 9. Bing Crosby; 10. Nelson Eddy; 11. Douglas Fairbanks Jr.; 12. Tennessee Ernie Ford; 13. Jane Froman; 14. Arthur Godfrey; 15. Al Jolson; 16. Spike Jones; 17. Danny Kaye; 18. Sammy Kaye; 19. Guy Lombardo; 20. Dean Martin; 21. Conrad Nagel; 22. Dick Powell; 23. Basil Rathbone; 24. Roy Rogers; 25. Charles Ruggles; 26. Dinah Shore; 27. Frank Sinatra; 28. Jo Stafford; 29. Gale Storm; 30. Fred Waring; 31. Marie Wilson	1. Bud Abbott; 2. Ben Alexander; 3. Desi Arnaz; 4. Gene Autry; 5. Lucille Ball; 6. Lynn Bari; 7. Jack Benny; 8. Edgar Bergen; 9. Charles Bickford; 10. Ray Bolger; 11. Charles Boyer; 12. Vanessa Brown; 13. George Burns; 14. Spring Byington; 15. Eddie Cantor; 16. Leo Carrillo; 17. Ilka Chase; 18. Ronald Colman; 19. Lou Costello; 20. Broderick Crawford; 21. Robert Cummings; 22. Bette Davis; 23. Yvonne DeCarlo; 24. Walt Disney; 25. Melvyn Douglas; 26. Paul Douglas; 27. James Dunn; 28. Faye Emerson; 29. Douglas Fairbanks Jr.; 30. Charles Farrell; 31. Barry Fitzgerald; 32. Errol Flynn; 33. Nina Foch; 34. Jon Hall; 35. Ann Harding; 36. Sir Cedric Hardwicke; 37. Rex Harrison; 38. June Havoc; 39. Louis Hayward; 40. Van Heflin; 41. Paul Henreid; 42. Alfred Hitchcock; 43. Celeste Holm; 44. Bob Hope; 45. Ron Howard; 46. Kim Hunter; 47. Boris Karloff; 48. Buster Keaton; 49. Arthur Kennedy; 50. Otto Kruger; 51. Angela Lansbury; 52. Jerry Lewis; 53. Gene Lockhart; 54. June Lockhart; 55. Edmund Lowe; 56. Ida Lupino; 57. Diana Lynn; 58. Dean Martin; 59. Tony Martin; 60. Raymond Massey; 61. Mercedes McCambridge; 62. Robert Montgomery; 63. Conrad Nagel; 64. David Niven; 65. Edmond O' Brien; 66. Margaret O'Brien; 67. Pat O' Brien; 68. Donald O' Connor; 69. John Payne; 70. Anthony Perkins; 71. Dick Powell; 72. Vincent Price; 73. George Raft; 74. Ella Raines; 75. Basil Rathbone; 76. Martha Raye; 77. Roy Rogers; 78. Cesar Romero; 79. Mickey Rooney; 80. Charles Ruggles; 81. Ann Rutherford; 82. Eva Marie Saint; 83. Frank Sinatra; 84. Barry Sullivan; 85. Gloria Swanson; 86. Kent Taylor; 87. Marie Wilson; 88. Teresa Wright; 89. Jane Wyman; 90. Ed Wynn; 91. Loretta Young; 92. Robert Young; 93. Roland Young

== A ==
Name	Category	Address	Date
Bud Abbott	Motion pictures	1611 Vine Street	February 8, 1960
Bud Abbott	Radio	6333 Hollywood Boulevard	February 8, 1960
Bud Abbott	Television	6740 Hollywood Boulevard	February 8, 1960
Paula Abdul	Recording	7021 Hollywood Boulevard	December 4, 1991
Harry Ackerman	Television	6661 Hollywood Boulevard	June 26, 1985
Art Acord	Motion pictures	1709 Vine Street	February 8, 1960
Roy Acuff	Recording	1541 Vine Street	February 8, 1960
Amy Adams	Motion pictures	6280 Hollywood Boulevard	January 11, 2017
Bryan Adams	Recording	6752 Hollywood Boulevard	March 21, 2011
Lou Adler	Recording	6901 Hollywood Boulevard	April 6, 2006
Stella Adler	Live performance	6777 Hollywood Boulevard	August 6, 2006
Renee Adoree	Motion pictures	1601 Vine Street	February 8, 1960
Antonio Aguilar	Recording	7060 Hollywood Boulevard	September 7, 2000
Pepe Aguilar	Recording	7060 Hollywood Boulevard	July 26, 2012
Christina Aguilera	Recording	6901 Hollywood Boulevard	November 15, 2010
Brian Aherne	Television	1752 Vine Street	February 8, 1960
Philip Ahn	Motion pictures	6211 Hollywood Boulevard	November 14, 1984
Air Supply	Recording	6126 Hollywood Boulevard	October 8, 2026
Alabama	Recording	7060 Hollywood Boulevard	October 6, 1998
Licia Albanese	Recording	6671 Hollywood Boulevard	February 8, 1960
Eddie Albert	Television	6441 Hollywood Boulevard	February 8, 1960
Frank Albertson	Motion pictures	6754 Hollywood Boulevard	February 8, 1960
Jack Albertson	Television	6253 Hollywood Boulevard	February 28, 1977
Neil A. Armstrong; Edwin E. Aldrin Jr. Michael Collins; 7/20/69; Apollo 11	Television	South side of the 6200 block of Hollywood Boulevard	July 20, 1973
Neil A. Armstrong; Edwin E. Aldrin Jr. Michael Collins; 7/20/69; Apollo 11	Television	South side of the 6300 block of Hollywood Boulevard	July 20, 1973
Neil A. Armstrong; Edwin E. Aldrin Jr. Michael Collins; 7/20/69; Apollo 11	Television	North side of the 6200 block of Hollywood Boulevard	July 20, 1973
Neil A. Armstrong; Edwin E. Aldrin Jr. Michael Collins; 7/20/69; Apollo 11	Television	North side of the 6300 block of Hollywood Boulevard	July 20, 1973
Ben Alexander	Television	6433 Hollywood Boulevard	February 8, 1960
Ben Alexander	Motion pictures	6400 Hollywood Boulevard	February 8, 1960
Ben Alexander	Radio	unknown	February 8, 1960
Muhammad Ali	Live performance	6801 Hollywood Boulevard	January 11, 2002
Byron Allen	Television	1749 Vine Street	October 20, 2021
Debbie Allen	Television	6908 Hollywood Boulevard	October 11, 1991
Fred Allen	Radio	6713 Hollywood Boulevard	February 8, 1960
Fred Allen	Television	7001 Hollywood Boulevard	February 8, 1960
Gracie Allen	Television	6672 Hollywood Boulevard	February 8, 1960
Rex Allen	Motion pictures	6821 Hollywood Boulevard	August 20, 1975
Steve Allen	Television	1720 Vine Street	February 8, 1960
Steve Allen	Radio	1537 Vine Street	February 8, 1960
Tim Allen	Motion pictures	6834 Hollywood Boulevard	November 19, 2004
Kirstie Alley	Motion pictures	7000 Hollywood Boulevard	November 10, 1995
Fran Allison	Television	6757 Hollywood Boulevard	February 8, 1960
June Allyson	Motion pictures	1537 Vine Street	February 8, 1960
Renan Almendarez; Coello	Radio	6141 Hollywood Boulevard	November 26, 2014
Herb Alpert	Recording	6929 Hollywood Boulevard	June 22, 1977
Don Alvarado	Motion pictures	6504 Hollywood Boulevard	February 8, 1960
Alvin and the Chipmunks	Television	6600 Hollywood Boulevard	March 14, 2019
Don Ameche	Television	6101 Hollywood Boulevard	February 8, 1960
Don Ameche	Radio	6313 Hollywood Boulevard	February 8, 1960
America	Recording	6752 Hollywood Boulevard	February 6, 2012
Adrienne Ames	Motion pictures	1612 Vine Street	February 8, 1960
Morey Amsterdam	Radio	6850 Hollywood Boulevard	February 8, 1960
Anthony Anderson	Television	6780 Hollywood Boulevard	August 14, 2020
Bronco Billy; Anderson (Note: Broncho Billy Anderson's star is misspelled as "Bronco".)	Motion pictures	1651 Vine Street	February 8, 1960
Eddie Anderson	Radio	6513 Hollywood Boulevard	February 8, 1960
Gillian Anderson	Television	6508 Hollywood Boulevard	January 8, 2018
Leroy Anderson	Recording	1620 Vine Street	February 8, 1960
Marian Anderson	Recording	6262 Hollywood Boulevard	February 8, 1960
Mary Anderson	Motion pictures	1645 Vine Street	February 8, 1960

Name	Category	Address	Date
Julie Andrews	Motion pictures	6901 Hollywood Boulevard	October 5, 1979
The Andrews Sisters	Recording	6834 Hollywood Boulevard	October 1, 1987
Criss Angel	Live performance	7018 Hollywood Boulevard	July 20, 2017
Heather Angel	Motion pictures	6301 Hollywood Boulevard	February 8, 1960
Jennifer Aniston	Motion pictures	6270 Hollywood Boulevard	February 22, 2012
Paul Anka	Recording	6840 Hollywood Boulevard	September 26, 1984
Ann — Margret	Motion pictures	6501 Hollywood Boulevard	July 11, 1973
Michael Ansara	Television	6666 Hollywood Boulevard	February 8, 1960
Marc Anthony	Recording	6284 Hollywood Boulevard	September 7, 2023
Ray Anthony	Recording	1751 Vine Street	February 8, 1960
Neil A. Armstrong; Edwin E. Aldrin Jr. Michael Collins; 7/20/69; Apollo 11	Television	South side of the 6200 block of Hollywood Boulevard	July 20, 1973
Neil A. Armstrong; Edwin E. Aldrin Jr. Michael Collins; 7/20/69; Apollo 11	Television	South side of the 6300 block of Hollywood Boulevard	July 20, 1973
Neil A. Armstrong; Edwin E. Aldrin Jr. Michael Collins; 7/20/69; Apollo 11	Television	North side of the 6200 block of Hollywood Boulevard	July 20, 1973
Neil A. Armstrong; Edwin E. Aldrin Jr. Michael Collins; 7/20/69; Apollo 11	Television	North side of the 6300 block of Hollywood Boulevard	July 20, 1973
Christina Applegate	Television	7007 Hollywood Boulevard	November 14, 2022
Roscoe Arbuckle	Motion pictures	6701 Hollywood Boulevard	February 8, 1960
Army Archerd	Television	6927 Hollywood Boulevard	June 27, 1984
Eve Arden	Television	6714 Hollywood Boulevard	February 8, 1960
Eve Arden	Radio	6329 Hollywood Boulevard	February 8, 1960
Alan Arkin	Motion pictures	6914 Hollywood Boulevard	June 7, 2019
Samuel Z Arkoff	Motion pictures	7046 Hollywood Boulevard	January 14, 1993
Richard Arlen	Motion pictures	6755 Hollywood Boulevard	February 8, 1960
George Arliss	Motion pictures	6652 Hollywood Boulevard	February 8, 1960
Louis Armstrong	Recording	7018 Hollywood Boulevard	February 8, 1960
Neil A. Armstrong; Edwin E. Aldrin Jr. Michael Collins; 7/20/69; Apollo 11	Television	South side of the 6200 block of Hollywood Boulevard	July 20, 1973
Neil A. Armstrong; Edwin E. Aldrin Jr. Michael Collins; 7/20/69; Apollo 11	Television	South side of the 6300 block of Hollywood Boulevard	July 20, 1973
Neil A. Armstrong; Edwin E. Aldrin Jr. Michael Collins; 7/20/69; Apollo 11	Television	North side of the 6200 block of Hollywood Boulevard	July 20, 1973
Neil A. Armstrong; Edwin E. Aldrin Jr. Michael Collins; 7/20/69; Apollo 11	Television	North side of the 6300 block of Hollywood Boulevard	July 20, 1973
Desi Arnaz	Motion pictures	6301 Hollywood Boulevard	February 8, 1960
Desi Arnaz	Television	6250 Hollywood Boulevard	February 8, 1960
James Arness	Television	1751 Vine Street	February 8, 1960
Eddy Arnold	Recording	6775 Hollywood Boulevard	February 8, 1960
Edward Arnold	Motion pictures (Note: The star for film and television actor Edward Arnold indicates "Recording", not "Motion pictures", same as the star for country music singer Eddy Arnold.)	6225 Hollywood Boulevard	February 8, 1960
Cliff Arquette	Radio	6720 Hollywood Boulevard	February 8, 1960
Ken Minyard & Bob Arthur	Radio	6808 Hollywood Boulevard	August 6, 1986
Jean Arthur	Motion pictures	6333 Hollywood Boulevard	February 8, 1960
Dorothy Arzner	Motion pictures	1500 Vine Street	January 24, 1986
Ashanti	Recording	7060 Hollywood Boulevard	April 7, 2022
Edward Asner	Television	6363 Hollywood Boulevard	September 17, 1992
Fred Astaire	Motion pictures	6756 Hollywood Boulevard	February 8, 1960
Nils Asther	Motion pictures	6705 Hollywood Boulevard	February 8, 1960
Mary Astor	Motion pictures	6701 Hollywood Boulevard	February 8, 1960
Gene Austin	Recording	6332 Hollywood Boulevard	February 8, 1960
Gene Autry	Motion pictures	6644 Hollywood Boulevard	February 8, 1960
Gene Autry	Radio	6520 Hollywood Boulevard	February 8, 1960
Gene Autry	Recording	6384 Hollywood Boulevard	February 8, 1960
Gene Autry	Television	6667 Hollywood Boulevard	February 8, 1960
Gene Autry	Live performance	7000 Hollywood Boulevard	April 6, 1987
Clarence Avant	Recording	6363 Hollywood Boulevard	October 7, 2016
Dan Avey	Radio	6834 Hollywood Boulevard	April 26, 2006
Agnes Ayres	Motion pictures	6504 Hollywood Boulevard	February 8, 1960
Lew Ayres	Motion pictures	6385 Hollywood Boulevard	February 8, 1960
Lew Ayres	Radio	1724 Vine Street	February 8, 1960
Charles Aznavour	Live performance	6225 Hollywood Boulevard	August 24, 2017

== B ==
Name	Category	Address	Date
The B-52s	Recording	6212 Hollywood Boulevard	October 29, 2026
Lauren Bacall	Motion pictures	1724 Vine Street	February 8, 1960
Backstreet Boys	Recording	7072 Hollywood Boulevard	April 22, 2013
Jim Backus	Television	1735 Vine Street	February 8, 1960
James Bacon	Motion pictures	1637 Vine Street	April 6, 2007
Kevin Bacon	Motion pictures	6356 Hollywood Boulevard	September 30, 2003
Lloyd Bacon	Motion pictures	7011 Hollywood Boulevard	February 8, 1960
King Baggot	Motion pictures	6312 Hollywood Boulevard	February 8, 1960
Jack Bailey	Radio	1708 Vine Street	February 8, 1960
Jack Bailey	Television	6411 Hollywood Boulevard	February 8, 1960
Pearl Bailey	Recording	7080 Hollywood Boulevard	February 1, 1994
Barbara Bain	Television	6767 Hollywood Boulevard	April 28, 2016
Fay Bainter	Motion pictures	7021 Hollywood Boulevard	February 8, 1960
Anita Baker	Recording	7021 Hollywood Boulevard	October 13, 1994
Art Baker	Radio	6509 Hollywood Boulevard	February 8, 1960
Carrol Baker	Motion pictures	1725 Vine Street	February 8, 1960
Kenny Baker	Radio	6329 Hollywood Boulevard	February 8, 1960
Phil Baker	Radio	6247 Hollywood Boulevard	February 8, 1960
Rick Baker	Motion pictures	6764 Hollywood Boulevard	November 30, 2012
Simon Baker	Television	6352 Hollywood Boulevard	February 14, 2013
Alec Baldwin	Television	6352 Hollywood Boulevard	February 14, 2011
Lucille Ball	Motion pictures	6436 Hollywood Boulevard	February 8, 1960
Lucille Ball	Television	6100 Hollywood Boulevard	February 8, 1960
Glen Ballard	Recording	6253 Hollywood Boulevard	July 11, 2024
Anne Bancroft	Television	6368 Hollywood Boulevard	February 8, 1960
Antonio Banderas	Motion pictures	6801 Hollywood Boulevard	October 18, 2005
Tallulah Bankhead	Motion pictures	6141 Hollywood Boulevard	February 8, 1960
Vilma Banky	Motion pictures	7021 Hollywood Boulevard	February 8, 1960
Theda Bara	Motion pictures	6307 Hollywood Boulevard	February 8, 1960
Hanna Barbera	Motion pictures	6753 Hollywood Boulevard	July 21, 1976
Javier Bardem	Motion pictures	6834 Hollywood Boulevard	November 8, 2012
Lynn Bari	Motion pictures	6116 Hollywood Boulevard	February 8, 1960
Lynn Bari	Television	6323 Hollywood Boulevard	February 8, 1960
Bob Barker	Television	6714 Hollywood Boulevard	May 5, 1976
Al Lohman & Roger Barkley	Radio	1540 Vine Street	December 4, 1985
Binnie Barnes	Motion pictures	1501 Vine Street	February 8, 1960
Pepe Barreto	Television	6536 Hollywood Boulevard	May 3, 2004
Mona Barrie	Motion pictures	6140 Hollywood Boulevard	February 8, 1960
Wendy Barrie	Motion pictures	1708 Vine Street	February 8, 1960
Bessie Barriscale	Motion pictures	6652 Hollywood Boulevard	February 8, 1960
Blue Barron	Recording	1724 Vine Street	February 8, 1960
Gene Barry	Live performance	6555 Hollywood Boulevard	May 5, 1988
Drew Barrymore	Motion pictures	6925 Hollywood Boulevard	February 3, 2004
Ethel Barrymore	Motion pictures	7001 Hollywood Boulevard	February 8, 1960
John Barrymore	Motion pictures	6667 Hollywood Boulevard	February 8, 1960
John Drew Barrymore	Television	7004 Hollywood Boulevard	February 8, 1960
Lionel Barrymore	Motion pictures	1724 Vine Street	February 8, 1960
Lionel Barrymore	Radio	1651 Vine Street	February 8, 1960
Richard Barthelmess	Motion pictures	6755 Hollywood Boulevard	February 8, 1960
Freddie Bartholomew	Motion pictures	6663 Hollywood Boulevard	February 8, 1960
Billy Barty	Motion pictures	6922 Hollywood Boulevard	July 1, 1981
Richard Basehart	Motion pictures	6276 Hollywood Boulevard	February 8, 1960
Count Basie	Recording	6508 Hollywood Boulevard	January 27, 1982
Kim Basinger	Motion pictures	7021 Hollywood Boulevard	July 8, 1992
Lina Basquette	Motion pictures	1529 Vine Street	February 8, 1960
Angela Bassett	Motion pictures	7000 Hollywood Boulevard	March 20, 2008
Jason Bateman	Motion pictures	6533 Hollywood Boulevard	July 26, 2017
Kathy Bates	Motion pictures	6927 Hollywood Boulevard	September 20, 2016
Batman	Motion pictures	6764 Hollywood Boulevard	September 26, 2024
Anne Baxter	Motion pictures	6741 Hollywood Boulevard	February 8, 1960
Dr. Frank C. Baxter	Television	6717 Hollywood Boulevard	February 8, 1960
Les Baxter	Recording	6314 Hollywood Boulevard	February 8, 1960
Warner Baxter	Motion pictures	6284 Hollywood Boulevard	February 8, 1960
Beverly Bayne	Motion pictures	1752 Vine Street	February 8, 1960
Beach Boys	Recording	1500 Vine Street	December 30, 1980
The Beatles	Recording	7080 Hollywood Boulevard	December 25, 1998
William Beaudine	Motion pictures	1777 Vine Street	February 8, 1960
David Beckham	Sports Entertainment	6819 Hollywood Boulevard	June 12, 2026
Bee Gees	Recording	6845 Hollywood Boulevard	January 12, 1979
Noah Beery Jr.	Television	7047 Hollywood Boulevard	February 8, 1960
Wallace Beery	Motion pictures	7001 Hollywood Boulevard	February 8, 1960
Brian Beirne	Radio	6777 Hollywood Boulevard	January 18, 1991
Harry Belafonte	Recording	6721 Hollywood Boulevard	February 8, 1960
Kristen Bell	Motion pictures	6225 Hollywood Boulevard	November 19, 2019
Madge Bellamy	Motion pictures	6517 Hollywood Boulevard	February 8, 1960
Ralph Bellamy	Television	6542 Hollywood Boulevard	February 8, 1960
Donald P. Bellisario	Television	7080 Hollywood Boulevard	March 2, 2004
John Belushi	Motion pictures	6355 Hollywood Boulevard	April 1, 2004
Bea Benaderet	Television	1611 Vine Street	February 8, 1960
Robert Benchley	Motion pictures	1724 Vine Street	February 8, 1960
William Bendix	Radio	1638 Vine Street	February 8, 1960
William Bendix	Television	6251 Hollywood Boulevard	February 8, 1960
Tex Beneke	Recording	6200 Hollywood Boulevard	September 12, 1991
Annette Bening	Motion pictures	6927 Hollywood Boulevard	November 10, 2006
Belle Bennett	Motion pictures	1511 Vine Street	February 8, 1960
Constance Bennett	Motion pictures	6250 Hollywood Boulevard	February 8, 1960
Joan Bennett	Motion pictures	6300 Hollywood Boulevard	February 8, 1960
Tony Bennett	Recording	1560 Vine Street	February 8, 1960
Jack Benny	Motion pictures	6650 Hollywood Boulevard	February 8, 1960
Jack Benny	Radio	1505 Vine Street	February 8, 1960
Jack Benny	Television	6370 Hollywood Boulevard	February 8, 1960
George Benson	Recording	7055 Hollywood Boulevard	September 19, 1996
John Beradino	Television	6801 Hollywood Boulevard	April 1, 1993
Edgar Bergen	Television	6425 Hollywood Boulevard	February 8, 1960
Edgar Bergen	Motion pictures	6766 Hollywood Boulevard	February 8, 1960
Edgar Bergen	Radio	6801 Hollywood Boulevard	February 8, 1960
Ingrid Bergman	Motion pictures	6759 Hollywood Boulevard	February 8, 1960
Greg Berlanti	Television	6420 Hollywood Boulevard	May 23, 2022
Milton Berle	Radio	6771 Hollywood Boulevard	February 8, 1960
Milton Berle	Television	6263 Hollywood Boulevard	February 8, 1960
Irving Berlin	Recording	7095 Hollywood Boulevard	September 8, 1994
Chris Berman	Television	6259 Hollywood Boulevard	May 24, 2010
Ernani Bernardi	Recording	7072 Hollywood Boulevard	February 1, 1994
Sarah Bernhardt	Motion pictures	1751 Vine Street	February 8, 1960
Ben Bernie	Radio	6280 Hollywood Boulevard	February 8, 1960
Elmer Bernstein	Motion pictures	7083 Hollywood Boulevard	March 28, 1996
Leonard Bernstein	Recording	6200 Hollywood Boulevard	February 8, 1960
Chuck Berry	Recording	1777 Vine Street	October 8, 1987
Halle Berry	Motion pictures	6801 Hollywood Boulevard	April 3, 2007
Valerie Bertinelli	Television	6912 Hollywood Boulevard	August 22, 2012
Bernardo Bertolucci	Motion pictures	6901 Hollywood Boulevard	November 19, 2013
Edna Best	Motion pictures	6124 Hollywood Boulevard	February 8, 1960
Charles Bickford	Television	1620 Vine Street	February 8, 1960
Charles Bickford	Motion pictures	6780 Hollywood Boulevard	February 8, 1960
Big Bird	Television	7021 Hollywood Boulevard	April 21, 1994
Kurt Alexander "Big Boy"	Radio	6212 Hollywood Boulevard	September 8, 2021
E Power Biggs	Recording	6522 Hollywood Boulevard	February 8, 1960
Theodore Bikel	Live performance	6233 Hollywood Boulevard	April 29, 2005
Rodney; Bingenheimer	Radio	7021 Hollywood Boulevard	March 9, 2007
Constance Binney	Motion pictures	6301 Hollywood Boulevard	February 8, 1960
Clint Black	Recording	7080 Hollywood Boulevard	December 12, 1996
Jack Black	Motion pictures	6441 Hollywood Boulevard	September 18, 2018
Sidney Blackmer	Motion pictures	1625 Vine Street	February 8, 1960

Name	Category	Address	Date
Carlyle Blackwell	Motion pictures	6340 Hollywood Boulevard	February 8, 1960
Mel Blanc	Radio	6385 Hollywood Boulevard	February 8, 1960
Cate Blanchett	Motion pictures	6712 Hollywood Boulevard	December 5, 2008
Richard Blade	Radio	1725 Vine Street	June 6, 2024
Mary J. Blige	Recording	6201 Hollywood Boulevard	January 11, 2018
Joan Blondell	Motion pictures	6311 Hollywood Boulevard	February 8, 1960
Orlando Bloom	Motion pictures	6927 Hollywood Boulevard	April 2, 2014
Monte Blue	Motion pictures	6290 Hollywood Boulevard	February 8, 1960
Emily Blunt	Motion pictures	6930 Hollywood Boulevard	April 30, 2026
Ann Blyth	Motion pictures	6733 Hollywood Boulevard	February 8, 1960
Betty Blythe	Motion pictures	1708 Vine Street	February 8, 1960
Eleanor Boardman	Motion pictures	6928 Hollywood Boulevard	February 8, 1960
Andrea Bocelli	Live performance	7000 Hollywood Boulevard	March 2, 2010
Humphrey Bogart	Motion pictures	6322 Hollywood Boulevard	February 8, 1960
Mary Boland	Motion pictures	6150 Hollywood Boulevard	February 8, 1960
John Boles	Motion pictures	6530 Hollywood Boulevard	February 8, 1960
Richard Boleslawski	Motion pictures	7021 Hollywood Boulevard	February 8, 1960
Ray Bolger	Motion pictures	6788 Hollywood Boulevard	February 8, 1960
Ray Bolger	Television	6834 Hollywood Boulevard	February 8, 1960
Michael Bolton	Recording	7018 Hollywood Boulevard	August 27, 2002
Ford Bond	Radio	6706 Hollywood Boulevard	February 8, 1960
Ward Bond	Television	6933 Hollywood Boulevard	February 8, 1960
Beulah Bondi	Motion pictures	1718 Vine Street	February 8, 1960
Bone Thugs-N-Harmony	Recording	6126 Hollywood Boulevard	July 8, 2026
Pat Boone	Recording	1631 Vine Street	February 8, 1960
Pat Boone	Television	6268 Hollywood Boulevard	February 8, 1960
Shirley Booth	Motion pictures	6850 Hollywood Boulevard	February 8, 1960
Olive Borden	Motion pictures	6801 Hollywood Boulevard	August 15, 1958
Ernest Borgnine	Motion pictures	6324 Hollywood Boulevard	February 8, 1960
Frank Borzage	Motion pictures	6300 Hollywood Boulevard	February 8, 1960
Chadwick Boseman	Motion pictures	6904 Hollywood Boulevard	November 20, 2025
Hobart Bosworth	Motion pictures	6522 Hollywood Boulevard	February 8, 1960
Clara Bow	Motion pictures	1500 Vine Street	February 8, 1960
John Bowers	Motion pictures	1709 Vine Street	February 8, 1960
Major Bowes	Radio	1513 Vine Street	February 8, 1960
David Bowie	Recording	7021 Hollywood Boulevard	February 12, 1997
Bill Boyd	Radio	6101 Hollywood Boulevard	February 8, 1960
Jimmy Boyd	Recording	7021 Hollywood Boulevard	February 8, 1960
William Boyd	Motion pictures	1734 Vine Street	February 8, 1960
Charles Boyer	Motion pictures	6300 Hollywood Boulevard	February 8, 1960
Charles Boyer	Television	6300 Hollywood Boulevard	February 8, 1960
Boyz II Men	Recording	7060 Hollywood Boulevard	January 5, 2012
Eddie Bracken	Television	6751 Hollywood Boulevard	February 8, 1960
Eddie Bracken	Radio	1651 Vine Street	February 8, 1960
Ray Bradbury	Motion pictures	6644 Hollywood Boulevard	October 18, 2002
Mayor Tom Bradley (Note: The text on Bradley's star includes his term as mayor: "Mayor Tom Bradley 1973—1993")	Special	7000 Hollywood Boulevard	January 1, 1984
Terry Bradshaw	Television	7080 Hollywood Boulevard	October 11, 2001
Alice Brady	Motion pictures	6201 Hollywood Boulevard	February 8, 1960
Eric Braeden	Television	7021 Hollywood Boulevard	July 20, 2007
Marlon Brando	Motion pictures	1765 Vine Street	February 8, 1960
Brandy	Recording	6201 Hollywood Boulevard	March 30, 2026
Sir Richard Branson	Recording	6764 Hollywood Boulevard	October 16, 2018
Tom Breneman	Radio	6290 Hollywood Boulevard	February 8, 1960
Walter Brennan	Motion pictures	6501 Hollywood Boulevard	February 8, 1960
Evelyn Brent	Motion pictures	6548 Hollywood Boulevard	February 8, 1960
George Brent	Motion pictures	1709 Vine Street	February 8, 1960
George Brent	Television	1612 Vine Street	February 8, 1960
Teresa Brewer	Recording	1708 Vine Street	February 8, 1960
Mark & Brian	Radio	6767 Hollywood Boulevard	September 25, 1997
David Brian	Television	7021 Hollywood Boulevard	February 8, 1960
Mary Brian	Motion pictures	1559 Vine Street	February 8, 1960
Fanny Brice	Motion pictures	6415 Hollywood Boulevard	February 8, 1960
Fanny Brice	Radio	1500 Vine Street	February 8, 1960
Beau Bridges	Television	7065 Hollywood Boulevard	April 7, 2003
Jeff Bridges	Motion pictures	7065 Hollywood Boulevard	July 11, 1994
Lloyd Bridges	Television	7065 Hollywood Boulevard	February 1, 1994
Ray Briem	Radio	6125 Hollywood Boulevard	October 22, 1992
Sarah Brightman	Live performance	6243 Hollywood Boulevard	October 6, 2022
Bernie Brillstein	Motion pictures	7018 Hollywood Boulevard	April 18, 2001
Elton Britt	Recording	6936 Hollywood Boulevard	February 8, 1960
Barbara Britton	Television	1719 Vine Street	February 8, 1960
Cubby Broccoli	Motion pictures	6910 Hollywood Boulevard	January 6, 1990
Matthew Broderick	Motion pictures	6801 Hollywood Boulevard	January 9, 2006
James Brolin	Television	7018 Hollywood Boulevard	August 27, 1998
Charles Bronson	Motion pictures	6901 Hollywood Boulevard	December 10, 1980
Hillary Brooke	Television	6311 Hollywood Boulevard	February 8, 1960
Brooks & Dunn	Recording	7021 Hollywood Boulevard	August 4, 2008
Garth Brooks	Recording	1750 Vine Street	June 30, 1995
James L. Brooks	Television	6910 Hollywood Boulevard	December 11, 2025
Mel Brooks	Motion pictures	6712 Hollywood Boulevard	April 23, 2010
Richard Brooks	Motion pictures	6422 Hollywood Boulevard	February 8, 1960
Pierce Brosnan	Motion pictures	7083 Hollywood Boulevard	December 3, 1997
Cecil Brown	Radio	6410 Hollywood Boulevard	February 8, 1960
Clarence Brown	Motion pictures	1752 Vine Street	February 8, 1960
Harry Joe Brown	Motion pictures	1777 Vine Street	February 8, 1960
James Brown	Recording	1501 Vine Street	January 10, 1997
Joe E. Brown	Motion pictures	1680 Vine Street	February 8, 1960
Johnny Mack Brown	Motion pictures	6101 Hollywood Boulevard	February 8, 1960
Les Brown	Recording	6505 Hollywood Boulevard	February 8, 1960
Tom Brown	Motion pictures	1648 Vine Street	February 8, 1960
Vanessa Brown	Motion pictures	1621 Vine Street	February 8, 1960
Vanessa Brown	Television	6528 Hollywood Boulevard	February 8, 1960
Tod Browning	Motion pictures	6225 Hollywood Boulevard	February 8, 1960
Dave Brubeck	Recording	1716 Vine Street	February 8, 1960
Jerry Bruckheimer	Motion pictures	6838 Hollywood Boulevard	June 24, 2013
Yul Brynner	Motion pictures	6162 Hollywood Boulevard	February 8, 1960
Michael Bublé	Recording	6270 Hollywood Boulevard	November 16, 2018
Sandra Bullock	Motion pictures	6801 Hollywood Boulevard	March 25, 2005
Bugs Bunny	Motion pictures	7007 Hollywood Boulevard	December 10, 1985
John Bunny	Motion pictures	1715 Vine Street	February 8, 1960
Billie Burke	Motion pictures	6617 Hollywood Boulevard	February 8, 1960
Sonny Burke	Recording	6920 Hollywood Boulevard	February 8, 1960
Carol Burnett	Television	6439 Hollywood Boulevard	May 21, 1975
Mark Burnett	Television	6664 Hollywood Boulevard	July 18, 2009
Smiley Burnette	Motion pictures	6125 Hollywood Boulevard	May 22, 1996
Bob Burns	Motion pictures	1601 Vine Street	February 8, 1960
Bob Burns	Radio	6541 Hollywood Boulevard	February 8, 1960
George Burns	Live performance	6672 Hollywood Boulevard	November 8, 1984
George Burns	Motion pictures	1639 Vine Street	February 8, 1960
George Burns	Television	6510 Hollywood Boulevard	February 8, 1960
Raymond Burr	Television	6656 Hollywood Boulevard	February 8, 1960
Bill Burrud	Television	6777 Hollywood Boulevard	August 24, 1977
Levar Burton	Television	7000 Hollywood Boulevard	November 15, 1990
Richard Burton	Motion pictures	6336 Hollywood Boulevard	March 1, 2013
Tim Burton	Motion pictures	6600 Hollywood Boulevard	September 3, 2024
Mae Busch	Motion pictures	7021 Hollywood Boulevard	February 8, 1960
Francis X. Bushman	Motion pictures	1651 Vine Street	February 8, 1960
Jerry Buss	Television	6801 Hollywood Boulevard	October 30, 2006
David Butler	Motion pictures	6561 Hollywood Boulevard	February 8, 1960
Charles Butterworth	Motion pictures	7036 Hollywood Boulevard	February 8, 1960
Red Buttons	Television	1651 Vine Street	February 8, 1960
Pat Buttram	Motion pictures	6382 Hollywood Boulevard	August 18, 1988
Spring Byington	Motion pictures	6507 Hollywood Boulevard	February 8, 1960
Spring Byington	Television	6231 Hollywood Boulevard	February 8, 1960

== C ==
Name	Category	Address	Date
James Caan	Motion pictures	6648 Hollywood Boulevard	August 16, 1978
Shirley Caesar	Recording	6126 Hollywood Boulevard	June 28, 2016
Sid Caesar	Television	7014 Hollywood Boulevard	February 8, 1960
Nicolas Cage	Motion pictures	7021 Hollywood Boulevard	July 31, 1998
James Cagney	Motion pictures	6504 Hollywood Boulevard	February 8, 1960
Sammy Cahn	Recording	6540 Hollywood Boulevard	February 2, 1990
Alice Calhoun	Motion pictures	6815 Hollywood Boulevard	December 31, 1969
Rory Calhoun	Motion pictures	7007 Hollywood Boulevard	February 8, 1960
Rory Calhoun	Television	1752 Vine Street	February 8, 1960
Maria Callas	Recording	1680 Vine Street	February 8, 1960
James Cameron	Motion pictures	6712 Hollywood Boulevard	December 18, 2009
Rod Cameron	Television	1720 Vine Street	February 8, 1960
Glen Campbell	Recording	6925 Hollywood Boulevard	February 8, 1960
Stephen J Cannell	Television	7000 Hollywood Boulevard	January 14, 1986
Dyan Cannon	Motion pictures	6608 Hollywood Boulevard	June 22, 1983
Judy Canova	Motion pictures	6821 Hollywood Boulevard	February 8, 1960
Judy Canova	Radio	6777 Hollywood Boulevard	February 8, 1960
Cantinflas	Motion pictures	6438 Hollywood Boulevard	October 10, 1980
Eddie Cantor	Motion pictures	6648 Hollywood Boulevard	February 8, 1960
Eddie Cantor	Television	1770 Vine Street	February 8, 1960
Eddie Cantor	Radio	6765 Hollywood Boulevard	February 8, 1960
Yakima Canutt	Motion pictures	1500 Vine Street	August 14, 1985
Capitol Records	Special	1750 Vine Street	November 15, 2016
Frank Capra	Motion pictures	6614 Hollywood Boulevard	February 8, 1960
Steve Carell	Motion pictures	6708 Hollywood Boulevard	January 6, 2016
Drew Carey	Television	6664 Hollywood Boulevard	February 21, 2003
Harry Carey	Motion pictures	1521 Vine Street	February 8, 1960
Harry Carey Jr.	Television	6363 Vine Street	February 8, 1960
Macdonald Carey	Television	6536 Hollywood Boulevard	February 8, 1960
Mariah Carey	Recording	6270 Hollywood Boulevard	August 5, 2015
Frankie Carle	Recording	1751 Hollywood Boulevard	February 8, 1960
George Carlin	Live performance	1555 Vine Street	January 21, 1987
Kitty Carlisle	Motion pictures	6611 Hollywood Boulevard	February 8, 1960
Mary Carlisle	Motion pictures	6679 Hollywood Boulevard	February 8, 1960
Richard Carlson	Television	6333 Hollywood Boulevard	February 8, 1960
Hoagy Carmichael	Television	1720 Vine Street	February 8, 1960
Art Carney	Television	6627 Hollywood Boulevard	February 8, 1960
Adam Carolla	Radio	6777 Hollywood Boulevard	May 27, 2026
Leslie Caron	Motion pictures	6153 Hollywood Boulevard	December 8, 2009
John Carpenter	Motion pictures	7000 Hollywood Boulevard	April 3, 2025
Ken Carpenter	Radio	6706 Hollywood Boulevard	February 8, 1960
The Carpenters	Recording	6931 Hollywood Boulevard	October 12, 1983
Vikki Carr	Recording	6385 Hollywood Boulevard	September 23, 1981
David Carradine	Television	7021 Hollywood Boulevard	April 1, 1997
John Carradine	Motion pictures	6240 Hollywood Boulevard	February 8, 1960
Keith Carradine	Television	6233 Hollywood Boulevard	July 15, 1993
Leo Carrillo	Motion pictures	1635 Vine Street	February 8, 1960
Leo Carrillo	Television	1517 Vine Street	February 8, 1960
Diahann Carroll	Recording	7005 Hollywood Boulevard	April 3, 1990
Madeleine Carroll	Motion pictures	6707 Hollywood Boulevard	February 8, 1960
Nancy Carroll	Motion pictures	1725 Vine Street	February 8, 1960
Jack Carson	Radio	6361 Hollywood Boulevard	February 8, 1960
Jack Carson	Television	1560 Vine Street	February 8, 1960
Jeannie Carson	Television	1560 Vine Street	February 8, 1960
Johnny Carson	Television	1751 Vine Street	February 8, 1960
Benny Carter	Recording	7080 Hollywood Boulevard	February 9, 1995
Lynda Carter	Television	6562 Hollywood Boulevard	April 3, 2018
Ruth E. Carter	Motion pictures	6800 Hollywood Boulevard	February 25, 2021
Enrico Caruso	Recording	6625 Hollywood Boulevard	February 8, 1960
Robert Casadesus	Recording	6251 Hollywood Boulevard	February 8, 1960
Johnny Cash	Recording	6320 Hollywood Boulevard	March 9, 1976
Syd Cassyd	Television	7080 Hollywood Boulevard	August 15, 1996
Peggie Castle	Television	6266 Hollywood Boulevard	February 8, 1960
Gil Cates	Motion pictures	7065 Hollywood Boulevard	March 9, 1995
Walter Catlett	Motion pictures	1713 Vine Street	February 8, 1960
Joan Caulfield	Television	1500 Vine Street	February 8, 1960
Carmen Cavallaro	Recording	6301 Hollywood Boulevard	February 8, 1960
Cedric the Entertainer	Live performance	6212 Hollywood Boulevard	July 19, 2018
Bennett Cerf	Television	6407 Hollywood Boulevard	February 8, 1960
Feodor Chaliapin	Recording	6770 Hollywood Boulevard	February 8, 1960
Richard Chamberlain	Television	7018 Hollywood Boulevard	February 29, 2000
John Chambers	Motion pictures	7006 Hollywood Boulevard	January 24, 1979
Stan Chambers	Television	6922 Hollywood Boulevard	December 1, 1982
Gower Champion	Television	6162 Hollywood Boulevard	February 8, 1960
Marge Champion	Television	6282 Hollywood Boulevard	February 8, 1960
Charles Champlin	Television	6751 Hollywood Boulevard	August 3, 2007
Jackie Chan	Motion pictures	6801 Hollywood Boulevard	October 4, 2002
Jeff Chandler	Motion pictures	1770 Vine Street	February 8, 1960
Lon Chaney	Motion pictures	7046 Hollywood Boulevard	February 8, 1960
Carol Channing	Television	6233 Hollywood Boulevard	November 30, 1977
Charles Chaplin	Motion pictures	6751 Hollywood Boulevard	April 10, 1972
Marguerite; Chapman	Television	6284 Hollywood Boulevard	February 8, 1960
Cyd Charisse	Motion pictures	1601 Vine Street	February 8, 1960
Ray Charles	Recording	6777 Hollywood Boulevard	December 16, 1981
Charley Chase	Motion pictures	6630 Hollywood Boulevard	February 8, 1960
Chevy Chase	Motion pictures	7021 Hollywood Boulevard	September 23, 1993
Ilka Chase	Motion pictures	6361 Hollywood Boulevard	February 8, 1960
Ilka Chase	Television	6751 Hollywood Boulevard	February 8, 1960
Jessica Chastain	Motion pictures	6258 Hollywood Boulevard	September 4, 2025
Ruth Chatterton	Motion pictures	6263 Hollywood Boulevard	February 8, 1960
Kristin Chenoweth	Live performance	6243 Hollywood Boulevard	July 24, 2015
Sonny & Cher	Television	7018 Hollywood Boulevard	May 15, 1998
Virginia Cherrill	Motion pictures	1545 Vine Street	February 8, 1960
Morris Chestnut	Motion pictures	6353 Hollywood Boulevard	March 23, 2022
Maurice Chevalier	Motion pictures	1651 Vine Street	February 8, 1960
Chevrolet Suburban	Special	Ovation Hollywood	December 5, 2019
Chicago	Recording	6438 Hollywood Boulevard	July 23, 1992
The Chi-Lites	Recording	7057 Hollywood Boulevard	September 30, 2021
Al Christie	Motion pictures	6771 Hollywood Boulevard	February 8, 1960
Charles Christie	Motion pictures	1719 Vine Street	February 8, 1960
Guy Laliberté; Cirque du Soleil	Live performance	6801 Hollywood Boulevard	November 22, 2010
Ina Claire	Motion pictures	6150 Hollywood Boulevard	February 8, 1960
Buddy Clark	Recording	6800 Hollywood Boulevard	February 8, 1960
Dane Clark	Television	6906 Hollywood Boulevard	February 8, 1960
Dick Clark	Television	Sunset & Vine	August 4, 1976
Fred Clark	Television	1711 Vine Street	February 8, 1960
Marguerite Clark	Motion pictures	6300 Vine Street	February 8, 1960
Roy Clark	Recording	6840 Hollywood Boulevard	February 12, 1975
Kelly Clarkson	Recording	6801 Hollywood Boulevard	September 19, 2022
Ethel Clayton	Motion pictures	6936 Hollywood Boulevard	February 8, 1960
Jan Clayton	Television	6200 Hollywood Boulevard	February 8, 1960
Rev. James Cleveland	Recording	6742 Hollywood Boulevard	August 12, 1981
Montgomery Clift	Motion pictures	6104 Hollywood Boulevard	February 8, 1960
Patsy Cline	Recording	6160 Hollywood Boulevard	August 3, 1999
George Clinton	Recording	6752 Hollywood Boulevard	January 19, 2024
Rosemary Clooney	Recording	6325 Hollywood Boulevard	February 8, 1960
Glenn Close	Motion pictures	7000 Hollywood Boulevard	January 12, 2009
Andy Clyde	Motion pictures	6758 Hollywood Boulevard	February 8, 1960
Charles Coburn	Motion pictures	6240 Hollywood Boulevard	February 8, 1960
James Coburn	Motion pictures	7055 Hollywood Boulevard	February 1, 1994
Imogene Coca	Television	6256 Hollywood Boulevard	February 8, 1960
Steve Cochran	Motion pictures	1750 Hollywood Boulevard	February 8, 1960
Iron Eyes Cody	Television	6655 Hollywood Boulevard	April 20, 1983

Name	Category	Address	Date
George M. Cohan	Motion pictures	6734 Hollywood Boulevard	February 8, 1960
Andy Cohen	Television	6652 Hollywood Boulevard	February 4, 2022
Arthur Cohn	Motion pictures	7000 Hollywood Boulevard	November 17, 1992
Claudette Colbert	Motion pictures	6812 Hollywood Boulevard	February 8, 1960
Nat "King" Cole	Recording	6659 Hollywood Boulevard	February 8, 1960
Nat "King" Cole	Television	6229 Hollywood Boulevard	February 8, 1960
Natalie Cole	Recording	1750 Vine Street	February 5, 1979
Dabney Coleman	Television	6141 Hollywood Boulevard	November 6, 2014
Constance; Collier	Motion pictures	6231 Hollywood Boulevard	February 8, 1960
William Collier	Motion pictures	6340 Hollywood Boulevard	February 8, 1960
Gary Collins	Television	6922 Hollywood Boulevard	September 18, 1985
Joan Collins	Television	6901 Hollywood Boulevard	December 14, 1983
Neil A. Armstrong; Edwin E. Aldrin Jr. Michael Collins; 7/20/69; Apollo 11	Television	South side of the 6200 block of Hollywood Boulevard	July 20, 1973
Neil A. Armstrong; Edwin E. Aldrin Jr. Michael Collins; 7/20/69; Apollo 11	Television	South side of the 6300 block of Hollywood Boulevard	July 20, 1973
Neil A. Armstrong; Edwin E. Aldrin Jr. Michael Collins; 7/20/69; Apollo 11	Television	North side of the 6200 block of Hollywood Boulevard	July 20, 1973
Neil A. Armstrong; Edwin E. Aldrin Jr. Michael Collins; 7/20/69; Apollo 11	Television	North side of the 6300 block of Hollywood Boulevard	July 20, 1973
Phil Collins	Recording	6834 Hollywood Boulevard	June 16, 1999
Bud Collyer	Radio	6150 Hollywood Boulevard	February 8, 1960
Ronald Colman	Television	1623 Vine Street	February 8, 1960
Ronald Colman	Motion pictures	6801 Hollywood Boulevard	February 8, 1960
Jerry Colonna	Radio	1645 Vine Street	February 8, 1960
Sean Diddy Combs	Recording	6801 Hollywood Boulevard	May 22, 2008
Perry Como	Radio	1708 Vine Street	February 8, 1960
Perry Como	Television	6376 Hollywood Boulevard	February 8, 1960
Perry Como	Recording	6600 Hollywood Boulevard	February 8, 1960
Betty Compson	Motion pictures	1751 Vine Street	February 8, 1960
Joyce Compton	Motion pictures	7000 Hollywood Boulevard	February 8, 1960
Chester Conklin	Motion pictures	1560 Vine Street	February 8, 1960
Heinie Conklin	Motion pictures	1776 Vine Street	February 8, 1960
Harry Connick Jr.	Recording	7080 Hollywood Boulevard	October 24, 2019
Chuck Connors	Television	6838 Hollywood Boulevard	July 18, 1984
Hans Conried	Television	6664 Hollywood Boulevard	February 8, 1960
John Conte	Television	6119 Hollywood Boulevard	February 8, 1960
Bill Conti	Motion pictures	6541 Hollywood Boulevard	November 10, 1989
Jack Conway	Motion pictures	1500 Vine Street	February 8, 1960
Tim Conway	Television	6740 Hollywood Boulevard	February 9, 1989
Tom Conway	Television	1617 Vine Street	February 8, 1960
Jackie Coogan	Motion pictures	1654 Vine Street	February 8, 1960
Clyde Cook	Motion pictures	6531 Hollywood Boulevard	February 8, 1960
Donald Cook	Motion pictures	1718 Vine Street	February 8, 1960
Alistair Cooke	Television	1651 Vine Street	February 8, 1960
Sam Cooke	Recording	7051 Hollywood Boulevard	February 1, 1994
Spade Cooley	Radio	6802 Hollywood Boulevard	February 8, 1960
Alice Cooper	Recording	7000 Hollywood Boulevard	December 2, 2003
Gary Cooper	Motion pictures	6243 Hollywood Boulevard	February 8, 1960
Jackie Cooper	Motion pictures	1507 Vine Street	February 8, 1960
Jeanne Cooper	Television	1777 Vine Street	August 20, 1993
Meriam C. Cooper (Note: Merian Cooper's star is misspelled as "Meriam".)	Motion pictures	6525 Hollywood Boulevard	February 8, 1960
David Copperfield	Live performance	7021 Hollywood Boulevard	April 25, 1995
Francis Ford Coppola	Motion pictures	6667 Hollywood Boulevard	March 21, 2022
Ken Corday	Television	6201 Hollywood Boulevard	May 15, 2017
Wendell Corey	Television	6328 Hollywood Boulevard	February 8, 1960
Roger Corman	Motion pictures	7013 Hollywood Boulevard	June 12, 1991
Don Cornelius	Television	7080 Hollywood Boulevard	February 27, 1997
Don Cornell	Recording	6138 Hollywood Boulevard	February 8, 1960
Charles Correll; Andy	Radio	1777 Vine Street	February 8, 1960
Ricardo Cortez	Motion pictures	1500 Vine Street	February 8, 1960
Bill Cosby	Television	6930 Hollywood Boulevard	November 23, 1977
Pierre Cossette	Television	6233 Hollywood Boulevard	February 7, 2005
Dolores Costello	Motion pictures	1645 Vine Street	February 8, 1960
Helene Costello	Motion pictures	1500 Vine Street	February 8, 1960
Lou Costello	Motion pictures	6438 Hollywood Boulevard	February 8, 1960
Lou Costello	Radio	6780 Hollywood Boulevard	February 8, 1960
Lou Costello	Television	6276 Hollywood Boulevard	February 8, 1960
Maurice Costello	Motion pictures	6515 Hollywood Boulevard	February 8, 1960
Kevin Costner	Motion pictures	6801 Hollywood Boulevard	August 11, 2003
Joseph Cotten	Motion pictures	6382 Hollywood Boulevard	February 8, 1960
Jerome Cowan	Television	6251 Hollywood Boulevard	February 8, 1960
Simon Cowell	Television	6801 Hollywood Boulevard	August 22, 2018
Courteney Cox	Television	6284 Hollywood Boulevard	February 27, 2023
Wally Cox	Television	6385 Hollywood Boulevard	February 8, 1960
Buster Crabbe	Television	6901 Hollywood Boulevard	February 8, 1960
Daniel Craig	Motion pictures	7007 Hollywood Boulevard	October 6, 2021
Bryan Cranston	Television	1717 Vine Street	July 16, 2013
Broderick; Crawford	Motion pictures	6901 Hollywood Boulevard	February 8, 1960
Broderick; Crawford	Television	6736 Hollywood Boulevard	February 8, 1960
Joan Crawford	Motion pictures	1752 Vine Street	February 8, 1960
Laird Cregar	Motion pictures	1716 Vine Street	February 8, 1960
Richard Crenna	Motion pictures	6714 Hollywood Boulevard	May 23, 1988
Laura Hope Crews	Motion pictures	6251 Hollywood Boulevard	February 8, 1960
Terry Crews	Television	6201 Hollywood Boulevard	July 30, 2021
Donald Crisp	Motion pictures	1628 Vine Street	February 8, 1960
John Cromwell	Motion pictures	6555 Hollywood Boulevard	February 8, 1960
Richard Cromwell	Motion pictures	1627 Vine Street	February 8, 1960
Richard Crooks	Recording	1648 Vine Street	February 8, 1960
Bing Crosby	Motion pictures	1611 Vine Street	February 8, 1960
Bing Crosby	Radio	6769 Hollywood Boulevard	February 8, 1960
Bing Crosby	Recording	6751 Hollywood Boulevard	February 8, 1960
Bob Crosby	Television	6252 Hollywood Boulevard	February 8, 1960
Bob Crosby	Radio	6313 Hollywood Boulevard	February 8, 1960
Norm Crosby	Television	6560 Hollywood Boulevard	February 24, 1982
Crosby, Stills & Nash	Recording	6666 Hollywood Boulevard	June 21, 1978
Milton Cross	Radio	1623 Vine Street	February 8, 1960
Scatman Crothers	Motion pictures	6712 Hollywood Boulevard	April 8, 1981
Andrae Crouch	Recording	6520 Hollywood Boulevard	June 4, 2004
Russell Crowe	Motion pictures	6801 Hollywood Boulevard	April 12, 2010
Tom Cruise	Motion pictures	6912 Hollywood Boulevard	October 16, 1986
Frank Crumit	Radio	1601 Vine Street	February 8, 1960
Celia Cruz	Recording	6240 Hollywood Boulevard	September 17, 1987
Penelope Cruz	Motion pictures	6834 Hollywood Boulevard	April 1, 2011
James Cruze	Motion pictures	6922 Hollywood Boulevard	February 8, 1960
Jon Cryer	Television	6922 Hollywood Boulevard	September 19, 2011
Billy Crystal	Motion pictures	6925 Hollywood Boulevard	June 4, 1991
Xavier Cugat	Television	1500 Vine Street	February 8, 1960
Xavier Cugat	Recording	1601 Vine Street	February 8, 1960
George Cukor	Motion pictures	6378 Hollywood Boulevard	February 8, 1960
Macaulay Culkin	Motion pictures	6353 Hollywood Boulevard	December 1, 2023
Benedict Cumberbatch	Motion pictures	6918 Hollywood Boulevard	February 28, 2022
Alan Cumming	Live performance	6320 Hollywood Boulevard	January 8, 2026
Constance; Cummings	Motion pictures	6201 Hollywood Boulevard	February 8, 1960
Irving Cummings	Motion pictures	6816 Hollywood Boulevard	February 8, 1960
Robert Cummings	Motion pictures	6816 Hollywood Boulevard	February 8, 1960
Robert Cummings	Television	1718 Vine Street	February 8, 1960
Bill Cunningham [host of Meet the Boss]	Radio	6315 Hollywood Boulevard	February 8, 1960
Kaley Cuoco	Television	6621 Hollywood Boulevard	October 29, 2014
Mike Curb	Recording	1750 Vine Street	June 29, 2007
Alan Curtis	Motion pictures	7021 Hollywood Boulevard	February 8, 1960
Jamie Lee Curtis	Motion pictures	6600 Hollywood Boulevard	September 3, 1998
Tony Curtis	Motion pictures	6817 Hollywood Boulevard	February 8, 1960
Michael Curtiz	Motion pictures	6640 Hollywood Boulevard	February 8, 1960
John Cusack	Motion pictures	6644 Hollywood Boulevard	April 24, 2012
Cypress Hill	Recording	6201 Hollywood Boulevard	April 18, 2019
Miley Cyrus	Recording	7011 Hollywood Boulevard	May 22, 2026

== D ==
Name	Category	Address	Date
Paulinho da Costa	Recording	1709 Vine Street	May 13, 2026
Willem Dafoe	Motion pictures	6284 Hollywood Boulevard	January 8, 2024
Arlene Dahl	Motion pictures	1624 Vine Street	February 8, 1960
Cass Daley	Television	6301 Hollywood Boulevard	February 8, 1960
Cass Daley	Radio	6710 Hollywood Boulevard	February 8, 1960
Dorothy Dalton	Motion pictures	1560 Vine Street	February 8, 1960
John Daly	Television	1765 Vine Street	February 8, 1960
Tyne Daly	Television	7065 Hollywood Boulevard	March 29, 1995
Matt Damon	Motion pictures	6801 Hollywood Boulevard	July 25, 2007
Vic Damone	Recording	1731 Vine Street	February 8, 1960
Viola Dana	Motion pictures	6541 Hollywood Boulevard	February 8, 1960
Dorothy Dandridge	Motion pictures	6719 Hollywood Boulevard	January 18, 1983
Karl Dane	Motion pictures	6140 Hollywood Boulevard	February 8, 1960
Claire Danes	Television	6541 Hollywood Boulevard	September 24, 2015
Rodney Dangerfield	Live performance	6366 Hollywood Boulevard	March 27, 2002
Bebe Daniels	Motion pictures	1716 Vine Street	February 8, 1960
Billy Daniels	Recording	6819 Hollywood Boulevard	May 18, 1977
Greg Daniels	Television	6357 Hollywood Boulevard	September 10, 2026
Lee Daniels	Television	6533 Hollywood Boulevard	December 2, 2016
Ted Danson	Television	7021 Hollywood Boulevard	November 10, 1999
Tony Danza	Television	7000 Hollywood Boulevard	November 21, 1988
Bobby Darin	Recording	1735 Vine Street	May 26, 1982
Linda Darnell	Motion pictures	1631 Vine Street	February 8, 1960
Jane Darwell	Motion pictures	6735 Hollywood Boulevard	February 8, 1960
Delmer Daves	Motion pictures	1634 Vine Street	February 8, 1960
Hal David	Recording	6752 Hollywood Boulevard	October 14, 2011
Keith David	Motion pictures	6225 Hollywood Boulevard	June 4, 2026
Marion Davies	Motion pictures	6326 Hollywood Boulevard	February 8, 1960
Ann B Davis	Television	7048 Hollywood Boulevard	February 8, 1960
Bette Davis	Motion pictures	6225 Hollywood Boulevard	February 8, 1960
Bette Davis	Television	6335 Hollywood Boulevard	February 8, 1960
Clive Davis	Recording	1501 Vine Street	January 28, 1997
Gail Davis	Television	6385 Hollywood Boulevard	February 8, 1960
Jim Davis	Television	6290 Hollywood Boulevard	February 8, 1960
Joan Davis	Motion pictures	1521 Vine Street	February 8, 1960
Joan Davis	Radio	1716 Vine Street	February 8, 1960
Mac Davis	Recording	7080 Hollywood Boulevard	September 10, 1998
Miles Davis	Recording	7060 Hollywood Boulevard	February 19, 1998
Sammy Davis Jr	Recording	6254 Hollywood Boulevard	February 8, 1960
Viola Davis	Motion pictures	7013 Hollywood Boulevard	January 5, 2017
Dennis Day	Radio	7048 Hollywood Boulevard	February 8, 1960
Dennis Day	Television	6646 Hollywood Boulevard	February 8, 1960
Doris Day	Recording	6278 Hollywood Boulevard	February 8, 1960
Doris Day	Motion pictures	6735 Hollywood Boulevard	February 8, 1960
Laraine Day	Motion pictures	6676 Hollywood Boulevard	February 8, 1960
The Dead End Kids	Motion pictures	7080 Hollywood Boulevard	February 1, 1994
James Dean	Motion pictures	1719 Vine Street	February 8, 1960
Dear Abby	Radio	7000 Hollywood Boulevard	February 8, 1960
Rosemary De Camp	Television	1640 Vine Street	February 8, 1960
Yvonne DeCarlo	Motion pictures	6124 Hollywood Boulevard	February 8, 1960
Yvonne DeCarlo	Television	6715 Hollywood Boulevard	February 8, 1960
Frances Dee	Motion pictures	7080 Hollywood Boulevard	February 1, 1994
Rick Dees	Radio	1560 N. Vine Street	September 17, 1984
Don De Fore	Television	6804 Hollywood Boulevard	February 8, 1960
Lee De Forest	Motion pictures	1752 Vine Street	February 8, 1960
Ellen DeGeneres	Television	6270 Hollywood Boulevard	September 4, 2012
Carter De Haven	Motion pictures	1742 Vine Street	February 8, 1960
Gloria DeHaven	Motion pictures	6933 Hollywood Boulevard	February 8, 1960
Olivia de Havilland	Motion pictures	6762 Hollywood Boulevard	February 8, 1960
Albert Dekker	Television	6620 Hollywood Boulevard	February 8, 1960
Marguerite De La Motte	Motion pictures	6902 Hollywood Boulevard	February 8, 1960
Vaughn De Leath	Radio	6634 Hollywood Boulevard	February 8, 1960
Raul De Molina	Television	7076 Hollywood Boulevard	February 27, 2025
Def Leppard	Recording	1750 N. Vine Street	October 9, 2025
Dolores del Rio	Motion pictures	1630 Vine Street	February 8, 1960
Roy Del Ruth	Motion pictures	6150 Hollywood Boulevard	February 8, 1960
Guillermo del Toro	Motion pictures	6918 Hollywood Boulevard	August 6, 2019
Dom DeLuise	Motion pictures	1765 Vine Street	May 6, 1985
William Demarest	Motion pictures	6667 Hollywood Boulevard	August 8, 1979
Cecil B. De Mille	Motion pictures	1725 Vine Street	February 8, 1960
Cecil B. De Mille	Radio	6240 Hollywood Boulevard	February 8, 1960
William DeMille	Motion pictures	6100 Hollywood Boulevard	February 8, 1960
Richard Denning	Television	6932 Hollywood Boulevard	February 8, 1960
Reginald Denny	Motion pictures	6657 Hollywood Boulevard	February 8, 1960
John Denver	Recording	7065 Hollywood Boulevard	October 24, 2014
Johnny Depp	Motion pictures	7018 Hollywood Boulevard	November 16, 1999
Eugenio Derbez	Motion pictures	7013 Hollywood Boulevard	March 10, 2016
John Derek	Television	6531 Hollywood Boulevard	February 8, 1960
Bruce Dern	Motion pictures	6270 Hollywood Boulevard	November 1, 2010
Laura Dern	Motion pictures	6270 Hollywood Boulevard	November 3, 2010
Destiny's Child	Recording	6801 Hollywood Boulevard	March 28, 2006
Buddy DeSylva	Recording	1750 Vine Street	June 4, 1992
Andy Devine	Radio	6258 Hollywood Boulevard	February 8, 1960
Andy Devine	Television	6366 Hollywood Boulevard	February 8, 1960
Danny DeVito	Television	6906 Hollywood Boulevard	August 18, 2011

Name	Category	Address	Date
Elliott Dexter	Motion pictures	1751 Vine Street	February 8, 1960
Vin Di Bona	Television	1559 Vine Street	August 23, 2007
Neil Diamond	Recording	1750 Vine Street	August 10, 2012
Cameron Diaz	Motion pictures	6712 Hollywood Boulevard	June 22, 2009
Angie Dickinson	Television	7000 Hollywood Boulevard	September 10, 1987
Vin Diesel	Motion pictures	7000 Hollywood Boulevard	August 26, 2013
William Dieterle	Motion pictures	6901 Hollywood Boulevard	February 8, 1960
Marlene Dietrich	Motion pictures	6400 Hollywood Boulevard	February 8, 1960
Phyllis Diller	Television	7001 Hollywood Boulevard	January 15, 1975
Celine Dion	Recording	6801 Hollywood Boulevard	January 6, 2004
Roy O. Disney	Motion pictures	6833 Hollywood Boulevard	July 24, 1998
Walt Disney	Motion pictures	7021 Hollywood Boulevard	February 8, 1960
Walt Disney	Television	6747 Hollywood Boulevard	February 8, 1960
Disneyland	Special	6834 Hollywood Boulevard	July 14, 2005
Richard Dix	Motion pictures	1608 Vine Street	February 8, 1960
DJ Khaled	Recording	6212 Hollywood Boulevard	April 11, 2022
Edward Dmytryk	Motion pictures	6241 Hollywood Boulevard	February 8, 1960
Jimmie Dodd	Television	1600 Vine Street	February 8, 1960
Snoop Dogg	Recording	6840 Hollywood Boulevard	November 19, 2018
Ray Dolby	Motion pictures	6801 Hollywood Boulevard	January 22, 2015
Placido Domingo	Live performance	7000 Hollywood Boulevard	September 2, 1993
Fats Domino	Recording	6616 Hollywood Boulevard	February 8, 1960
Donald Duck	Motion pictures	6840 Hollywood Boulevard	August 9, 2004
Peter Donald	Television	6661 Hollywood Boulevard	February 8, 1960
Robert Donat	Motion pictures	6420 Hollywood Boulevard	February 8, 1960
Brian Donlevy	Television	1551 Vine Street	February 8, 1960
Lauren Shuler Donner	Motion pictures	6712 Hollywood Boulevard	October 16, 2008
Richard Donner	Motion pictures	6712 Hollywood Boulevard	October 16, 2008
James Doohan	Television	7021 Hollywood Boulevard	August 31, 2004
The Doors	Recording	6901 Hollywood Boulevard	February 28, 2007
Marie Doro	Motion pictures	1725 Vine Street	February 8, 1960
Jimmy Dorsey	Recording	6505 Hollywood Boulevard	February 8, 1960
Tommy Dorsey	Recording	6675 Hollywood Boulevard	February 8, 1960
Jack Douglas	Television	6740 Hollywood Boulevard	February 8, 1960
Kirk Douglas	Motion pictures	6263 Hollywood Boulevard	February 8, 1960
Melvyn Douglas	Motion pictures	6423 Hollywood Boulevard	February 8, 1960
Melvyn Douglas	Television	6601 Hollywood Boulevard	February 8, 1960
Michael Douglas	Motion pictures	6259 Hollywood Boulevard	November 6, 2018
Mike Douglas	Television	7001 Hollywood Boulevard	February 4, 1976
Paul Douglas	Motion pictures	1648 Hollywood Boulevard	February 8, 1960
Paul Douglas	Television	6821 Hollywood Boulevard	February 8, 1960
Billie Dove	Motion pictures	6351 Hollywood Boulevard	February 8, 1960
Morton Downey	Radio	1680 Vine Street	February 8, 1960
Roma Downey	Television	6664 Hollywood Boulevard	August 11, 2016
Cathy Downs	Television	6646 Hollywood Boulevard	February 8, 1960
Holland Dozier; Holland	Recording	7070 Hollywood Boulevard	February 13, 2015
Carmen Dragon	Radio	6104 Hollywood Boulevard	September 7, 1989
Jessica Dragonette	Radio	1709 Vine Street	February 8, 1960
Frances Drake	Motion pictures	6821 Hollywood Boulevard	February 8, 1960
Dr. Dre	Recording	6840 Hollywood Boulevard	March 19, 2024
Fran Drescher	Television	6623 Hollywood Boulevard	September 30, 2025
Louise Dresser	Motion pictures	6538 Hollywood Boulevard	February 8, 1960
Marie Dressler	Motion pictures	1731 Vine Street	February 8, 1960
Ellen Drew	Motion pictures	6901 Hollywood Boulevard	February 8, 1960
Mr. and Mrs. Sidney Drew	Motion pictures	6901 Hollywood Boulevard	February 8, 1960
Richard Dreyfuss	Motion pictures	7021 Hollywood Boulevard	October 10, 1996
Bobby Driscoll	Motion pictures	1560 Vine Street	February 8, 1960
Joanne Dru	Television	1708 Vine Street	February 8, 1960
David Duchovny	Television	6508 Hollywood Boulevard	January 25, 2016
Gustavo Dudamel	Live performance	6752 Hollywood Boulevard	January 22, 2019
Howard Duff	Television	1623 Vine Street	February 8, 1960
Olympia Dukakis	Live performance	6298 Hollywood Boulevard	May 13, 2013
Bill Duke	Motion pictures	6201 Hollywood Boulevard	February 26, 2026
Patty Duke	Motion pictures	7000 Hollywood Boulevard	August 17, 2004
Faye Dunaway	Motion pictures	7021 Hollywood Boulevard	October 2, 1996
Jeff Dunham	Live performance	6201 Hollywood Boulevard	September 21, 2017
James Dunn	Motion pictures	6555 Hollywood Boulevard	February 8, 1960
James Dunn	Television	7010 Hollywood Boulevard	February 8, 1960
Irene Dunne	Motion pictures	6440 Hollywood Boulevard	February 8, 1960
Philip Dunne	Motion pictures	6725 Hollywood Boulevard	October 23, 1987
Mildred Dunnock	Motion pictures	6613 Hollywood Boulevard	February 8, 1960
Jerry Dunphy	Television	6669 Hollywood Boulevard	May 9, 1984
Kirsten Dunst	Motion pictures	7076 Hollywood Boulevard	August 29, 2019
Duran Duran	Recording	1770 Vine Street	August 23, 1993
Elvis Duran	Radio	1717 Vine Street	March 2, 2017
Jimmy Durante	Motion pictures	1600 Vine Street	February 8, 1960
Jimmy Durante	Radio	1648 Vine Street	February 8, 1960
Deanna Durbin	Motion pictures	1724 Vine Street	February 8, 1960
Charles Durning	Motion pictures	6504 Hollywood Boulevard	July 31, 2008
Dan Duryea	Television	6145 Hollywood Boulevard	February 8, 1960
Robert Duvall	Motion pictures	6801 Hollywood Boulevard	September 18, 2003
Ann Dvorak	Motion pictures	6321 Hollywood Boulevard	February 8, 1960
Allan Dwan	Motion pictures	6263 Hollywood Boulevard	February 8, 1960

== E ==
Name	Category	Address	Date
Sheila E.	Recording	6752 Hollywood Boulevard	July 12, 2023
Earth Wind & Fire	Recording	7080 Hollywood Boulevard	September 14, 1995
George Eastman	Motion pictures	1709 Vine Street	February 8, 1960
George Eastman	Motion pictures	6800 Hollywood Boulevard	February 8, 1960
Roger Ebert	Television	6834 Hollywood Boulevard	June 23, 2005
Buddy Ebsen	Motion pictures	1765 Vine Street	February 8, 1960
Billy Eckstine	Recording	6638 Hollywood Boulevard	February 8, 1960
Nelson Eddy	Motion pictures	6311 Hollywood Boulevard	February 8, 1960
Nelson Eddy	Radio	6512 Hollywood Boulevard	February 8, 1960
Nelson Eddy	Recording	1639 Vine Street	February 8, 1960
Barbara Eden	Television	7003 Hollywood Boulevard	November 17, 1988
Robert Edeson	Motion pictures	1628 Vine Street	February 8, 1960
Thomas A Edison	Motion pictures	6700 Hollywood Boulevard	February 8, 1960
Kenny "Babyface"; Edmonds	Recording	6270 Hollywood Boulevard	November 10, 2013
Blake Edwards	Motion pictures	6908 Hollywood Boulevard	April 3, 1991
Ralph Edwards	Radio	6116 Hollywood Boulevard	February 8, 1960
Ralph Edwards	Television	6262 Hollywood Boulevard	February 8, 1960
Steve Edwards	Television	6150 Hollywood Boulevard	May 14, 2004
Zac Efron	Motion pictures	6426 Hollywood Boulevard	December 11, 2023
Ken Ehrlich	Television	1750 Vine Street	January 28, 2015
Michael D. Eisner	Motion pictures	6834 Hollywood Boulevard	April 25, 2008
Larry Elder	Radio	6270 Hollywood Boulevard	February 27, 2015
Duke Ellington	Recording	6535 Hollywood Boulevard	February 8, 1960
"Mama" Cass Elliot	Recording	7065 Hollywood Boulevard	October 3, 2022

Name	Category	Address	Date
Missy Elliott	Recording	6212 Hollywood Boulevard	November 8, 2021
Mischa Elman	Recording	1560 Vine Street	February 8, 1960
Faye Emerson	Motion pictures	6529 Hollywood Boulevard	February 8, 1960
Faye Emerson	Television	6689 Hollywood Boulevard	February 8, 1960
Dick Enberg	Television	6752 Hollywood Boulevard	February 24, 1998
Robert Englund	Motion pictures	6644 Hollywood Boulevard	October 31, 2025
John Ericson	Television	1523 Vine Street	February 8, 1960
Leon Errol	Motion pictures	6801 Hollywood Boulevard	February 8, 1960
Stu Erwin	Television	6270 Hollywood Boulevard	February 8, 1960
Giancarlo Esposito	Television	6351 Hollywood Boulevard	April 29, 2014
Emilio Estefan	Recording	7021 Hollywood Boulevard	June 9, 2005
Gloria Estefan	Recording	7021 Hollywood Boulevard	February 3, 1983
Lili Estefan	Television	7076 Hollywood Boulevard	February 27, 2025
Erik Estrada	Television	7021 Hollywood Boulevard	April 19, 2007
Melissa Etheridge	Recording	6901 Hollywood Boulevard	September 27, 2011
Ruth Etting	Motion pictures	6563 Hollywood Boulevard	February 8, 1960
Bob Eubanks	Radio	6712 Hollywood Boulevard	December 29, 2000
Livingston & Evans	Recording	7083 Hollywood Boulevard	January 12, 1995
Dale Evans	Radio	6638 Hollywood Boulevard	February 8, 1960
Dale Evans	Television	1737 Vine Street	February 8, 1960
Linda Evans	Television	6834 Hollywood Boulevard	August 20, 1987
Madge Evans	Motion pictures	1752 Vine Street	February 8, 1960
Robert Evans	Motion pictures	6925 Hollywood Boulevard	May 23, 2002
Chad Everett	Television	6922 Hollywood Boulevard	November 13, 1986
The Everly Brothers	Recording	7000 Hollywood Boulevard	October 2, 1986

== F ==
Name	Category	Address	Date
Fabian	Live performance	7065 Hollywood Boulevard	January 8, 2002
Nanette Fabray	Television	6300 Hollywood Boulevard	February 8, 1960
Max Factor	Motion pictures	6922 Hollywood Boulevard	February 18, 1981
Clifton Fadiman	Radio	6284 Hollywood Boulevard	February 8, 1960
Douglas; Fairbanks	Motion pictures	7022 Hollywood Boulevard	February 8, 1960
Douglas; Fairbanks Jr.	Motion pictures	6318 Hollywood Boulevard	February 8, 1960
Douglas; Fairbanks Jr.	Radio	6710 Hollywood Boulevard	February 8, 1960
Douglas; Fairbanks Jr.	Television	6661 Hollywood Boulevard	February 8, 1960
Jerry Fairbanks	Motion pictures	6384 Hollywood Boulevard	February 8, 1960
Percy Faith	Recording	1501 Vine Street	February 8, 1960
Peter Falk	Television	6654 Hollywood Boulevard	July 25, 2013
Jinx Falkenburg	Television	1500 Vine Street	February 8, 1960
Chris Farley	Motion pictures	6366 Hollywood Boulevard	August 26, 2005
Richard Farnsworth	Motion pictures	1560 Vine Street	August 17, 1992
Dustin Farnum	Motion pictures	6635 Hollywood Boulevard	February 8, 1960
William Farnum	Motion pictures	6322 Hollywood Boulevard	February 8, 1960
Jamie Farr	Television	1547 Vine Street	April 10, 1985
Geraldine Farrar	Motion pictures	1620 Vine Street	February 8, 1960
Geraldine Farrar	Recording	1709 Vine Street	February 8, 1960
Charles Farrell	Motion pictures	7021 Hollywood Boulevard	February 8, 1960
Charles Farrell	Television	1617 Vine Street	February 8, 1960
Glenda Farrell	Motion pictures	6524 Hollywood Boulevard	February 8, 1960
John Farrow	Motion pictures	6300 Hollywood Boulevard	February 8, 1960
William Faversham	Motion pictures	1724 Vine Street	February 8, 1960
Jon Favreau	Television	6840 Hollywood Boulevard	February 13, 2023
Farrah Fawcett	Television	7057 Hollywood Boulevard	February 23, 1995
Frank Fay	Motion pictures	6282 Hollywood Boulevard	February 8, 1960
Frank Fay	Radio	1752 Vine Street	February 8, 1960
Alice Faye	Motion pictures	6930 Hollywood Boulevard	February 8, 1960
Julia Faye	Motion pictures	6501 Hollywood Boulevard	February 8, 1960
Frank Faylen	Television	6201 Hollywood Boulevard	February 8, 1960
Louise Fazenda	Motion pictures	6801 Hollywood Boulevard	August 15, 1958
Don Fedderson	Television	1735 Vine Street	November 14, 1974
Kevin Feige	Motion pictures	6840 Hollywood Boulevard	July 25, 2024
Jose Feliciano	Recording	6541 Hollywood Boulevard	December 1, 1987
Verna Felton	Television	1717 Vine Street	February 8, 1960
Freddy Fender	Recording	7060 Hollywood Boulevard	February 4, 1999
George Fenneman	Television	1500 Vine Street	October 7, 1981
Helen Ferguson	Motion pictures	6153 Hollywood Boulevard	February 8, 1960
Alejandro Fernandez	Recording	6160 Hollywood Boulevard	December 2, 2005
Vicente Fernandez	Recording	6160 Hollywood Boulevard	November 11, 1998
Will Ferrell	Motion pictures	6767 Hollywood Boulevard	March 24, 2015
Jose Ferrer	Motion pictures	6541 Hollywood Boulevard	February 8, 1960
Mel Ferrer	Motion pictures	6268 Hollywood Boulevard	February 8, 1960
Stepin Fetchit	Motion pictures	1751 Vine Street	February 8, 1960
Fibber McGee & Molly	Radio	1500 Vine Street	December 21, 1983
Jimmie Fidler	Radio	6128 Hollywood Boulevard	February 8, 1960
Arthur Fiedler	Recording	1626 Vine Street	February 8, 1960
Sally Field	Motion pictures	6767 Hollywood Boulevard	May 5, 2014
Virginia Field	Television	1751 Vine Street	February 8, 1960
Gracie Fields	Radio	6125 Hollywood Boulevard	February 8, 1960
W. C. Fields	Motion pictures	7004 Hollywood Boulevard	February 8, 1960
W. C. Fields	Radio	6316 Hollywood Boulevard	February 8, 1960
Guy Fieri	Television	6201 Hollywood Boulevard	May 22, 2019
Harvey Fierstein	Live performance	6243 Hollywood Boulevard	April 11, 2016
The Original 5th Dimension	Recording	7000 Hollywood Boulevard	August 9, 1991
Flora Finch	Motion pictures	6673 Hollywood Boulevard	February 8, 1960
Colin Firth	Motion pictures	6714 Hollywood Boulevard	January 13, 2011
Carrie Fisher	Motion pictures	6840 Hollywood Boulevard	May 4, 2023
Eddie Fisher	Recording	6241 Hollywood Boulevard	February 8, 1960
Eddie Fisher	Television	1724 Vine Street	February 8, 1960
George Fisher	Radio	7072 Hollywood Boulevard	February 1, 1994
Hal Fishman	Television	1560 Vine Street	April 8, 1992
Barry Fitzgerald	Motion pictures	6252 Hollywood Boulevard	February 8, 1960
Barry Fitzgerald	Television	7001 Hollywood Boulevard	February 8, 1960
Ella Fitzgerald	Recording	6738 Hollywood Boulevard	February 8, 1960
Geraldine Fitzgerald	Motion pictures	6353 Hollywood Boulevard	February 8, 1960
George Fitzmaurice	Motion pictures	6601 Hollywood Boulevard	February 8, 1960
James A. FitzPatrick	Motion pictures	1611 Vine Street	February 8, 1960

Name	Category	Address	Date
Kirsten Flagstad	Recording	6777 Hollywood Boulevard	February 8, 1960
Bobby Flay	Television	6141 Hollywood Boulevard	June 2, 2015
Fleetwood Mac	Recording	6608 Hollywood Boulevard	October 10, 1979
Rhonda Fleming	Motion pictures	6660 Hollywood Boulevard	February 8, 1960
Victor Fleming	Motion pictures	1719 Vine Street	February 8, 1960
Errol Flynn	Motion pictures	6654 Hollywood Boulevard	February 8, 1960
Errol Flynn	Television	7008 Hollywood Boulevard	February 8, 1960
Nina Foch	Motion pictures	6322 Hollywood Boulevard	February 8, 1960
Nina Foch	Television	7021 Hollywood Boulevard	February 8, 1960
John Fogerty	Recording	7000 Hollywood Boulevard	October 1, 1998
Red Foley	Recording	6225 Hollywood Boulevard	February 8, 1960
Red Foley	Television	6300 Hollywood Boulevard	February 8, 1960
Henry Fonda	Motion pictures	1601 Vine Street	February 8, 1960
Peter Fonda	Motion pictures	7018 Hollywood Boulevard	October 22, 2003
Joan Fontaine	Motion pictures	1645 Vine Street	February 8, 1960
Dick Foran	Television	1600 Vine Street	February 8, 1960
June Foray	Television	7080 Hollywood Boulevard	July 7, 2000
Scott Forbes	Television	1650 Vine Street	February 8, 1960
Glenn Ford	Motion pictures	6933 Hollywood Boulevard	February 8, 1960
Harrison Ford [silent film actor]	Motion pictures	6665 Hollywood Boulevard	February 8, 1960
Harrison Ford	Motion pictures	6801 Hollywood Boulevard	May 30, 2003
John Ford	Motion pictures	1640 Vine Street	February 8, 1960
Les Paul & Mary Ford	Recording	1541 Vine Street	February 8, 1960
Tennessee; Ernie Ford	Radio	1600 Vine Street	February 8, 1960
Tennessee; Ernie Ford	Recording	6922 Hollywood Boulevard	February 8, 1960
Tennessee; Ernie Ford	Television	6311 Hollywood Boulevard	February 8, 1960
John Forsythe	Television	6549 Hollywood Boulevard	February 8, 1960
David Foster	Recording	1750 Vine Street	May 31, 2013
Jodie Foster	Motion pictures	6927 Hollywood Boulevard	May 4, 2016
Preston Foster	Television	6801 Hollywood Boulevard	August 15, 1958
Frankie Valli & Four Seasons	Recording	6150 Hollywood Boulevard	May 3, 2024
The Four Step; Brothers	Live performance	7000 Hollywood Boulevard	July 14, 1988
The Four Tops	Recording	7060 Hollywood Boulevard	April 23, 1997
Charles Fox	Recording	6752 Hollywood Boulevard	April 5, 2024
Michael J Fox	Motion pictures	7021 Hollywood Boulevard	December 16, 2002
William Fox	Motion pictures	6541 Hollywood Boulevard	February 8, 1960
Jamie Foxx	Motion pictures	6801 Hollywood Boulevard	September 14, 2007
Eddie Foy	Motion pictures	1725 Vine Street	February 8, 1960
Peter Frampton	Recording	6819 Hollywood Boulevard	August 24, 1979
Zino; Francescatti	Recording	6704 Hollywood Boulevard	February 8, 1960
Anne Francis	Television	1611 Vine Street	February 8, 1960
Arlene Francis	Radio	6432 Hollywood Boulevard	February 8, 1960
Arlene Francis	Television	1734 Vine Street	February 8, 1960
Kay Francis	Motion pictures	6766 Hollywood Boulevard	February 8, 1960
Don Francisco	Television	7018 Hollywood Boulevard	June 8, 2001
James Franco	Motion pictures	6838 Hollywood Boulevard	March 7, 2013
Musso & Frank	Special	6667 Hollywood Boulevard	September 27, 2019
Aretha Franklin	Recording	6920 Hollywood Boulevard	August 29, 1979
Sidney Franklin	Motion pictures	6566 Hollywood Boulevard	February 8, 1960
Dennis Franz	Television	7021 Hollywood Boulevard	February 19, 1999
William Frawley	Motion pictures	6322 Hollywood Boulevard	February 8, 1960
Stan Freberg	Recording	6145 Hollywood Boulevard	February 8, 1960
Pauline; Frederick	Motion pictures	7000 Hollywood Boulevard	February 8, 1960
Alan Freed	Radio	6381 Hollywood Boulevard	December 10, 1991
Morgan Freeman	Motion pictures	7021 Hollywood Boulevard	March 18, 2003
Y. Frank Freeman	Motion pictures	6821 Hollywood Boulevard	February 8, 1960
Friz Freleng	Motion pictures	7000 Hollywood Boulevard	August 20, 1992
William Friedkin	Motion pictures	6925 Hollywood Boulevard	August 14, 1997
Harry Friedman	Television	6200 Hollywood Boulevard	November 3, 2019
Charles Fries	Television	6819 Hollywood Boulevard	June 27, 1986
Lefty Frizzell	Recording	6927 Hollywood Boulevard	February 8, 1960
Jane Froman	Radio	6321 Hollywood Boulevard	February 8, 1960
Jane Froman	Recording	6145 Hollywood Boulevard	February 8, 1960
Jane Froman	Television	1645 Vine Street	February 8, 1960
Robert Fuller	Television	6608 Hollywood Boulevard	April 16, 1975
Simon Fuller	Television	6268 Hollywood Boulevard	May 23, 2011
Annette Funicello	Motion pictures	6834 Hollywood Boulevard	September 14, 1993
The Funk Brothers	Recording	7065 Hollywood Boulevard	March 21, 2013
Betty Furness	Motion pictures	1533 Vine Street	February 8, 1960
Betty Furness	Television	6675 Hollywood Boulevard	February 8, 1960

== G ==
Name	Category	Address	Date
Kenny G	Recording	7021 Hollywood Boulevard	November 20, 1997
Clark Gable	Motion pictures	1608 Vine Street	February 8, 1960
Eva Gabor	Television	6614 Hollywood Boulevard	October 23, 1984
Zsa Zsa Gabor	Television	6915 Hollywood Boulevard	February 8, 1960
Ana Gabriel	Recording	6623 Hollywood Boulevard	November 3, 2021
Juan Gabriel	Recording	7060 Hollywood Boulevard	May 10, 2002
Gal Gadot	Motion pictures	6840 Hollywood Boulevard	March 18, 2025
Helen Gahagan	Motion pictures	1708 Vine Street	February 8, 1960
Amelita; Galli-Curci	Recording	6821 Hollywood Boulevard	February 8, 1960
Greta Garbo	Motion pictures	6901 Hollywood Boulevard	February 8, 1960
Andy Garcia	Motion pictures	7000 Hollywood Boulevard	September 19, 1995
Ava Gardner	Motion pictures	1560 Vine Street	February 8, 1960
Ed Gardner	Radio	6554 Hollywood Boulevard	February 8, 1960
Ed Gardner	Television	6676 Hollywood Boulevard	February 8, 1960
John Garfield	Motion pictures	7065 Hollywood Boulevard	February 8, 1960
Beverly Garland	Television	6801 Hollywood Boulevard	January 26, 1983
Judy Garland	Motion pictures	1715 Vine Street	February 8, 1960
Judy Garland	Recording	6764 Hollywood Boulevard	February 8, 1960
Erroll Garner	Recording	6363 Hollywood Boulevard	February 8, 1960
James Garner	Television	6927 Hollywood Boulevard	February 8, 1960
Jennifer Garner	Motion pictures	6920 Hollywood Boulevard	August 20, 2018
Peggy Ann Garner	Motion pictures	6604 Hollywood Boulevard	February 8, 1960
Tay Garnett	Motion pictures	6556 Hollywood Boulevard	February 8, 1960
Betty Garrett	Live performance	6706 Hollywood Boulevard	May 23, 2003
Dave Garroway	Radio	6355 Hollywood Boulevard	February 8, 1960
Dave Garroway	Television	6264 Hollywood Boulevard	February 8, 1960
Greer Garson	Motion pictures	1651 Vine Street	February 8, 1960
Lucho Gatica	Recording	7021 Hollywood Boulevard	January 25, 2008
Marvin Gaye	Recording	1500 Vine Street	September 27, 1990
Crystal Gayle	Recording	1515 Vine Street	October 2, 2009
Janet Gaynor	Motion pictures	6284 Hollywood Boulevard	February 8, 1960
Mitzi Gaynor	Motion pictures	6288 Hollywood Boulevard	February 8, 1960
Bill Geist	Television	6850 Hollywood Boulevard	April 15, 2011
David Gerber	Television	1637 Vine Street	January 11, 2006
George & Ira; Gershwin	Recording	7083 Hollywood Boulevard	June 4, 1998
Ricky Gervais	Television	1628 Vine Street	May 30, 2025
Giancarlo Giannini	Motion pictures	6361 Hollywood Boulevard	March 6, 2023
Floyd Gibbons	Radio	1631 Vine Street	February 8, 1960
Leeza Gibbons	Television	7021 Hollywood Boulevard	May 7, 1998
Georgia Gibbs	Recording	6404 Hollywood Boulevard	February 8, 1960
Marla Gibbs	Television	6840 Hollywood Boulevard	July 20, 2021
Hoot Gibson	Motion pictures	1765 Vine Street	February 8, 1960
Kathie Lee Gifford	Television	6834 Hollywood Boulevard	April 28, 2021
Beniamino Gigli	Recording	6901 Hollywood Boulevard	February 8, 1960
Billy Gilbert	Motion pictures	6263 Hollywood Boulevard	February 8, 1960
John Gilbert	Motion pictures	1755 Vine Street	February 8, 1960
Melissa Gilbert	Television	6429 Hollywood Boulevard	March 15, 1985
Paul Gilbert	Television	6340 Hollywood Boulevard	February 8, 1960
Vince Gill	Recording	6901 Hollywood Boulevard	September 6, 2012
Dizzy Gillespie	Recording	7057 Hollywood Boulevard	October 20, 1995
Mickey Gilley	Recording	6930 Hollywood Boulevard	October 18, 1984
Dorothy Gish	Motion pictures	6385 Hollywood Boulevard	February 8, 1960
Lillian Gish	Motion pictures	1720 Vine Street	February 8, 1960
Louise Glaum	Motion pictures	6834 Hollywood Boulevard	February 8, 1960
Jackie Gleason	Recording	6231 Hollywood Boulevard	February 8, 1960
Jackie Gleason	Television	6300 Hollywood Boulevard	February 8, 1960
James Gleason	Motion pictures	7038 Hollywood Boulevard	February 8, 1960
Sharon Gless	Television	7065 Hollywood Boulevard	March 29, 1995
George Gobel	Television	6850 Hollywood Boulevard	February 8, 1960
Paulette Goddard	Motion pictures	1652 Vine Street	February 8, 1960
Arthur Godfrey	Radio	6233 Hollywood Boulevard	February 8, 1960
Arthur Godfrey	Recording	6616 Hollywood Boulevard	February 8, 1960
Arthur Godfrey	Television	1559 Vine Street	February 8, 1960
Earl Godwin	Radio	6201 Hollywood Boulevard	February 8, 1960
Godzilla	Motion pictures	6925 Hollywood Boulevard	November 29, 2004
The Go-Go's	Recording	6652 Hollywood Boulevard	August 11, 2011

Name	Category	Address	Date
Ernest Gold	Recording	6434 Hollywood Boulevard	March 19, 1975
Leonard Goldberg	Television	6901 Hollywood Boulevard	December 9, 1986
Whoopi Goldberg	Motion pictures	6801 Hollywood Boulevard	July 20, 2001
Jeff Goldblum	Motion pictures	6656 Hollywood Boulevard	June 14, 2018
Leonard H. Goldenson	Television	6834 Hollywood Boulevard	August 24, 2006
Edwin F. Goldman	Radio	6410 Hollywood Boulevard	February 8, 1960
Jerry Goldsmith	Recording	6752 Hollywood Boulevard	May 9, 2017
Samuel Goldwyn	Motion pictures	1631 Vine Street	February 8, 1960
Pedro Gonzalez; Gonzalez	Motion pictures	1555 Vine Street	November 14, 2008
Cuba Gooding Jr.	Motion pictures	6834 Hollywood Boulevard	January 17, 2002
Al Goodman	Recording	6300 Hollywood Boulevard	February 8, 1960
Benny Goodman	Recording	6101 Hollywood Boulevard	February 8, 1960
John Goodman	Motion pictures	6767 Hollywood Boulevard	March 10, 2017
Mark Goodson	Television	6374 Hollywood Boulevard	June 23, 1982
Bill Goodwin	Radio	6810 Hollywood Boulevard	February 8, 1960
Gale Gordon	Radio	6340 Hollywood Boulevard	February 8, 1960
Berry Gordy	Recording	7000 Hollywood Boulevard	October 24, 1996
Mike Gore	Motion pictures	6315 Hollywood Boulevard	February 8, 1960
Steve Lawrence & Eydie Gorme	Recording	1541 Vine Street	February 8, 1960
Freeman Gosden; Amos	Radio	1777 Vine Street	December 31, 1969
Louis Gossett Jr.	Motion pictures	7000 Hollywood Boulevard	May 20, 1992
Jetta Goudal	Motion pictures	6333 Hollywood Boulevard	February 8, 1960
Morton Gould	Recording	6533 Hollywood Boulevard	February 8, 1960
Robert Goulet	Recording	6368 Hollywood Boulevard	June 11, 1975
Betty Grable	Motion pictures	6525 Hollywood Boulevard	February 8, 1960
Billy Graham	Radio	6901 Hollywood Boulevard	October 15, 1989
Lauren Graham	Television	6284 Hollywood Boulevard	October 3, 2025
Gloria Grahame	Motion pictures	6522 Hollywood Boulevard	February 8, 1960
Sir Lucian Grainge	Recording	1750 Vine Street	January 23, 2020
Kelsey Grammer	Television	7021 Hollywood Boulevard	May 22, 2001
Farley Granger	Television	1551 Vine Street	February 8, 1960
Amy Grant	Recording	6901 Hollywood Boulevard	September 19, 2006
Cary Grant	Motion pictures	1610 Vine Street	February 8, 1960
Johnny Grant	Special	6807 Hollywood Boulevard	June 26, 2012
Johnny Grant	Television	6915 Hollywood Boulevard	May 9, 1980
Bonita Granville	Motion pictures	6607 Hollywood Boulevard	February 8, 1960
Sid Grauman	Motion pictures	6379 Hollywood Boulevard	February 8, 1960
Peter Graves	Television	6667 Hollywood Boulevard	October 30, 2009
F. Gary Gray	Motion pictures	6426 Hollywood Boulevard	May 28, 2019
Gilda Gray	Motion pictures	6620 Hollywood Boulevard	February 8, 1960
Glen Gray	Recording	1709 Vine Street	February 8, 1960
Jim Gray	Television	6801 Hollywood Boulevard	March 3, 2005
Kathryn Grayson	Motion pictures	1600 Vine Street	February 8, 1960
Brian Grazer	Motion pictures	7000 Hollywood Boulevard	March 20, 1997
Alfred Green	Motion pictures	6529 Hollywood Boulevard	February 8, 1960
Green Day	Recording	6212 Hollywood Boulevard	May 1, 2025
John Green	Motion pictures	6925 Hollywood Boulevard	February 8, 1960
Mitzi Green	Motion pictures	6430 Hollywood Boulevard	February 8, 1960
Harold Greene	Television	6906 Hollywood Boulevard	July 15, 1999
Lorne Greene	Television	1559 Vine Street	February 12, 1985
Charlotte; Greenwood	Radio	1601 Vine Street	February 8, 1960
Jane Greer	Motion pictures	1634 Vine Street	February 8, 1960
Dick Gregory	Live performance	1650 Vine Street	February 2, 2015
Joel Grey	Live performance	6753 Hollywood Boulevard	October 10, 1985
Merv Griffin	Television	1541 Vine Street	October 15, 1974
Andy Griffith	Television	6418 Hollywood Boulevard	April 21, 1976
Corinne Griffith	Motion pictures	1560 Vine Street	February 8, 1960
David W. Griffith	Motion pictures	6535 Hollywood Boulevard	February 8, 1960
Raymond Griffith	Motion pictures	6124 Hollywood Boulevard	February 8, 1960
Josh Groban	Recording	6212 Hollywood Boulevard	May 6, 2026
Matt Groening	Television	7021 Hollywood Boulevard	February 14, 2012
Robert Guillaume	Television	6675 Hollywood Boulevard	November 28, 1984
Texas Guinan	Motion pictures	1765 Vine Street	February 8, 1960
Alec Guinness	Motion pictures	1559 Vine Street	February 8, 1960
Steve Guttenberg	Motion pictures	6411 Hollywood Boulevard	December 12, 2011
Edmund Gwenn	Motion pictures	1755 Vine Street	February 8, 1960

== H ==
Name	Category	Address	Date
Buddy Hackett	Live performance	6834 Hollywood Boulevard	March 31, 1998
Reed Hadley	Television	6553 Hollywood Boulevard	February 8, 1960
Sammy Hagar	Recording	6212 Hollywood Boulevard	April 30, 2024
Jean Hagen	Television	1560 Vine Street	February 8, 1960
Dan Haggerty	Television	7070 Hollywood Boulevard	February 1, 1994
Don Haggerty	Television	6140 Hollywood Boulevard	February 8, 1960
Larry Hagman	Television	1560 Vine Street	September 9, 1981
William Haines	Motion pictures	7012 Hollywood Boulevard	February 8, 1960
Jester Hairston	Television	6161 Hollywood Boulevard	February 12, 1992
Alan Hale	Motion pictures	6532 Hollywood Boulevard	February 8, 1960
Alan Hale Jr.	Television	6653 Hollywood Boulevard	February 8, 1960
Barbara Hale	Television	1628 Vine Street	February 8, 1960
Creighton Hale	Motion pictures	6915 Hollywood Boulevard	February 8, 1960
Monte Hale	Motion pictures	7000 Hollywood Boulevard	November 12, 2004
Bill Haley	Recording	6350 Hollywood Boulevard	February 8, 1960
Jack Haley	Radio	6435 Hollywood Boulevard	February 8, 1960
Arsenio Hall	Television	6776 Hollywood Boulevard	November 7, 1990
Conrad Hall	Motion pictures	7060 Hollywood Boulevard	May 1, 2003
Daryl Hall & John Oates	Recording	6752 Hollywood Boulevard	September 2, 2016
Deidre Hall	Television	6201 Hollywood Boulevard	May 19, 2016
Jon Hall	Motion pictures	1724 Vine Street	February 8, 1960
Jon Hall	Television	6933 Hollywood Boulevard	February 8, 1960
Monty Hall	Television	6801 Hollywood Boulevard	August 24, 1973
Stuart Hamblen	Recording	6841 Hollywood Boulevard	February 19, 1976
Rusty Hamer	Television	6323 Hollywood Boulevard	February 8, 1960
Mark Hamill	Motion pictures	6834 Hollywood Boulevard	March 8, 2018
George Hamilton	Motion pictures	7021 Hollywood Boulevard	August 12, 2009
Lloyd Hamilton	Motion pictures	6141 Hollywood Boulevard	February 8, 1960
Neil Hamilton	Motion pictures	6634 Hollywood Boulevard	February 8, 1960
Lionel Hampton	Recording	7000 Hollywood Boulevard	June 14, 1982
Herbie Hancock	Recording	7057 Hollywood Boulevard	September 8, 1994
Bill Handel	Radio	6640 Hollywood Boulevard	June 12, 2009
Tom Hanks	Motion pictures	7000 Hollywood Boulevard	July 1, 1992
Hanna Barbera	Motion pictures	6753 Hollywood Boulevard	February 19, 1976
Ann Harding	Motion pictures	6201 Hollywood Boulevard	February 8, 1960
Ann Harding	Television	6850 Hollywood Boulevard	February 8, 1960
Sir Cedric; Hardwicke	Motion pictures	6201 Hollywood Boulevard	February 8, 1960
Sir Cedric; Hardwicke	Television	6660 Hollywood Boulevard	February 8, 1960
Oliver Hardy	Motion pictures	1500 Vine Street	February 8, 1960
Mariska Hargitay	Television	6328 Hollywood Boulevard	November 8, 2013
Harlem Globetrotters	Television	6922 Hollywood Boulevard	January 19, 1982
Jean Harlow	Motion pictures	6910 Hollywood Boulevard	February 8, 1960
Mark Harmon	Television	6253 Hollywood Boulevard	October 1, 2012
Arlene Harris	Radio	6250 Hollywood Boulevard	February 8, 1960
Ed Harris	Motion pictures	6712 Hollywood Boulevard	March 13, 2015
Jack H. Harris	Motion pictures	6764 Hollywood Boulevard	February 4, 2014
Mildred Harris	Motion pictures	6307 Hollywood Boulevard	February 8, 1960
Neil Patrick Harris	Television	6243 Hollywood Boulevard	September 15, 2011
Phil Harris	Radio	6651 Hollywood Boulevard	February 8, 1960
Phil Harris	Recording	6508 Hollywood Boulevard	February 8, 1960
George Harrison	Recording	1750 Vine Street	April 14, 2009
Rex Harrison	Motion pictures	6904 Hollywood Boulevard	February 8, 1960
Rex Harrison	Television	6390 Hollywood Boulevard	February 8, 1960
Ray Harryhausen	Motion pictures	6840 Hollywood Boulevard	June 10, 2003
John Hart	Television	6432 Hollywood Boulevard	February 8, 1960
Kevin Hart	Live performance	7013 Hollywood Boulevard	October 10, 2016
Mary Hart	Television	7000 Hollywood Boulevard	May 12, 1989
William S. Hart	Motion pictures	6363 Hollywood Boulevard	February 8, 1960
Mariette Hartley	Television	7000 Hollywood Boulevard	June 11, 1987
Phil Hartman	Television	6600 Hollywood Boulevard	August 26, 2014
Steve Harvey	Radio	6270 Hollywood Boulevard	May 13, 2013
David Hasselhoff	Television	7018 Hollywood Boulevard	January 12, 1996
Signe Hasso	Motion pictures	7080 Hollywood Boulevard	February 1, 1994
Anne Hathaway	Motion pictures	6927 Hollywood Boulevard	May 9, 2019
Henry Hathaway	Motion pictures	1638 Vine Street	February 8, 1960
Raymond Hatton	Motion pictures	1708 Vine Street	February 8, 1960
June Haver	Motion pictures	1777 Vine Street	February 8, 1960
June Havoc	Motion pictures	6618 Hollywood Boulevard	February 8, 1960
June Havoc	Television	6413 Hollywood Boulevard	February 8, 1960
Bob Hawk	Television	6413 Hollywood Boulevard	February 8, 1960
Howard Hawks	Motion pictures	1708 Vine Street	February 8, 1960
Goldie Hawn	Motion pictures	6201 Hollywood Boulevard	May 4, 2017
Bill Hay	Radio	6826 Hollywood Boulevard	February 8, 1960
Sessue Hayakawa	Motion pictures	1645 Vine Street	February 8, 1960
Salma Hayek	Motion pictures	6901 Hollywood Boulevard	November 19, 2021
Gabby Hayes	Radio	6427 Hollywood Boulevard	February 8, 1960
Gabby Hayes	Television	1724 Vine Street	February 8, 1960
Helen Hayes	Motion pictures	6258 Hollywood Boulevard	February 8, 1960
Helen Hayes	Radio	6549 Hollywood Boulevard	February 8, 1960
Johnny Hayes	Radio	6769 Hollywood Boulevard	May 18, 2000
Richard Hayman	Recording	1765 Vine Street	February 8, 1960
Dick Haymes	Recording	1724 Vine Street	February 8, 1960
Dick Haymes	Radio	6116 Hollywood Boulevard	August 18, 1980
Dick Haynes	Radio	6841 Hollywood Boulevard	February 8, 1960
Will H. Hays	Motion pictures	6116 Hollywood Boulevard	February 8, 1960
Louis Hayward	Motion pictures	1500 Vine Street	February 8, 1960
Louis Hayward	Television	1680 Vine Street	February 8, 1960
Susan Hayward	Motion pictures	6251 Hollywood Boulevard	February 8, 1960
Rita Hayworth	Motion pictures	1645 Vine Street	February 8, 1960
Edith Head	Motion pictures	6504 Hollywood Boulevard	April 24, 1974
Jim Healy	Radio	6740 Hollywood Boulevard	November 7, 1991
Chick Hearn	Radio	6755 Hollywood Boulevard	September 24, 1986
Ann & Nancy Wilson; Heart	Recording	6752 Hollywood Boulevard	September 25, 2012
Patricia Heaton	Television	6533 Hollywood Boulevard	May 22, 2012
Eileen Heckart	Motion pictures	6140 Hollywood Boulevard	February 8, 1960
Tippi Hedren	Motion pictures	7060 Hollywood Boulevard	January 30, 2003
Van Heflin	Motion pictures	6311 Hollywood Boulevard	February 8, 1960
Van Heflin	Television	6125 Hollywood Boulevard	February 8, 1960
Hugh M Hefner	Television	7000 Hollywood Boulevard	April 9, 1980

Name	Category	Address	Date
Horace Heidt	Radio	1631 Vine Street	February 8, 1960
Horace Heidt	Television	6628 Hollywood Boulevard	February 8, 1960
Jascha Heifetz	Recording	6777 Hollywood Boulevard	February 8, 1960
Marg Helgenberger	Television	6667 Hollywood Boulevard	January 23, 2012
Chris Hemsworth	Motion pictures	6819 Hollywood Boulevard	May 23, 2024
Florence Henderson	Television	7070 Hollywood Boulevard	February 14, 1996
Jimi Hendrix	Recording	6627 Hollywood Boulevard	November 21, 1991
Sonja Henie	Motion pictures	6101 Hollywood Boulevard	February 8, 1960
Paul Henreid	Motion pictures	6366 Hollywood Boulevard	February 8, 1960
Paul Henreid	Television	1720 Vine Street	February 8, 1960
Jim Henson	Television	6631 Hollywood Boulevard	September 24, 1991
Taraji P. Henson	Motion pictures	6212 Hollywood Boulevard	January 28, 2019
Audrey Hepburn	Motion pictures	1652 Vine Street	February 8, 1960
Katharine Hepburn	Motion pictures	6284 Hollywood Boulevard	February 8, 1960
Hugh Herbert	Motion pictures	6251 Hollywood Boulevard	February 8, 1960
Jerry Herman	Live performance	7095 Hollywood Boulevard	February 1, 1994
Pee — Wee Herman	Motion pictures	6562 Hollywood Boulevard	July 20, 1988
Woody Herman	Recording	6805 Hollywood Boulevard	February 8, 1960
Orel Hershiser	Sports Entertainment	6755 Hollywood Boulevard	August 13, 2026
Jean Hersholt	Motion pictures	6501 Hollywood Boulevard	February 8, 1960
Jean Hersholt	Radio	6701 Hollywood Boulevard	February 8, 1960
Irene Hervey	Motion pictures	6336 Hollywood Boulevard	February 8, 1960
Charlton Heston	Motion pictures	1628 Vine Street	February 8, 1960
Eddie Heywood	Recording	1709 Vine Street	February 8, 1960
Al Hibbler	Recording	1650 Vine Street	February 8, 1960
George Hicks	Radio	6314 Hollywood Boulevard	February 8, 1960
Hildegarde	Radio	6141 Hollywood Boulevard	February 8, 1960
Jim Hill	Television	6801 Hollywood Boulevard	May 9, 2006
Cheryl Hines	Television	6621 Hollywood Boulevard	January 29, 2014
Alfred Hitchcock	Motion pictures	6506 Hollywood Boulevard	February 8, 1960
Alfred Hitchcock	Television	7013 Hollywood Boulevard	February 8, 1960
John Hodiak	Radio	6101 Hollywood Boulevard	February 8, 1960
Portland Hoffa	Radio	1640 Vine Street	February 8, 1960
William Holden	Motion pictures	1651 Vine Street	February 8, 1960
Billie Holiday	Recording	1540 N. Vine Street	April 7, 1986
Holland Dozier; Holland	Recording	7070 Hollywood Boulevard	February 13, 2015
Judy Holliday	Motion pictures	6901 Hollywood Boulevard	February 8, 1960
Earl Holliman	Television	6901 Hollywood Boulevard	July 20, 1977
Gordon; Hollingshead	Motion pictures	6200 Hollywood Boulevard	February 8, 1960
Buddy Holly	Recording	1750 Vine Street	September 7, 2011
The Hollywood; Reporter	Special	7016 Hollywood Boulevard	September 8, 2005
Celeste Holm	Motion pictures	1500 Vine Street	February 8, 1960
Celeste Holm	Television	6821 Hollywood Boulevard	February 8, 1960
Burton Holmes	Motion pictures	6600 Hollywood Boulevard	February 8, 1960
Phillips Holmes	Motion pictures	6908 Hollywood Boulevard	February 8, 1960
Taylor Holmes	Motion pictures	6821 Hollywood Boulevard	February 8, 1960
Jack Holt	Motion pictures	6313½ Hollywood Boulevard	February 8, 1960
James Hong	Motion pictures	6931 Hollywood Boulevard	May 10, 2022
John Lee Hooker	Recording	7083 Hollywood Boulevard	September 11, 1997
Bob Hope	Motion pictures	6541 Hollywood Boulevard	February 8, 1960
Bob Hope	Radio	6141 Hollywood Boulevard	February 8, 1960
Bob Hope	Live performance	Special Plaque; 7021 Hollywood Boulevard	May 13, 1993
Bob Hope	Television	6758 Hollywood Boulevard	February 8, 1960
Dolores Hope	Live performance	7021 Hollywood Boulevard	May 1, 1997
Anthony Hopkins	Motion pictures	6801 Hollywood Boulevard	September 24, 2003
Linda Hopkins	Live performance	6233 Hollywood Boulevard	October 6, 2005
Miriam Hopkins	Motion pictures	1709 Vine Street	February 8, 1960
Miriam Hopkins	Television	1716 Vine Street	February 8, 1960
Dennis Hopper	Motion pictures	6712 Hollywood Boulevard	March 26, 2010
Hedda Hopper	Motion pictures	6313 Hollywood Boulevard	February 8, 1960
Lena Horne	Motion pictures	6282 Hollywood Boulevard	February 8, 1960
Lena Horne	Recording	6250 Hollywood Boulevard	February 8, 1960
Vladimir Horowitz	Recording	1680 Vine Street	February 8, 1960
Edward; Everett Horton	Motion pictures	6427 Hollywood Boulevard	February 8, 1960
Houdini	Motion pictures	7001 Hollywood Boulevard	October 31, 1975
Eddy Howard	Recording	6724 Hollywood Boulevard	February 8, 1960
John Howard	Television	6515 Hollywood Boulevard	February 8, 1960
Leslie Howard	Motion pictures	6550 Hollywood Boulevard	February 8, 1960
Ron Howard	Television	6838 Hollywood Boulevard	August 19, 1981
Ron Howard	Motion pictures	6931 Hollywood Boulevard	December 10, 2015
Terrence Howard	Television	6200 Hollywood Boulevard	September 24, 2019
William K. Howard	Motion pictures	1500 Vine Street	February 8, 1960
Jennifer Hudson	Recording	6262 Hollywood Boulevard	November 13, 2013
Rochelle Hudson	Motion pictures	6200 Hollywood Boulevard	February 8, 1960
Rock Hudson	Motion pictures	6116 Hollywood Boulevard	February 8, 1960
Felicity Huffman	Television	7072 Hollywood Boulevard	March 7, 2012
Josephine Hull	Motion pictures	6502 Hollywood Boulevard	February 8, 1960
Warren Hull	Radio	6270 Hollywood Boulevard	February 8, 1960
Warren Hull	Television	6135 Hollywood Boulevard	February 8, 1960
Bruce; Humberstone	Motion pictures	1752 Vine Street	February 8, 1960
Engelbert; Humperdinck	Recording	7000 Hollywood Boulevard	October 23, 1989
Frazier Hunt	Radio	1708 Vine Street	February 8, 1960
Marsha Hunt	Television	6658 Hollywood Boulevard	February 8, 1960
Pee Wee Hunt	Recording	6838 Hollywood Boulevard	February 8, 1960
Holly Hunter	Motion pictures	7000 Hollywood Boulevard	April 30, 2008
Jeffrey Hunter	Television	6918 Hollywood Boulevard	February 8, 1960
Kim Hunter	Motion pictures	1617 Vine Street	February 8, 1960
Kim Hunter	Television	1715 Vine Street	February 8, 1960
Tab Hunter	Recording	6320 Hollywood Boulevard	February 8, 1960
Gale Anne Hurd	Motion pictures	6621 Hollywood Boulevard	October 3, 2012
Marlin Hurt	Radio	6514 Hollywood Boulevard	February 8, 1960
Ted Husing	Radio	6821 Hollywood Boulevard	February 8, 1960
Ferlin Husky	Recording	6675 Hollywood Boulevard	February 8, 1960
Ruth Hussey	Motion pictures	1551 Vine Street	February 8, 1960
Nipsey Hussle	Recording	6212 Hollywood Boulevard	August 15, 2022
Anjelica Huston	Motion pictures	6270 Hollywood Boulevard	January 22, 2010
John Huston	Motion pictures	1765 Vine Street	February 8, 1960
Walter Huston	Motion pictures	6624 Hollywood Boulevard	February 8, 1960
Betty Hutton	Motion pictures	6259 Hollywood Boulevard	February 8, 1960

== I ==
Name	Category	Address	Date
Ice Cube	Recording	6752 Hollywood Boulevard	June 12, 2017
Ice-T	Recording	7065 Hollywood Boulevard	February 17, 2023
Billy Idol	Recording	6201 Hollywood Boulevard	January 6, 2023
Gabriel Iglesias "Fluffy"	Live performance	7060 Hollywood Boulevard	March 3, 2026
Julio Iglesias	Recording	7000 Hollywood Boulevard	November 7, 1985
Thomas Ince	Motion pictures	6727 Hollywood Boulevard	February 8, 1960
Pedro Infante	Recording	7083 Hollywood Boulevard	February 1, 1994
Rex Ingram	Motion pictures	1651 Hollywood Boulevard	February 8, 1960
Intocable	Recording	7083 Hollywood Boulevard	July 16, 2026
Jill Ireland	Motion pictures	6751 Hollywood Boulevard	June 20, 1989
John Ireland	Television	7021 Hollywood Boulevard	February 8, 1960
Steve Irwin	Television	6320 Hollywood Boulevard	April 26, 2018
The Isley Brothers	Recording	7051 Hollywood Boulevard	January 28, 2026
Jose Iturbi	Recording	6834 Hollywood Boulevard	February 8, 1960

== J ==
Name	Category	Address	Date
Hugh Jackman	Motion pictures	6931 Hollywood Boulevard	December 13, 2012
Alan Jackson	Recording	6901 Hollywood Boulevard	April 16, 2010
Curtis "50 Cent"; Jackson	Recording	6250 Hollywood Boulevard	January 30, 2020
Janet Jackson	Recording	1500 Vine Street	April 20, 1990
Mahalia Jackson	Recording	6840 Hollywood Boulevard	September 1, 1988
Michael Jackson [radio commentator]	Radio	1541 Vine Street	August 22, 1984
Michael Jackson	Recording	6927 Hollywood Boulevard	November 20, 1984
Peter Jackson	Motion pictures	6801 Hollywood Boulevard	December 8, 2014
Samuel L. Jackson	Motion pictures	7018 Hollywood Boulevard	June 13, 2000
Sherry Jackson	Television	6324 Hollywood Boulevard	February 8, 1960
The Jacksons	Recording	1500 Vine Street	September 3, 1980
Dean Jagger	Motion pictures	1623 Vine Street	February 8, 1960
Jimmy Jam & Terry Lewis	Recording	6363 Hollywood Boulevard	March 10, 1993
Dennis James	Television	6753 Hollywood Boulevard	September 10, 1992
Etta James	Recording	7080 Hollywood Boulevard	April 18, 2003
Harry James	Recording	6683 Hollywood Boulevard	February 8, 1960
Joni James	Recording	6814 Hollywood Boulevard	December 28, 1969
Sonny James	Recording	6630 Hollywood Boulevard	September 23, 1961
Jane's Addiction	Recording	6436 Hollywood Boulevard	October 30, 2013
Elsie Janis	Motion pictures	6770 Hollywood Boulevard	February 8, 1960
Allison Janney	Television	6100 Hollywood Boulevard	October 17, 2016
Emil Jannings	Motion pictures	1630 Vine Street	February 8, 1960
David Janssen	Television	7011 Hollywood Boulevard	May 1, 1989
Maurice Jarre	Motion pictures	6505 Hollywood Boulevard	February 3, 1994
Al Jarreau	Recording	7083 Hollywood Boulevard	March 6, 2001
Jaime Jarrin	Radio	6381 Hollywood Boulevard	September 14, 1998
Jefferson Airplane	Recording	6752 Hollywood Boulevard	October 14, 2022
Anne Jeffreys	Television	1501 Vine Street	February 8, 1960
Herb Jeffries	Recording	6672 Hollywood Boulevard	September 24, 2004
Gordon Jenkins	Recording	6626 Hollywood Boulevard	February 8, 1960
Ken Jeong	Television	1708 Vine Street	October 23, 2024
Adele Jergens	Television	7046 Hollywood Boulevard	February 8, 1960
George Jessel	Motion pictures	1777 Vine Street	February 8, 1960
Isabel Jewell	Motion pictures	1560 Vine Street	February 8, 1960
Norman Jewison	Motion pictures	7000 Hollywood Boulevard	November 14, 1998

Name	Category	Address	Date
Billy Joel	Recording	6233 Hollywood Boulevard	September 20, 2004
Scarlett Johansson	Motion pictures	6931 Hollywood Boulevard	May 2, 2012
Elton John	Recording	6915 Hollywood Boulevard	October 23, 1975
Ben Johnson	Motion pictures	7083 Hollywood Boulevard	June 2, 1994
Don Johnson	Television	7080 Hollywood Boulevard	July 26, 1996
Dwayne Johnson	Motion pictures	6801 Hollywood Boulevard	December 13, 2017
Earvin; Magic Johnson	Motion pictures	7018 Hollywood Boulevard	June 21, 2001
Nunnally Johnson	Motion pictures	6240 Hollywood Boulevard	February 8, 1960
Van Johnson	Motion pictures	6600 Hollywood Boulevard	February 8, 1960
Al Jolson	Motion pictures	6622 Hollywood Boulevard	February 8, 1960
Al Jolson	Radio	6750 Hollywood Boulevard	February 8, 1960
Al Jolson	Recording	1716 Vine Street	February 8, 1960
Jonas Brothers	Recording	7060 Hollywood Boulevard	January 30, 2023
Allan Jones	Recording	6100 Hollywood Boulevard	February 8, 1960
Buck Jones	Motion pictures	6834 Hollywood Boulevard	February 8, 1960
Chuck Jones	Motion pictures	7011 Hollywood Boulevard	February 13, 1995
Dick Jones	Television	7042 Hollywood Boulevard	February 8, 1960
Gordon Jones	Television	1623 Vine Street	February 8, 1960
Jack Jones	Recording	6104 Hollywood Boulevard	April 18, 1989
Jennifer Jones	Motion pictures	6429 Hollywood Boulevard	February 8, 1960
Quincy Jones	Recording	1500 Vine Street	March 14, 1980
Shirley Jones	Motion pictures	1541 Vine Street	February 11, 1986
Spike Jones	Radio	6290 Hollywood Boulevard	February 8, 1960
Spike Jones	Recording	1500 Vine Street	February 8, 1960
Spike Jones	Television	6818 Hollywood Blvd	February 8, 1960
Tom Jones	Recording	6608 Hollywood Boulevard	June 29, 1989
Tommy Lee Jones	Motion pictures	6925 Hollywood Boulevard	November 30, 1994
Janis Joplin	Recording	6752 Hollywood Boulevard	November 4, 2013
Michael B. Jordan	Motion pictures	6201 Hollywood Boulevard	March 1, 2023
Victor Jory	Motion pictures	6605 Hollywood Boulevard	February 8, 1960
José José	Recording	7036 Hollywood Boulevard	February 10, 2004
Louis Jourdan	Recording	6153 Hollywood Boulevard	February 8, 1960
Louis Jourdan	Television	6445 Hollywood Boulevard	February 8, 1960
Journey	Recording	6750 Hollywood Boulevard	January 21, 2004
Leatrice Joy	Motion pictures	6517 Hollywood Boulevard	February 8, 1960
Katy Jurado	Motion pictures	7065 Hollywood Boulevard	February 1, 1994

== K ==
Name	Category	Address	Date
Ellen K	Radio	6270 Hollywood Boulevard	May 10, 2012
Mindy Kaling	Television	6533 Hollywood Boulevard	February 18, 2025
Kitty Kallen	Recording	7021 Hollywood Boulevard	February 8, 1960
Herbert Kalmus	Motion pictures	6157 Hollywood Boulevard	February 8, 1960
Bob Kane	Motion pictures	6764 Hollywood Boulevard	October 21, 2015
Boris Karloff	Motion pictures	1737 Vine Street	February 8, 1960
Boris Karloff	Television	6664 Hollywood Boulevard	February 8, 1960
Casey Kasem	Radio	6931 Hollywood Boulevard	April 27, 1981
Andy Kaufman	Television	1555 Vine Street	August 24, 2023
Danny Kaye	Motion pictures	6563 Hollywood Boulevard	February 8, 1960
Danny Kaye	Recording	6125 Hollywood Boulevard	February 8, 1960
Danny Kaye	Radio	6101 Hollywood Boulevard	February 8, 1960
Sammy Kaye	Recording	6767 Hollywood Boulevard	February 8, 1960
Sammy Kaye	Television	6419 Hollywood Boulevard	February 8, 1960
Sammy Kaye	Radio	6821 Hollywood Boulevard	February 8, 1960
Elia Kazan	Motion pictures	6800 Hollywood Boulevard	February 8, 1960
KC & the Sunshine Band	Recording	7080 Hollywood Boulevard	August 2, 2002
Stacy Keach	Television	1628 Vine Street	July 31, 2019
Buster Keaton	Motion pictures	6619 Hollywood Boulevard	February 8, 1960
Buster Keaton	Television	6321 Hollywood Boulevard	February 8, 1960
Michael Keaton	Motion pictures	6931 Hollywood Boulevard	July 28, 2016
Howard Keel	Motion pictures	6253 Hollywood Boulevard	February 8, 1960
Ruby Keeler	Motion pictures	6730 Hollywood Boulevard	February 8, 1960
Bill Keene	Radio	1541 Vine Street	May 21, 1992
Bob Keeshan	Television	Sunset & Vine	June 16, 1976
Brian Keith	Television	7021 Hollywood Boulevard	June 26, 2008
Annette; Kellerman	Motion pictures	6608 Hollywood Boulevard	February 8, 1960
De Forest Kelley	Motion pictures	7021 Hollywood Boulevard	December 18, 1991
Gene Kelly	Motion pictures	6153 Hollywood Boulevard	February 8, 1960
Grace Kelly	Motion pictures	6329 Hollywood Boulevard	February 8, 1960
Nancy Kelly	Motion pictures	7021 Hollywood Boulevard	February 8, 1960
Patsy Kelly	Motion pictures	6669 Hollywood Boulevard	February 8, 1960
"Shotgun Tom" Kelly	Radio	7080 Hollywood Boulevard	April 30, 2013
Arthur Kennedy	Motion pictures	6681 Hollywood Boulevard	February 8, 1960
Arthur Kennedy	Television	1620 Vine Street	February 8, 1960
Edgar Kennedy	Motion pictures	6901 Hollywood Boulevard	February 8, 1960
George Kennedy	Motion pictures	6356 Hollywood Boulevard	October 3, 1991
John B. Kennedy	Radio	1611 Vine Street	February 8, 1960
Madge Kennedy	Motion pictures	1600 Vine Street	February 8, 1960
Stan Kenton	Recording	6340 Hollywood Boulevard	February 8, 1960
Kermit the Frog	Television	6801 Hollywood Boulevard	November 14, 2002
Deborah Kerr	Motion pictures	1709 Vine Street	February 8, 1960
J. M. Kerrigan	Motion pictures	6621 Hollywood Boulevard	February 8, 1960
Norman Kerry	Motion pictures	6724 Hollywood Boulevard	February 8, 1960
Chaka Khan	Recording	6623 Hollywood Boulevard	May 19, 2011
Angélique Kidjo	Recording	7011 Hollywood Boulevard	August 18, 2026

Name	Category	Address	Date
Nicole Kidman	Motion pictures	6801 Hollywood Boulevard	January 13, 2002
Dorothy Kilgallen	Television	6780 Hollywood Boulevard	February 8, 1960
Mark & Kim	Radio	6834 Hollywood Boulevard	February 3, 2006
Jimmy Kimmel	Television	6840 Hollywood Boulevard	January 25, 2013
Andrea King	Television	1547 Vine Street	February 8, 1960
B B King	Recording	6771 Hollywood Boulevard	August 21, 1990
Billie Jean King	Sports Entertainment	6284 Hollywood Boulevard	April 7, 2025
Carole King	Recording	6906 Hollywood Boulevard	December 3, 2012
Henry King	Motion pictures	6327 Hollywood Boulevard	February 8, 1960
John Reed King	Radio	6402 Hollywood Boulevard	February 8, 1960
Larry King	Television	6616 Hollywood Boulevard	May 8, 1997
Pee Wee King	Recording	1715 Vine Street	February 8, 1960
Peggy King	Television	6563 Hollywood Boulevard	February 8, 1960
Wayne King	Radio	6251 Hollywood Boulevard	February 8, 1960
Ben Kingsley	Motion pictures	6931 Hollywood Boulevard	May 27, 2010
Joe Kirkwood Jr.	Television	1632 Vine Street	February 8, 1960
Dorothy Kirsten	Recording	6331 Hollywood Boulevard	February 8, 1960
KISS	Recording	7080 Hollywood Boulevard	August 11, 1999
Eartha Kitt	Recording	6656 Hollywood Boulevard	February 8, 1960
Kevin Kline	Motion pictures	7000 Hollywood Boulevard	December 3, 2004
Jack Klugman	Television	6555 Hollywood Boulevard	January 7, 1988
Evelyn Knight	Recording	6136 Hollywood Boulevard	February 8, 1960
Gladys Knight	Recording	7083 Hollywood Boulevard	June 27, 1995
June Knight	Motion pictures	6247 Hollywood Boulevard	February 8, 1960
Raymond Knight	Radio	6130 Hollywood Boulevard	February 8, 1960
Ted Knight	Television	6673 Hollywood Boulevard	January 30, 1985
Don Knotts	Television	7083 Hollywood Boulevard	January 19, 2000
Patric Knowles	Television	6542 Hollywood Boulevard	February 8, 1960
Peggy Knudsen	Television	6262 Hollywood Boulevard	February 8, 1960
Walter Koenig	Television	6679 Hollywood Boulevard	September 10, 2012
Kool & the Gang	Recording	7065 Hollywood Boulevard	October 8, 2015
Theodore Kosloff	Motion pictures	1617 Vine Street	February 8, 1960
Andre Kostelanetz	Recording	6542 Hollywood Boulevard	February 8, 1960
Henry Koster	Motion pictures	6762 Hollywood Boulevard	February 8, 1960
Ernie Kovacs	Television	6307 Hollywood Boulevard	February 8, 1960
Dave Koz	Recording	1750 Vine Street	September 22, 2009
Stanley Kramer	Motion pictures	6100 Hollywood Boulevard	February 8, 1960
Lenny Kravitz	Recording	1750 Vine Street	March 12, 2024
Fritz Kreisler	Recording	6655 Hollywood Boulevard	February 8, 1960
Kurt Kreuger	Motion pictures	1560 Vine Street	February 8, 1960
Sid & Marty Krofft	Television	6201 Hollywood Boulevard	February 13, 2020
Otto Kruger	Motion pictures	1734 Vine Street	February 8, 1960
Otto Kruger	Television	6331 Hollywood Boulevard	February 8, 1960
KTLA	Special	7018 Hollywood Boulevard	January 24, 2007
Kay Kyser	Radio	1601 Vine Street	February 8, 1960
Kay Kyser	Recording	1708 Vine Street	February 8, 1960

== L ==
Name	Category	Address	Date
L. A. P. D. Hollywood	Special	6777 Hollywood Boulevard	March 10, 2006
Gregory La Cava	Motion pictures	6906 Hollywood Boulevard	February 8, 1960
Laura La Plante	Motion pictures	6378 Hollywood Boulevard	February 8, 1960
Rod La Rocque	Motion pictures	1580 Vine Street	February 8, 1960
Julius La Rosa	Television	6290 Hollywood Boulevard	February 8, 1960
Patti LaBelle	Recording	7000 Hollywood Boulevard	March 4, 1993
Art Laboe	Radio	6800 Hollywood Boulevard	July 17, 1981
Alan Ladd	Motion pictures	1601 Vine Street	February 8, 1960
Alan Ladd Jr.	Motion pictures	7018 Hollywood Boulevard	September 28, 2007
Diane Ladd	Motion pictures	6270 Hollywood Boulevard	November 1, 2010
Jim Ladd	Radio	7018 Hollywood Boulevard	May 6, 2005
Sue Carol Ladd	Motion pictures	1639 Vine Street	September 8, 1982
Carl Laemmle	Motion pictures	6301 Hollywood Boulevard	February 8, 1960
Frankie Laine	Recording	6385 Hollywood Boulevard	February 8, 1960
Frankie Laine	Television	1645 Vine Street	February 8, 1960
Alice Lake	Motion pictures	1624 Vine Street	February 8, 1960
Arthur Lake	Radio	6646 Hollywood Boulevard	February 8, 1960
Veronica Lake	Motion pictures	6918 Hollywood Boulevard	February 8, 1960
Jack LaLanne	Television	7000 Hollywood Boulevard	September 26, 2002
Guy Laliberté; Cirque du Soleil	Live performance	6801 Hollywood Boulevard	November 22, 2010
Barbara LaMarr	Motion pictures	1621 Vine Street	February 8, 1960
Hedy Lamarr	Motion pictures	6247 Hollywood Boulevard	February 8, 1960
Dorothy Lamour	Motion pictures	6332 Hollywood Boulevard	February 8, 1960
Dorothy Lamour	Radio	6240 Hollywood Boulevard	February 8, 1960
Burt Lancaster	Motion pictures	6801 Hollywood Boulevard	August 15, 1958
Martin Landau	Motion pictures	6801 Hollywood Boulevard	December 17, 2001
Elissa Landi	Motion pictures	1611 Vine Street	February 8, 1960
Carole Landis	Motion pictures	1765 Vine Street	February 8, 1960
Michael Landon	Television	1500 Vine Street	August 15, 1984
Klaus Landsberg	Television	1500 Vine Street	May 13, 1985
Abbe Lane	Television	6385 Hollywood Boulevard	February 8, 1960
Dick Lane	Television	6317 Hollywood Boulevard	February 8, 1960
Nathan Lane	Motion pictures	6801 Hollywood Boulevard	January 9, 2005
Sidney Lanfield	Motion pictures	6101 Hollywood Boulevard	February 8, 1960
Fritz Lang	Motion pictures	1600 Vine Street	February 8, 1960
Lang Lang	Live performance	7044 Hollywood Boulevard	April 10, 2024
Walter Lang	Motion pictures	6520 Hollywood Boulevard	February 8, 1960
Harry Langdon	Motion pictures	6927 Hollywood Boulevard	February 8, 1960
Frances Langford	Motion pictures	1500 Vine Street	February 8, 1960
Frances Langford	Radio	1525 Vine Street	February 8, 1960
John Langley	Television	6667 Hollywood Boulevard	February 11, 2011
Angela Lansbury	Motion pictures	6623 Hollywood Boulevard	February 8, 1960
Angela Lansbury	Television	6259 Hollywood Boulevard	February 8, 1960
Joi Lansing	Television	6529 Hollywood Boulevard	February 8, 1960
Sherry Lansing	Motion pictures	6925 Hollywood Boulevard	July 31, 1996
Walter Lantz	Motion pictures	7000 Hollywood Boulevard	March 5, 1986
Mario Lanza	Recording	1751 Vine Street	February 8, 1960
Mario Lanza	Motion pictures	6821 Hollywood Boulevard	February 8, 1960
Milt & Bill Larsen	Live performance	6931 Hollywood Boulevard	September 15, 2006
Glen A. Larson	Television	6673 Hollywood Boulevard	October 23, 1985
Jesse Lasky	Motion pictures	6433 Hollywood Boulevard	February 8, 1960
John Lasseter	Motion pictures	6834 Hollywood Boulevard	November 1, 2011
Lassie	Motion pictures	6368 Hollywood Boulevard	February 8, 1960
Queen Latifah	Motion pictures	6915 Hollywood Boulevard	January 4, 2006
Charles Laughton	Motion pictures	7021 Hollywood Boulevard	February 8, 1960
Cyndi Lauper	Recording	6243 Hollywood Boulevard	April 11, 2016
Stan Laurel	Motion pictures	7021 Hollywood Boulevard	February 8, 1960
Hugh Laurie	Television	6712 Hollywood Boulevard	October 25, 2016
Avril Lavigne	Recording	6212 Hollywood Boulevard	August 31, 2022
Jude Law	Motion pictures	6840 Hollywood Boulevard	December 12, 2024
Peter Lawford	Television	6922 Hollywood Boulevard	February 8, 1960
Ralph Lawler	Radio	1708 Vine Street	March 3, 2016
Barbara Lawrence	Television	1735 Vine Street	February 8, 1960
Carol Lawrence	Live performance	6211 Hollywood Boulevard	February 27, 1985
Martin Lawrence	Television	6617 Hollywood Boulevard	April 20, 2023
Steve Lawrence & Eydie Gorme	Recording	1541 Vine Street	February 8, 1960
Cloris Leachman	Television	6435 Hollywood Boulevard	September 22, 1980
Norman Lear	Television	6615 Hollywood Boulevard	July 16, 1975
Francis Lederer	Motion pictures	6902 Hollywood Boulevard	February 8, 1960
Anna Lee	Motion pictures	6777 Hollywood Boulevard	January 7, 1993
Bruce Lee	Motion pictures	6933 Hollywood Boulevard	April 28, 1993
Gypsy Rose Lee	Motion pictures	6351 Hollywood Boulevard	February 8, 1960
Lila Lee	Motion pictures	1716 Vine Street	February 8, 1960
Michele Lee	Television	6363 Hollywood Boulevard	November 19, 1998
Peggy Lee	Recording	6319 Hollywood Boulevard	February 8, 1960
Pinky Lee	Television	6201 Hollywood Boulevard	February 8, 1960
Rowland Lee	Motion pictures	6313 Hollywood Boulevard	February 8, 1960
Ruta Lee	Live performance	6901 Hollywood Boulevard	October 10, 2006
Stan Lee	Motion pictures	7072 Hollywood Boulevard	January 4, 2011
Lottie Lehmann (Note: Lotte Lehmann star misspelled as "Lottie".)	Recording	1735 Hollywood Boulevard	February 8, 1960
Leiber & Stoller	Recording	7083 Hollywood Boulevard	November 3, 1994
Janet Leigh	Motion pictures	1777 Vine Street	February 8, 1960
Vivien Leigh	Motion pictures	6773 Hollywood Boulevard	February 8, 1960
Mitchell Leisen	Motion pictures	6241 Hollywood Boulevard	February 8, 1960
Jack Lemmon	Motion pictures	6357 Hollywood Boulevard	February 8, 1960
John Lennon	Recording	1750 Vine Street	September 30, 1988
The Lennon Sisters	Television	1500 Vine Street	December 15, 1987
Jay Leno	Television	6780 Hollywood Boulevard	April 27, 2000
Robert Z. Leonard	Motion pictures	6370 Hollywood Boulevard	February 8, 1960
Mervyn Le Roy	Motion pictures	1560 Vine Street	February 8, 1960
Jack Lescoulie	Television	6500 Hollywood Boulevard	February 8, 1960
Joan Leslie	Television	1560 Vine Street	February 8, 1960
Sol Lesser	Motion pictures	6533 Hollywood Boulevard	February 8, 1960
Earl Lestz	Motion pictures	6807 Hollywood Boulevard	July 9, 2004
The Lettermen	Recording	1765 Vine Street	February 24, 2020
Oscar Levant	Recording	6728 Hollywood Boulevard	February 8, 1960
Adam Levine	Recording	6752 Hollywood Boulevard	February 10, 2017
Eugene Levy	Television	7080 Hollywood Boulevard	March 8, 2024
Fulton Lewis	Radio	6258 Hollywood Boulevard	February 8, 1960
Jenifer Lewis	Television	6284 Hollywood Boulevard	July 15, 2022
Jerry Lewis	Television	6150 Hollywood Boulevard	February 8, 1960
Jerry Lewis	Motion pictures	6821 Hollywood Boulevard	February 8, 1960

Name	Category	Address	Date
Jerry Lee Lewis	Recording	6631 Hollywood Boulevard	June 13, 1989
Robert Q Lewis	Television	1709 Vine Street	February 8, 1960
Shari Lewis	Television	6743 Hollywood Boulevard	August 18, 1976
Bill Leyden	Television	6136 Hollywood Boulevard	February 8, 1960
Liberace	Recording	6527 Hollywood Boulevard	February 8, 1960
Liberace	Television	6739 Hollywood Boulevard	February 8, 1960
Al Lichtman	Motion pictures	6821 Hollywood Boulevard	February 8, 1960
Judith Light	Live performance	6200 Hollywood Boulevard	September 12, 2019
Beatrice Lillie	Motion pictures	6404 Hollywood Boulevard	February 8, 1960
Elmo Lincoln	Motion pictures	7042 Hollywood Boulevard	February 8, 1960
Eric Linden	Motion pictures	1648 Vine Street	February 8, 1960
Kate Linder	Television	7021 Hollywood Boulevard	April 10, 2008
Margaret Lindsay	Motion pictures	6318 Hollywood Boulevard	February 8, 1960
Art Linkletter	Radio	6363 Hollywood Boulevard	February 8, 1960
Art Linkletter	Television	1560 Vine Street	February 8, 1960
Laura Linney	Television	6533 Hollywood Boulevard	July 25, 2022
Ray Liotta	Motion pictures	6201 Hollywood Boulevard	February 24, 2023
John Lithgow	Television	6666 Hollywood Boulevard	May 2, 2001
Cleavon Little	Motion pictures	7080 Hollywood Boulevard	February 1, 1994
Little Jack Little	Radio	6618 Hollywood Boulevard	February 8, 1960
Rich Little	Television	6372 Hollywood Boulevard	July 27, 1983
Anatole Litvak	Motion pictures	6635 Hollywood Boulevard	February 8, 1960
Lucy Liu	Television	1708 Vine Street	May 1, 2019
Livingston & Evans	Recording	7083 Hollywood Boulevard	January 12, 1995
Mary Livingston (Note: Mary Livingstone's star is misspelled as "Livingston".)	Radio	6705 Hollywood Boulevard	February 8, 1960
LL Cool J	Recording	6901 Hollywood Boulevard	January 21, 2016
Frank Lloyd	Motion pictures	6667 Hollywood Boulevard	February 8, 1960
Harold Lloyd	Motion pictures	1503 Vine Street	February 8, 1960
Sir Andrew Lloyd Webber	Live performance	6233 Hollywood Boulevard	February 26, 1993
Gene Lockhart	Motion pictures	6307 Hollywood Boulevard	February 8, 1960
Gene Lockhart	Television	6681 Hollywood Boulevard	February 8, 1960
June Lockhart	Motion pictures	6323 Hollywood Boulevard	February 8, 1960
June Lockhart	Television	6362 Hollywood Boulevard	February 8, 1960
Kathleen Lockhart	Motion pictures	6241 Hollywood Boulevard	February 8, 1960
Marcus Loew	Motion pictures	1617 Vine Street	February 8, 1960
Joshua Logan	Motion pictures	6235 Hollywood Boulevard	February 8, 1960
Kenny Loggins	Recording	7021 Hollywood Boulevard	August 23, 2000
Al Lohman & Roger Barkley	Radio	1540 Vine Street	December 4, 1985
Gina Lollobrigida	Motion pictures	6361 Hollywood Boulevard	February 1, 2018
Carole Lombard	Motion pictures	6930 Hollywood Boulevard	February 8, 1960
Guy Lombardo	Radio	6677 Hollywood Boulevard	February 8, 1960
Guy Lombardo	Television	6363 Hollywood Boulevard	February 8, 1960
Guy Lombardo	Recording	6666 Hollywood Boulevard	February 8, 1960
Julie London	Recording	7000 Hollywood Boulevard	February 8, 1960
Nia Long	Motion pictures	6150 Hollywood Boulevard	September 16, 2026
Eva Longoria	Television	6906 Hollywood Boulevard	April 16, 2018
George Lopez	Television	6801 Hollywood Boulevard	March 29, 2006
Israel Lopez Cachao	Recording	6554 Hollywood Boulevard	March 14, 2003
Jennifer Lopez	Recording	6262 Hollywood Boulevard	June 20, 2013
Mario Lopez	Television	6930 Hollywood Boulevard	October 10, 2024
Vincent Lopez	Radio	6609 Hollywood Boulevard	February 8, 1960
Marjorie Lord	Television	6317 Hollywood Boulevard	February 8, 1960
Phillips Lord	Radio	6912 Hollywood Boulevard	February 8, 1960
Sophia Loren	Motion pictures	7050 Hollywood Boulevard	February 1, 1994
Chuck Lorre	Television	7021 Hollywood Boulevard	March 12, 2009
Peter Lorre	Motion pictures	6619 Hollywood Boulevard	February 8, 1960
Los Angeles Dodgers	Special	6800 Hollywood Boulevard	June 20, 2008
Los Angeles Fire Dept	Special	6801 Hollywood Boulevard	December 12, 2025
Los Angeles Times	Special	7018 Hollywood Boulevard	December 7, 2006
Los Bukis	Recording	7060 Hollywood Bouelvard	July 23, 2025
Los Huracanes; Del Norte	Recording	7060 Hollywood Boulevard	September 7, 2022
Los Tigres del Norte	Recording	7060 Hollywood Boulevard	August 21, 2014
Julia Louis– Dreyfus	Television	6250 Hollywood Boulevard	April 5, 2010
Anita Louise	Motion pictures	6821 Hollywood Boulevard	February 8, 1960
Bessie Love	Motion pictures	6777 Hollywood Boulevard	February 8, 1960
Frank Lovejoy	Television	6325 Hollywood Boulevard	February 8, 1960
Edmund Lowe	Motion pictures	6363 Hollywood Boulevard	February 8, 1960
Edmund Lowe	Television	6601 Hollywood Boulevard	February 8, 1960
Jim Lowe	Recording	6333 Hollywood Boulevard	February 8, 1960
Rob Lowe	Television	6667 Hollywood Boulevard	December 8, 2015
Myrna Loy	Motion pictures	6685 Hollywood Boulevard	February 8, 1960
Lisa Lu	Motion pictures	1708 Vine Street	May 5, 2025
Sigmund Lubin	Motion pictures	6166 Hollywood Boulevard	February 8, 1960
Ernst Lubitsch	Motion pictures	7042 Hollywood Boulevard	February 8, 1960
Norman Luboff	Recording	1620 Vine Street	February 8, 1960
Susan Lucci	Television	6801 Hollywood Boulevard	January 28, 2005
Ludacris	Motion pictures	6426 Hollywood Boulevard	May 18, 2023
Allen Ludden	Television	6743 Hollywood Boulevard	March 31, 1988
Bela Lugosi	Motion pictures	6340 Hollywood Boulevard	February 8, 1960
Paul Lukas	Motion pictures	6821 Hollywood Boulevard	February 8, 1960
Keye Luke	Motion pictures	7000 Hollywood Boulevard	December 5, 1990
August Lumiere (Note: Auguste Lumière star misspelled as "August".)	Motion pictures	6320 Hollywood Boulevard	February 8, 1960
Louis Lumiere	Motion pictures	1529 Vine Street	February 8, 1960
Humberto Luna	Radio	1540 Vine Street	October 12, 1990
Art Lund	Recording	6126 Hollywood Boulevard	February 8, 1960
William Lundigan	Television	6600 Hollywood Boulevard	February 8, 1960
Ida Lupino	Television	1724 Vine Street	February 8, 1960
Ida Lupino	Motion pictures	6821 Hollywood Boulevard	February 8, 1960
John Lupton	Television	1713 Vine Street	February 8, 1960
Frank Luther	Recording	1708 Vine Street	February 8, 1960
A. C. Lyles	Motion pictures	6840 Hollywood Boulevard	March 3, 1988
Frankie Lymon	Recording	7083 Hollywood Boulevard	February 1, 1994
Jane Lynch	Television	6640 Hollywood Boulevard	September 4, 2013
Diana Lynn	Motion pictures	1625 Vine Street	February 8, 1960
Diana Lynn	Television	6350 Hollywood Boulevard	February 8, 1960
Loretta Lynn	Recording	1515 Vine Street	January 11, 1978
Jeff Lynne	Recording	1750 Vine Street	April 23, 2015
Ben Lyon	Motion pictures	1724 Vine Street	February 8, 1960
Bert Lytell	Motion pictures	6417 Hollywood Boulevard	February 8, 1960
Nigel Lythgoe	Television	6258 Hollywood Boulevard	July 9, 2021

== M ==
Name	Category	Address	Date
Ralph Macchio	Television	6633 Hollywood Boulevard	November 20, 2024
Jeanette MacDonald	Motion pictures	6157 Hollywood Boulevard	February 8, 1960
Jeanette MacDonald	Recording	1628 Vine Street	February 8, 1960
Katherine; MacDonald	Motion pictures	6759 Hollywood Boulevard	February 8, 1960
Seth MacFarlane	Television	6259 Hollywood Boulevard	April 23, 2019
Ali MacGraw	Motion pictures	7057 Hollywood Boulevard	February 12, 2021
Helen Mack	Motion pictures	6310 Hollywood Boulevard	February 8, 1960
Ted Mack	Television	6300 Hollywood Boulevard	February 8, 1960
Gisele MacKenzie	Television	1601 Vine Street	February 8, 1960
Shirley MacLaine	Motion pictures	1617 Vine Street	February 8, 1960
Barton MacLane	Television	6719 Hollywood Boulevard	February 8, 1960
Fred MacMurray	Motion pictures	6421 Hollywood Boulevard	February 8, 1960
Jeanie MacPherson	Motion pictures	6150 Hollywood Boulevard	February 8, 1960
Gordon MacRae	Radio	6325 Hollywood Boulevard	February 8, 1960
William H. Macy	Motion pictures	7072 Hollywood Boulevard	March 7, 2012
Andy Madadian	Recording	6810 Hollywood Boulevard	January 17, 2020
Johnny Maddox	Recording	6401 Hollywood Boulevard	February 8, 1960
Guy Madison	Radio	6933 Hollywood Boulevard	February 8, 1960
Guy Madison	Television	6333 Hollywood Boulevard	February 8, 1960
Anna Magnani	Motion pictures	6385 Hollywood Boulevard	February 8, 1960
Bill Maher	Television	1634 Vine Street	September 14, 2010
Midge; Maisel	Special	6126 Hollywood Boulevard	May 22, 2023
Lee Majors	Television	6931 Hollywood Boulevard	September 8, 1984
Mako	Motion pictures	7095 Hollywood Boulevard	February 1, 1994
Karl Malden	Motion pictures	6231 Hollywood Boulevard	February 8, 1960
Dorothy Malone	Motion pictures	1716 Vine Street	February 8, 1960
Ted Malone	Radio	1628 Vine Street	February 8, 1960
Rouben; Mamoulian	Motion pictures	1709 Vine Street	February 8, 1960
Maná	Recording	7060 Hollywood Boulevard	February 10, 2016
Henry Mancini	Recording	6821 Hollywood Boulevard	September 22, 1982
Howie Mandel	Television	6366 Hollywood Boulevard	September 4, 2008
Barry Manilow	Recording	6233 Hollywood Boulevard	September 22, 1980
Joseph L Mankiewicz	Motion pictures	6201 Hollywood Boulevard	February 8, 1960
Anthony Mann	Motion pictures	6229 Hollywood Boulevard	February 8, 1960
Delbert Mann	Motion pictures	1716 Vine Street	February 8, 1960
Hank Mann	Motion pictures	6300 Hollywood Boulevard	February 8, 1960
Jayne Mansfield	Motion pictures	6328 Hollywood Boulevard	February 8, 1960
Joe Mantegna	Live performance	6654 Hollywood Boulevard	April 29, 2011
Mantovani	Recording	1708 Vine Street	February 8, 1960
Fredric March	Motion pictures	1620 Vine Street	February 8, 1960
Hal March	Radio	1560 Vine Street	February 8, 1960
Hal March	Television	6536 Hollywood Boulevard	February 8, 1960
Julianna Margulies	Television	6621 Hollywood Boulevard	May 1, 2015
Angélica María	Live performance	7060 Hollywood Boulevard	May 25, 2016
Rose Marie	Television	7083 Hollywood Boulevard	October 3, 2001
Mark & Brian	Radio	6767 Hollywood Boulevard	September 25, 1997
Mark & Kim	Radio	6834 Hollywood Boulevard	February 3, 2006
Bob Marley	Recording	7080 Hollywood Boulevard	February 6, 2001
J. Peverell; Marley	Motion pictures	6819 Hollywood Boulevard	February 8, 1960
Jess Marlow	Television	6420 Hollywood Boulevard	May 14, 1999
Mae Marsh	Motion pictures	1600 Vine Street	February 8, 1960
Garry Marshall	Television	6838 Hollywood Boulevard	November 23, 1983
George Marshall	Motion pictures	7048 Hollywood Boulevard	February 8, 1960
Herbert Marshall	Motion pictures	6200 Hollywood Boulevard	February 8, 1960
Penny Marshall	Motion pictures	7021 Hollywood Boulevard	August 12, 2004
Rowan & Martin	Television	7080 Hollywood Boulevard	April 2, 2002
Dean Martin	Motion pictures	6519 Hollywood Boulevard	February 8, 1960
Dean Martin	Recording	1617 Vine Street	February 8, 1960
Dean Martin	Television	6651 Hollywood Boulevard	February 8, 1960
Freddy Martin	Recording	6532 Hollywood Boulevard	February 8, 1960
Marion Martin	Motion pictures	6915 Hollywood Boulevard	February 8, 1960
Mary Martin	Radio	6609 Hollywood Boulevard	February 8, 1960
Mary Martin	Recording	1560 Vine Street	February 8, 1960
Quinn Martin	Television	6667 Hollywood Boulevard	December 17, 1974
Ricky Martin	Recording	6901 Hollywood Boulevard	October 16, 2007
Tony Martin	Motion pictures	6436 Hollywood Boulevard	February 8, 1960
Tony Martin	Radio	1760 Vine Street	February 8, 1960
Tony Martin	Recording	6331 Hollywood Boulevard	February 8, 1960
Tony Martin	Television	1725 Vine Street	February 8, 1960
Wink Martindale	Radio	7018 Hollywood Boulevard	June 2, 2006
Groucho Marx	Television	1734 Vine Street	February 8, 1960
Groucho Marx	Radio	6821 Hollywood Boulevard	February 8, 1960
James Mason	Television	6821 Hollywood Boulevard	February 8, 1960
Ilona Massey	Motion pictures	1623 Vine Street	February 8, 1960
Raymond Massey	Motion pictures	1719 Vine Street	February 8, 1960
Raymond Massey	Television	6706 Hollywood Boulevard	February 8, 1960
Judge Greg Mathis	Television	7076 Hollywood Boulevard	May 4, 2022
Johnny Mathis	Recording	1501 Vine Street	June 1, 1972
Marlee Matlin	Motion pictures	6667 Hollywood Boulevard	May 6, 2009
Walter Matthau	Motion pictures	6357 Hollywood Boulevard	March 9, 1982
Victor Mature	Motion pictures	6780 Hollywood Boulevard	February 8, 1960
Louis B. Mayer	Motion pictures	1637 Vine Street	February 8, 1960
Ken Maynard	Motion pictures	6751 Hollywood Boulevard	February 8, 1960
Archie Mayo	Motion pictures	6301 Hollywood Boulevard	February 8, 1960
Virginia Mayo	Television	1751 Vine Street	February 8, 1960
Paul Mazursky	Motion pictures	6667 Hollywood Boulevard	December 13, 2013
Rachel McAdams	Motion pictures	6922 Hollywood Boulevard	January 20, 2026
May McAvoy	Motion pictures	1731 Vine Street	February 8, 1960
Mary Margaret McBride	Radio	7018 Hollywood Boulevard	February 8, 1960
Irish Mc Calla	Television	1720 Vine Street	February 8, 1960
Mercedes; McCambridge	Motion pictures	1720 Vine Street	February 8, 1960
Mercedes; McCambridge	Television	6243 Hollywood Boulevard	February 8, 1960
Leo McCarey	Motion pictures	1500 Vine Street	February 8, 1960
Clem McCarthy	Radio	6563 Hollywood Boulevard	February 8, 1960
Melissa McCarthy	Motion pictures	6927 Hollywood Boulevard	May 19, 2015
Paul Mc Cartney	Recording	1750 Vine Street	February 9, 2012
Doug Mc Clure	Television	7065 Hollywood Boulevard	December 16, 1994
Matthew McConaughey	Motion pictures	6931 Hollywood Boulevard	November 17, 2014
Smilin' Ed; McConnell	Radio	6650 Hollywood Boulevard	February 8, 1960
Eric McCormack	Television	6201 Hollywood Boulevard	September 13, 2018
Patty Mc Cormack	Motion pictures	6312 Hollywood Boulevard	February 8, 1960
Larry McCormick	Television	6420 Hollywood Boulevard	October 10, 2002
Clyde McCoy	Recording	6426 Hollywood Boulevard	February 8, 1960
Tim McCoy	Motion pictures	1600 Vine Street	February 8, 1960
Tex McCrary	Television	1628 Vine Street	February 8, 1960
Joel McCrea	Motion pictures	6901 Hollywood Boulevard	February 8, 1960
Joel McCrea	Radio	6241 Hollywood Boulevard	February 8, 1960
Hattie McDaniel	Motion pictures	1719 Vine Street	February 8, 1960
Hattie McDaniel	Radio	6933 Hollywood Boulevard	February 8, 1960
Roddy McDowall	Television	6632 Hollywood Boulevard	February 8, 1960
Malcolm McDowell	Motion pictures	6714 Hollywood Boulevard	March 16, 2012
Reba McEntire	Recording	7018 Hollywood Boulevard	September 18, 1998
Spanky McFarland	Motion pictures	7095 Hollywood Boulevard	February 1, 1994
Charles McGraw	Television	6927 Hollywood Boulevard	February 8, 1960
Dr. Phil McGraw	Television	6201 Hollywood Boulevard	February 21, 2020
Tim McGraw	Recording	6901 Hollywood Boulevard	October 17, 2006
Ewan McGregor	Motion pictures	6840 Hollywood Boulevard	September 12, 2024
Dorothy McGuire	Motion pictures	6933 Hollywood Boulevard	February 8, 1960
Adam McKay	Motion pictures	6767 Hollywood Boulevard	February 17, 2022
Rod Mc Kuen	Recording	1501 Vine Street	December 17, 1975
Victor McLaglen	Motion pictures	1735 Vine Street	February 8, 1960
Don McLean	Recording	6300 Hollywood Boulevard	August 16, 2021
Norman Z. McLeod	Motion pictures	1724 Vine Street	February 8, 1960
Ed McMahon	Television	7000 Hollywood Boulevard	March 20, 1986
Vince McMahon	Television	6801 Hollywood Boulevard	March 14, 2008
Graham McNamee	Radio	6405 Hollywood Boulevard	February 8, 1960
Don McNeill	Radio	6301 Hollywood Boulevard	February 8, 1960
Steve McQueen	Motion pictures	6834 Hollywood Boulevard	June 12, 1986
Audrey Meadows	Television	6100 Hollywood Boulevard	February 8, 1960
Jerry Stiller; Anne Meara	Television	7018 Hollywood Boulevard	February 9, 2007
Mike Medavoy	Motion pictures	6801 Hollywood Boulevard	September 19, 2005
Donald Meek	Motion pictures	1752 Vine Street	February 8, 1960

Name	Category	Address	Date
George Meeker	Motion pictures	6101 Hollywood Boulevard	February 8, 1960
Zubin Mehta	Recording	1600 Vine Street	March 1, 2011
Thomas Meighan	Motion pictures	1719 Vine Street	February 8, 1960
Meiklejohn	Motion pictures	1777 Vine Street	February 8, 1960
Melachrino	Recording	1625 Vine Street	February 8, 1960
Lauritz Melchior	Recording	1718 Vine Street	February 8, 1960
Chris Meledandri	Motion pictures	6357 Hollywood Boulevard	June 10, 2026
James Melton	Radio	6300 Hollywood Boulevard	February 8, 1960
James Melton	Recording	6564 Hollywood Boulevard	February 8, 1960
Rafael Mendez	Recording	6767 Hollywood Boulevard	March 2, 1983
Adolphe Menjou	Motion pictures	6826 Hollywood Boulevard	February 8, 1960
Alan Menken	Motion pictures	6834 Hollywood Boulevard	November 10, 2010
Yehudi Menuhin	Recording	6710 Hollywood Boulevard	February 8, 1960
Idina Menzel	Live performance	6225 Hollywood Boulevard	November 19, 2019
Johnny Mercer	Television	1628 Vine Street	February 8, 1960
Burgess Meredith	Motion pictures	6904 Hollywood Boulevard	November 5, 1987
Una Merkel	Motion pictures	6262 Hollywood Boulevard	February 8, 1960
Ethel Merman	Motion pictures	7044 Hollywood Boulevard	February 8, 1960
Ethel Merman	Recording	1751 Vine Street	February 8, 1960
Robert Merrill	Recording	6763 Hollywood Boulevard	February 8, 1960
Debra Messing	Television	6201 Hollywood Boulevard	October 6, 2017
Al Michaels	Television	6667 Hollywood Boulevard	October 13, 2004
Lorne Michaels	Television	6627 Hollywood Boulevard	August 19, 1999
Oscar Micheaux	Motion pictures	6721 Hollywood Boulevard	February 13, 1987
Mickey Mouse	Motion pictures	6925 Hollywood Boulevard	November 13, 1978
Bette Midler	Recording	6922 Hollywood Boulevard	February 6, 1985
Toshiro Mifune	Motion pictures	6912 Hollywood Boulevard	November 14, 2016
Luis Miguel	Recording	7060 Hollywood Boulevard	September 26, 1996
David Milch	Television	6840 Hollywood Boulevard	June 8, 2006
Vera Miles	Television	1652 Vine Street	February 8, 1960
Lewis Milestone	Motion pictures	7021 Hollywood Boulevard	February 8, 1960
Ray Milland	Motion pictures	1621 Vine Street	February 8, 1960
Ray Milland	Television	1634 Vine Street	February 8, 1960
Ann Miller	Motion pictures	6914 Hollywood Boulevard	February 8, 1960
Bob Miller	Television	6757 Hollywood Boulevard	October 2, 2006
Glenn Miller	Recording	6915 Hollywood Boulevard	February 8, 1960
Marilyn Miller	Motion pictures	6301 Hollywood Boulevard	February 8, 1960
Marvin Miller	Television	6101 Hollywood Boulevard	February 8, 1960
Mitch Miller	Recording	7013 Hollywood Boulevard	February 8, 1960
The Mills Bros.	Recording	7000 Hollywood Boulevard	December 31, 1969
Nathan Milstein	Recording	6379 Hollywood Boulevard	February 8, 1960
Liza Minnelli	Live performance	7000 Hollywood Boulevard	September 30, 1991
Vincente Minnelli	Motion pictures	6676 Hollywood Boulevard	February 8, 1960
Minnie Mouse	Motion pictures	6834 Hollywood Boulevard	January 22, 2018
Mary Miles Minter	Motion pictures	1724 Vine Street	February 8, 1960
Ken Minyard & Bob Arthur	Radio	6808 Hollywood Boulevard	August 6, 1986
The Miracles	Recording	7060 Hollywood Boulevard	March 20, 2009
Carmen Miranda	Motion pictures	6262 Hollywood Boulevard	February 8, 1960
Lin-Manuel Miranda	Live performance	6243 Hollywood Boulevard	November 30, 2018
Helen Mirren	Motion pictures	6714 Hollywood Boulevard	January 3, 2013
Don Mischer	Television	7013 Hollywood Boulevard	December 11, 2014
Everett Mitchell	Radio	6254 Hollywood Boulevard	February 8, 1960
Guy Mitchell	Recording	7000 Hollywood Boulevard	February 8, 1960
Thomas Mitchell	Motion pictures	1651 Vine Street	February 8, 1960
Thomas Mitchell	Television	6100 Hollywood Boulevard	February 8, 1960
Robert Mitchum	Motion pictures	6240 Hollywood Boulevard	January 25, 1984
Tom Mix	Motion pictures	1708 Vine Street	February 8, 1960
Hal Mohr	Motion pictures	6433 Hollywood Boulevard	May 26, 1976
Thelonious Monk	Recording	7055 Hollywood Boulevard	July 24, 1989
The Monkees	Television	6675 Hollywood Boulevard	July 10, 1989
Marilyn Monroe	Motion pictures	6774 Hollywood Boulevard	February 8, 1960
Vaughn Monroe	Radio	1755 Vine Street	February 8, 1960
Vaughn Monroe	Recording	1600 Vine Street	February 8, 1960
Ricardo Montalban (Note: The star for Ricardo Montalbán does not use the diacritic "á")	Television	7021 Hollywood Boulevard	February 8, 1960
Pierre Monteux	Recording	1725 Vine Street	February 8, 1960
Elizabeth; Montgomery	Television	6533 Hollywood Boulevard	January 4, 2008
George; Montgomery	Television	6301 Hollywood Boulevard	February 8, 1960
Robert Montgomery	Motion pictures	6440 Hollywood Boulevard	February 8, 1960
Robert Montgomery	Television	1631 Vine Street	February 8, 1960
Art Mooney	Recording	6150 Hollywood Boulevard	February 8, 1960
Clayton Moore; The Lone Ranger	Television	6914 Hollywood Boulevard	June 5, 1987
Colleen Moore	Motion pictures	1549 Vine Street	February 8, 1960
Constance Moore	Motion pictures	6270 Hollywood Boulevard	February 8, 1960
Del Moore	Television	6405 Hollywood Boulevard	February 8, 1960
Dudley Moore	Motion pictures	7000 Hollywood Boulevard	September 23, 1987
Garry Moore	Radio	1718 Vine Street	February 8, 1960
Garry Moore	Television	1680 Vine Street	February 8, 1960
Grace Moore	Motion pictures	6274 Hollywood Boulevard	February 8, 1960
Juanita Moore	Motion pictures	6100 Hollywood Boulevard	October 18, 2024
Julianne Moore	Motion pictures	6250 Hollywood Boulevard	October 3, 2013
Mandy Moore	Television	6562 Hollywood Boulevard	March 25, 2019
Mary Tyler Moore	Television	7021 Hollywood Boulevard	September 8, 1992
Matt Moore	Motion pictures	6301 Hollywood Boulevard	February 8, 1960
Melba Moore	Live performance	1645 Vine Street	August 10, 2023
Owen Moore	Motion pictures	6727 Hollywood Boulevard	February 8, 1960
Roger Moore	Motion pictures	7007 Hollywood Boulevard	October 11, 2007
Terry Moore	Motion pictures	7076 Hollywood Boulevard	February 1, 1994
Tom Moore	Motion pictures	1640 Vine Street	February 8, 1960
Victor Moore	Motion pictures	6834 Hollywood Boulevard	February 8, 1960
Agnes Moorehead	Motion pictures	1719 Vine Street	February 8, 1960
Polly Moran	Motion pictures	6300 Hollywood Boulevard	February 8, 1960
Antonio Moreno	Motion pictures	6651 Hollywood Boulevard	February 8, 1960
Rita Moreno	Motion pictures	7083 Hollywood Boulevard	July 20, 1995
Frank Morgan	Motion pictures	1708 Vine Street	February 8, 1960
Frank Morgan	Radio	6700 Hollywood Boulevard	February 8, 1960
Henry Morgan	Radio	6325 Hollywood Boulevard	February 8, 1960
Jane Morgan	Recording	6914 Hollywood Boulevard	May 6, 2011
Michele Morgan	Motion pictures	1645 Vine Street	February 8, 1960
Ralph Morgan	Motion pictures	1617 Vine Street	February 8, 1960
Robert W. Morgan	Radio	6841 Hollywood Boulevard	August 8, 1993
Russ Morgan	Recording	1751 Vine Street	February 8, 1960
Tracy Morgan	Television	6280 Hollywood Boulevard	April 10, 2018
Pat Morita	Motion pictures	6633 Hollywood Boulevard	August 4, 1994
Ennio Morricone	Live performance	7065 Hollywood Boulevard	February 26, 2016
Doug Morris	Recording	6259 Hollywood Boulevard	January 26, 2010
Garrett Morris	Television	6411 Hollywood Boulevard	February 1, 2024
Carlton E. Morse	Radio	6445 Hollywood Boulevard	February 8, 1960
Ella Mae Morse	Recording	1724 Vine Street	February 8, 1960
Jerry Moss	Recording	6933 Hollywood Boulevard	May 7, 1999
Mötley Crüe	Recording	6752 Hollywood Boulevard	January 25, 2006
Tommy Mottola	Recording	6270 Hollywood Boulevard	October 10, 2019
Jean Muir	Motion pictures	6280 Hollywood Boulevard	February 8, 1960
Jack Mulhall	Motion pictures	1724 Vine Street	February 8, 1960
Richard Mulligan	Television	6777 Hollywood Boulevard	September 30, 1993
The Munchkins	Motion pictures	6915 Hollywood Boulevard	November 20, 2007
Paul Muni	Motion pictures	6433 Hollywood Boulevard	February 8, 1960
Ona Munson	Motion pictures	6250 Hollywood Boulevard	February 8, 1960
The Muppets	Motion pictures	6834 Hollywood Boulevard	March 20, 2013
Dennis Muren	Motion pictures	6764 Hollywood Boulevard	June 3, 1999
Audie Murphy	Motion pictures	1601 Vine Street	February 8, 1960
Eddie Murphy	Motion pictures	7000 Hollywood Boulevard	June 26, 1996
George Murphy	Motion pictures	1601 Vine Street	February 8, 1960
Ryan Murphy	Television	6533 Hollywood Boulevard	December 4, 2018
Anne Murray	Recording	1750 Vine Street	June 25, 1980
Charlie Murray	Motion pictures	1719 Vine Street	February 8, 1960
Don Murray	Motion pictures	6385 Hollywood Boulevard	February 8, 1960
Jan Murray	Television	6153 Hollywood Boulevard	February 8, 1960
Ken Murray	Radio	1724 Vine Street	February 8, 1960
Mae Murray	Motion pictures	6318 Hollywood Boulevard	February 8, 1960
Edward R. Murrow	Radio	6263 Hollywood Boulevard	February 8, 1960
Musso & Frank	Special	6667 Hollywood Boulevard	September 25, 2019
Carmel Myers	Motion pictures	1751 Vine Street	February 8, 1960
Mike Myers	Motion pictures	7046 Hollywood Boulevard	July 24, 2002

== N ==
Name	Category	Address	Date
Jim Nabors	Live performance	6435 Hollywood Boulevard	January 31, 1991
Conrad Nagel	Motion pictures	1719 Vine Street	February 8, 1960
Conrad Nagel	Radio	1752 Vine Street	February 8, 1960
Conrad Nagel	Television	1752 Vine Street	February 8, 1960
Stu Nahan	Radio	6549 Hollywood Boulevard	May 25, 2007
J. Carrol Naish	Television	6145 Hollywood Boulevard	February 8, 1960
Nita Naldi	Motion pictures	6316 Hollywood Boulevard	February 8, 1960
Crosby, Stills & Nash	Recording	6666 Hollywood Boulevard	June 21, 1978
Niecy Nash	Television	6201 Hollywood Boulevard	July 11, 2018
Ogden Nash	Television	6264 Hollywood Boulevard	February 8, 1960
Nazimova	Motion pictures	6933 Hollywood Boulevard	February 8, 1960
Patricia Neal	Motion pictures	7018 Hollywood Boulevard	May 20, 2005
James Nederlander	Live performance	6233 Hollywood Boulevard	November 7, 1986
Pola Negri	Motion pictures	6140 Hollywood Boulevard	February 8, 1960
Jean Negulesco	Motion pictures	6212 Hollywood Boulevard	February 8, 1960
Marshall Neilan	Motion pictures	6241 Hollywood Boulevard	February 8, 1960
Barry Nelson	Television	6259 Hollywood Boulevard	February 8, 1960
David Nelson	Television	1501 Vine Street	May 9, 1996
Gene Nelson	Motion pictures	7005 Hollywood Boulevard	September 24, 1990
Harriet Nelson	Television	6821 Hollywood Boulevard	February 8, 1960
Ozzie Nelson	Television	6555 Hollywood Boulevard	February 8, 1960
Ozzie & Harriet Nelson	Radio	6260 Hollywood Boulevard	February 8, 1960
Rick Nelson	Recording	1515 Vine Street	September 17, 1975
Franco Nero	Motion pictures	1611 Vine Street	February 12, 2026
John Nesbitt	Motion pictures	1717 Vine Street	February 8, 1960
John Nesbitt	Radio	6200 Hollywood Boulevard	February 8, 1960
Mace Neufeld	Motion pictures	6714 Hollywood Boulevard	July 15, 2003
New Edition	Recording	7080 Hollywood Boulevard	January 23, 2017

Name	Category	Address	Date
New Kids on the Block	Recording	7072 Hollywood Boulevard	October 9, 2014
Bob Newhart	Television	6381 Hollywood Boulevard	January 6, 1999
Alfred Newman	Recording	1708 Vine Street	February 8, 1960
Paul Newman	Motion pictures	7060 Hollywood Boulevard	January 6, 1994
Randy Newman	Motion pictures	6667 Hollywood Boulevard	June 2, 2010
Wayne Newton	Recording	6909 Hollywood Boulevard	January 21, 1976
Olivia Newton – John	Recording	6925 Hollywood Boulevard	August 5, 1981
Fred Niblo	Motion pictures	7014 Hollywood Boulevard	February 8, 1960
Nicholas Brothers	Motion pictures	7083 Hollywood Boulevard	February 1, 1994
Nichelle Nichols	Television	6633 Hollywood Boulevard	January 9, 1992
Jack Nicholson	Motion pictures	6925 Hollywood Boulevard	December 4, 1996
Leslie Nielsen	Motion pictures	6541 Hollywood Boulevard	December 9, 1988
Chuck Niles	Radio	7080 Hollywood Boulevard	March 5, 1998
Ken Niles	Radio	6711 Hollywood Boulevard	February 8, 1960
Wendell Niles	Radio	1725 Vine Street	February 8, 1960
Anna Q. Nilsson	Motion pictures	6150 Hollywood Boulevard	February 8, 1960
Leonard Nimoy	Motion pictures	6651 Hollywood Boulevard	January 16, 1985
David Niven	Motion pictures	6384 Hollywood Boulevard	February 8, 1960
David Niven	Television	1623 Vine Street	February 8, 1960
Marian Nixon	Motion pictures	1724 Vine Street	February 8, 1960
Lloyd Nolan	Television	1752 Vine Street	February 8, 1960
Nick Nolte	Motion pictures	6433 Hollywood Boulevard	November 20, 2017
Mabel Normand	Motion pictures	6821 Hollywood Boulevard	February 8, 1960
Chuck Norris	Motion pictures	7024 Hollywood Boulevard	December 15, 1989
Kim Novak	Motion pictures	6332 Hollywood Boulevard	February 8, 1960
Ramon Novarro	Motion pictures	6350 Hollywood Boulevard	February 8, 1960
*NSYNC	Recording	7080 Hollywood Boulevard	April 30, 2018
Bill Nye	Television	6357 Hollywood Boulevard	September 22, 2025

== O ==
Name	Category	Address	Date
Jack Oakie	Motion pictures	6752 Hollywood Boulevard	February 8, 1960
Daryl Hall & John Oates	Recording	6752 Hollywood Boulevard	September 2, 2016
Merle Oberon	Motion pictures	6274 Hollywood Boulevard	February 8, 1960
Hugh O' Brian	Television	6613 Hollywood Boulevard	February 8, 1960
Dave O' Brien	Motion pictures	6251 Hollywood Boulevard	February 8, 1960
Edmond O' Brien	Motion pictures	1725 Vine Street	February 8, 1960
Edmond O' Brien	Television	6523 Hollywood Boulevard	February 8, 1960
Eugene O'Brien	Motion pictures	1620 Vine Street	February 8, 1960
George O' Brien	Motion pictures	6201 Hollywood Boulevard	February 8, 1960
Margaret O'Brien	Motion pictures	6606 Hollywood Boulevard	February 8, 1960
Margaret O'Brien	Television	1634 Vine Street	February 8, 1960
Pat O' Brien	Motion pictures	1531 Vine Street	February 8, 1960
Pat O' Brien	Television	6240 Hollywood Boulevard	February 8, 1960
Carroll O'Connor	Television	7080 Hollywood Boulevard	March 17, 2000
Donald O' Connor	Motion pictures	1680 Vine Street	February 8, 1960
Donald O' Connor	Television	7021 Hollywood Boulevard	February 8, 1960
Molly O'Day	Motion pictures	1708 Vine Street	February 8, 1960
Bob Odenkirk	Television	1725 Vine Street	April 18, 2022
Chris O'Donnell	Television	6681 Hollywood Boulevard	March 5, 2015
George O' Hanlon	Motion pictures	6428 Hollywood Boulevard	February 8, 1960
Maureen O'Hara	Motion pictures	7004 Hollywood Boulevard	February 8, 1960

Name	Category	Address	Date
Walter O'Keefe	Radio	6153 Hollywood Boulevard	February 8, 1960
Edna May Oliver	Motion pictures	1623 Vine Street	February 8, 1960
Laurence Olivier	Motion pictures	6319 Hollywood Boulevard	February 8, 1960
Edward James Olmos	Motion pictures	7021 Hollywood Boulevard	February 24, 1992
Mary-Kate & Ashley Olsen	Television	6801 Hollywood Boulevard	April 29, 2004
Ryan O'Neal	Motion pictures	7057 Hollywood Boulevard	February 12, 2021
Ed O'Neill	Television	7021 Hollywood Boulevard	August 30, 2011
Henry O'Neil (Note: Henry O'Neill's star is misspelled as "O'Neil".)	Motion pictures	6801 Hollywood Boulevard	December 31, 1969
Roy Orbison	Recording	1750 Vine Street	January 29, 2010
Tony Orlando	Recording	6385 Hollywood Boulevard	March 21, 1990
Eugene Ormandy	Recording	6926 Hollywood Boulevard	February 8, 1960
Kenny Ortega	Motion pictures	6243 Hollywood Boulevard	July 24, 2019
Robert Osborne	Television	1617 Vine Street	February 1, 2006
Ozzy Osbourne	Recording	6780 Hollywood Boulevard	April 12, 2002
Michael O' Shea	Television	1680 Vine Street	February 8, 1960
The Osmond Family	Recording	7080 Hollywood Boulevard	August 7, 2003
Maureen O'Sullivan	Motion pictures	6541 Hollywood Boulevard	February 27, 1991
Buck Owens	Recording	6667 Hollywood Boulevard	February 8, 1960
Gary Owens	Radio	6743 Hollywood Boulevard	May 20, 1981
Dr. Mehmet Oz	Television	6201 Hollywood Boulevard	February 11, 2022

== P ==
Name	Category	Address	Date
Jack Paar	Television	6212 Hollywood Boulevard	February 8, 1960
Paderewski	Recording	6284 Hollywood Boulevard	February 8, 1960
Anita Page	Motion pictures	6116 Hollywood Boulevard	February 8, 1960
Patti Page	Recording	6760 Hollywood Boulevard	February 8, 1960
Janis Paige	Motion pictures	6624 Hollywood Boulevard	February 8, 1960
George Pal	Motion pictures	1720 Vine Street	February 8, 1960
Jack Palance	Television	6608 Hollywood Boulevard	February 8, 1960
Eugene Pallette	Motion pictures	6702 Hollywood Boulevard	February 8, 1960
Lilli Palmer	Television	7013 Hollywood Boulevard	February 8, 1960
Gwyneth Paltrow	Motion pictures	6931 Hollywood Boulevard	December 13, 2010
Franklin Pangborn	Motion pictures	1500 Vine Street	February 8, 1960
Eleanor Parker	Motion pictures	6340 Hollywood Boulevard	February 8, 1960
Frank Parker	Radio	6821 Hollywood Boulevard	February 8, 1960
Jean Parker	Motion pictures	6666 Hollywood Boulevard	February 8, 1960
Ray Parker Jr	Recording	7065 Hollywood Boulevard	March 6, 2014
Parkyakarkus	Radio	1708 Vine Street	February 8, 1960
Helen Parrish	Motion pictures	6263 Hollywood Boulevard	February 8, 1960
Jim Parsons	Television	6533 Hollywood Boulevard	March 11, 2015
Louella Parsons	Motion pictures	6418 Hollywood Boulevard	February 8, 1960
Louella Parsons	Radio	6300 Hollywood Boulevard	February 8, 1960
Dolly Parton	Recording	6712 Hollywood Boulevard	June 14, 1984
Joe Pasternak	Motion pictures	1541 Vine Street	April 25, 1984
Mandy Patinkin	Television	6243 Hollywood Boulevard	February 12, 2018
Les Paul & Mary Ford	Recording	1541 Vine Street	February 8, 1960
Sarah Paulson	Television	6533 Hollywood Boulevard	December 2, 2025
Luciano Pavarotti	Live Performance	7065 Hollywood Boulevard	August 24, 2022
Katina Paxinou	Motion pictures	1651 Vine Street	February 8, 1960
John Payne	Motion pictures	6125 Hollywood Boulevard	February 8, 1960
John Payne	Television	6687 Hollywood Boulevard	February 8, 1960
Al Pearce	Radio	6328 Hollywood Boulevard	February 8, 1960
Jack Pearl	Radio	1680 Vine Street	February 8, 1960
Drew Pearson	Radio	6623 Hollywood Boulevard	February 8, 1960
Harold Peary	Radio	1639 Vine Street	February 8, 1960
Harold Peary	Television	1719 Vine Street	February 8, 1960
Gregory Peck	Motion pictures	6100 Hollywood Boulevard	February 8, 1960
Jan Peerce	Recording	1751 Vine Street	February 8, 1960
Holly Robinson Peete	Television	6623 Hollywood Boulevard	June 21, 2022
Penn & Teller	Live performance	7003 Hollywood Boulevard	April 5, 2013
Joe Penner	Radio	1752 Vine Street	February 8, 1960
Pentatonix	Live performance	7080 Hollywood Boulevard	February 21, 2023
George Peppard	Motion pictures	6675 Hollywood Boulevard	July 17, 1985
Anthony Perkins	Television	6801 Hollywood Boulevard	February 8, 1960
Anthony Perkins	Motion pictures	6821 Hollywood Boulevard	February 8, 1960
Gigi Perreau	Television	6212 Hollywood Boulevard	February 8, 1960
Jack Perrin	Motion pictures	1777 Vine Street	February 8, 1960
Tyler Perry	Motion pictures	7024 Hollywood Boulevard	October 1, 2019
Bernadette Peters	Live performance	6706 Hollywood Boulevard	April 23, 1987
Brock Peters	Live performance	7000 Hollywood Boulevard	April 23, 1992
House Peters	Motion pictures	6157 Hollywood Boulevard	February 8, 1960
Jon Peters	Motion pictures	6925 Hollywood Boulevard	May 1, 2007
Susan Peters	Motion pictures	1601 Vine Street	February 8, 1960
William Petersen	Television	6667 Hollywood Boulevard	February 3, 2009
Olga Petrova	Motion pictures	6562 Hollywood Boulevard	February 8, 1960

Name	Category	Address	Date
Tom Petty & the Heartbreakers	Recording	7018 Hollywood Boulevard	April 28, 1999
Michelle Pfeiffer	Motion pictures	6801 Hollywood Boulevard	August 6, 2007
Regis Philbin	Television	6834 Hollywood Boulevard	April 10, 2003
Dorothy Philips (Note: Dorothy Phillips' star is misspelled as "Philips".)	Motion pictures	6358 Hollywood Boulevard	February 8, 1960
Jack Pickford	Motion pictures	1523 Vine Street	February 8, 1960
Mary Pickford	Motion pictures	6280 Hollywood Boulevard	February 8, 1960
Walter Pidgeon	Motion pictures	6414 Hollywood Boulevard	February 8, 1960
Webb Pierce	Recording	1600 Vine Street	February 8, 1960
Pink	Recording	6801 Hollywood Boulevard	February 5, 2019
Ezio Pinza	Recording	1601 Vine Street	February 8, 1960
Pitbull	Recording	6201 Hollywood Boulevard	July 15, 2016
ZaSu Pitts	Motion pictures	6554 Hollywood Boulevard	February 8, 1960
Suzanne Pleshette	Television	6751 Hollywood Boulevard	January 31, 2008
Amy Poehler	Television	6767 Hollywood Boulevard	December 3, 2015
The Pointer Sisters	Recording	6363 Hollywood Boulevard	September 29, 1994
Sidney Poitier	Motion pictures	7065 Hollywood Boulevard	February 1, 1994
Snub Pollard	Motion pictures	6415 Hollywood Boulevard	February 8, 1960
Ellen Pompeo	Television	6533 Hollywood Boulevard	April 29, 2025
Lily Pons	Recording	7006 Hollywood Boulevard	February 8, 1960
Winnie the Pooh	Motion pictures	6834 Hollywood Boulevard	April 11, 2006
Billy Porter	Live performance	6201 Hollywood Boulevard	December 1, 2022
Cole Porter	Recording	7080 Hollywood Boulevard	May 21, 2007
H.C. Potter	Motion pictures	6633 Hollywood Boulevard	February 8, 1960
David Powell	Motion pictures	1651 Vine Street	February 8, 1960
Dick Powell	Motion pictures	6915 Hollywood Boulevard	February 8, 1960
Dick Powell	Television	6745 Hollywood Boulevard	February 8, 1960
Dick Powell	Radio	1560 Vine Street	February 8, 1960
Eleanor Powell	Motion pictures	1541 Vine Street	February 15, 1984
Jane Powell	Motion pictures	6818 Hollywood Boulevard	February 8, 1960
William Powell	Motion pictures	1636 Vine Street	February 8, 1960
Tyrone Power	Motion pictures	6747 Hollywood Boulevard	February 8, 1960
Mala Powers	Television	6360 Hollywood Boulevard	February 8, 1960
Stefanie Powers	Television	6776 Hollywood Boulevard	November 25, 1992
Perez Prado	Recording	1529 Vine Street	February 8, 1960
Chris Pratt	Motion pictures	6834 Hollywood Boulevard	April 21, 2017
Otto Preminger	Motion pictures	6624 Hollywood Boulevard	February 8, 1960
Elvis Presley	Recording	6777 Hollywood Boulevard	February 8, 1960
Marie Prevost	Motion pictures	6201 Hollywood Boulevard	February 8, 1960
Vincent Price	Motion pictures	6201 Hollywood Boulevard	February 8, 1960
Vincent Price	Television	6501 Hollywood Boulevard	February 8, 1960
Charley Pride	Recording	7083 Hollywood Boulevard	July 21, 1999
Louis Prima	Recording	1617 Vine Street	July 25, 2010
William Primrose	Recording	6801 Hollywood Boulevard	February 8, 1960
Aileen Pringle	Motion pictures	6723 Hollywood Boulevard	February 8, 1960
Freddie Prinze	Television	6755 Hollywood Boulevard	December 14, 2004
Jon Provost	Television	7080 Hollywood Boulevard	February 1, 1994
Richard Pryor	Motion pictures	6438 Hollywood Boulevard	May 20, 1993
Wolfgang Puck	Television	6801 Hollywood Boulevard	April 26, 2017
Tito Puente	Recording	6933 Hollywood Boulevard	August 14, 1990
George Putnam	Television	6374 Hollywood Boulevard	April 21, 1982
Denver Pyle	Motion pictures	7083 Hollywood Boulevard	December 12, 1997

== Q ==
Name	Category	Address	Date
Dennis Quaid	Motion pictures	7018 Hollywood Boulevard	November 16, 2005
Randy Quaid	Motion pictures	7000 Hollywood Boulevard	October 7, 2003
Queen	Recording	6356 Hollywood Boulevard	October 18, 2002
Anthony Quinn	Motion pictures	6251 Hollywood Boulevard	February 8, 1960
Selena Quintanilla	Recording	1750 Vine Street	November 3, 2017

== R ==
Name	Category	Address	Date
Daniel Radcliffe	Motion pictures	6801 Hollywood Boulevard	November 12, 2015
Gilda Radner	Television	6801 Hollywood Boulevard	June 27, 2003
George Raft	Motion pictures	6159 Hollywood Boulevard	February 8, 1960
George Raft	Television	1500 Vine Street	February 8, 1960
Luise Rainer	Motion pictures	6300 Hollywood Boulevard	February 8, 1960
Ella Raines	Motion pictures	7021 Hollywood Boulevard	February 8, 1960
Ella Raines	Television	6600 Hollywood Boulevard	February 8, 1960
Claude Rains	Motion pictures	6400 Hollywood Boulevard	February 8, 1960
Bonnie Raitt	Recording	1750 Vine Street	March 19, 2002
John Raitt	Live performance	6126 Hollywood Boulevard	January 29, 1992
Sheryl Lee Ralph	Television	6623 Hollywood Boulevard	April 16, 2025
Esther Ralston	Motion pictures	6664 Hollywood Boulevard	February 8, 1960
Vera Ralston	Motion pictures	1752 Vine Street	February 8, 1960
Carlo Rambaldi	Motion pictures	1611 Vine Street	October 15, 2026
Marjorie Rambeau	Motion pictures	6336 Hollywood Boulevard	February 8, 1960
Gordon Ramsay	Television	6201 Hollywood Boulevard	November 18, 2026
Rascal Flatts	Recording	6664 Hollywood Boulevard	September 7, 2012
Basil Rathbone	Motion pictures	6549 Hollywood Boulevard	February 8, 1960
Basil Rathbone	Radio	6300 Hollywood Boulevard	February 8, 1960
Basil Rathbone	Television	6915 Hollywood Boulevard	February 8, 1960
Brett Ratner	Motion pictures	6801 Hollywood Boulevard	January 19, 2017
Gregory Ratoff	Motion pictures	6100 Hollywood Boulevard	February 8, 1960
Herbert Rawlinson	Motion pictures	6150 Hollywood Boulevard	February 8, 1960
Lou Rawls	Recording	6931 Hollywood Boulevard	December 15, 1982
Charles Ray	Motion pictures	6355 Hollywood Boulevard	February 8, 1960
Johnnie Ray	Recording	6201 Hollywood Boulevard	February 8, 1960
Martha Raye	Motion pictures	6251 Hollywood Boulevard	February 8, 1960
Martha Raye	Television	6547 Hollywood Boulevard	February 8, 1960
Gene Raymond	Motion pictures	7001 Hollywood Boulevard	February 8, 1960
Gene Raymond	Television	1708 Vine Street	February 8, 1960
Ronald Reagan	Television	6374 Hollywood Boulevard	February 8, 1960
The Recording Academy	Special	7016 Hollywood Boulevard	November 29, 2007
Red Hot Chili Peppers	Recording	6212 Hollywood Boulevard	March 31, 2022
Otis Redding	Live performance	6150 Hollywood Boulevard	October 4, 2024
Helen Reddy	Recording	1750 Vine Street	July 23, 1974
Sumner Redstone	Motion pictures	7000 Hollywood Boulevard	March 30, 2012
Donna Reed	Motion pictures	1612 Vine Street	February 8, 1960
Norman Reedus	Television	6600 Hollywood Boulevard	September 27, 2022
Della Reese	Television	7060 Hollywood Boulevard	July 12, 1994
Christopher Reeve	Motion pictures	7021 Hollywood Boulevard	April 15, 1997
George Reeves	Television	6709 Hollywood Boulevard	February 8, 1960
Keanu Reeves	Motion pictures	6801 Hollywood Boulevard	January 31, 2005
Martha Reeves	Recording	7080 Hollywood Boulevard	March 27, 2024
Wallace Reid	Motion pictures	6617 Hollywood Boulevard	February 8, 1960
Carl Reiner	Television	6421 Hollywood Boulevard	February 8, 1960
Rob Reiner	Motion pictures	6421 Hollywood Boulevard	October 12, 1999
Irving Reis	Motion pictures	6912 Hollywood Boulevard	February 8, 1960
Ivan Reitman	Motion pictures	7024 Hollywood Boulevard	May 5, 1997
Lee Remick	Motion pictures	6104 Hollywood Boulevard	April 29, 1991
Duncan Renaldo	Television	1680 Vine Street	February 8, 1960
Henri Rene	Recording	1610 Vine Street	February 8, 1960
Ray Rennahan	Motion pictures	6916 Hollywood Boulevard	October 11, 1978
Jean Renoir	Motion pictures	6212 Hollywood Boulevard	February 8, 1960
Burt Reynolds	Motion pictures	6838 Hollywood Boulevard	March 15, 1978
Debbie Reynolds	Motion pictures	6654 Hollywood Boulevard	February 8, 1960
Debbie Reynolds	Live performance	7021 Hollywood Boulevard	February 15, 1984
Marjorie Reynolds	Television	1525 Vine Street	February 8, 1960
Quentin Reynolds	Radio	6225 Hollywood Boulevard	February 8, 1960
Ryan Reynolds	Motion pictures	6801 Hollywood Boulevard	December 15, 2016
Busta Rhymes	Recording	6201 Hollywood Boulevard	August 1, 2025
Christina Ricci	Motion pictures	6258 Hollywood Boulevard	March 6, 2025
Grantland Rice	Radio	1632 Vine Street	February 8, 1960
Tim Rice	Live performance	6243 Hollywood Boulevard	November 20, 2008
Irene Rich	Motion pictures	6225 Hollywood Boulevard	February 8, 1960
Irene Rich	Radio	6150 Hollywood Boulevard	February 8, 1960
Little Richard	Recording	6840 Hollywood Boulevard	June 21, 1990
Lionel Richie	Recording	7018 Hollywood Boulevard	June 20, 2003
Don Rickles	Live performance	6834 Hollywood Boulevard	October 17, 2000
Nelson Riddle	Recording	6724 Hollywood Boulevard	February 8, 1960
Tommy Riggs & Betty Lou	Radio	6164 Hollywood Boulevard	February 8, 1960
Teddy Riley	Recording	6405 Hollywood Boulevard	August 16, 2019
Rin Tin Tin	Motion pictures	1623 Vine Street	February 8, 1960
Kelly Ripa	Television	6834 Hollywood Boulevard	October 12, 2015
Robert Ripley	Radio	6400 Hollywood Boulevard	February 8, 1960
John Ritter	Television	6631 Hollywood Boulevard	September 28, 1983

Name	Category	Address	Date
Tex Ritter	Recording	6631 Hollywood Boulevard	February 8, 1960
The Ritz Brothers	Motion pictures	6756 Hollywood Boulevard	November 17, 1987
Jenni Rivera	Recording	1750 N. Vine Street	June 27, 2024
Joan Rivers	Television	7000 Hollywood Boulevard	July 26, 1989
Hal Roach	Motion pictures	1654 Vine Street	February 8, 1960
Gale Robbins	Television	6500 Hollywood Boulevard	February 8, 1960
Harold Robbins	Motion pictures	6743 Hollywood Boulevard	December 14, 1977
Marty Robbins	Recording	6666 Hollywood Boulevard	February 8, 1960
Tim Robbins	Motion pictures	6801 Hollywood Boulevard	October 10, 2008
Doris Roberts	Live performance	7021 Hollywood Boulevard	February 10, 2003
Robin Roberts	Television	6920 Hollywood Boulevard	November 5, 2026
Theodore Roberts	Motion pictures	6166 Hollywood Boulevard	February 8, 1960
Cliff Robertson	Motion pictures	6801 Hollywood Boulevard	December 17, 1986
Dale Robertson	Television	6500 Hollywood Boulevard	February 8, 1960
Paul Robeson	Motion pictures	6660 Hollywood Boulevard	April 9, 1978
Edward G. Robinson	Motion pictures	6235 Hollywood Boulevard	February 8, 1960
Smokey Robinson	Recording	1500 Vine Street	February 22, 1983
Mark Robson	Motion pictures	1720 Vine Street	February 8, 1960
Chris Rock	Motion pictures	7021 Hollywood Boulevard	March 12, 2003
Gene Roddenberry	Television	6683 Hollywood Boulevard	September 4, 1985
Buddy Rogers	Motion pictures	6135 Hollywood Boulevard	February 8, 1960
Ginger Rogers	Motion pictures	6772 Hollywood Boulevard	February 8, 1960
Kenny Rogers	Recording	6666 Hollywood Boulevard	September 14, 1979
Mister Rogers	Television	6600 Hollywood Boulevard	June 9, 1998
Roy Rogers	Motion pictures	1752 Vine Street	February 8, 1960
Roy Rogers	Radio	1733 Vine Street	February 8, 1960
Roy Rogers	Television	1620 Vine Street	February 8, 1960
Wayne Rogers	Television	7018 Hollywood Boulevard	December 13, 2005
Will Rogers	Motion pictures	6401 Hollywood Boulevard	February 8, 1960
Will Rogers	Radio	6608 Hollywood Boulevard	February 8, 1960
Gilbert Roland	Motion pictures	6730 Hollywood Boulevard	February 8, 1960
Ruth Roland	Motion pictures	6260 Hollywood Boulevard	February 8, 1960
Ruth Roman	Television	6672 Hollywood Boulevard	February 8, 1960
Cesar Romero	Motion pictures	6615 Hollywood Boulevard	February 8, 1960
Cesar Romero	Television	1719 Vine Street	February 8, 1960
George A Romero	Motion pictures	6604 Hollywood Boulevard	October 25, 2017
Jan & Mickey Rooney	Live performance	6801 Hollywood Boulevard	April 26, 2004
Mickey Rooney	Motion pictures	1718 Vine Street	February 8, 1960
Mickey Rooney	Radio	6372 Hollywood Boulevard	February 8, 1960
Mickey Rooney	Television	6541 Hollywood Boulevard	February 8, 1960
Mickey Rooney	Live performance	6211 Hollywood Boulevard	April 26, 2004
David Rose	Recording	6514 Hollywood Boulevard	February 8, 1960
Roseanne	Television	6767 Hollywood Boulevard	September 25, 1992
Diana Ross	Recording	6712 Hollywood Boulevard	May 6, 1982
Lanny Ross	Radio	6777 Hollywood Boulevard	February 8, 1960
Marion Ross	Television	6420 Hollywood Boulevard	July 12, 2001
Robert Rossen	Motion pictures	6821 Hollywood Boulevard	February 8, 1960
Lillian Roth	Motion pictures	6330 Hollywood Boulevard	February 8, 1960
Peter Roth	Television	6918 Hollywood Boulevard	October 14, 2021
Rowan & Martin	Television	7080 Hollywood Boulevard	April 2, 2002
Henry Rowland	Television	6328 Hollywood Boulevard	February 8, 1960
Richard Rowland	Motion pictures	1549 Vine Street	February 8, 1960
Siegfried & Roy	Live performance	7060 Hollywood Boulevard	September 23, 1999
Alma Rubens	Motion pictures	6409 Hollywood Boulevard	February 8, 1960
Arthur Rubinstein	Recording	1737 Vine Street	February 8, 1960
Darius Rucker	Recording	7065 Hollywood Boulevard	December 4, 2023
Paul Rudd	Motion pictures	6834 Hollywood Boulevard	July 1, 2015
Evelyn Rudie	Television	6800 Hollywood Boulevard	February 8, 1960
Mark Ruffalo	Motion pictures	6777 Hollywood Boulevard	February 8, 2024
Charles Ruggles	Motion pictures	6264 Hollywood Boulevard	February 8, 1960
Charles Ruggles	Radio	6359 Hollywood Boulevard	February 8, 1960
Charles Ruggles	Television	1630 Vine Street	February 8, 1960
Wesley Ruggles	Motion pictures	6424 Hollywood Boulevard	February 8, 1960
Rugrats	Television	6600 Hollywood Boulevard	June 28, 2001
RuPaul	Television	6652 Hollywood Boulevard	March 16, 2018
Rush	Recording	6752 Hollywood Boulevard	June 25, 2010
Gail Russell	Motion pictures	6933 Hollywood Boulevard	February 8, 1960
Harold Russell	Motion pictures	6752 Hollywood Boulevard	February 8, 1960
Jane Russell	Motion pictures	6850 Hollywood Boulevard	February 8, 1960
Keri Russell	Television	6356 Hollywood Boulevard	May 30, 2017
Kurt Russell	Motion pictures	6201 Hollywood Boulevard	May 4, 2017
Rosalind Russell	Motion pictures	1708 Vine Street	February 8, 1960
Ann Rutherford	Television	6333 Hollywood Boulevard	February 8, 1960
Ann Rutherford	Motion pictures	6834 Hollywood Boulevard	February 8, 1960
Winona Ryder	Motion pictures	7018 Hollywood Boulevard	October 6, 2000

== S ==
Name	Category	Address	Date
Haim Saban	Television	6712 Hollywood Boulevard	March 22, 2017
Sabu	Motion pictures	6251 Hollywood Boulevard	February 8, 1960
Katey Sagal	Television	7021 Hollywood Boulevard	September 9, 2014
Carole Bayer Sager	Recording	7021 Hollywood Boulevard	February 14, 2000
Eva Marie Saint	Television	6730 Hollywood Boulevard	February 8, 1960
Eva Marie Saint	Motion pictures	6624 Hollywood Boulevard	February 8, 1960
Susan Saint James	Television	1645 Vine Street	June 11, 2008
Al St. John	Motion pictures	6313 Hollywood Boulevard	February 8, 1960
Adela Rogers St. Johns	Motion pictures	6424 Hollywood Boulevard	February 8, 1960
Pat Sajak	Television	6200 Hollywood Boulevard	February 10, 1994
Zoe Saldana	Motion pictures	6920 Hollywood Boulevard	May 3, 2018
Soupy Sales	Television	7000 Hollywood Boulevard	January 7, 2005
Lea Salonga	Live performance	6225 Hollywood Boulevard	September 4, 2026
Salt-N-Pepa	Recording	6212 Hollywood Boulevard	November 4, 2022
George Sanders	Motion pictures	1636 Vine Street	February 8, 1960
George Sanders	Television	7007 Hollywood Boulevard	February 8, 1960
Julia Sanderson	Radio	1620 Vine Street	February 8, 1960
Adam Sandler	Motion pictures	6262 Hollywood Boulevard	February 1, 2011
Mark Sandrich	Motion pictures	1719 Vine Street	February 8, 1960
Tommy Sands	Recording	1560 Vine Street	February 8, 1960
Isabel Sanford	Television	7080 Hollywood Boulevard	January 15, 2004
Carlos Santana	Recording	7080 Hollywood Boulevard	August 17, 1998
Alejandro Sanz	Recording	1750 Vine Street	October 1, 2021
Cristina Saralegui	Television	7060 Hollywood Boulevard	November 4, 1999
Susan Sarandon	Motion pictures	6801 Hollywood Boulevard	August 5, 2002
Telly Savalas	Motion pictures	6801 Hollywood Boulevard	October 26, 1983
Joseph Schenck	Motion pictures	6757 Hollywood Boulevard	February 8, 1960
Victor Schertzinger	Motion pictures	1611 Vine Street	February 8, 1960
Lalo Schifrin	Recording	7000 Hollywood Boulevard	June 21, 1988
Joseph Schildkraut	Motion pictures	6780 Hollywood Boulevard	February 8, 1960
George Schlatter	Television	7000 Hollywood Boulevard	January 31, 1988
Al Schmitt	Recording	1750 Vine Street	August 13, 2015
Ernest Shoedsach (Note: Ernest Schoedsack's star is misspelled as "Shoedsach".)	Motion pictures	6270 Hollywood Boulevard	February 8, 1960
B. P. Schulberg	Motion pictures	1500 Vine Street	February 8, 1960
Charles M Schulz	Television	7021 Hollywood Boulevard	June 28, 1996
Schumann–Heink	Recording	6640 Hollywood Boulevard	December 31, 1969
Michael Schur	Television	6150 Hollywood Boulevard	May 21, 2025
Sherwood Schwartz	Television	6541 Hollywood Boulevard	March 7, 2008
Stephen Schwartz	Live performance	6233 Hollywood Boulevard	April 8, 2008
Arnold Schwarzenegger	Motion pictures	6764 Hollywood Boulevard	June 2, 1987
Martin Scorsese	Motion pictures	6801 Hollywood Boulevard	February 28, 2003
Lizabeth Scott	Motion pictures	1624 Vine Street	February 8, 1960
Martha Scott	Live performance	6126 Hollywood Boulevard	April 23, 1993
Randolph Scott	Motion pictures	6243 Hollywood Boulevard	February 8, 1960
Ridley Scott	Motion pictures	6712 Hollywood Boulevard	January 5, 2015
Zachary Scott	Motion pictures	6349 Hollywood Boulevard	February 8, 1960
Screen Actors Guild	Special	7020 Hollywood Boulevard	October 25, 2007
Earl Scruggs	Recording	7021 Hollywood Boulevard	February 13, 2003
Vin Scully	Radio	6675 Hollywood Boulevard	June 9, 1982
Ryan Seacrest	Radio	6801 Hollywood Boulevard	April 20, 2005
George Seaton	Motion pictures	1752 Vine Street	February 8, 1960
Dorothy Sebastian	Motion pictures	6655 Hollywood Boulevard	February 8, 1960
Neil Sedaka	Recording	Sunset & Vine	January 18, 1978
Edward Sedgwick	Motion pictures	6801 Hollywood Boulevard	August 15, 1958
Kyra Sedgwick	Television	6356 Hollywood Boulevard	June 8, 2009
George Segal	Television	6433 Hollywood Boulevard	February 14, 2017
Bob Seger & The; Silver Bullet Band	Recording	1750 Vine Street	March 13, 1987
William Seiter	Motion pictures	6240 Hollywood Boulevard	February 8, 1960
William N Selig	Motion pictures	6116 Hollywood Boulevard	February 8, 1960
Tom Selleck	Motion pictures	6925 Hollywood Boulevard	June 4, 1986
David O Selznick	Motion pictures	7000 Hollywood Boulevard	October 26, 2004
Lewis J. Selznick	Motion pictures	6412 Hollywood Boulevard	February 8, 1960
Larry Semon	Motion pictures	6933 Hollywood Boulevard	February 8, 1960
Mack Sennett	Motion pictures	6710 Hollywood Boulevard	February 8, 1960
Rudolf Serkin	Recording	1751 Vine Street	February 8, 1960
Rod Serling	Television	6840 Hollywood Boulevard	October 6, 1988
Mark Serrurier; Moviola	Motion pictures	6667 Hollywood Boulevard	March 24, 1982
Dr. Seuss	Motion pictures	6600 Hollywood Boulevard	March 11, 2004
Jane Seymour	Television	7000 Hollywood Boulevard	April 10, 1999
Shakira	Recording	6270 Hollywood Boulevard	November 8, 2011
Tupac Shakur	Recording	6212 Hollywood Boulevard	June 7, 2023
Leon Shamroy	Motion pictures	6925 Hollywood Boulevard	February 8, 1960
Molly Shannon	Television	6765 Hollywood Boulevard	June 22, 2026
William Shatner	Television	6901 Hollywood Boulevard	May 19, 1983
Artie Shaw	Recording	1709 Vine Street	February 8, 1960
Robert Shaw	Recording	1559 Vine Street	February 8, 1960
Norma Shearer	Motion pictures	6636 Hollywood Boulevard	February 8, 1960
George Shearing	Recording	1716 Vine Street	February 8, 1960
Charlie Sheen	Motion pictures	7021 Hollywood Boulevard	September 23, 1994
Martin Sheen	Motion pictures	1500 Vine Street	August 25, 1989
Judge Judy Sheindlin	Television	7065 Hollywood Boulevard	February 14, 2006
Sidney Sheldon	Television	6739 Hollywood Boulevard	June 9, 1998
Blake Shelton	Recording	6212 Hollywood Boulevard	May 12, 2023
Cybill Shepherd	Television	7000 Hollywood Boulevard	January 21, 1988
Sherri Shepherd	Television	6258 Hollywood Boulevard	November 3, 2025
Tom Sherak	Motion pictures	6910 Hollywood Boulevard	February 14, 2014
Ann Sheridan	Motion pictures	7024 Hollywood Boulevard	February 8, 1960
Richard & Robert; Sherman	Motion pictures	6918 Hollywood Boulevard	November 17, 1976
Bobby Sherwood	Television	1625 Vine Street	February 8, 1960
Anne Shirley	Motion pictures	7018 Hollywood Boulevard	February 8, 1960
Dinah Shore	Radio	1751 Vine Street	February 8, 1960
Dinah Shore	Recording	6901 Hollywood Boulevard	February 8, 1960
Dinah Shore	Television	6916 Hollywood Boulevard	February 8, 1960
Shrek	Motion pictures	6931 Hollywood Boulevard	May 20, 2010
George Sidney	Motion pictures	6307 Hollywood Boulevard	February 8, 1960
Sylvia Sidney	Motion pictures	6245 Hollywood Boulevard	February 8, 1960
Siegfried & Roy	Live performance	7060 Hollywood Boulevard	September 23, 1999
Beverly Sills	Recording	1750 Vine Street	October 5, 1977
Milton Sills	Motion pictures	6263 Hollywood Boulevard	February 8, 1960
Joel Silver	Motion pictures	6925 Hollywood Boulevard	October 7, 1993
Jay Silverheels	Television	6538 Hollywood Boulevard	July 19, 1979
Sarah Silverman	Television	6000 Hollywood Boulevard	November 9, 2018
Phil Silvers	Television	6370 Hollywood Boulevard	November 1, 2000
Ginny Simms	Radio	6408 Hollywood Boulevard	February 8, 1960
The Simpsons	Television	7021 Hollywood Boulevard	January 14, 2000
Frank Sinatra	Motion pictures	1600 Vine Street	February 8, 1960
Frank Sinatra	Recording	1637 Vine Street	February 8, 1960
Frank Sinatra	Television	6538 Hollywood Boulevard	February 8, 1960
Nancy Sinatra	Recording	7000 Hollywood Boulevard	May 11, 2006
John Singleton	Motion pictures	6915 Hollywood Boulevard	August 26, 2003
Penny Singleton	Motion pictures	6547 Hollywood Boulevard	February 8, 1960
Penny Singleton	Radio	6811 Hollywood Boulevard	February 8, 1960
Gary Sinise	Television	6664 Hollywood Boulevard	April 17, 2017
Red Skelton	Radio	6763 Hollywood Boulevard	February 8, 1960
Red Skelton	Television	6650 Hollywood Boulevard	February 8, 1960
Slash	Recording	6901 Hollywood Boulevard	July 10, 2012
Christian Slater	Television	6201 Hollywood Boulevard	June 9, 2025
Everett Sloane	Television	6254 Hollywood Boulevard	February 8, 1960

Name	Category	Address	Date
Edward Small	Motion pictures	1501 Vine Street	February 8, 1960
Jean Smart	Television	6150 Hollywood Boulevard	April 25, 2022
Tavis Smiley	Television	6270 Hollywood Boulevard	April 24, 2014
C. Aubrey Smith	Motion pictures	6327 Hollywood Boulevard	February 8, 1960
Carl Smith	Recording	1517 Vine Street	February 8, 1960
Jack Smith	Radio	6145 Hollywood Boulevard	February 8, 1960
Jaclyn Smith	Television	7000 Hollywood Boulevard	November 6, 1989
Joe Smith	Recording	1750 Vine Street	August 27, 2015
Kate Smith	Recording	6157 Hollywood Boulevard	February 8, 1960
Kate Smith	Radio	6145 Hollywood Boulevard	February 8, 1960
Keely Smith	Recording	7080 Hollywood Boulevard	September 22, 1998
Pete Smith	Motion pictures	1621 Vine Street	February 8, 1960
Jimmy Smits	Motion pictures	6100 Hollywood Boulevard	June 2, 2021
The; Smothers Brothers	Television	6555 Hollywood Boulevard	November 2, 1989
Wesley Snipes	Motion pictures	7018 Hollywood Boulevard	August 21, 1998
Snoop Dogg	Recording	6840 Hollywood Boulevard	November 19, 2018
Snoopy	Motion pictures	7021 Hollywood Boulevard	November 2, 2015
Snow White	Motion pictures	6910 Hollywood Boulevard	June 28, 1987
Marco Antonio Solis	Recording	6931 Hollywood Boulevard	August 5, 2010
Suzanne Somers	Television	7018 Hollywood Boulevard	January 24, 2003
Sonny & Cher	Television	7018 Hollywood Boulevard	May 15, 1998
Sons of the Pioneers	Recording	6845 Hollywood Boulevard	September 24, 1976
Ann Sothern	Motion pictures	1612 Vine Street	February 8, 1960
Ann Sothern	Television	1634 Vine Street	February 8, 1960
John Philip Sousa	Recording	1500 Vine Street	June 14, 1990
Sissy Spacek	Motion pictures	6834 Hollywood Boulevard	August 1, 2011
Kevin Spacey	Motion pictures	6801 Hollywood Boulevard	October 5, 1999
David Spade	Motion pictures	7018 Hollywood Boulevard	September 5, 2003
Britney Spears	Recording	6801 Hollywood Boulevard	November 17, 2003
Aaron Spelling	Television	6667 Hollywood Boulevard	September 15, 1978
Octavia Spencer	Motion pictures	6623 Hollywood Boulevard	December 8, 2022
Arthur Spiegel	Motion pictures	1680 Vine Street	February 8, 1960
Steven Spielberg	Motion pictures	6801 Hollywood Boulevard	January 10, 2003
The Spinners	Recording	6723 Hollywood Boulevard	June 30, 1976
Phil Spitalny	Radio	6364 Hollywood Boulevard	February 8, 1960
Rick Springfield	Recording	7060 Hollywood Boulevard	May 9, 2014
Robert Stack	Motion pictures	7001 Hollywood Boulevard	February 8, 1960
Hanley Stafford	Radio	1640 Vine Street	February 8, 1960
Jo Stafford	Radio	1709 Vine Street	February 8, 1960
Jo Stafford	Recording	1625 Vine Street	February 8, 1960
Jo Stafford	Television	6270 Hollywood Boulevard	February 8, 1960
John Stahl	Motion pictures	6546 Hollywood Boulevard	February 8, 1960
Sylvester Stallone	Motion pictures	6712 Hollywood Boulevard	June 14, 1984
Susan Stamberg	Radio	6363 Hollywood Boulevard	March 8, 2020
John Stamos	Television	7021 Hollywood Boulevard	November 16, 2009
Barbara Stanwyck	Motion pictures	1751 Vine Street	February 8, 1960
Pauline Starke	Motion pictures	6125 Hollywood Boulevard	February 8, 1960
Kay Starr	Recording	1716 Vine Street	February 8, 1960
Ringo Starr	Recording	1750 Vine Street	February 8, 2010
Ralph Staub	Motion pictures	1752 Vine Street	February 8, 1960
Eleanor Steber	Recording	1708 Vine Street	February 8, 1960
The Real Don Steele	Radio	7080 Hollywood Boulevard	May 3, 1995
Mary Steenburgen	Motion pictures	7021 Hollywood Boulevard	December 16, 2009
Gwen Stefani	Recording	6212 Hollywood Boulevard	October 19, 2023
Rod Steiger	Motion pictures	7080 Hollywood Boulevard	April 10, 1997
Jules C. Stein	Motion pictures	6821 Hollywood Boulevard	February 8, 1960
William Steinberg	Recording	1645 Vine Street	February 8, 1960
Max Steiner	Motion pictures	1559 Vine Street	December 30, 1975
George Stephanopoulos	Television	6920 Hollywood Boulevard	November 5, 2026
Ford Sterling	Motion pictures	6612 Hollywood Boulevard	February 8, 1960
Jan Sterling	Motion pictures	6638 Hollywood Boulevard	February 8, 1960
Robert Sterling	Television	1709 Vine Street	February 8, 1960
Bill Stern	Radio	6821 Hollywood Boulevard	February 8, 1960
Isaac Stern	Recording	6540 Hollywood Boulevard	February 8, 1960
The; Steve Miller Band	Recording	1750 Vine Street	July 14, 1987
Connie Stevens	Television	6249 Hollywood Boulevard	March 16, 1998
George Stevens	Motion pictures	1709 Vine Street	February 8, 1960
Mark Stevens	Television	6637 Hollywood Boulevard	February 8, 1960
Onslow Stevens	Motion pictures	6349 Hollywood Boulevard	February 8, 1960
Anita Stewart	Motion pictures	6724 Hollywood Boulevard	February 8, 1960
James Stewart	Motion pictures	1708 Vine Street	June 28, 1987
Patrick Stewart	Live performance	7021 Hollywood Boulevard	December 16, 1996
Rod Stewart	Recording	6801 Hollywood Boulevard	October 11, 2005
Jerry Stiller; Anne Meara	Television	7018 Hollywood Boulevard	February 9, 2007
Mauritz Stiller	Motion pictures	1713 Vine Street	April 14, 1988
Crosby, Stills & Nash	Recording	6666 Hollywood Boulevard	June 21, 1978
Sting	Recording	6834 Hollywood Boulevard	December 8, 2000
Frederick Stock	Recording	1547 Vine Street	February 8, 1960
Dean Stockwell	Motion pictures	7000 Hollywood Boulevard	February 29, 1992
Leopold Stokowski	Recording	1600 Vine Street	February 8, 1960
Morris Stoloff	Recording	6702 Hollywood Boulevard	February 8, 1960
Andrew L. Stone	Motion pictures	6777 Hollywood Boulevard	February 8, 1960
Cliffie Stone	Radio	1501 Vine Street	March 1, 1989
Ezra Stone	Radio	1634 Vine Street	February 8, 1960
Fred Stone	Motion pictures	1634 Vine Street	February 8, 1960
George E Stone	Motion pictures	6932 Hollywood Boulevard	February 8, 1960
Lewis Stone	Motion pictures	6526 Hollywood Boulevard	February 8, 1960
Milburn Stone	Motion pictures	6823 Hollywood Boulevard	December 31, 1969
Oliver Stone	Motion pictures	7013 Hollywood Boulevard	March 15, 1996
Sharon Stone	Motion pictures	6925 Hollywood Boulevard	November 16, 1995
Edith Storey	Motion pictures	1523 Vine Street	February 8, 1960
Gale Storm	Radio	6119 Hollywood Boulevard	February 8, 1960
Gale Storm	Recording	1519 Vine Street	February 8, 1960
Gale Storm	Television	1680 Vine Street	February 8, 1960
Bill Stout	Television	1500 Vine Street	February 3, 1988
Michael Strahan	Sports entertainment	6918 Hollywood Boulevard	January 23, 2023
Lee Strasberg	Motion pictures	6757 Hollywood Boulevard	November 27, 1977
Igor Stravinsky	Radio	6340 Hollywood Boulevard	February 8, 1960
Meryl Streep	Motion pictures	7018 Hollywood Boulevard	September 16, 1998
Barbra Streisand	Motion pictures	6925 Hollywood Boulevard	December 17, 1976
Strongheart	Motion pictures	1724 Vine Street	February 8, 1960
Gloria Stuart	Motion pictures	6714 Hollywood Boulevard	September 27, 2000
John Sturges	Motion pictures	6511 Hollywood Boulevard	February 8, 1960
Preston Sturges	Motion pictures	1601 Vine Street	February 8, 1960
Margaret Sullavan	Motion pictures	1751 Vine Street	February 8, 1960
Barry Sullivan	Motion pictures	6160 Hollywood Boulevard	February 8, 1960
Barry Sullivan	Television	1500 Vine Street	February 8, 1960
Ed Sullivan	Television	6101 Hollywood Boulevard	February 8, 1960
Yma Sumac	Recording	6445 Hollywood Boulevard	February 8, 1960
Donna Summer	Recording	7000 Hollywood Boulevard	March 18, 1992
Slim Summerville	Motion pictures	6409 Hollywood Boulevard	February 8, 1960
The Supremes	Recording	7060 Hollywood Boulevard	March 11, 1994
Donald Sutherland	Motion pictures	7024 Hollywood Boulevard	January 26, 2011
Kiefer Sutherland	Television	7024 Hollywood Boulevard	December 9, 2008
Mack Swain	Motion pictures	1500 Vine Street	February 8, 1960
Hilary Swank	Motion pictures	6925 Hollywood Boulevard	January 8, 2007
Gloria Swanson	Television	6301 Hollywood Boulevard	February 8, 1960
Gloria Swanson	Motion pictures	6750 Hollywood Boulevard	February 8, 1960
Gladys Swarthout	Recording	6290 Hollywood Boulevard	February 8, 1960
Patrick Swayze	Motion pictures	7021 Hollywood Boulevard	August 18, 1997
Blanche Sweet	Motion pictures	1751 Vine Street	February 8, 1960
Loretta Swit	Television	6240 Hollywood Boulevard	August 1, 1989
Joseph Szigeti	Recording	6600 Hollywood Boulevard	February 8, 1960

== T ==
Name	Category	Address	Date
George Takei	Television	6681 Hollywood Boulevard	October 30, 1986
Mabel Taliaferro	Motion pictures	6720 Hollywood Boulevard	February 8, 1960
Constance Talmadge	Motion pictures	6300 Hollywood Boulevard	February 8, 1960
Norma Talmadge	Motion pictures	1500 Vine Street	February 8, 1960
Jeffrey Tambor	Television	6320 Hollywood Boulevard	August 8, 2017
Akim Tamiroff	Motion pictures	1634 Vine Street	February 8, 1960
Jessica Tandy	Motion pictures	6284 Hollywood Boulevard	February 8, 1960
Quentin Tarantino	Motion pictures	6927 Hollywood Boulevard	December 21, 2015
Norman Taurog	Motion pictures	1600 Vine Street	February 8, 1960
Elizabeth Taylor	Motion pictures	6336 Hollywood Boulevard	February 8, 1960
Estelle Taylor	Motion pictures	1620 Vine Street	February 8, 1960
Kent Taylor	Motion pictures	1645 Vine Street	February 8, 1960
Kent Taylor	Television	6818 Hollywood Boulevard	February 8, 1960
Rip Taylor	Live performance	6625 Hollywood Boulevard	October 15, 1992
Robert Taylor	Motion pictures	1500 Vine Street	February 8, 1960
Ruth Ashton Taylor	Television	1540 Vine Street	December 13, 1990
Renata Tebaldi	Recording	6628 Hollywood Boulevard	February 8, 1960
Penn & Teller	Live performance	7003 Hollywood Boulevard	May 4, 2013
Shirley Temple	Motion pictures	1500 Vine Street	February 8, 1960
Alec Templeton	Radio	1724 Vine Street	February 8, 1960
The Temptations	Recording	7060 Hollywood Boulevard	September 14, 1994
Alice Terry	Motion pictures	6626 Hollywood Boulevard	February 8, 1960
John Tesh	Television	7021 Hollywood Boulevard	November 11, 1993
Irving Thalberg	Motion pictures	7006 Hollywood Boulevard	February 8, 1960
Thalia	Recording	6262 Hollywood Boulevard	December 5, 2013
Phyllis Thaxter	Motion pictures	6531 Hollywood Boulevard	February 8, 1960
Blanche Thebom	Recording	1651 Vine Street	February 8, 1960
Charlize Theron	Motion pictures	6801 Hollywood Boulevard	September 29, 2005
Bob Thomas	Motion pictures	6841 Hollywood Boulevard	December 1, 1988
Danny Thomas	Television	6901 Hollywood Boulevard	February 8, 1960
Jay Thomas	Radio	6161 Hollywood Boulevard	June 1, 1989
John Charles Thomas	Recording	6933 Hollywood Boulevard	February 8, 1960
Lowell Thomas	Motion pictures	6433 Hollywood Boulevard	February 8, 1960
Lowell Thomas	Radio	1752 Vine Street	February 8, 1960
Marlo Thomas	Television	6904 Hollywood Boulevard	December 3, 1992
Bill Thompson	Radio	7021 Hollywood Boulevard	February 8, 1960
Emma Thompson	Motion pictures	6714 Hollywood Boulevard	August 6, 2010
Kenan Thompson	Television	6627 Hollywood Boulevard	August 11, 2022
Fred Thomson	Motion pictures	6850 Hollywood Boulevard	February 8, 1960
Billy Bob Thornton	Motion pictures	6801 Hollywood Boulevard	October 7, 2004
Richard Thorpe	Motion pictures	6101 Hollywood Boulevard	February 8, 1960
The Three Stooges	Motion pictures	1560 Vine Street	August 30, 1983
Lawrence Tibbett	Recording	6325 Hollywood Boulevard	February 8, 1960

Name	Category	Address	Date
Gene Tierney	Motion pictures	6125 Hollywood Boulevard	February 8, 1960
Tinker Bell	Motion pictures	6834 Hollywood Boulevard	September 21, 2010
Steve Tisch	Motion pictures	6522 Hollywood Boulevard	June 1, 2001
Genevieve Tobin	Motion pictures	6119 Hollywood Boulevard	February 8, 1960
Thelma Todd	Motion pictures	6262 Hollywood Boulevard	February 8, 1960
Franchot Tone	Motion pictures	6560 Hollywood Boulevard	February 8, 1960
Regis Toomey	Motion pictures	7021 Hollywood Boulevard	February 8, 1960
Mel Tormé	Recording	1541 Vine Street	June 18, 1981
David Torrence	Motion pictures	6564 Hollywood Boulevard	August 15, 1958
Ernest Torrence	Motion pictures	6801 Hollywood Boulevard	February 8, 1960
Arturo Toscanini	Radio	6336 Hollywood Boulevard	February 8, 1960
Arturo Toscanini	Recording	6725 Hollywood Boulevard	February 8, 1960
Maurice Tourneur	Motion pictures	6243 Hollywood Boulevard	February 8, 1960
Lee Tracy	Motion pictures	1638 Vine Street	February 8, 1960
Spencer Tracy	Motion pictures	6814 Hollywood Boulevard	February 8, 1960
Helen Traubel	Recording	6422 Hollywood Boulevard	February 8, 1960
Fred Travalena	Live performance	7018 Hollywood Boulevard	February 3, 2005
Randy Travis	Recording	7021 Hollywood Boulevard	September 29, 2004
John Travolta	Motion pictures	6901 Hollywood Boulevard	June 5, 1985
Arthur Treacher	Motion pictures	6274 Hollywood Boulevard	February 8, 1960
Alex Trebek	Television	6501 Hollywood Boulevard	May 17, 1999
Claire Trevor	Motion pictures	6933 Hollywood Boulevard	February 8, 1960
Laurence Trimble	Motion pictures	6340 Hollywood Boulevard	February 8, 1960
Ernest Truex	Television	6721 Hollywood Boulevard	February 8, 1960
Donald Trump	Television	6801 Hollywood Boulevard	January 16, 2007
Ernest Tubb	Recording	1751 Vine Street	February 8, 1960
Stanley Tucci	Motion pictures	6930 Hollywood Boulevard	April 30, 2026
Forrest Tucker	Motion pictures	6385 Hollywood Boulevard	August 21, 1986
Sophie Tucker	Motion pictures	6321 Hollywood Boulevard	February 8, 1960
Thomas L Tully (Note: Tom Tully's star is incorrectly rendered as "Thomas L Tully".)	Motion pictures	6119 Hollywood Boulevard	February 8, 1960
Charlie Tuna	Radio	1560 Vine Street	January 10, 1990
Tommy Tune	Live performance	1777 Vine Street	August 12, 1993
Glynn Turman	Motion pictures	7065 Hollywood Boulevard	July 10, 2025
Lana Turner	Motion pictures	6241 Hollywood Boulevard	February 8, 1960
Ted Turner	Television	7000 Hollywood Boulevard	April 7, 2004
Tina Turner	Recording	1750 Vine Street	August 26, 1986
Ben Turpin	Motion pictures	1651 Vine Street	February 8, 1960
Lurene Tuttle	Radio	1760 Vine Street	February 8, 1960
Lurene Tuttle	Television	7011 Hollywood Boulevard	February 8, 1960
Shania Twain	Recording	6270 Hollywood Boulevard	June 2, 2011
Helen Twelvetrees	Motion pictures	6263 Hollywood Boulevard	December 31, 1969
Cicely Tyson	Motion pictures	7080 Hollywood Boulevard	August 21, 1997

== U ==
Name	Category	Address	Date
Carrie Underwood	Recording	1750 Vine Street	September 20, 2018
USC School of Cinematic Arts	Special	900 W 34th Street	September 10, 2009
Robert Urich	Television	7083 Hollywood Boulevard	December 12, 1995
Usher	Recording	6201 Hollywood Boulevard	September 7, 2016

== V ==
Name	Category	Address	Date
Vera Vague	Motion pictures	1720 Vine Street	February 8, 1960
Vera Vague	Radio	1639 Vine Street	February 8, 1960
Angelica Vale	Live performance	7060 Hollywood Boulevard	November 10, 2022
Ritchie Valens	Recording	6733 Hollywood Boulevard	May 11, 1990
Jack Valenti	Motion pictures	7000 Hollywood Boulevard	November 1, 1988
Rudolph Valentino	Motion pictures	6164 Hollywood Boulevard	February 8, 1960
Rudy Vallee	Radio	1632 Vine Street	February 8, 1960
Virginia Valli	Motion pictures	6125 Hollywood Boulevard	February 8, 1960
Mamie Van Doren	Motion pictures	7057 Hollywood Boulevard	February 1, 1994
Luther Vandross	Recording	1717 Vine Street	June 3, 2014
Dick Van Dyke	Television	7021 Hollywood Boulevard	February 25, 1993
W. S. Van Dyke	Motion pictures	6141 Hollywood Boulevard	February 8, 1960
Jo Van Fleet	Motion pictures	7010 Hollywood Boulevard	February 8, 1960
Dick Van Patten	Television	1541 Vine Street	November 20, 1985
Courtney B. Vance	Television	7007 Hollywood Boulevard	December 16, 2025
Vivian Vance	Television	7000 Hollywood Boulevard	February 14, 1991
Variety	Special	7020 Hollywood Boulevard	October 14, 2005
Sarah Vaughan	Recording	1724 Vine Street	July 31, 1985
Sarah Vaughan	Recording	6834 Hollywood Boulevard	February 8, 1960
Robert Vaughn	Motion pictures	6633 Hollywood Boulevard	July 27, 1998
Vince Vaughn	Motion pictures	6201 Hollywood Boulevard	August 12, 2024
Lupe Velez	Motion pictures	6927 Hollywood Boulevard	February 8, 1960
Evelyn Venable	Motion pictures	1500 Vine Street	February 8, 1960
Milo Ventimiglia	Television	6562 Hollywood Boulevard	January 10, 2022
Billy Vera	Recording	1770 Vine Street	February 16, 1988
Vera – Ellen	Motion pictures	7083 Hollywood Boulevard	February 8, 1960
Elena Verdugo	Television	1709 Vine Street	February 8, 1960
Sofia Vergara	Television	7013 Hollywood Boulevard	May 7, 2015
Bobby Vernon	Motion pictures	6825 Hollywood Boulevard	November 16, 1977
Victoria's Secret Angels	Special	6800 Hollywood Boulevard	November 12, 2007
Charles Vidor	Motion pictures	6676 Hollywood Boulevard	February 8, 1960
King Vidor	Motion pictures	6743 Hollywood Boulevard	February 8, 1960
Village People	Recording	6529 Hollywood Boulevard	September 12, 2008
Gene Vincent	Recording	1749 Vine Street	February 8, 1960
Helen Vinson	Motion pictures	1560 Vine Street	February 8, 1960
Bobby Vinton	Recording	6916 Hollywood Boulevard	February 8, 1960
Josef von Sternberg	Motion pictures	6401 Hollywood Boulevard	February 8, 1960
Erich von Stroheim	Motion pictures	6826 Hollywood Boulevard	February 8, 1960
Harry Von Zell	Radio	6521 Hollywood Boulevard	February 8, 1960

== W ==
Name	Category	Address	Date
Lindsay Wagner	Motion pictures	6767 Hollywood Boulevard	December 13, 1984
Robert Wagner	Television	7021 Hollywood Boulevard	July 16, 2002
Roger Wagner	Recording	7003 Hollywood Boulevard	December 31, 1969
Mark Wahlberg	Motion pictures	6259 Hollywood Boulevard	July 29, 2010
Jimmy Wakely	Recording	1680 Vine Street	February 8, 1960
Clint Walker	Television	1505 Vine Street	February 8, 1960
Robert Walker	Motion pictures	1709 Vine Street	February 8, 1960
Chris Wallace	Television	6253 Hollywood Boulevard	September 18, 2025
Mike Wallace	Television	6263 Hollywood Boulevard	February 8, 1960
Richard Wallace	Motion pictures	1560 Vine Street	February 8, 1960
James Wallington	Radio	6660 Hollywood Boulevard	February 8, 1960
Raoul Walsh	Motion pictures	6135 Hollywood Boulevard	February 8, 1960
Ray Walston	Live performance	7070 Hollywood Boulevard	December 8, 1995
Bruno Walter	Recording	6902 Hollywood Boulevard	February 8, 1960
Barbara Walters	Television	6801 Hollywood Boulevard	June 14, 2007
Charles Walters	Motion pictures	6402 Hollywood Boulevard	February 8, 1960
Henry B. Walthall	Motion pictures	6201 Hollywood Boulevard	February 8, 1960
Christoph Waltz	Motion pictures	6667 Hollywood Boulevard	December 1, 2014
Judge; Joseph Wapner	Television	6922 Hollywood Boulevard	November 12, 2009
WAR	Recording	6212 Hollywood Boulevard	June 5, 2025
Burt Ward	Television	6764 Hollywood Boulevard	January 9, 2020
Jay Ward	Television	7080 Hollywood Boulevard	June 21, 2000
Fred Waring	Radio	6556 Hollywood Boulevard	February 8, 1960
Fred Waring	Recording	6300 Hollywood Boulevard	February 8, 1960
Fred Waring	Television	1751 Vine Street	February 8, 1960
H. B. Warner	Motion pictures	6600 Hollywood Boulevard	February 8, 1960
Harry Warner	Motion pictures	6441 Hollywood Boulevard	February 8, 1960
Jack Warner	Motion pictures	6541 Hollywood Boulevard	February 8, 1960
Sam Warner	Motion pictures	6201 Hollywood Boulevard	February 8, 1960
Diane Warren	Recording	7021 Hollywood Boulevard	January 31, 2001
Ruth Warrick	Motion pictures	6689 Hollywood Boulevard	February 8, 1960
Dionne Warwick	Recording	6922 Hollywood Boulevard	December 12, 1985
Kerry Washington	Television	6258 Hollywood Boulevard	December 2, 2024
Lew Wasserman	Motion pictures	6925 Hollywood Boulevard	October 5, 2007
Willard Waterman	Radio	1601 Vine Street	February 8, 1960
John Waters	Motion pictures	6644 Hollywood Boulevard	September 18, 2023
Sam Waterston	Television	7040 Hollywood Boulevard	January 7, 2010
The Watson Family	Motion pictures	6674 Hollywood Boulevard	April 22, 1999
Naomi Watts	Motion pictures	6201 Hollywood Boulevard	October 13, 2025
John Wayne	Motion pictures	1541 Vine Street	February 8, 1960
Carl Weathers	Sports Entertainment	7076 Hollywood Boulevard	August 29, 2024
Dennis Weaver	Television	6822 Hollywood Boulevard	September 9, 1986
Sigourney Weaver	Motion pictures	7021 Hollywood Boulevard	December 16, 1999
Clifton Webb	Motion pictures	6850 Hollywood Boulevard	February 8, 1960
Jack Webb	Radio	7040 Hollywood Boulevard	February 8, 1960
Jack Webb	Television	6278 Hollywood Boulevard	February 8, 1960
Richard Webb	Television	7059 Hollywood Boulevard	February 1, 1994
Lois Weber	Motion pictures	6518 Hollywood Boulevard	February 8, 1960
Ted Weems	Recording	1680 Vine Street	February 8, 1960
Jerry Weintraub	Motion pictures	6931 Hollywood Boulevard	April 24, 1984
Johnny; Weissmuller	Television	6541 Hollywood Boulevard	February 8, 1960
Raquel Welch	Motion pictures	7021 Hollywood Boulevard	June 8, 1996
Lawrence Welk	Recording	6613 Hollywood Boulevard	February 8, 1960
Lawrence Welk	Television	1601 Vine Street	February 8, 1960
Orson Welles	Motion pictures	1600 Vine Street	February 8, 1960
Orson Welles	Radio	6552 Hollywood Boulevard	February 8, 1960
William Wellman	Motion pictures	6125 Hollywood Boulevard	February 8, 1960
John Wells	Television	6533 Hollywood Boulevard	January 12, 2012
Bill Welsh	Television	6362 Hollywood Boulevard	November 24, 1980
Ming-Na Wen	Television	6840 Hollywood Boulevard	May 30, 2023
Lina Wertmüller	Motion pictures	7065 Hollywood Boulevard	October 28, 2019
Adam West	Television	6764 Hollywood Boulevard	April 5, 2012
Mae West	Motion pictures	1560 Vine Street	February 8, 1960
The Westmores	Motion pictures	1645 Vine Street	October 3, 2008
Paul Weston	Recording	1535 Vine Street	February 8, 1960
Haskell Wexler	Motion pictures	7070 Hollywood Boulevard	February 28, 1996
Forest Whitaker	Motion pictures	6801 Hollywood Boulevard	April 16, 2007
Alice White	Motion pictures	1511 Vine Street	February 8, 1960
Barry White	Recording	6914 Hollywood Boulevard	September 12, 2013
Betty White	Television	6747 Hollywood Boulevard	February 18, 1988
Jack White	Motion pictures	6366 Hollywood Boulevard	February 8, 1960
Jules White	Motion pictures	1559 Vine Street	February 8, 1960
Pearl White	Motion pictures	6838 Hollywood Boulevard	February 8, 1960
Vanna White	Television	7018 Hollywood Boulevard	April 20, 2006
Paul Whiteman	Recording	6157 Hollywood Boulevard	February 8, 1960
Paul Whiteman	Radio	1601 Vine Street	February 8, 1960
Bradley Whitford	Television	6104 Hollywood Boulevard	September 30, 2026
Barbara Whiting	Television	6443 Hollywood Boulevard	February 8, 1960
Margaret Whiting	Recording	6623 Hollywood Boulevard	February 8, 1960
Slim Whitman	Recording	1709 Vine Street	February 8, 1960
Stuart Whitman	Motion pictures	7083 Hollywood Boulevard	February 1, 1998
James Whitmore	Television	6611 Hollywood Boulevard	February 8, 1960

Name	Category	Address	Date
Dick Whittinghill	Radio	6384 Hollywood Boulevard	December 13, 1978
Richard Widmark	Motion pictures	6800 Hollywood Boulevard	February 8, 1960
Henry Wilcoxon	Motion pictures	6256 Hollywood Boulevard	February 8, 1960
Cornel Wilde	Motion pictures	1635 Vine Street	February 8, 1960
Billy Wilder	Motion pictures	1751 Vine Street	February 8, 1960
Tichi Wilkerson – Kassel	Motion pictures	7000 Hollywood Boulevard	July 13, 1989
Warren William	Motion pictures	1559 Vine Street	February 8, 1960
Andy Williams	Recording	6667 Hollywood Boulevard	November 3, 1982
Bill Williams	Television	6145 Hollywood Boulevard	February 8, 1960
Billy Dee Williams	Motion pictures	1521 Vine Street	March 27, 1985
Cindy Williams	Television	7021 Hollywood Boulevard	August 12, 2004
Earle Williams	Motion pictures	1560 Vine Street	February 8, 1960
Esther Williams	Motion pictures	1560 Vine Street	February 8, 1960
Guy Williams	Television	7080 Hollywood Boulevard	August 2, 2001
Hank Williams	Recording	6400 Hollywood Boulevard	February 8, 1960
Joe Williams	Recording	6508 Hollywood Boulevard	June 13, 1983
Kathlyn Williams	Motion pictures	7038 Hollywood Boulevard	February 8, 1960
Paul Williams	Recording	6931 Hollywood Boulevard	August 10, 1983
Pharrell Williams	Recording	6270 Hollywood Boulevard	December 5, 2014
Robin Williams	Motion pictures	6925 Hollywood Boulevard	December 12, 1990
Roger Williams	Recording	1533 Vine Street	February 8, 1960
Tex Williams	Radio	6412 Hollywood Boulevard	February 8, 1960
Vanessa Williams	Recording	7000 Hollywood Boulevard	March 19, 2007
Wendy Williams	Television	6533 Hollywood Boulevard	October 17, 2019
Dave Willock	Television	6358 Hollywood Boulevard	February 8, 1960
Bruce Willis	Motion pictures	6915 Hollywood Boulevard	October 16, 2006
Chill Wills	Motion pictures	6923 Hollywood Boulevard	February 8, 1960
Meredith Willson	Radio	6411 Hollywood Boulevard	February 8, 1960
Ann & Nancy Wilson; Heart	Recording	6752 Hollywood Boulevard	September 25, 2012
August Wilson	Live performance	1611 Vine Street	January 7, 2025
Carey Wilson	Motion pictures	6301 Hollywood Boulevard	February 8, 1960
Charlie Wilson	Recording	6201 Hollywood Boulevard	January 29, 2024
Don Wilson	Radio	1500 Vine Street	February 8, 1960
Jackie Wilson	Recording	7057 Hollywood Boulevard	September 4, 2019
Lois Wilson	Motion pictures	6933 Hollywood Boulevard	February 8, 1960
Marie Wilson	Radio	6301 Hollywood Boulevard	February 8, 1960
Marie Wilson	Television	6765 Hollywood Boulevard	February 8, 1960
Marie Wilson	Motion pictures	6601 Hollywood Boulevard	February 8, 1960
Nancy Wilson	Recording	6541 Hollywood Boulevard	October 1, 1990
Ann & Nancy Wilson; Heart	Recording	6752 Hollywood Boulevard	September 25, 2012
Rita Wilson	Motion pictures	7024 Hollywood Boulevard	March 29, 2019
Bebe and Cece; Winans	Recording	6126 Hollywood Boulevard	October 20, 2011
Paul Winchell	Television	6333 Hollywood Boulevard	February 8, 1960
Walter Winchell	Radio	6714 Hollywood Boulevard	February 8, 1960
Walter Winchell	Television	1645 Vine Street	February 8, 1960
Claire Windsor	Motion pictures	7021 Hollywood Boulevard	February 8, 1960
Marie Windsor	Motion pictures	1549 Vine Street	January 19, 1983
Toby Wing	Motion pictures	6561 Hollywood Boulevard	February 8, 1960
Henry Winkler	Television	6233 Hollywood Boulevard	March 24, 1981
Irwin Winkler	Motion pictures	6801 Hollywood Boulevard	April 28, 2000
Charles Winninger	Radio	6333 Hollywood Boulevard	February 8, 1960
Kate Winslet	Motion pictures	6262 Hollywood Boulevard	March 17, 2014
Stan Winston	Motion pictures	6522 Hollywood Boulevard	February 23, 2001
Hugo Winterhalter	Recording	1600 Vine Street	February 8, 1960
Jonathan Winters	Television	6290 Hollywood Boulevard	February 8, 1960
Shelley Winters	Motion pictures	1752 Vine Street	February 8, 1960
Robert Wise	Motion pictures	6340 Hollywood Boulevard	February 8, 1960
Jane Withers	Motion pictures	6119 Hollywood Boulevard	February 8, 1960
Reese Witherspoon	Motion pictures	6262 Hollywood Boulevard	December 1, 2010
Dick Wolf	Television	7040 Hollywood Boulevard	March 29, 2007
David Wolper	Television	Sunset & Vine	March 17, 1976
Stevie Wonder	Recording	7050 Hollywood Boulevard	February 1, 1994
Anna May Wong	Motion pictures	1708 Vine Street	February 8, 1960
Natalie Wood	Motion pictures	7000 Hollywood Boulevard	February 1, 1987
Sam Wood	Motion pictures	6714 Hollywood Boulevard	February 8, 1960
Donald Woods	Television	6260 Hollywood Boulevard	February 8, 1960
James Woods	Motion pictures	7021 Hollywood Boulevard	October 15, 1998
Joanne Woodward	Motion pictures	6801 Hollywood Boulevard	February 8, 1960
Woody Woodpecker	Motion pictures	7000 Hollywood Boulevard	September 13, 1990
Monty Woolley	Motion pictures	6542 Hollywood Boulevard	February 8, 1960
Fay Wray	Motion pictures	6349 Hollywood Boulevard	February 8, 1960
Teresa Wright	Motion pictures	1680 Vine Street	February 8, 1960
Teresa Wright	Television	6405 Hollywood Boulevard	February 8, 1960
Jane Wyatt	Television	6350 Hollywood Boulevard	February 8, 1960
Noah Wyle	Television	6164 Hollywood Boulevard	April 9, 2026
William Wyler	Motion pictures	1731 Vine Street	February 8, 1960
Jane Wyman	Motion pictures	6607 Hollywood Boulevard	February 8, 1960
Jane Wyman	Television	1620 Vine Street	February 8, 1960
Ed Wynn	Motion pictures	1541 Vine Street	February 8, 1960
Ed Wynn	Radio	6333 Hollywood Boulevard	February 8, 1960
Ed Wynn	Television	6426 Hollywood Boulevard	February 8, 1960
Keenan Wynn	Television	1515 Vine Street	February 8, 1960

== X ==
No Entries

== Y ==
Name	Category	Address	Date
"Weird Al" Yankovic	Recording	6914 Hollywood Boulevard	August 27, 2018
Trisha Yearwood	Recording	1750 N. Vine Street	March 24, 2025
Michelle Yeoh	Motion pictures	6927 Hollywood Boulevard	February 18, 2026
Dwight Yoakam	Recording	7021 Hollywood Boulevard	June 5, 2003
Michael York	Motion pictures	6385 Hollywood Boulevard	June 28, 2002
Alan Young	Radio	6927 Hollywood Boulevard	February 8, 1960
Carleton Young	Radio	6733 Hollywood Boulevard	February 8, 1960
Clara; Kimball Young	Motion pictures	6513 Hollywood Boulevard	February 8, 1960
Gig Young	Television	6821 Hollywood Boulevard	February 8, 1960
Loretta Young	Motion pictures	6100 Hollywood Boulevard	February 8, 1960
Loretta Young	Television	6135 Hollywood Boulevard	February 8, 1960
Robert Young	Motion pictures	6933 Hollywood Boulevard	February 8, 1960
Robert Young	Radio	1620 Vine Street	February 8, 1960
Robert Young	Television	6360 Hollywood Boulevard	February 8, 1960
Roland Young	Motion pictures	6523 Hollywood Boulevard	February 8, 1960
Roland Young	Television	6315 Hollywood Boulevard	February 8, 1960
Victor Young	Recording	6363 Hollywood Boulevard	February 8, 1960

== Z ==
Name	Category	Address	Date
Florian ZaBach	Television	6505 Hollywood Boulevard	February 8, 1960
Darryl F Zanuck	Motion pictures	6336 Hollywood Boulevard	February 8, 1960
Richard D Zanuck	Motion pictures	6915 Hollywood Boulevard	December 11, 1968
Carmen Zapata	Live performance	6357 Hollywood Boulevard	October 2, 2003
Renee Zellweger	Motion pictures	7000 Hollywood Boulevard	May 24, 2005
Robert Zemeckis	Motion pictures	6925 Hollywood Boulevard	November 5, 2004
Efrem Zimbalist Jr	Television	7095 Hollywood Boulevard	February 1, 1994
Hans Zimmer	Motion pictures	6908 Hollywood Boulevard	December 8, 2010
Fred Zinnemann	Motion pictures	6629 Hollywood Boulevard	February 8, 1960
Adolph Zukor	Motion pictures	1617 Vine Street	February 8, 1960

== See also ==
- List of actors with Hollywood Walk of Fame motion picture stars
- List of fictional characters with stars on the Hollywood Walk of Fame
