= The Abbott and Costello Show (radio program) =

US comedy program

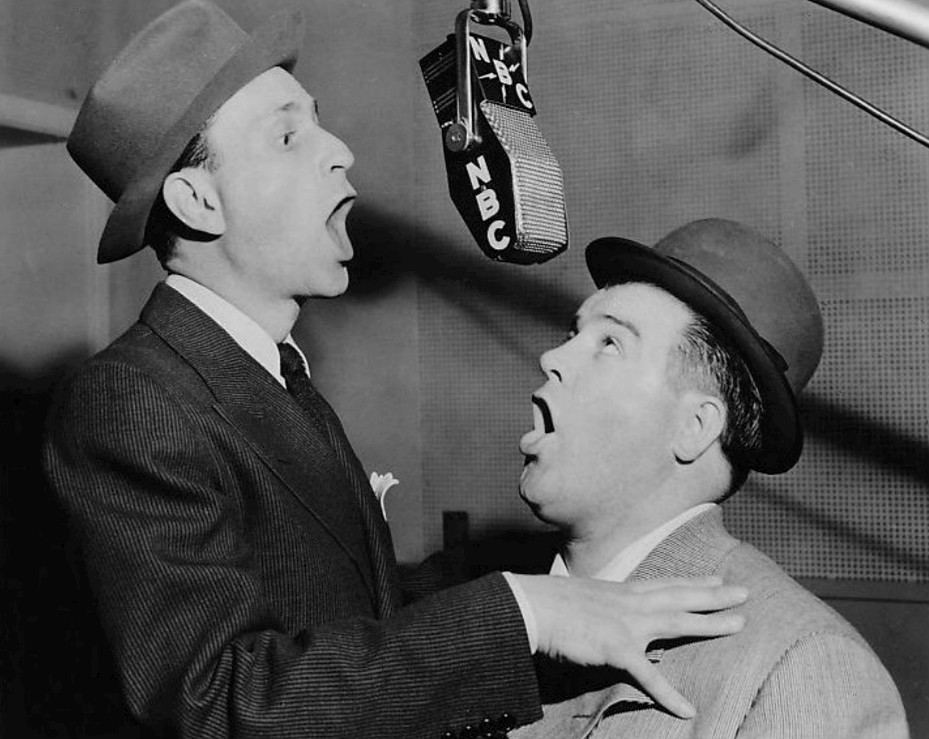
- Bud Abbott and Lou Costello in the NBC radio studios in 1942
- Genre: Comedy
- Running time: 30 minutes
- Country of origin: United States
- Language: English
- Syndicates: ABC; NBC
- TV adaptations: The Abbott and Costello Show
- Starring: Bud Abbott; Lou Costello
- Announcer: Ken Niles; Frank Bingman; Jim Doyle; Michael Roy; George Fenneman
- Written by: Martin Gosch; Howard Harris; Hal Fimberg; Don Prindle; Ed Cherkose; Len Stern; Martin Ragaway; Paul Conlan; Ed Forman; Pat Costello
- Produced by: Martin Gosch
- Original release: July 3, 1940 – June 9, 1949
- Sponsored by: Sal Hepatica; Camel (cigarettes)

The Abbott and Costello Show is a comedy program from the era of old-time radio in the United States. It was broadcast first on NBC and later on ABC, beginning on July 3, 1940 and ending on June 9, 1949.

== Format ==
Film stars Bud Abbott and Lou Costello adapted their talents to radio for the 30-minute weekly comedy program. Vincent Terrace, in his book, Radio Programs, 1924-1984: A Catalog of More Than 1800 Shows, wrote, "Many of the skits revolved around Bud and Lou's efforts to succeed in some sort of business venture." The sketches were often culled from their vaudeville act.

Abbott and Costello became one of the top radio comedy acts of the 1940s.

== Personnel ==
Supporting players included Elvia Allman (usually as Mrs. Niles, fictional wife of announcer Ken Niles), Joe Kirk (Costello's brother-in-law, most often as a heckler), Artie Auerbach as Mr. Kitzel, Iris Adrian (as Costello's sometimes girlfriend Lena Genster), Mel Blanc (many characters, including guest spots as Bugs Bunny), Sidney Fields (as Melonhead), Wally Brown, John Brown, Sharon Douglas, Verna Felton, Frank Nelson, Kent Rogers, Martha Wentworth and Benay Venuta. Guest stars included Cary Grant, Frank Sinatra, the Andrews Sisters and Lucille Ball.

Singers appearing on the show included Amy Arnell, Connie Haines, Marilyn Maxwell, Susan Miller and Marilyn Williams. The vocal groups were the Delta Rhythm Boys and the Les Baxter Singers. Orchestra leaders were Skinnay Ennis, Charles Hoff, Matty Matlock, Jack Meakin, Will Osborne, Freddie Rich, Leith Stevens and Peter van Steeden.

== Schedule ==
Abbott and Costello debuted on radio on Kate Smith's program in 1938. They continued performing on the show until the summer of 1940. Their first program of their own was a summer replacement for The Fred Allen Show in 1940. After a hiatus of two years, the show returned as a regular network program in the fall of 1942 and ran through the spring of 1949.

Starting date	Ending date	Network	Sponsor
July 3, 1940	September 25, 1940	NBC	Sal Hepatica
October 8, 1942	June 27, 1947	NBC	Camel cigarettes
October 1, 1947	June 9, 1949	ABC	Sustaining

Beginning in 1947, the programs were recorded and made available via transcriptions to stations outside of the regular ABC network.

A related program, The Abbott and Costello Children's Show, was broadcast on ABC beginning December 6, 1947 and ending March 26, 1949. It was sustaining and featured child performers and included quizzes and games.

== In popular culture ==
A catchphrase from Abbott and Costello's radio show, "I'm only three and a half years old" was often quoted in Looney Tunes cartoons and Tex Avery's cartoons for MGM. Even Bugs Bunny's famous catchphrase, "Ain't I a stinker?" was borrowed from Lou Costello.

== See also ==
- The Fred Allen Show
- The Jack Benny Program
- The Martin and Lewis Show
- The Pepsodent Show
