= Charlie Cantor =

American radio and television actor (1898–1966)

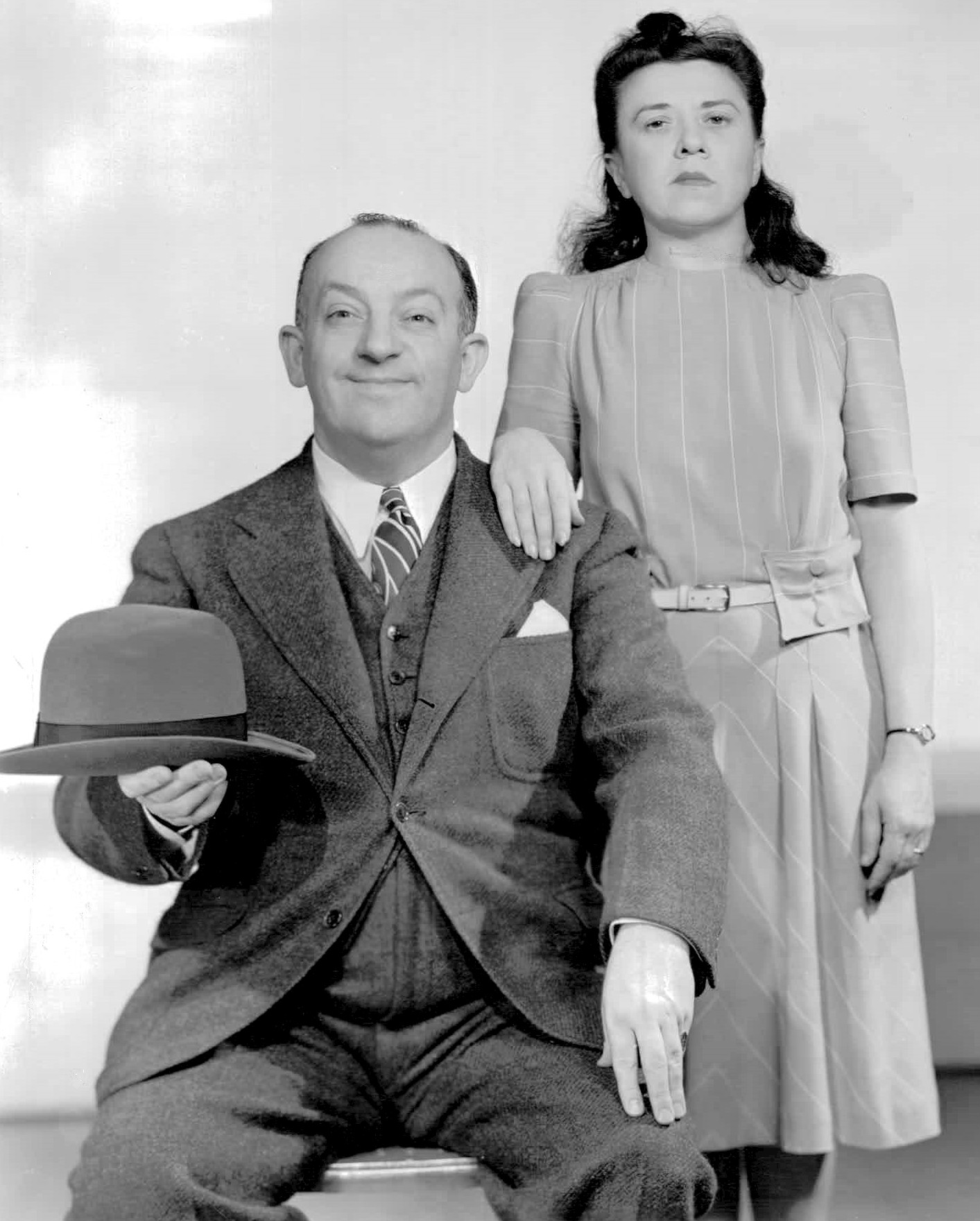
- Cantor on The Fred Allen Show with Minerva Pious, 1941.
- Born: Charles Cantor; September 4, 1898; Worcester, Massachusetts, U.S.
- Died: September 11, 1966 (aged 68); Hollywood, California, U.S.
- Occupation: Actor
- Years active: 1921–1965
- Spouse: Reece Cantor (1902–1968)

Charles Cantor (September 4, 1898 – September 11, 1966) was an American radio and television actor. Cantor was known for his frequent appearances on radio, sometimes, totaling 40 shows a week, during the 1930s, 1940s and 1950s. Cantor also appeared in nearly 30 television shows between 1951 and 1965.

Cantor's most notable roles on radio were those of Socrates Mulligan on the "Allen's Alley" segments of The Fred Allen Show, Clifton Finnegan on Duffy's Tavern and as Logan Jerkfinkel on The Jack Benny Program. Cantor also was the second of three actors to portray Abie Levy's father Solomon Levy on Abie's Irish Rose.

Cantor was not related to comedian Eddie Cantor (whose real last name was Itzkowitz and only used Cantor as a stage surname). However, his brother was actor Nat Cantor.

== Radio ==
Cantor first stepped onto the radio scene in 1921 as an actor for a local program at WHN in New York City. From there, Cantor's radio career took off. Between the 1930s and the 1950s, Cantor was a feature guest on anywhere between 20 and 40 radio programs a week, most of them comedy shows. Some of his radio guest star appearances included The Shadow, Dick Tracy, The Life of Riley, The Baby Snooks Show and The Kate Smith Hour.

Cantor became popular with radio audiences in 1940 when he joined the cast of The Fred Allen Show. Cantor, along with Alan Reed and John Brown, joined the cast of the new Texaco Star Theater. When "Allen's Alley", a segment in which star Fred Allen would stroll through an imaginary neighborhood conversing with imaginary neighbors, was first introduced in 1942, Cantor soon joined the list of Allen's "neighbors". Cantor portrayed the dim-witted Socrates Mulligan on the Alley.

Shortly after the premiere of Texaco Star Theater, Cantor joined the cast of Duffy's Tavern (which began in 1941) as Clifton Finnegan, a regular patron and the most frequently heard customer.

Cantor joined the cast of Abie's Irish Rose, replacing Alfred White in the role of Solomon Levy. Sol Levy was a widower who owned his own business in the Bronx and is Abie Levy's father. The program itself depicted the story of a Jewish man who marries an Irish woman despite family objections. Cantor was soon replaced by his "Allen's Alley" co-star Alan Reed. The program ended in 1944.

== Television ==
Cantor made his television debut on the February 25, 1951 episode of The Colgate Comedy Hour. Lena Horne, Jack Albertson and Chris Barbery also made appearances on the episode. Eddie Cantor was the host of the episode. Cantor also had a recurring role as Logan Jerkfinkel on both the radio and television incarnations of The Jack Benny Program. He appeared on 16 episodes of the television version of the program between 1954 and 1965.

Throughout the 1950s and 1960s, Cantor guest starred in 30 television shows. Along the list of Cantor's television credits included The Ray Bolger Show, Damon Runyon Theater, Alfred Hitchcock Presents, Schlitz Playhouse of Stars, Playhouse 90, December Bride, Bachelor Father, New Comedy Showcase, The Ann Sothern Show, The Red Skelton Show, The Danny Thomas Show, The Dick Van Dyke Show, Bob Hope Presents the Chrysler Theatre and The Lucy Show. His last appearance was on a 1965 episode of O.K. Crackerby!

== Death ==
Cantor died in Hollywood on September 11, 1966, a week after his 68th birthday. He was survived by his wife Reece Cantor, who herself died on May 16, 1968, at the age of 66. The couple are buried together at Mount Sinai Memorial Park in Los Angeles, California.

== Filmography ==
Year	Title	Role	Notes
1945	Duffy's Tavern	Clifton Finnegan	
1951	The Colgate Comedy Hour	Himself	4 episodes
1952	Stop, You're Killing Me	Mike	
1954–1965	The Jack Benny Program	Various	16 episodes
1955	The Ray Bolger Show	Artie Herman	1 episode
1955–1956	Damon Runyon Theater	Driscoll / Percentage Jones	3 episodes
1955–1956	Alfred Hitchcock Presents	Tommy DeWitt / Zander / Barney	Season 1 Episode 9: "The Long Shot" (1955) as Tommy DeWitt Season 1 Episode 20: "And So Died Riabouchinska" (1956) as Zander Season 2 Episode 7: "Alibi Me" (1956) as Barney
1956	Playhouse 90		1 episode
1957	Schlitz Playhouse of Stars		1 episode
1957	December Bride	Mr. Poole	1 episode
1957	Blondie	Andre, the Spy	1 episode
1957	The People's Choice	Shoeshine vendor	1 episode
1958	Bachelor Father	Harry	1 episode
1958	The Garry Moore Show	Himself	1 episode
1958	The Lineup		1 episode
1958	The Bob Cummings Show	The Motel Manager	1 episode
1960	The Comedy Spot		1 episode
1960	New Comedy Showcase	Wodecker	Season 1 Episode 5: "Maggie"
1960	The Ann Sothern Show	Julie	1 episode
1960	The Great Impostor	Dr. Kozumplik	Uncredited
1960–1961	Harrigan and Son	Gimpy	4 episodes
1961	The Asphalt Jungle	Willie Musk	1 episode
1961	The Red Skelton Show	Paw Kadiddlehopper / Lord Wickersham	2 episodes
1962	Cain's Hundred	Marty	2 episodes
1962	The Danny Thomas Show	Floyd	1 episode
1963–1965	The Joey Bishop Show	Inagain Finnegan / Mr. Cosgrove / Charlie	3 episodes
1963	The Dick Van Dyke Show	Bartender	1 episode
1964	Bob Hope Presents the Chrysler Theatre	Gino	1 episode
1965	Roadside	The Chief	1 episode
1965	That Funny Feeling	Little Man	Uncredited
1965	The Lucy Show	The Old Man	1 episode
1965	O.K. Crackerby!	Elwood	1 episode, (final appearance)
