= The Fred Allen Show =

American radio comedy program

- Other names: The Linit Bath Club Revue; The Salad Bowl Revue; The Sal Hepatica Revue; The Hour of Smiles; Town Hall Tonight; Texaco Star Theatre with Fred Allen
- Genre: Comedy
- Running time: 30 minutes (1932–1934; 1942–1949); 60 minutes (1934–1942)
- Country of origin: United States
- Language: English
- Syndicates: CBS; NBC
- Starring: Fred Allen; Portland Hoffa; Minerva Pious; Parker Fennelly; Jack Smart; Alan Reed; John Brown; Charlie Cantor (full list below)
- Announcer: Ken Roberts; Edmund Ruffner; Harry Von Zell; Arthur Godfrey; Jimmy Wallington; Kenny Delmar
- Produced by: Roger White; Pat Weaver; Vick Knight; Howard Reilly
- Original release: October 23, 1932 – June 26, 1949
- Opening theme: Oh, Mr. Allen?
- Other themes: Smiles
- Ending theme: Darn Ya, Smile
- Sponsored by: Linit Bath Soap; Hellmann's Mayonnaise; Ipana; Sal Hepatica; Texaco; Tenderleaf Tea; Ford Motor Company

The Fred Allen Show was a long-running American radio comedy program starring comedian Fred Allen and his wife Portland Hoffa. Over the course of the program's 17-year run, it was sponsored by Linit Bath Soaps, Hellmann's, Ipana, Sal Hepatica, Texaco and Tenderleaf Tea. The program ended in 1949 under the sponsorship of the Ford Motor Company.

The most popular period of the program was the few years of sponsorship under The Texas Company. During this time, the program was known as Texaco Star Theatre with Fred Allen. On the December 6, 1942 episode of the program, Allen premiered his first in a series of segments known as "Allen's Alley". The segments would have Allen strolling through an imaginary neighborhood, knocking on the "doors" of various neighbors, including average-American John Doe (played by John Brown), Mrs. Nussbaum (Minerva Pious), pompous poet Falstaff Openshaw (Alan Reed), Titus Moody (Parker Fennelly), and boisterous Southern senator Beauregard Claghorn (announcer Kenny Delmar). Texaco ended its sponsorship of the program in 1944.

Some prominent guest stars on Allen's program over the years included Frank Sinatra, Orson Welles, Roy Rogers, Bela Lugosi, Ed Gardner, Norman Corwin and Edgar Bergen & Charlie McCarthy.

== The Linit Bath Club Revue ==
The first version of The Fred Allen Show premiered under the title of The Linit Bath Club Revue on the Columbia Broadcasting System Sunday night October 23, 1932. The show featured Allen, Portland Hoffa, Minerva Pious and Jack Smart. Ken Roberts was the announcer while the music was furnished by Louis Katzman's orchestra and CBS house organist Ann Leaf, the latter of which was not actually present but actually broadcast from a small radio studio at the Paramount Theatre in Times Square, about a mile away.

According to his official website, Fred Allen had trouble from the beginning of it all with the program's sponsor, Linit bath soaps and with the advertising agency that supervised production, apparently over the organ interludes that Allen would look on quite negatively in his memoirs. After only a single season and 26 weeks on the air, on April 16, 1933, Linit pulled the plug on the Revue.

== The Salad Bowl Revue ==
After the failure and conflict brought on by Linit, in 1933 Allen made the move to NBC with The Salad Bowl Revue. The program premiered on NBC's Red Network on August 4 of that year. The program moved to a new night, Fridays. To avoid any unneeded conflict as he had with Linit, Allen took over all writing responsibilities of the show. Sponsorship changed over to Hellmann's Mayonnaise. Not popular enough with listeners, and suffering increased tension between Allen and Hellmann's, The Salad Bowl Revue concluded on December 1, 1933.

== Sal Hepatica and The Hour of Smiles ==
The same advertising agency that represented Hellmann's Mayonnaise also served as the representative for Bristol-Myers' Sal Hepatica laxative. So on January 3, 1934, The Sal Hepatica Revue was born. Edmund "Tiny" Ruffner from The Salad Bowl Revue rejoined Allen as announcer, as well as the Ferde Grofé Orchestra and actors Minerva Pious, Jack Smart and Allen's wife Portland Hoffa all rejoining Allen on Sal Hepatica.

The biggest change besides the title and the commercials was the move from Friday to Wednesday nights. In writing the show, Allen did begin to experiment with a community show theme. He began to gain a reputation for topical humor with news from the fictional town of Bedlamville. He peppered his "Town Hall bulletins" with fictional local characters such as Hodge White the Grocer and Pop Mullen the Lunch Wagon Man, who were all described, but never given voice.

Bristol-Myers also were the manufacturers of Ipana toothpaste during this time and decided to expand The Sal Hepatica Revue to the entire 9:00 hour on March 21, 1934. Bristol-Myers felt as though they could save money by advertising two products on one single program in one hour. The program was renamed The Hour of Smiles. The first half-hour (9–9:30) was sponsored by Ipana, "the smile of beauty", and the last half-hour (9:30–10) was sponsored by Sal Hepatica, "the smile of health".

The concept was also slightly retooled. Allen's concept for The Hour of Smiles was to be a small town hall weekly entertainment. The program didn't have the budgetary freedom to hire big-name acts to fill the hour-long program, so other features had to be invented. The weekly newsreels gave Allen a chance to burlesque current events and people in the public eye. The second half of the show was often devoted to amateurs. Not only was this an inexpensive and entertaining time filler, but it allowed Allen to do the ad-lib, which he enjoyed very much.

== Town Hall Tonight ==
On July 11, 1934, The Hour of Smiles was renamed Town Hall Tonight keeping in sync with Allen's town hall concept on Hour of Smiles. Regulars on the program included Allen, Hoffa, Pious and Smart along with newcomers Scrappy Lambert, Bob Moody, Randolph Weyant and Leonard Stokes (known on the program as the "Town Hall Quartet") and Helen Carroll. In the fall of 1938, Allen signed The Merry Macs to a full-season contract. Tiny Ruffner was the original announcer for this version of the program with Harry Von Zell taking over those duties starting with the second season, which also saw Peter Van Steeden take over from Grofe. Town Hall Tonight was renamed The Fred Allen Show on October 4, 1939.

=== Opening and closing ===
A typical opening heard by listeners on Town Hall Tonight might have been as follows:

Announcer: An hour of smiles, it's Town Hall Tonight. 60 minutes of fun and music brought to you by Ipana toothpaste; Ipana, for the smile of beauty. Fun with our star comedian Fred Allen, music with Peter Van Steeden, new features, new laughs, it's Town Hall Tonight.

A typical closing that could be heard by listeners every week on the program might have been as follows:

Announcer: We hope, ladies and gentlemen, that tonight's program has brought you all another hour of smiles and that you'll remember to be with us again next Wednesday. In the meantime, we hope you'll remember the product that makes this Fred Allen show possible, Ipana toothpaste for the smile of beauty.
Allen: Good night, ladies and gentlemen, and don't forget next Wednesday night for another hour of smiles in the old town hall. This is Fred Allen saying good night.
Announcer: This is the Red Network of the National Broadcasting Company.

=== The Benny–Allen Feud ===
The memorable "feud" between Fred Allen and Jack Benny of The Jell-O Program began on a 1936 episode of Town Hall Tonight. On December 30, 1936, Allen had as one of his guests in the amateur portion of his program future professional violinist Stuart Canin. Then 10-year-old Canin performed Schubert's The Bee on his violin. After his rendition of the classic, Allen made reference to "a certain alleged violin player [who] should be ashamed of himself," noting the not so good violin playing synonymous with Benny.

For nearly two decades, the two exchanged insults on each other's shows so convincingly that fans of either show might have believed they had become blood enemies. In fact, the two men were close friends and admired each other greatly. Benny and Allen often appeared on each other's shows during the feud, both in acknowledged guest spots and surprise cameos. On one Christmas program, Allen thanked Benny for sending him a Christmas tree, but then added that the tree had died. "Well, what do you expect," quipped Allen, "when the tree is in Brooklyn and the sap is in Hollywood." Benny in his memoir, Sunday Nights at Seven, and Allen in his memoir, Treadmill to Oblivion, revealed that both comedians writing staffs often met together to plot the direction of the mock feud. If Allen parodied The Jack Benny Program (as "The Pinch Penny Program"), Benny responded with a parody of Town Hall Tonight ("Clown Hall Tonight"). Their playful sniping ("Benny was born ignorant, and he's been losing ground ever since.") also appeared in the films Love Thy Neighbor and It's in the Bag!

The comedians planned to settle their fictional feud on March 21, 1937, during a broadcast of Jack Benny's show from the Hotel Pierre in New York, but the event never transpired and the trade of insults continued for years.

One memorable period during the feud came during Allen's parody of the popular quiz show Queen for a Day. Calling the sketch "King for a Day", Allen played the host and Benny a contestant who sneaked onto the show using the alias Myron Proudfoot. Benny answered the prize-winning question correctly and Allen crowned him "king" and showered him with worthless prizes. Allen proudly announced, "Tomorrow night, in your ermine robe, you will be whisked by bicycle to Orange, New Jersey, where you will be the judge in a chicken-cleaning contest." A professional clothes press was wheeled on stage to press the suit Benny was wearing; Allen instructed his aides to remove his suit, one item at a time, ending with his trousers, each removal provoking louder laughter from the studio audience. After his trousers came off, Benny howled, "Allen, you haven't seen the end of me!", to which Allen immediately replied, "It won't be long now!" The sketch and the ensuing laughter ran so long that announcer Kenny Delmar was cut off by the network before he could finish his final commercial and the show's credits. (Allen was notorious for running over time on many of his shows due to his ad libbing.)

=== Production costs and ratings ===
To promote Town Hall Tonight, Bristol-Myers spent between roughly $20–25,000 an episode. By 1938, costs decreased to around $10,000, around $4,500 less than the average production cost of a top-ten rated radio program. Network time, however, for the hour-long program cost approximately $1,200 more than other shows in the top ten.

According to a 1937 ratings survey conducted by the Cooperative Analysis of Broadcasting (CAB), Town Hall Tonight was the fifth most listened to program in America amongst urban listeners. The show did not score well in the ratings among rural listeners.

== Texaco Star Theater ==
In the early months of 1940, Allen's contract with Bristol-Myers was set to expire. However, during the same time, Allen was in contract negotiations with the Texas Company. Allen and the Texas Company, or Texaco, as it was more commonly referred to, reached a deal during the third week of May which had Allen hosting the new Texaco Star Theatre.

On October 2, 1940, the Texaco Star Theatre with Fred Allen premiered on Allen's home station of CBS airing Wednesdays at 9. This was the first time Allen hosted a radio program on the network in seven years. The show moved to Sundays on March 8, 1942, replacing The Ford Symphony Hour. On October 4, 1942, the show changed from an hour-long format to a 30-minute format marking the first time Allen hosted a 30-minute program in eight years.

The program saw the inclusion of regulars Charlie Cantor, Alan Reed and John Brown. Jimmy Wallington was the show's announcer (having worked on Texaco's radio programs since 1935), except for a number of programs in the fall of 1942 when he was briefly replaced by Arthur Godfrey. The bandleader was Al Goodman.

For the show's first two seasons, singer Kenny Baker was a featured player, having appeared on both the previous iteration of the Texaco program and more importantly, on Jack Benny's show, serving up a new angle to the humorous "feud" between both comedians. However, by late 1941, Baker had become increasingly difficult to manage, as his song choices were often slow tunes that lasted up to four minutes (which gave Allen less time to ad lib), and controversy arose in December when he performed "Ave Maria" in German, just a few weeks after the U.S. actively entered World War II, leading irate listeners to address their complaints to the network and sponsors. By the time the show switched to Sunday evenings, Baker's role was reduced to singing his weekly numbers with little interaction with Allen whatsoever—in fact, Variety reported that both men were not on speaking terms by the end of the 1941–42 season.

Allen's health issues led him to extend his summer 1943 vacation until late December (Minerva Pious and John Brown left for Hollywood in the interim, although Pious would return in February 1944) and hosted his last episode of Texaco Star Theatre on June 25, 1944.

=== Allen's Alley ===
Besides the Benny-Allen feud, perhaps the most memorable part of The Fred Allen Show were the "Allen's Alley" segments. The segments would usually have Allen strolling through an imaginary neighborhood, knocking on the "doors" of various neighbors. The first "Allen's Alley" segment was broadcast on Sunday December 6, 1942.

More often than not on the segments, Allen could be found visiting average-American John Doe (played by John Brown), the Brooklyn tenement of Mrs. Pansy Nussbaum (Minerva Pious), pompous poets Falstaff Openshaw (Alan Reed), Humphrey Titter and Thorndyle Swinburne, the farmhouse of Titus Moody (Parker Fennelly), famous for his line "Howdy, Bub" he used when greeting Allen, the shack of Ajax Cassidy (Peter Donald), and the antebellum mansion of boisterous Southern senator Beauregard Claghorn (announcer Kenny Delmar).

Mrs. Nussbaum was heard discussing her problems with husband Pierre. Network executives were concerned about Mrs. Nussbaum's accent but audience reaction to Mrs. Nussbaum was favorable. She, along with the other residents of "Allen's Alley", became household names and were some of the best-known characters of radio's golden age.

== The Fred Allen Show ==
After a nearly 16-month hiatus from radio due to high blood pressure, Allen returned to radio with The Fred Allen Show on Sunday, October 7, 1945. He also returned to his old network of NBC. Overlands, the show was picked up in Canada by the Trans-Canada Network. The program, originally broadcast in the 8:30 timeslot, moved up to the 8:00 slot beginning on January 2, 1949, in its final season. Standard Brands was the original sponsor of the program, paying nearly $20,000 a week for the production of the show and to advertise their Tenderleaf Tea and Blue Bonnet margarine. Alongside Allen and Hoffa, the show featured Kenny Delmar (who doubled as announcer), Minerva Pious, Parker Fennelly, Peter Donald, Al Goodman's orchestra and songs by the DeMarco Sisters.

The Fred Allen Show soon became a part of radio's "most listened-to night of the week". Also with Allen on Sunday nights were Jack Benny and Edgar Bergen. For the 1945–46 and 1947–48 radio seasons, both The Jack Benny Program and The Chase and Sanborn Hour preceded Allen on Sunday nights. The Chase and Sanborn Hour also, coincidentally, was sponsored by Standard Brands through their Chase and Sanborn Coffee division.

During the show's third season in January 1949, Standard Brands dropped The Fred Allen Show mainly due to the high cost of production and talent for the program. The Ford Motor Company soon picked up the increased tab of $22,000 a week needed to produce the program.

=== Censors ===
Fred Allen was noted for his battles with network officials during his radio years which often led to the censoring of a few moments to minutes of his show. These battles apparently date back to Town Hall Tonight. To try to control this behavior, network officials began making Allen submit "verbatim scripts" prior to air for their approval. Oftentimes, network officials would make Allen delete or revise a joke here and there before approving the script for approval. In retaliation, Allen began inserting jokes in his script he had no intention of using on air as "bargaining chips" for the network, agreeing to cut certain jokes in exchange for others. In addition, Allen would often ad-lib material and since most radio programs in those days were broadcast live, with the exception of the occasional delay here and there, the audience would sometimes hear a bleep in place of a word or phrase.

Such an incident happened in the night of the April 20, 1947 broadcast of The Fred Allen Show. Allen was censored for 30 seconds when he referred to an imaginary NBC vice-president who was "in charge of program ends". He went on to explain to his audience that this vice-president saved these hours, minutes and seconds that radio programs ran over their allotted time until he had two weeks' worth of them and then used the time for a two-week vacation. In the coming weeks, several other comedians were also censored for speaking about the Allen incident. Red Skelton of The Raleigh Cigarette Program and Bob Hope of The Pepsodent Show were amongst those comedians. After sometime of public outcry and protests, NBC indicated it would no longer censor future broadcasts of any show for similar instances.

=== Decline ===
During the final years of his radio show, Fred Allen suffered two declines. One decline was in his program's ratings and the other was an unfortunate decline in his health.

On February 1, 1948, The Fred Allen Show received a Hooperating of 28.7 and was the number one listened-to program on radio. However, when ABC pitted the new Stop the Music program against the Allen and Bergen-McCarthy programs, ratings for both programs plummeted, despite Allen's offer of "insurance" to any listener who had missed out on a prize due to their listening to his show. By the May 7 rating, the program went down to number 13 with a rating of 16.4. The lowest Hooperating the program received was a 7.9 in March 1949. During this time, Stop the Music was a top-ten rated program.

Allen announced during the summer of 1949 that he would not return to radio the following fall due to health issues and on June 26, 1949, The Fred Allen Show ended for good. Ironically, his last guest was Jack Benny. Shortly after the end of his program, he signed a contract stating that in the future he could only perform on NBC radio programs. This was a precautionary measure as several of NBC's biggest stars, including Skelton, Benny and Bergen, were lost in William S. Paley's infamous "talent raids" and were now performing on CBS.

Allen never starred in another weekly radio program again nor did he take his program to the new medium of television like his radio "foe" Jack Benny. Allen did become a supporting cast member of The Big Show starring Tallulah Bankhead between 1950 and 1952. He also hosted his own television series, Judge for Yourself, for one season on NBC before becoming a regular panelist on the CBS television game show What's My Line?.

Allen's health worsened further during his time on What's My Line? and on March 17, 1956, while strolling down the streets of New York City, he suffered a heart attack and died at the age of 61. During the final ninety seconds of the next night's What's My Line? broadcast, host John Charles Daly along with fellow panelists Arlene Francis, Dorothy Kilgallen and Bennett Cerf, and former regular panelist Steve Allen, gave brief but heartfelt tributes to Allen.

== Ratings ==
| Season | Year | Timeslot | Sponsor | Network | Listeners (in millions) | Rank (viewers) | Ref |
|---|---|---|---|---|---|---|---|
| 1 | 1932–33 | Sundays at 9–9:30 pm | Linit Bath Soap | CBS | N/A | Not in top 20 | |
| 2 | 1933–34 | Fridays at 10–10:30 pm | Hellmann's Mayonnaise | NBC Red | 18.5 | 17th (tied with Myrt and Marge) | |
| 2 | 1933–34 | Wednesdays at 9–9:30 pm (until March 1934) | Sal Hepatica | NBC Red | 18.5 | 17th (tied with Myrt and Marge) | |
| 3 | 1934–35 | Wednesdays at 9–10 pm | Ipana and Sal Hepatica | NBC Red | 32.0 | 4th | |
| 4 | 1935–36 | Wednesdays at 9–10 pm | Ipana and Sal Hepatica | NBC Red | 22.2 | 7th (tied with First Nighter) | |
| 5 | 1936–37 | Wednesdays at 9–10 pm | Ipana and Sal Hepatica | NBC Red | 20.6 | 7th (tied with First Nighter) | |
| 6 | 1937–38 | Wednesdays at 9–10 pm | Ipana and Sal Hepatica | NBC Red | 20.5 | 9th | |
| 7 | 1938–39 | Wednesdays at 9–10 pm | Ipana and Sal Hepatica | NBC Red | 18.1 | 9th | |
| 8 | 1939–40 | Wednesdays at 9–10 pm | Ipana and Sal Hepatica | NBC Red | 16.6 | 18th | |
| 9 | 1940–41 | Wednesdays at 9–10 pm | Texaco | CBS | N/A | Not in top 20 | |
| 10 | 1941–42 | Sundays at 9–10 pm (from March 1942) | Texaco | CBS | N/A | Not in top 20 | |
| 11 | 1942–43 | Sundays at 9:30–10 pm | Texaco | CBS | 21.6 | 15th | |
| 12 | 1943–44 (season began in December) | Sundays at 9:30–10 pm | Texaco | CBS | 19.8 | 14th | |
| - | 1944–45 | Allen did not have a program this season for health reasons | N/A | N/A | N/A | N/A | |
| 13 | 1945–46 | Sundays at 8:30–9 pm | Tenderleaf Tea | NBC | 22.7 | 8th | |
| 14 | 1946–47 | Sundays at 8:30–9 pm | Tenderleaf Tea | NBC | 24.9 | 5th | |
| 15 | 1947–48 | Sundays at 8:30–9 pm | Ford | NBC | 28.7 | 1st | |
| 16 | 1948–49 | Sundays at 8:30–9 pm | Ford | NBC | N/A | Not in top 20 | |
