= The Ipana Troubadors =

The Ipana Troubadors (aka The Ipana Troubadours) was a musical variety radio program which began in New York on WEAF in 1923. In actuality, the Troubadors were the Sam Lanin Orchestra. They opened the show with their theme, "Smiles."

The show was sponsored by Bristol Myers' Ipana Toothpaste, and it was during this period that Bristol Myers introduced the slogan, "Ipana for the Smile of Beauty; Sal Hepatica for the Smile of Health."

With a mix of hot foxtrots, sweet waltzes and snappy novelty tunes, the show moved from WEAF to the NBC Red Network (1926–28) for a 30-minute series on Wednesday evenings at 9pm. It then aired on the Blue Network (1929–31) Mondays at 8:30pm. Network radio exposure made the Ipana Troubadors one of the most well-known dance bands of the 1920s, resulting in a recording contract with Columbia and bookings at dance halls, such as the Casino at Bemus Point, New York. However, the recording contract covered only the Ipana Troubadors, so Lanin continued to recording on other labels under his own name and a variety of pseudonyms. One guest vocalist with the Troubadors was Bing Crosby who recorded "I'll Get By" and "Rose of Mandalay" with Lanin in December 1928.

After Bristol-Myers stopped radio advertising in 1931, the show returned for the 1933–34 season as a variety show, broadcast Wednesdays at 9pm on NBC Red. Helen Hayes was a guest on the show of October 4, 1933, appearing in a scene with John Beal. In 1934, The Ipana Troubadors was replaced by the first half of Fred Allen's The Hour of Smiles, the Troubadours moniker being used to refer to the show's orchestra, led by Peter van Steeden.

Radio station policies in the early 1920s dictated that no commercial messages intrude on a program. However, once the program moved to NBC, the attitude toward advertising accelerated, as noted by Timothy D. Taylor in "Music and Advertising in Early Radio":

Spot and national advertisements frequently had a tie-in, often simply a plain poster or print ad, and frequently more. A brochure about Ipana Toothpaste produced by NBC in 1928 included photos of the tie-ins that Ipana provided to customers who wrote in: a Magic Radio Time Table pad, so that listeners could write down their favorite programs; a bridge score card; a photo of the Ipana Troubadors, the program’s resident musicians; a card with a paean to the smile. All of these items had the Ipana name prominently displayed. Then there was the tie-in material made available to dealers: posters, brochures, a “radio applause card” that listeners could take to send in comments on the program, and more (National Broadcasting Company, Improving the Smiles of a Nation!).

Tommy and Jimmy Dorsey were heard on the show during the 1920s, along with Red Nichols and others. Musicians during the 1930s included Jack Teagarden and Joe Venuti, with vocalists Chick Bullock and Dick Robertson. Another guest was vaudeville headliner Marion Harris, billed by NBC as "The Little Girl with the Big Voice."

== Selective discography ==
- "Paddlin' Madelin' Home (vocal by Billy Jones) (1926)
- "When the Red, Red Robin (Comes Bob, Bob, Bobbin' Along)" (vocal Franklyn Baur) (1926)
- "Baby Face" (vocal Lewis James) (1926)
- "Mary Lou" (vocal Charles Kaley) (1927
- "'S Wonderful" (vocal Scrappy Lambert)
- "Tea for Two" (vocal Scrappy Lambert) (1930)
- "Three Little Words" (vocal by Paul Small) (1930)

== Listen to ==
- Dismuke's: Bing Crosby and the Ipana Troubadors: "I'll Get By" (1929)
- Red Hot Jazz: Sam Lanin's Troubadors: "Singin' in the Bathtub"
