= A Day in the Life of Dennis Day =

American old-time radio situation comedy

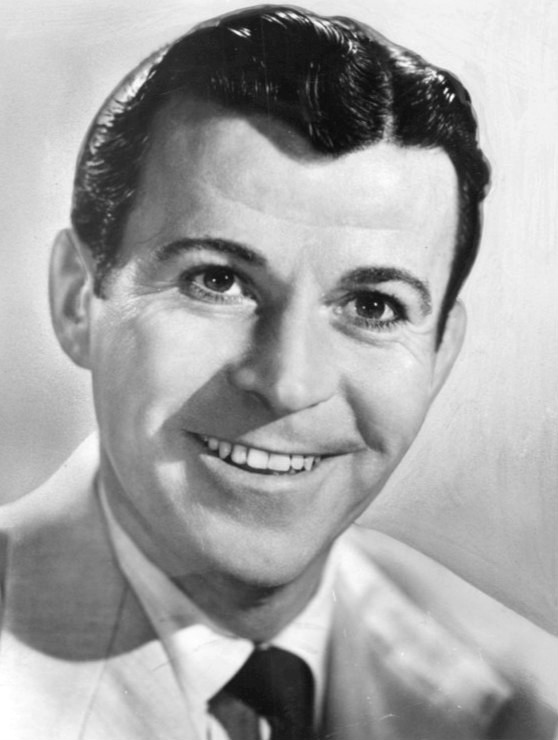
- Dennis Day
- Other names: The Dennis Day Show
- Genre: Situation comedy
- Running time: 30 minutes
- Country of origin: United States
- Language: English
- Syndicates: NBC
- Starring: Dennis Day
- Announcer: Frank Barton; Verne Smith; Jimmy Wallington
- Produced by: Bill Harding
- Original release: October 3, 1946 – June 30, 1951
- Sponsored by: Colgate-Palmolive (Colgate Dental Creme, Lustre-Creme Shampoo)

A Day in the Life of Dennis Day is an American old-time radio situation comedy. It was broadcast on NBC from October 3, 1946, to June 30, 1951. It is also sometimes referred to as The Dennis Day Show (not to be confused with the television program of the same name).

== Format ==
For most of the program's time on the air, Dennis Day played a soda jerk who sang as he worked. His character was naive, innocent, and prone to making wisecracks, much like the character Day played on The Jack Benny Program. Radio historian John Dunning wrote, "His [the character's] name was Dennis Day, but not, he emphasized, the same Dennis Day as that bright young man on the air with Jack Benny." Plots often derived from problems with his girlfriend and her parents. Before the show ended, it changed to a variety format.

Being the star of his own program was a departure from Day's previous experience as a regular on Benny's show. "I'm just as scared as I was in 1939 [when he joined Benny's show]," he said. "You know, you get used to being a stooge. This one I'll have to carry myself."

== Personnel ==
Day starred as himself in the program, which began after he was discharged from the Navy in 1946. Mildred Anderson (played at different times by Ilene Woods, Bettie Miles, Barbara Eiler, and Sharon Douglas) was Day's girlfriend. Mildred's parents, Herbert and Clara Anderson (played by Francis "Dink" Trout and Bea Benaderet, respectively), owned the boarding house in which Day lived. Homer Willoughby (played by John Brown) owned the drugstore in which Day worked.

Announcers were Frank Barton, Verne Smith, and Jimmy Wallington. Ken Carson sang for commercials. Instrumental music was by Robert Armbruster and Charles Dant. The producer was Bill Harding.
