= Abbott and Costello (disambiguation) =

Abbott and Costello was a comedy team of film, vaudeville, radio and television.

Abbott and Costello may refer more specifically to several shows they were involved in:

- The Abbott and Costello Cartoon Show, a 1960s television program
- The Abbott and Costello Show, a 1950s television program
- The Abbott and Costello Show (radio program), a 1940s radio program
