= New Comedy Showcase =

American television anthology series

- Newspaper advertisement for the premiere episode of New Comedy Showcase on August 1, 1960.
- Genre: Anthology series
- Country of origin: United States
- Original language: English
- No. of seasons: 1
- No. of episodes: 8

Production
- Running time: 30 minutes

Original release
- Network: CBS
- Release: August 1 – September 19, 1960

New Comedy Showcase is an American anthology television series that aired on CBS in the summer of 1960. The 30-minute episodes consisted of unsold television pilots.

== Background ==
By the mid-1950s, the practice of television executives of ordering dozens of pilots for proposed television series each year – far more than their networks could possibly broadcast as series – had created a sizable body of unsold pilots that had never aired. By 1954, the American television industry had begun to consider the idea of packaging these unsold pilots in anthology series and airing them during the summer, providing television networks with a way of both providing fresh programming during the summer rerun season and recouping at least some of the expense of producing them. ABC and NBC pioneered the concept in the summer of 1956, simultaneously premiering G.E. Summer Originals (on ABC) and Sneak Preview (on NBC), but CBS did not air its first two such series, The Comedy Spot and New Comedy Showcase, until the summer of 1960.

New Comedy Showcase was a summer replacement for Hennesey and consisted entirely of unsold pilots for situation comedies. Stars appearing in the series included Leon Ames, Jack Carson, Dick Van Dyke, Wayne Morris, George Murphy, Margaret O'Brien, Janis Paige, Martha Scott, Walter Slezak, and Gil Stratton.

== Broadcast history ==
New Comedy Showcase ran for eight episodes over the course of eight consecutive weeks in the summer of 1960, airing on CBS from 10:00 to 10:30 p.m. Eastern Time on Monday evenings. It premiered on August 1, and its last episode aired on September 19.

== Episodes ==
No. in season	Title	Directed by	Written by	Original release date
1	"You're Only Young Twice"	Arthur Lubin	Bob Schiller, Norman Tokar, & Bob Weiskopf	August 1, 1960
After their youngest daughter gets married, a sprightly romantic couple brings their baby granddaughter along with them when they go on a second honeymoon. The desk clerk mistakes them for newlyweds when they check in at their hotel, and when the hotel manager learns that they have a baby in their room hilarious complications arise. Starring George Murphy, Martha Scott, Jane Darwell, Carol Leigh, Jimmy Lydon, Bart Patton, Roger Perry, Sue Randall, and Nancy Valentine.
2	"Johnny Come Lately"	James V. Kern	Irving Elinson & Robert O'Brien	August 8, 1960
A crusading television newscaster in the mold of Walter Winchell, Edward R. Murrow, Jimmie Fidler, and Paul Coates gets himself in trouble when he disguises himself as a United States Navy sailor in an attempt to expose a racket that preys upon unwary sailors. Starring Jack Carson, Marie Windsor, Richard Reeves, Alvy Moore, Ernest Sarracino, Tracey Morgan, and Barbara Knudsen.
3	"They Went Thataway"	Robert L. Friend	Jack Schaefer & Allan Sloane	August 15, 1960
On the 19th-century American frontier, Black Ace Burton is a tough man with a reputation as a fearsome and ruthless gunfighter, but he dislikes shooting people and in fact has never actually shot anyone. Although the sleepy and slovenly local sheriff has a quick draw, he does little to interfere with Burton, but when a young punk named Poison Pete who wants to earn a reputation of his own challenges him, Burton has to engage in fancy sharpshooting to defend himself without actually shooting Pete. Starring James Westerfield, Ron Hagerthy, and Wayne Morris. An unsold pilot for a series spoofing Westerns in which stereotypical Western characters do not engage in stereotypical Western behaviors. The proposed series originally was intended to star Morris as Burton, but in the pilot Westerfield played the role instead. The episode was filmed in Tascosa, Texas, a ghost town in the Texas panhandle about 200 miles (320 km) south of Dodge City, Kansas. Jack Schaefer, who co-wrote the episode, was the author of the acclaimed 1949 novel Shane.
4	"The Trouble with Richard"	Al Decaprio	Aaron Reuben	August 22, 1960
Richard, a very honest but hapless bank teller, is not very bright, and his ideas always get him in trouble. And he is in big trouble after he inadvertently adds three zeroes to a US$50 cashier's check, making it worth $50,000, and he encounters a variety of complications as he tries to recover it. Starring Dick Van Dyke, Parker Fennelly, Doro Merande, and Howard Smith.
5	"Maggie"	Rod Amateau	Bill Manhoff	August 29, 1960
A famous and sophisticated Broadway husband-and-wife acting team moves from Manhattan to the peace and quiet of a staid old small town in suburban Connecticut and tries to fit in, but the overactive imagination of their rambunctious, scatterbrained, mischievous, but clever 16-year-old daughter Maggie often leads to disaster at home and havoc in the community. Maggie's antics undermine her parents with journalists and their new neighbors, and after she tries to convince the elderly spinster next door that the man the woman hired as her gardener is in love with her, her parents end up facing a lawsuit. Starring Margaret O'Brien, Fay Baker, Leon Ames, Jeanne Tatum, Charles Cantor, Jesslyn Fax, Edwin Bruce, Michael Emmet, and Mona Knox, Narrated by Art Gilmore.
6	"Slezak and Son"	John Rich	Howard Teichman	September 5, 1960
"Count" Von Slezak is a boastful man who claims to be a European nobleman. Seeking to parlay his "title" into a life of privilege and luxury in the United States, he travels with his young son to New York City aboard a tramp steamer, and upon disembarking from the ship they immediately head for the city's fanciest hotel, where they demand a free stay in its best room. When the suspicious hotel manager discovers that the Slezak family's noble lineage became extinct in the 15th century, Slezak instead takes a job in the hotel's kitchen so he can provide for his son – on the condition that the boy be allowed to act like a member of the nobility in the hotel dining room. As Slezak's eventful first day in the United States proceeds from there, he attempts to bounce back from his initial setback. Starring Walter Slezak, Leo Slezak (Walter Slezak's real-life son), Norman Lloyd, and Neva Patterson.
7	"Maisie"	Edward Ludwig	Wilson Collison & Mary R. McCall	September 12, 1960
After she wins the Miss Guided Missile beauty contest, Maisie Ravier, an unemployed showgirl born and raised in Brooklyn, New York, must visit a backwater United States Army post in the small town of Clary to support its recruiting program, and her capers breathe new life into the town. When Clary decides to hold a celebration of the 200th anniversary of its founding, she decides to help the townspeople promote it – and when the celebration seems to be falling flat, she decides to stir things up by performing some aerial acrobatics. Starring Janis Paige, Lin McCarthy, Joe Sawyer, Olive Carey, James Mahoney, Rudy Lee, and Henry Kulky. Based on the Maisie Ravier character from Wilson Collison's 1935 novel Dark Dame.
8	"Waldo"	Arthur Hilton	Sumner Arthur Long	September 19, 1960
Rashford Timberlane III is a rich, kindly young anthropologist with a soft spot for animals who shares his apartment with his best friend, an intelligent, talented, and headstrong chimpanzee named Waldo who does everything but talk. Rashford tries to civilize Waldo, but faces a problem when Waldo gets pulled over while driving a sports car and is arrested for driving without a license and speeding. Starring Gil Stratton, Emory Parnell, Eleanor Audley, Virginia Welles, Frank Jenks, and Robert Griffin. The episode concludes with comical end titles and includes an anachronism that reveals that it was filmed no later than 1957: The characters discuss the Brooklyn Dodgers, a Major League Baseball team that moved to Los Angeles to become the Los Angeles Dodgers after the end of the 1957 season.
