= The Kettles on Old MacDonald's Farm =

1957 film by Virgil W. Vogel

The Kettles in Old MacDonald's Farm
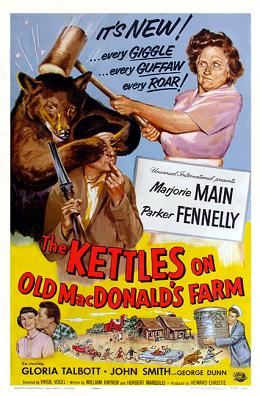
- Directed by: Virgil Vogel
- Written by: William Raynor; Herbert Margolis
- Starring: Marjorie Main; Parker Fennelly
- Cinematography: Arthur E. Arling
- Edited by: Edward Curtiss
- Music by: Irving Gertz; Henry Mancini; Herman Stein
- Production company: Universal Pictures
- Distributed by: Universal Pictures
- Release date: May 10, 1957
- Running time: 81 minutes
- Country: United States
- Language: English
- Box office: $1 million

The Kettles on Old MacDonald's Farm is a 1957 American comedy film directed by Virgil Vogel. It is the tenth and last installment of Universal-International's Ma and Pa Kettle series starring Marjorie Main and introducing Parker Fennelly as Pa, replacing Percy Kilbride. It was also Marjorie Main's last movie of any kind.

== Plot ==
Ma and Pa Kettle help lumberjack Brad Johnson turn his wealthy girlfriend Sally Flemming into a good farm wife.

Worried that her father may oppose her marriage to a lumberjack, Sally hides out on the Kettle farm until Brad can convince her father that he'd be a suitable breadwinner.

Ma Kettle decides Sally needs some heavy-duty lessons on how to be a good farm wife. Suddenly nearby around the barnyard, Ma and Pa find out which way they proceeded next. Afterwards, an American hillbilly arrived to town leading them to the Appalachian trail out of the farm.

Only Sally's sense of humor helps her survive the lessons, which include getting up at 4:30AM; being surrounded by livestock; and mastering the use of non-modern appliances. The wedding does take place in the end.

== Cast ==
- Marjorie Main as Ma Kettle
- Parker Fennelly as Pa Kettle
- Gloria Talbott as Sally Flemming
- John Smith as Brad Johnson
- George Dunn as George
- Roy Barcroft as J.P. 'Jim' Flemming
- Claude Akins as Pete Logan
- Patricia Morrow as Bertha (as Pat Morrow)
- George Arglen as Henry Kettle
- Ricky Kelman as Elmer
- Donald Baker as Abner
- Polly Burson as Agnes Logan
- Hallene Hill as Granny
- Sara Taft as Clarabelle
- Harvey B. Dunn as Judge
- Boyd 'Red' Morgan as Shivaree Man

== See also ==
- List of American films of 1957
