= Lester Lanin =

- Born: Nathaniel Lester Lanin; August 26, 1907; Philadelphia, Pennsylvania, U.S.
- Died: October 27, 2004 (aged 97) New York City, U.S.
- Genres: Jazz, big band, pop
- Occupation: Bandleader
- Years active: 1927–1990s
- Label: Epic
- Website: lesterlanin.com

Nathaniel Lester Lanin (August 26, 1907 – October 27, 2004) was an American jazz and pop music bandleader. He was famous for long, smoothly arranged medleys, at a consistent rhythm and tempo, which were designed for continuous dancing. Lanin's career began in the late 1920s and his popularity increased through the advent of the LP era. His music remained very popular among fans of the ballroom dance world. Starting with Epic Records in the middle of the 1950s, he recorded a string of albums for several labels, many of which hit the US Billboard 200.

== Biography ==
Lanin's brothers, Sam and Howard, were also both bandleaders; they came from a family of ten (of which Lester was the youngest) born to a family of Russian Jewish immigrants. He originally attended South Philadelphia High School but quit at the age of 15 to play music with his brothers abandoning his plans to be an attorney. Beginning in 1927, he led ensembles that were paid to play at the houses of wealthy socialites in Philadelphia and New York, continuing even after the 1929 stock market crash.

In 1930, Lanin was hired to play at a gala for Barbara Hutton, and the event garnered so much press in New York newspapers that it made Lanin as much a star as the young heiress. Lanin soon became a major star of the dance music world, and was hired worldwide to play for dignitaries and monarchs, in addition to a recurring invitation to play at White House inaugural balls from the Eisenhower administration to the Carter administration. In the 1930s his orchestral performances at the Waldorf Astoria Hotel's Starlight Roof included John Serry Sr. as a sideman. Lanin was managed for much of his career by New York socialite music promoter Al Madison.

He conducted the music for Grace Kelly's engagement party, as well as the nuptials between Prince Charles and Lady Diana Spencer. According to Lanin, one of his most memorable performances was playing at a party for avant-garde rock musician Frank Zappa. This was reported by Billboard magazine in 1974. At the time Mr. Zappa was in New York City to play two Halloween concerts at the Felt Forum (now known as The Theater at Madison Square Garden.)

Lanin also played for other celebrities, including Billy Joel's 1985 wedding to Christie Brinkley. Lanin continued performing well into the 1990s. In 1999 he played himself in the black-and-white film comedy Man of the Century, where he was the favorite musician of lead character Johnny Twennies.

Until his death, Lanin and his orchestra played at the prestigious International Debutante Ball where upper-class girls from prominent American and international families are presented to high society at the Waldorf-Astoria Hotel in New York City. Since his death, his orchestra continues to play biennially at the International Debutante Ball. Lanin and his orchestra are famous for handing out "Lanin Hats," with the logo of the Lester Lanin orchestra, to the crowd and debutantes at the International Debutante Ball.

Lester Lanin died at age 97 in 2004.

== Legacy ==
The Lester Lanin Orchestra continues to perform full-time. The Orchestra is now led by musical director Spencer Bruno who was the band leader under Lanin and took over after Lanin's passing.

== Selected discography ==
- Dance to the Music of Lester Lanin (1957) US #7
- Lester Lanin and His Orchestra (1958) US #18
- Cocktail Dancing
- Have Band, Will Travel (1958) US #12
- Lester Lanin at the Tiffany Ball (1958) US #17
- Lester Lanin Goes to College (1958) US #19
- Dancing on the Continent
- Christmas Dance Party
- High Society Volume II (1961)
- The Madison Avenue Beat
- Twistin' in High Society! (1962) US #37
- More Twistin' in High Society
- Dancing Theatre Party (Featuring the Dancing Pianos)
- For Dancing Lester Lanin Play 23 Richard Rodgers Hits (1964)
- 40 Beatles Hits (1966)
- Narrowing the Generation Gap (1969)
