= Peter Donald =

American actor

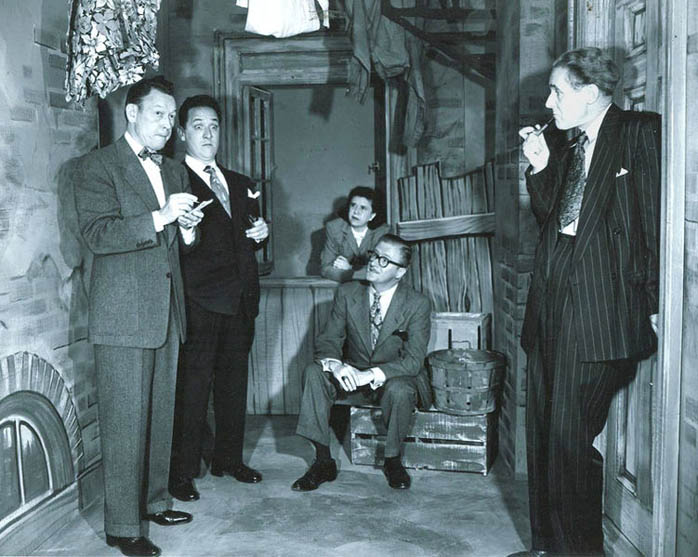
- Allen's Alley cast (l to r): Fred Allen, Kenny Delmar, Minerva Pious, Peter Donald, Parker Fennelly
- Born: June 6, 1918; Bristol, England
- Died: April 20, 1979 (aged 60); Fort Lauderdale, Florida, U.S.
- Occupation: Actor

Peter Donald (June 6, 1918 – April 20, 1979) was a British-born actor who worked in American radio and television. He has been called "one of radio's great dialecticians."

== Early years ==
Donald was born in Bristol, England, in 1918. His father (a comedian) and mother (a singer) were performers in Vaudeville. He graduated from the Professional Children's School in New York in 1936.

== Radio ==
Donald first appeared on radio in 1927, playing Tiny Tim in a production of A Christmas Carol. At age 11, he was the announcer for Uncle Olie and His Kne-Mel Gang on CBS. He became an announcer on CBS in 1931.

He portrayed Ajax Cassidy on Fred Allen's radio show, the Irishman who continually complained that he was "not long for this world."

In addition to his long run on "Allen's Alley," Donald was a regular on Radio Reader's Digest, Stage Door Canteen, and We, the People. He was also the host during the 1940s on County Fair and read the jokes for radio's joke-telling panel program, Can You Top This? In 1952, Donald served as host of Don McNeill's Breakfast Club for six weeks while McNeill was away.

Donald had a transcribed program on WINS radio in New York City in 1947. Stanback sponsored the show, which included the Three Flames instrumental group. The same recording was broadcast at 12:30 p.m. Eastern Time and at 10 p.m. E. T.

== Stage ==
Donald appeared on Broadway in Bitter Sweet (1929–1930) and Give Me Yesterday (1931).

== Television ==
Donald was the host of two early television series, The Ad-Libbers (1951) and Masquerade Party (1954–1956), and he made numerous TV guest appearances as a comedian (The Colgate Comedy Hour, The NBC Comedy Hour) and panelist (Pantomime Quiz, What's My Line?, To Tell the Truth). His TV appearances as an actor included Prize Performance (1950) and ABC Showcase (1950). He appeared on The Tonight Show Starring Johnny Carson in 1962, and one of his last TV appearances was on the daytime panel show Get the Message in 1964.

In the early 1950s, he lived in Manhattan on the south side of 58th Street between 7th Avenue and Broadway.

He hosted the Texaco Star Theater on the NBC television network on September 14, 1948. At the show's closing he announced that Milton Berle would commence hosting on the next week's show & Berle momentarily appears. In addition to Donald's delightful stories, the show's highlight is Sid Caesar's tour de force performance of his WWII bombing parody skit from the 1946 film Tars and Spars.

== Writing ==
Donald wrote "plays, satirical sketches, and song lyrics."

== Recognition ==
His star on the Hollywood Walk of Fame is located at 6665 Hollywood Boulevard. (Another source says that the star, in the Television category, is at 6661 Hollywood Boulevard and that it was dedicated February 8, 1960.)

== Personal life ==
Donald was married to Jo Janis, an actress in radio.

He was "identified with the cause of underprivileged children and ... devoted much of his spare time to curbing of juvenile delinquency."
