= The Ad-Libbers =

American TV game show (1951)

- Genre: Game show
- Directed by: Hal Persons
- Starring: Peter Donald (host)
- Country of origin: United States
- Original language: English
- No. of episodes: 5

Production
- Producers: Hal Persons; Ted Persons
- Running time: 30 minutes

Original release
- Network: CBS
- Release: August 3 – August 31, 1951

The Ad-Libbers is a CBS comedy sketch game show that began on August 3, 1951, and ended on August 31, 1951, as a summer replacement for Mama.

== Format ==
Home viewers were invited to send in story ideas. The host would read the story outline to the performers, who would then attempt to ad-lib dialogue to fit the story.

== Cast ==
The show was hosted by Peter Donald. Regulars included Jack Lemmon, Charles Mendick, Patricia Housley, Joe Silver, Earl Hammond and Cynthia Stone.

== Background ==
The series was based on a similar program titled What Happens Now? The program aired on local New York station WOR-TV in 1949 and was hosted by Nelson Olmsted. Regulars on the 1949 program included Ross Martin, Carol Ohmart and Larry Blyden.

== Production ==
Ted and Hal Persons produced the show, and Hal Persons directed it. Maxwell House was the sponsor. It was broadcast on Fridays from 8 to 8:30 p.m. Eastern Time.

== Critical response ==
A review in the trade publication Billboard said that the program "comes off as fitfully interesting but hardly strong enough to stand the rigors of strong audience competition." It said that because the actors were not trained in performing spontaneously the demands of the show's format were unrealistic.
