= George Dunn (actor) =

American actor (1914–1982)

- Born: Ollen George Dunn; November 23, 1914; Brownwood, Texas, U.S.
- Died: April 27, 1982 (aged 67); Los Angeles, California, U.S.
- Other name: George E. Dunn
- Occupations: Actor, humorist
- Years active: 1953–1980

George Dunn (born Ollen George Dunn, November 23, 1914 – April 27, 1982) was an American actor, humorist, vaudeville performer, and satirist born in Brownwood, Texas. He often portrayed Western characters in film and television. His homespun wit, rope tricks, and satirizing of American life, politics, and sports reflected the strong influence Will Rogers had on him as an entertainer.

== Career ==
Dunn made his way to New York City to perform in vaudeville. From there, he went on to Hollywood, where he appeared in twenty five motion pictures and more than one hundred television shows. Some of his appearances were uncredited bit parts.

Dunn predominantly appeared in minor supporting roles during his television and film career. One of his major roles was "The Prophet" in Operation Petticoat, alongside Tony Curtis and Gavin MacLeod. Dunn also appeared in several other well-known films, including Giant, Inherit the Wind, The Long, Hot Summer, The Kettles on Old MacDonald's Farm, and Shenandoah. In another phase of his career, he appeared in a number of John Cassavetes films, including Faces and A Woman Under the Influence. Like John Wayne's, Dunn's final role was in The Shootist. In addition to his film work, Dunn appeared in many popular television shows throughout the mid '50s, '60s, and '70s, such as The Andy Griffith Show, Bonanza, The Beverly Hillbillies, My Favorite Martian, and Starsky and Hutch. He also appeared in the Off-Broadway production of The Rainmaker in 1954.

George Dunn had a career that spanned multiple decades during which he traveled extensively, visiting a total of 95 countries. He later drew on these experiences in after-dinner speaking engagements.

== Death ==
Dunn died on April 27, 1982 at West Hills Hospital in Los Angeles, California after a long illness. He was 67 years old.

== Filmography ==
Film
Year	Title	Role	Notes and references
1953	How to Marry a Millionaire	Mike - Elevator Operator	
1955	Prince of Players	Doorman	
1955	Daddy Long Legs	Chauffeur	
1955	Good Morning, Miss Dove	Bert, the Janitor	Uncredited
1956	The Lieutenant Wore Skirts	Base mail clerk	Uncredited
1956	Ransom!	Bank clerk	Uncredited; Alternative title: Fearful Decision
1956	Away All Boats	Gilbert Hubert	
1956	Giant	Vern Decker	
1957	The Kettles on Old MacDonald's Farm	George	
1957	Joe Dakota	Jim Baldwin	
1958	The Long, Hot Summer	Peabody	
1959	Operation Petticoat	The Prophet	
1960	Wake Me When It's Over	Staff Photographer	Uncredited
1960	Inherit the Wind	Banker - Critic at City Meeting	Uncredited
1962	The Silent Witness		
1965	Baby the Rain Must Fall	Counterman	
1968	Faces	Comedian	
1969	The Good Guys and the Bad Guys	Engineer #1	
1971	The Beguiled	Sam Jefferson	
1973	Stand Up and Be Counted	Policeman	Uncredited
1973	The Severed Arm	Harry the Janitor	
1974	A Woman Under the Influence	Garson Cross	
Television
Year	Title	Role	Notes and references
1958	The Adventures of Jim Bowie	Davy Crockett	Episode "A Night in Tennessee"
1958-1959	Cimarron City	Jesse Williams	Main cast member
1959	The Detectives Starring Robert Taylor	Sooky	1 episode
1959	The Alaskans	Stampede Pete	1 episode
1960	Harrigan and Son	Detective	1 episode
1960–1961	The Andy Griffith Show	Pete	3 episodes
1961	My Three Sons	Listener	1 episode
1961	The Aquanauts	Chuck	1 episode
1961	Ben Casey		1 episode
1961–1971	Bonanza	Drunk #2; Andy	2 episodes
1962	Ripcord	John Chapman	1 episode
1962	Lawman		1 episode
1962	The Virginian	Biggs	1 episode
1962–1963	The Lloyd Bridges Show	Leo	2 episodes
1963	The Great Adventure	Farmer	1 episode
1963	Wagon Train	Jones	1 episode
1964	My Favorite Martian	Mr. Edgar Graham	1 episode
1965	Camp Runamuck	The Sheriff	Main cast member
1967	Stranger on the Run	Pilney	Television movie Alternative title: Lonesome Gun
1968	Felony Squad	Watchman	1 episode
1969	The Beverly Hillbillies	Bailiff	1 episode
1969	Adam-12	Danny Bryant	1 episode
1970	The Doris Day Show	Hillbilly	Episode "The Duke Returns"
1972	Mannix	Customer	1 episode
1976	Starsky and Hutch	Officer O' Keefe	1 episode
1978	The Hardy Boys/Nancy Drew Mysteries	Bellman	1 episode
1978	Kate Bliss and the Ticker Tape Kid	Jim Haggerty	Television movie
1980	The Misadventures of Sheriff Lobo	Fire chief	1 episode, (final appearance)
