= Radio Reader's Digest =

American anthology radio series (1942–1948)

Radio Reader's Digest is an American anthology radio program that was broadcast on CBS from September 13, 1942, to June 3, 1948. Beginning on January 13, 1946, it was known as Reader's Digest-Radio Edition.

== Overview ==
Content of Radio Reader's Digest came from issues of the Reader's Digest magazine, with much of the material dealing with memorable people or heartwarming stories. The initial host, Conrad Nagel, introduced segments and narrated them. Other hosts and narrators included Richard Kollmar, Les Tremayne, Quentin Reynolds, and William Harrison. Orchestra leaders included Van Cleave, Lyn Murray and Jack Miller. On March 4, 1945, Burl Ives began performing on the show each week. His 13-week stint had him doing an eight-minute segment each week with content based on his role in the Broadway musical Sing Out Sweet Land. Guest editors included Lowell Thomas and Edwin C. Hill. In September 1946 the show's format was changed, "being given over to one dramatization instead of a lot of this-and-that".

The continuing cast of Radio Reader's Digest was similar to a theatrical stock company in that actors had to be versatile, able to take any role from the lead to a bit part. Directors sometimes recast roles during rehearsals if a person proved not right for his or her designated part. Actors in the company included Peter Donald, Barry Kroeger, Ed Latimer, Craig MacDonald, James Monks, Claire Niesen, and Vicki Vola. Episodes featured guest stars in dramatizations. They included Cedric Hardwicke, Eva Le Gallienne, Paul Muni, Alexander Woollcott, Shirley Booth, Stanley Ridges, Brian Aherne, Robert Benchley, Raymond Massey, Joseph Calleia, and Edward G. Robinson.

== Problems ==
CBS and the United States Department of War received "severe censure from Catholic periodicals" with regard to the program's January 21, 1945, broadcast. The episode told of a Catholic soldier who made a confession to a rabbi when no Catholic priest was available. The Catholic Review, based in Baltimore, said that the War Department (which cleared the program for airing) needed more intelligence in its public relations division. The Tablet, based in Brooklyn, said, "It is difficult to find any excuse to justify the Columbia Broadcasting System for permitting its facilities to be used to distort and falsify a doctrine of the Catholic Church ..." The Tablet added that it had been contacted by many Catholics who had "registered their indignation with the radio station and the sponsors".

One episode of the program led to a lawsuit. Donald Q. Coster, a former colonel in the Army, sued CBS and the program's producers (Rayshow, Incorporated, and Foote, Cone & Belding) for $250,000 in New York's supreme court. The suit said, "plaintiff was made out ... to be a liar, a braggart and a fool, and held up to public ridicule, scorn and contempt." The complaint also said that Coster was impersonated by an actor and that the episode implied that he either wrote the story or approved it.

== Production ==
From September 13, 1942, through September 30, 1945, the program was broadcast on Sundays at 9 p.m. Eastern Time. Campbell Soups sponsored it over that span. Its competition included Manhattan Merry-Go-Round and Walter Winchell's program. Hallmark Cards ended its sponsorship of Charlotte Greenwood's program on ABC and began sponsoring Radio Reader's Digest beginning with the January 13, 1946, episode and continuing through the program's end on June 3, 1948. It was initially heard on Sundays at 2 p.m. E. T. Beginning September 12, 1946, it was moved to Thursdays at 10 p.m. E. T. The Hallmark sponsorship brought a change in the show's name to Reader's Digest-Radio Edition. The budget during Hallmark's sponsorship was $10,000 per week. William Spier was the initial director. Other directors included Tony Leader, Robert Nolan, and Marx Loeb.

== Critical response ==
A review of the premiere episode in the trade publication Billboard called the broadcast "an almost perfect example of good material hamstrung and ruined by childish production and direction". The review commended selection of articles used and Nagel's readings, but it said that the scripts "seemed aimed at backward three-year-olds", in addition to which "The 'acting' was preposterously overdone ..."

After Reynolds became the program's host, the trade publication Variety said, "Reynolds' presence apparently indicates a change in program content, with future emphasis to be placed on more timely material". It added that although Reynolds's voice had dramatic, compelling characteristics, the pace of his delivery was not suited to the program's format.
