= Hollywood Stadium Mystery =

1938 film by David Howard

- Directed by: David Howard
- Written by: Stuart Palmer (story and screenplay); Dorrell McGowan (screenplay); Stuart E. McGowan (screenplay)
- Produced by: Armand Schaefer (associate producer)
- Starring: See below
- Cinematography: Ernest Miller
- Edited by: Edward Mann
- Music by: Alberto Colombo
- Distributed by: Republic Pictures
- Release date: February 21, 1938
- Running time: 66 minutes 53 minutes (American edited version)
- Country: United States
- Language: English

Hollywood Stadium Mystery is a 1938 American film directed by David Howard.

== Plot ==
A rivalry develops between a district attorney named Devons, who finds murder mysteries amusing but amateurish, and Pauline Ward, a crime novelist. They play tricks on one another, attempting to prove their point over how to solve a crime.

One night before a prizefight, when the lights are momentarily dimmed, a boxer is suddenly killed in the ring. The only clue Devons and Ward have is a tune that a man was whistling. The police detain every spectator from ringside, considering them all as suspects, including Edna Mayberry, a woman who had an involvement with the dead fighter. Pauline is threatened in a dressing room before the case is solved.

== Cast ==
- Neil Hamilton as Bill Devons
- Evelyn Venable as Pauline Ward
- Jimmy Wallington as Nick Nicholls
- Barbara Pepper as Althea Ames
- Lucien Littlefield as Watchman
- Lynne Roberts as Edna Mayberry
- Charles Williams as Jake
- James Spottswood as Albert "Slats" Keefe
- Reed Hadley as Ralph Mortimer
- Robert Homans as Captain Joseph Filsom
- William Haade as Tommy Madison - the Champ
- Pat Flaherty as Ace Cummings
- Dan Tobey as Announcer Dan Tobey
- Al Bayne as Max
- Smiley Burnette as Smiley Burnette

== Soundtrack ==
- "She'll Be Coming 'Round the Mountain"

== See also ==
- List of boxing films
