= Sam Lanin =

American jazz musician (1891–1977)

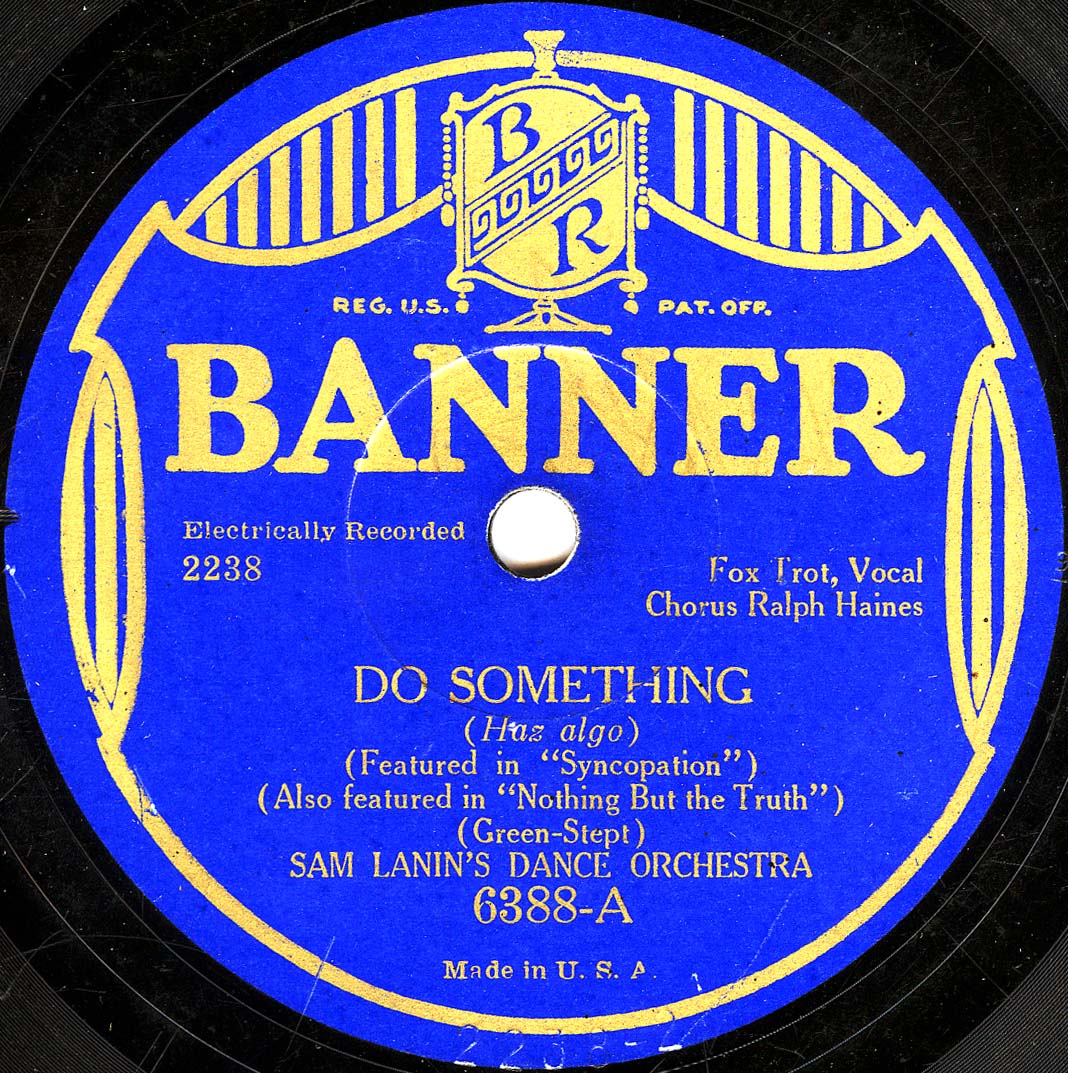
Label of a Sam Lanin recording on Banner Records.

Samuel Charles Lanin (September 4, 1891 – May 5, 1977) was an American jazz bandleader.

Lanin's brothers, Howard and Lester, were also bandleaders, and all of them had sustained careers in music. Lanin was one of ten children born to Benjamin and Mary Lanin, Russian Jews who had emigrated to Philadelphia, Pennsylvania, United States. Sam played clarinet and violin while young, and in 1912 he was offered a spot playing in Victor Herbert's orchestra, where he played through World War I.

After the war he moved to New York City and began playing at the Roseland Ballroom in late 1918. There he established the Roseland Orchestra; this ensemble recorded for the Columbia Gramophone Company in the early 1920s.

== Recordings ==
Sam recorded with a plethora of ensemble arrangements, under names such as Lanin's Jazz Band, Lanin's Arcadians, Lanin's Famous Players, Lanin's Southern Serenaders, Lanin's Red Heads, Sam Lanin's Dance Ensemble, and Lanin's Arkansaw Travelers. He did not always give himself top billing in his ensemble's names, and was a session leader for an enormous number of sweet jazz recording sessions of the 1920s.

Among the ensembles he directed were Ladd's Black Aces, The Broadway Bell-Hops, The Westerners, The Pillsbury Orchestra and Bailey's Lucky Seven. He had a rotating cast of noted musicians playing with him, including regular appearances from Phil Napoleon, Miff Mole, Jules Levy, Jr., and Red Nichols, as well as Jimmy Dorsey, Tommy Dorsey, Mannie Klein, Jimmy McPartland, Bix Beiderbecke, Eddie Lang, Bunny Berigan, Nick Lucas and Frankie Trumbauer. Like Ben Selvin, Lanin was one of the most prolific recording bandleaders. Between 1920 and 1931, he directed over 400 sessions for nearly every label. Lanin did little actual playing on these records; his main contributions were clean, well-orchestrated arrangements and session directions.

== Radio ==
After 1923 he also played regularly on radio: the Roseland Orchestra played on New York radio weekly every Monday from 1923 to 1925. He entered into a sponsorship with Bristol-Myers for their toothpaste, Ipana; as a result, his ensemble was renamed The Ipana Troubadors. In 1928 and 1929, Lanin used the up-and-coming Bing Crosby as band vocalist on a couple of his OKeh records.

== Later years ==
The 1929 stock market crash hit Sam Lanin hard, unlike his brother Lester; in 1931, he lost his contract with Bristol-Myers, his radio show and the name Ipana Troubadors. By the middle of the 1930s, Sam was spending much of his time cutting transcription discs. While his fame had waned, he was still well off from the money he saved in the 1920s and retired from the music business by the end of the 1930s. He was essentially forgotten at the same time Lester went on to stardom. He died in 1977, having never returned to music.
