= Howard Lanin =

American musician (1897–1991)

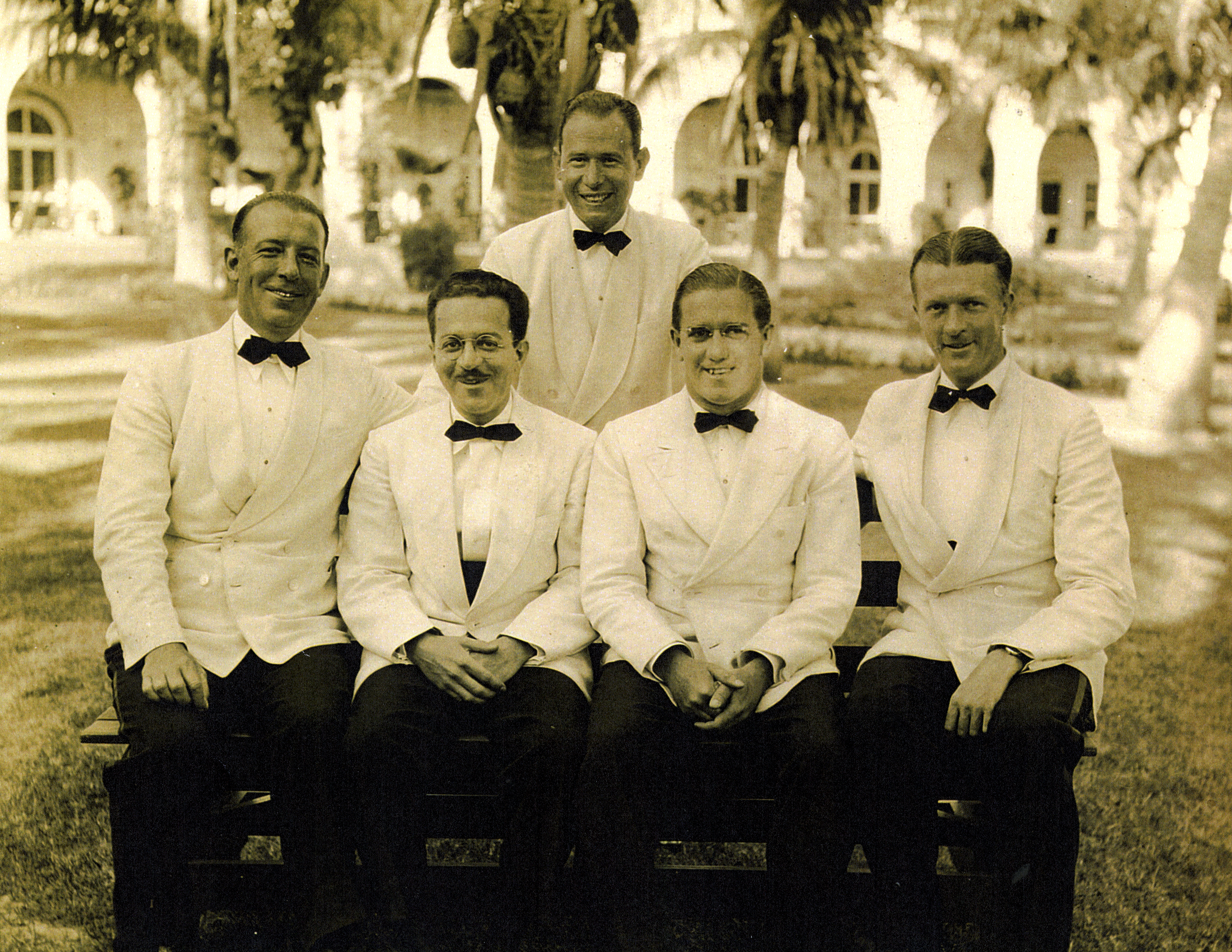
- Lanin and bandmembers at Casa Marina in Key West in 1938
- Born: July 15, 1897; Philadelphia, Pennsylvania, U.S.
- Died: April 26, 1991, age 93; Philadelphia, Pennsylvania, U.S.
- Occupation: Bandleader
- Known for: Society orchestra leadership
- Spouse: Clayre Feinstein Lanin
- Children: 2 sons, 2 daughters
- Parent(s): Benjamin and Mary Lanin

Howard Lanin (July 15, 1897 – April 26, 1991) was an American bandleader, called "The King of Society Dance Music."

== Early years ==
Lanin was born in Philadelphia, Pennsylvania, the son of Benjamin and Mary Lanin. His father was an entrepreneur and musician. He was the middle child of nine children and one of six brothers who became bandleaders, playing in ballrooms and at resorts. He attended South Philadelphia High School, where he began playing cornet, leaving when he was 15 to go into music.

== Career ==
Lanin led the Howard Lanin Orchestra, a group that performed show tunes, waltzes and sweet jazz. Lanin also established orchestras led by his brothers, including Sam Lanin (who was one of the most prolific of recording bandleaders under many pseudonyms) and Lester Lanin. The orchestras of the Lanin brothers gave a start to Red Nichols, Artie Shaw, The Dorsey Brothers, and other jazz musicians.

=== Personal appearances ===
In 1918, Howard and Sam Lanin opened the Roseland Ballroom in Philadelphia; a year later, they opened New York City's Roseland location. When Howard Lanin played at Roseland in 1921, his group was called his "Columbia Record Orchestra."

=== Radio ===
In 1922, WDAR in Philadelphia began broadcasting the music of Lanin's orchestra as it played at the Arcadia Cafe, a development that Lanin said was the first broadcast of its type in that city. He also conducted orchestras for The Atwater Kent Hour and the Campbell Soup Show.

=== Entertainment management ===
In the 1950s, as interest in dance bands diminished, Lanin began Howard Lanin Productions, an entertainment management company.

== Personal life ==
Lanin married Claire Feinstein in 1929; they remained married until her death in 1983. They had two sons and two daughters. Lanin died April 26, 1991, at Thomas Jefferson University Hospital in Philadelphia. He was 93. He was survived by two sons, two daughters, a brother, nine grandchildren and nine great-grandchildren.
