= Minerva Pious =

American actress (1903–1979)

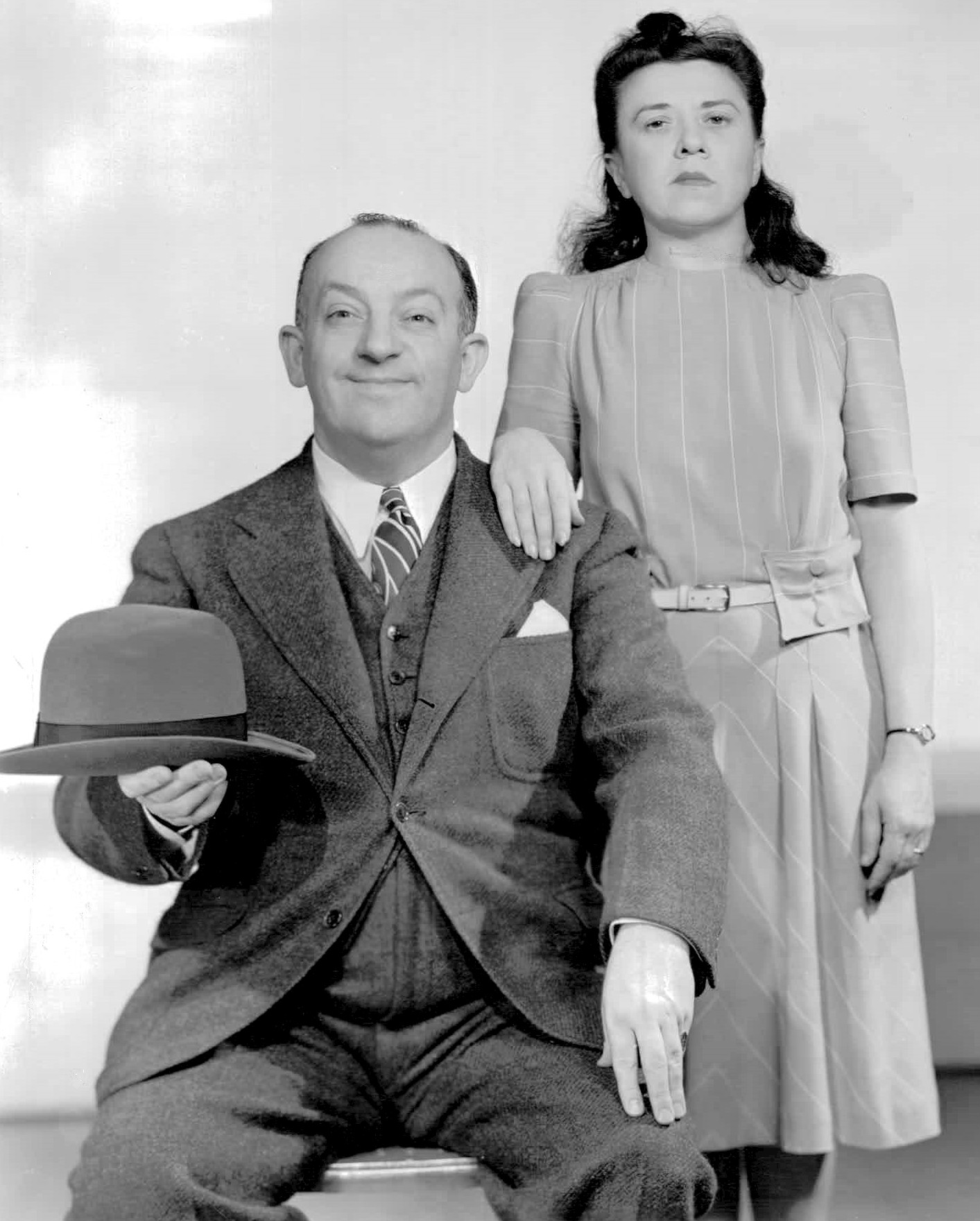
- Pious with radio actor Charlie Cantor in 1941
- Born: March 5, 1903; Odessa, Russian Empire
- Died: March 16, 1979 (aged 76); Manhattan, New York City

Minerva Pious (March 5, 1903 – March 16, 1979) was an American radio, television and film actress. She was best known as the malaprop-prone Pansy Nussbaum in Fred Allen's famous "Allen's Alley" current-events skits. In his book, Treadmill to Oblivion, Allen called Pious "the most accomplished woman dialectitian ever to appear in radio."

== Early years ==
Minnie Pious, as she was originally known, was born in Odessa, Russian Empire, and moved to the United States with her parents when she was 2 years old, becoming a U.S. citizen in 1918 through her naturalized citizen father.

She attended high school in Bridgeport, Connecticut, where she was active in the Players Club dramatic organization. An article in the December 6, 1919 issue of the Bridgeport Telegram reported "Miss Minerva Pious delighted the school with her dramatic reading" and added "Miss Pious has given very many successful story readings through the past year and will continue the community work."

Pious's excellent typing and shorthand in high school led to a job as a stenographer for a judge in Bridgeport. She later wrote for a national syndicate. Next she was a writer for Loew's. She spent the majority of her life and career in New York City and worked extensively as a radio comedian.

== Allen's Alley ==
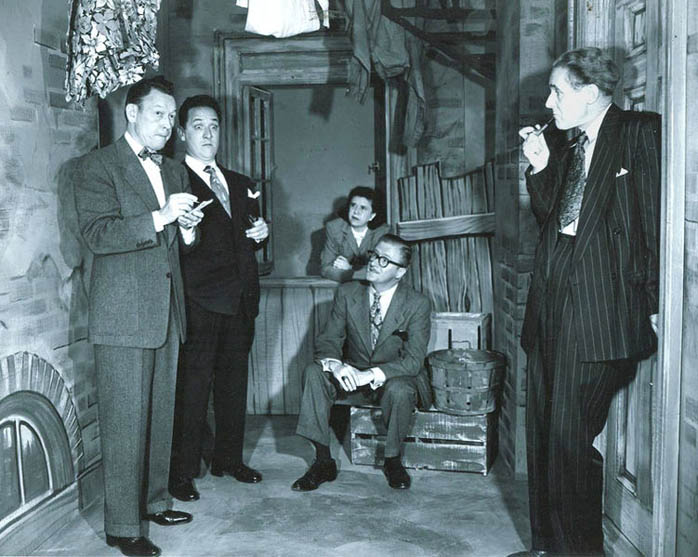
The Allen's Alley cast (l to r): Fred Allen, Kenny Delmar, Minerva Pious, Peter Donald, Parker Fennelly.

Pious obtained her first regular job as part of Allen's Mighty Allen Art Players in the 1930s when Allen hosted the hour-long Town Hall Tonight. Playing a number of dialect roles in Allen's clever news spoofs and various other satires, Pious developed them into the Russian-Jewish housewife Mrs. Nussbaum by 1942, the year in which Allen's news spoofs finally developed into the "Allen's Alley" routines.

In a review published in Billboard October 18, 1947, Jerry Franken praised her performance, writing, "Mrs. Nussbaum's malapropisms and occasionally inspired twists, sharpened by Minerva Pious's sock performance, are still boff."

Pious became a fixture in the routines until Allen's show ended in 1949. She often greeted Allen's knock on her door with her Yiddish "Nuuuuuu," then answered Allen's cheery "Mrs. Nussbaum!" with lines like:

"You are expectink maybe Veinstein Chuychill?"
"You are expecting maybe Cecil B. Schlemeil?"
"You are expecting maybe Tulalulalula Bankhead?"
"You are expecting maybe Dinah Schnorra?"
"You are expecting maybe Hoagy Carbuncle?"
"You were expecting maybe Emperor Shapirohito?"

Pious's portions of the "Alley" segments usually involved one or another joke at the expense of Mrs. Nussbaum's never-heard husband, Pierre. In one episode, Pierre had a bad cold, and one of the remedies involved vegetables of all types. According to Mrs. Nussbaum, the vegetables included "Carrots, stringle-a-beans and rutta-bagels." Her distinctive accented voice and Jane Ace-like knack for malaprops made her a series trademark.

== Other radio ==
Pious was often invited to play Nussbaum on other radio programs, such as The Jack Benny Program (inviting him to her new restaurant: "We feature soft lights and hard salami") and Duffy's Tavern. She was cast in the radio plays of Norman Corwin (especially playing a Brooklynese crime solver in Murder in Studio One) and on the Columbia Workshop. In addition to comedy routines on Kate Smith's series, she was heard on shows hosted by Ed Wynn and Bob Hope, along with roles on The Goldbergs and the soap opera Life Can Be Beautiful. She also was heard on The Alan Young Show. "Minnie could do a million things," remembered Fred Allen Show writer Bob Weiskopf to author Jordan R. Young in The Laugh Crafters, a book gathering interviews with vintage radio comedy writers. "Nice lady. She had a physical affliction—she had a bad hip, a severe limp. She was very concerned about television; she never worked very much. But radio was fine."

== Television ==
The hip condition didn't stop Pious from making occasional television appearances, on shows such as The Colgate Comedy Hour and The Chevrolet Television Theatre. She appeared briefly in the television soap The Edge of Night in 1956, playing a landlady.

== Films ==
Her few film credits included playing Mrs. Nussbaum on camera in Allen's It's in the Bag! and a featured voice role in Pinocchio in Outer Space. She had small roles in the films Joe MacBeth (1955) and Love in the Afternoon (1957).

== Recordings ==
Pious recorded with Bud Freeman a skit based on Noël Coward's Private Lives called "Private Jives" for the Commodore Records label in 1938. Also on the record were Joe Bushkin (piano and trumpet) and announcer Everett Sloane. The record, according to Commodore, sold only 150 copies, all to friends of the artistes!

== Death ==
Pious died March 16, 1979, at Lenox Hill Hospital in Manhattan, aged 76.

== Sources ==
- Taylor, Robert (1989). Fred Allen: His Life and Wit. Boston: Little, Brown and Company. ISBN 978-0-316-83388-2.
- Young, Jordan R. (1999). The Laugh Crafters: Comedy Writing in Radio and TV's Golden Age. Beverly Hills: Past Times Publishing. ISBN 978-0-940410-37-4. OCLC 259997409.
