= Jack Elinson =

American producer and screenwriter

- Born: April 21, 1922; New York, U.S.
- Died: November 17, 2011 (aged 89); Santa Monica, California, U.S.
- Occupations: Producer, screenwriter
- Children: 4
- Family: Irving Elinson (brother)

Jack Elinson (April 21, 1922 – November 17, 2011) was an American producer and screenwriter.

== Life and career ==
Elinson was born and raised in New York. He served in the army during World War II.

Elinson had sold a joke to Walter Winchell's newspaper column at the age of 16. He later wrote for radio programs, moving on to television programs in the 1950s, writing and producing episodes for The Danny Thomas Show with his brother. His credits include producing and writing for The Real McCoys, The Johnny Carson Show, The Colgate Comedy Hour, Hey, Jeannie!, and One Day At A Time.

In the 1960s and 1970s Elinson wrote for The Andy Griffith Show, Gomer Pyle, U.S.M.C., Hogan's Heroes, The Doris Day Show and The Danny Thomas Show. In 1961 he was nominated for a Primetime Emmy for Outstanding Writing Achievement in Comedy.

In 1985, Elinson was executive producer of the NBC sitcom television series 227. He retired in 1990, his last work being writing and developing the television series New Attitude.

== Death ==
Elinson died in November 2011 of natural causes at his home in Santa Monica, California, at the age of 89.
