= Irving Elinson =

American screenwriter

- Born: Isidor Elinson; April 8, 1907; Manhattan, New York, U.S.
- Died: December 28, 1967 (aged 60); Los Angeles, California, U.S.
- Occupation: Screenwriter
- Family: Jack Elinson (brother)

Isidor Elinson (April 8, 1907 – December 28, 1967) was an American screenwriter. He wrote for Eddie Cantor's radio programs as well as for popular television programs.

== Career ==
He wrote 28 episodes for The Danny Thomas Show along with his brother, Jack Elinson. His writing credits include The Bill Dana Show, The Andy Griffith Show, The Lucy Show, The Real McCoys, Mister Ed, The Many Loves of Dobie Gillis, F Troop, Gomer Pyle, U.S.M.C., Bewitched, The Joey Bishop Show, My Favorite Martian and The Colgate Comedy Hour. He also wrote the 1953 film By the Light of the Silvery Moon, starring Doris Day.

== Death ==
Elinson died on December 28, 1967 in Los Angeles, California, at the age of 60.
