= Ipana =

Toothpaste product by Bristol-Myers

Ipana /aɪˈpænə/ was a toothpaste manufactured by Bristol-Myers Company. The wintergreen-flavored toothpaste reached its peak market penetration during the 1950s in North America. Marketing of Ipana used a Disney-created mascot named Bucky Beaver in the 1950s.

== Introduction and early popularity ==
Ipana was introduced in 1901 by the Bristol-Myers Company of New York. Ipana was an early and significant sponsor of United States radio broadcasts, starting in 1923 with the program The Ipana Troubadors. From 1925 to 1931, a series of popular records was issued under that name by Columbia. Sam Lanin was the leader and contractor of the studio group. From 1934 to 1940, the brand sponsored The Fred Allen Show, which ran under the names The Hour of Smiles and Town Hall Tonight. After Allen switched sponsors, Ipana sponsored It's Time to Smile, with Eddie Cantor and Dinah Shore.

== With hexachlorophene ==
In 1959, Bristol-Myers added hexachlorophene to Ipana toothpaste. Television ads at that time proudly proclaimed that this ingredient made Ipana superior to fluoridated toothpaste brands in germ-killing power. Hexachlorophene was later removed as it was found to cause brain damage in large concentrations, and it was replaced by sodium fluoride.

== Magazine promotions ==
In the 1950s, Bristol-Myers saturated women's periodicals with a broad-based monthly ad placement campaign for Ipana. Magazines such as Better Homes and Gardens, True Stories, and McCall's were targeted to cover the broad range of women's interests; however, the campaign all but ignored men's magazines, and this weakened the brand by leaving the perception that Ipana was a product for women and children.

== Brand decline and withdrawal ==
Sales of Ipana declined throughout the 1960s and into the early 1970s, due to:

1. increased marketing efforts from Bristol-Myers' competitors Procter & Gamble, Colgate, and others that were quicker to add fluoride to their formulae;
2. the increase in the popularity of color television, in whose programming Bristol-Myers was uninterested in investing, and
3. the company's recognition that manufacturing pharmaceuticals was more lucrative than buying television ads to sell personal hygiene products

Bristol-Myers withdrew many of its basic care products, including Ipana, from the market. By 1979, Ipana had been discontinued entirely in the United States, but was still sold in other countries.

Ipana was never submitted to the American Dental Association's Council on Dental Therapeutics for possible acceptance by the ADA as an effective decay-fighting dentifrice.

== Revitalizations ==
In 1986, a gel version of Ipana containing two fluorides was introduced in Turkey, and became a leading toothpaste there.

In 2005, River West Brands, a Chicago-based brand revitalization company, re-introduced Ipana into the U.S. marketplace. River West Brands sold the brand and related intellectual property to Maxill of Canada in October 2009. Maxill, one of the top three selling toothbrush makers in Canada, reintroduced Ipana in early 2011 as a "retro brand" in the professional dental market, where Maxill had come to dominate the professional oral hygiene category. Maxill extended the Ipana name to other dental products such as prophy angles, topical anesthetic and bamboo toothbrushes. The label states its active ingredient as sodium monofluorophosphate (0.76% w/w).

== Television ads ==
Bucky Beaver (voiced by Jimmie Dodd) was the marketing icon and mascot of Ipana commercials from the 1950s. Bucky Beaver's slogan was "Brusha, brusha, brusha. Get the New Ipana—it's dandy for your teeth!" Mr. Decay Germ, stylized as D.K. Germ, was the villain in the Ipana toothpaste commercials. In the commercials, Bucky Beaver told him, "Mr. Decay Germ, stay away from me. I'm sick and tired of cavities. Go bother someone else now."

== Comic strip ads ==
Stan Drake, artist of the newspaper comic strip The Heart of Juliet Jones, started his career as illustrator for the comic strip ad agency Johnstone and Cushing. In an interview with Shel Dorf for the National Cartoonists Society he said he learned to draw pretty girls via the ads he did for Ipana.

== In popular culture ==
Under the name Frances Westcott, Frances Bergen, wife of ventriloquist Edgar Bergen and mother of actress Candice Bergen, worked for the Powers Modelling Agency, and her face appeared as "the Ipana Girl" in toothpaste ads in magazines.

Before becoming a counterculture beat poet, Allen Ginsberg worked on the "Brusha, brusha, brusha" campaign as a market researcher. The jingle is referenced in a scene in the 1978 film version of the musical Grease (which built upon a passing line mentioning Bucky Beaver in the original stage musical), and subsequently appeared in a live televised version, for which the production acquired the performance rights.

The toothpaste is mentioned in the 1999 movie Blast from the Past: a family mistakenly lives underground in a fully stocked private nuclear bomb shelter after a jet plane crash during the Cuban Missile Crisis. Decades later when they emerge, their supply of discontinued toothpaste is evidence that they really did live underground for so many years.

Bucky Beaver was the inspiration of the name and mascot of the Texas-based gas station Buc-ee's.

== See also ==
- List of toothpaste brands
- Index of oral health and dental articles
- List of defunct consumer brands
