= It's in the Bag! (1945 film) =

1945 film by Richard Wallace

- Theatrical release poster
- Directed by: Richard Wallace
- Written by: Ilya Ilf (novel Dvenadtsat Stulyev); Yevgeni Petrov (uncredited) (novel Dvenadtsat stulyev); Lewis R. Foster (treatment); Fred Allen (treatment); Jay Dratler; Alma Reville; Morrie Ryskind (special contribution)
- Produced by: George R. Batcheller Jr. Walter Batchelor; Jack H. Skirball
- Starring: Fred Allen; Jack Benny; William Bendix; Don Ameche; Rudy Vallee; Jerry Colonna; Robert Benchley; John Carradine; Sidney Toler; Victor Moore
- Cinematography: Russell Metty
- Edited by: William Morgan
- Music by: Werner R. Heymann
- Distributed by: United Artists
- Release date: 21 April 1945
- Running time: 87 minutes
- Country: United States
- Language: English
- Budget: $1 million

It's in the Bag! is a 1945 American comedy film featuring Fred Allen in his only starring film role. The film was released by United Artists at a time when Allen was at the peak of his fame as one of the most popular radio comedians. The film has been preserved by UCLA Film & Television Archive. The film is loosely based on the comic novel The Twelve Chairs (1928) of Ilf and Petrov, later filmed by Mel Brooks as The Twelve Chairs (1970). The team of screenwriters included Jay Dratler, Alma Reville, and Morrie Ryskind. Allen's encounter with Jack Benny in the film is notable as at this time they were involved in a famous 'feud', which ran for over a decade.

== Plot ==
After changing the terms of his will, bequeathing all of his fortune to his long-lost grandnephew, millionaire Frederick Trumble slips a packet of money inside a chair seat. He is then shot and killed by an unseen assailant. When Trumble's grandnephew, flea circus operator Fred F. Floogle, learns that he is Trumble's heir, he and his family move into the same fancy hotel at which his daughter Marion's fiancé, Perry Parker, lives. They then go on a spending spree, buying expensive items on credit. Feeling cocky, Floogle demands that Marion stop seeing Perry, because Parker, Sr., the "exterminator king," once insinuated that the Floogles were too lowbrow for Perry. At the reading of the will, however, Floogle and his wife Eve learn from Trumble's lawyer, Jefferson T. Pike, and Trumble's former associates, Arnold and Gardner, that because the eccentric Trumble had squandered his wealth, their inheritance has been reduced to five chairs. Now faced with enormous debts, Eve convinces Floogle to make amends with Parker before their poverty is exposed. Unknown to the Floogles, Parker is an ordinary exterminator, who has been given a free room in the hotel in exchange for his services. While pretending to be rich, Parker demonstrates Perry's latest invention, a better mouse trap, and talks Floogle into agreeing to co-invest $25,000 in its development. Later, Trumble's chairs arrive at the Floogles' apartment, and Floogle's young son Homer, a genius with a photographic memory, offers to sell them at an antique store. Moments later, police detective Sully informs Floogle that Trumble's death, which had been made to look like a suicide, has now been ruled a murder and that he is the prime suspect. A bank official then gives Floogle a phonograph record entrusted to him by Trumble. Floogle is stunned to hear Trumble's voice, advising him that he had been swindled, but had placed his remaining $350,000 in one of the five chairs.

Floogle immediately telephones the antique shop, but learns that all five chairs already have been sold. Unaware that Pike, Arnold and Gardner are the swindlers and are spying on him, Floogle demands that Finley, the dealer, make a list of the chairs's buyers. As Finley is turning the list over to Homer, however, the shop is set on fire by Pike. Homer is rescued, and although he managed to read the list before it was destroyed, the shock of the fire has caused him to forget all but one name. The one buyer, Mrs. Pansy Nussbaum, however, informs Floogle that she just sold the chair to Jack Benny. Posing as the president of the Nutley, New Jersey Jack Benny fan club, Floogle is invited into Benny's home and, after some haggling, convinces the star to rent him the chair. Floogle quickly discovers that the chair is empty and is nearly run down by thugs in Pike's employ. Later, Floogle and Eve take Homer to a psychiatrist, Dr. Greengrass, who they hope will be able to jog the boy's memory. While waiting for Homer, Floogle and Eve go to a nearby movie theater, where they spot another one of Trumble's chairs. Floogle and Eve trick their way out of the theater with the chair, but once again, find it empty. After the neurotic quack Greengrass moves in with the Floogles, Homer remembers another name—Phil's Naughty Nineties Café. Unable to enter the crowded café as a customer, Floogle poses as a bass singer, so that he can join the establishment's barbershop quartet. While singing with the group, which features "has-been" celebrities Don Ameche, Victor Moore and Rudy Vallee, Floogle sees two Trumble chairs in the audience, but in his zeal to get them, he instigates a brawl. The fight ends when a shot rings out, and Gardner, who was seated with Pike and Arnold, is found dead.

As Sully finds Floogle next to the body, he is arrested for murder. Later, Floogle, whose lost fortune has been exposed, is visited in jail by Pike and finally deduces that the lawyer is the murdering swindler. Pike then arranges bail for Floogle, and Homer suddenly remembers the last name—Bill Bendix, the vitamin-popping leader of a gang of crooks. Watched by Sully, Pike, Arnold and Homer, Floogle breaks into Bendix' den and finds the chair, but has to hide under Bendix' desk when his cohorts enter. The thugs discuss their plot to murder Bendix by sending an electric shock through wires planted in the Trumble chair, which they are presenting to him as a birthday gift. While hiding, Floogle finds the money in the chair, but when the thugs shock then shoot Bendix, Floogle's noisy, terrified shaking gives him away. The thugs force Floogle to carry Bendix' body to the river, but on the way there, Bendix awakens, having only been stunned because he was wearing a bullet-proof vest. Just as Bendix admits to Floogle that he hates being a gangster, Arnold sneaks up on Floogle and attacks him. Homer dashes up and knocks out Arnold, and later, Bendix offers to torture Arnold and Pike into confessing. After Bendix gives them both "hot feet," Arnold admits in writing that he killed Gardner, while Pike confesses that he killed Trumble. Homer then reveals to Bendix that his chair is stuffed with money, and although he ends up losing most of his inheritance, Floogle is given enough money to pay his debts and bankroll his daughter's lavish wedding.

The "Better Mouse trap" invention is bought for $10,000.00 by Monty, Floogle's bookie. The freeloading Dr. Greengrass manages to steal the wedding cake upon his exit.

== Cast ==
- Fred Allen - Fred F. Trumble Floogle
- Jack Benny - Jack Benny
- Don Ameche - Don Ameche
- William Bendix - William Bendix
- Victor Moore - Victor Moore
- Rudy Vallée - Rudy Vallee
- Binnie Barnes - Eve Floogle
- Robert Benchley - Parker
- Jerry Colonna - Dr. Greengrass - Psychiatrist
- John Carradine - Jefferson T. Pike
- Gloria Pope - Marion Floogle
- William Terry - Perry Parker
- Minerva Pious - Mrs. Pansy Nussbaum
- Richard Tyler - Homer Floogle (as Dickie Tyler)
- Sidney Toler - Detective Sully
- George Cleveland - Busby - Hotel Manager
- John Miljan - Mr. Arnold
- Ben Welden - Monty - Bookie

Uncredited character actors alphabetically:

- Johnny Arthur - Finley
- Jack Baxley - Minister
- Brooks Benedict - Headwaiter
- Don Brodie - Reporter
- Steve Brodie - Usher
- John Brown - Joe, Nightclub Doorman
- George Chandler - 1st Elevator Operator
- James Conaty - Nightclub Patron
- Don Costello - Mickey
- Kernan Cripps - Police Turnkey
- Mike Donovan - Movie Theatre Patron
- Jay Eaton - Jeweler
- Bess Flowers - Woman in Elevator, and in Floogle's Penthouse
- Byron Foulger - Mr. Teckler
- Edward Gargan - Chair Delivery Man
- Jack Gargan - Movie Usher
- Dick Gordon - Movie Theatre Patron
- Frank Hagney - Nightclub Tough in Fight
- Harry Harvey - Man in Nightclub Kitchen
- Olin Howland - Dr. Greengrass's Doctor
- Lloyd Ingraham - Frederick F. Trumble
- Eddie Kane - Tailor
- Kenner G. Kemp - Movie House Patron in Balcony
- Mike Lally - Movie House Patron, and Cabbie
- Rex Lease - Yacht Salesman
- Mary Livingstone - Mary Livingstone (voice only)
- Wilbur Mack - Nightclub Patron
- Chief Many Treaties - Indian Chief
- Thomas Martin - Penthouse Guest
- Harold Miller - Nightclub Patron, and Wedding Guest
- Bert Moorhouse - Jeweler / Wedding Guest
- Horace Murphy - Officer
- Forbes Murray - Elevator Rider
- Roger Neury - Waiter
- William H. O'Brien - Nightclub Waiter
- Sarah Padden - Woman in Elevator
- Emory Parnell - Mr. Buddoo
- Jack Perrin - Policeman
- Marshall Reed - Hood in Car
- Dewey Robinson - Frogface
- Matty Roubert - Elevator Boy in Theatre
- Harry Semels - Chef
- Dan Seymour - Fatso
- Larry Steers - Nightclub Patron / Wedding Guest
- Harry Strang - Diner
- Charles Sullivan - Nightclub Tough in Fight
- Phil Tead - Ninth National Bank Representative
- Walter Tetley - 2nd Elevator Operator
- Emmett Vogan - Man in Elevator
- Harry von Zell - Phil
- Max Wagner - Nightclub Tough in Fight
- Dave Willock - Stratosphere Balcony Usher
- Marek Windheim - Waiter

== Alternate version ==
There is an alternative version of the film where Allen's voice periodically breaks in on the action with wisecracks a la the opening credits. This version obscures some of the on-screen dialogue, including the punchline. This version has aired on AMC.

== Reception ==
At the time of its release in 1945, Bosley Crowther of The New York Times wrote that, aside from Mr. Allen's comments on the credits at the beginning of the film, which were superlative spoofing and recommended to everyone, it was a "dizzy, bewildering picture...this rat's nest of nonsense defied the sober description of a comparatively rational mind".

A favorable (3 stars out of 4) review by Leonard Maltin states "Story similar to The Twelve Chairs with flea-circus promoter Allen entitled to inheritance; plot soon goes out the window in favor of unrelated but amusing episodes, including hilarious encounter between Allen and Benny."
