= John Brown (actor) =

British actor (1904–1957)

- Publicity Photo of John Brown
- Born: April 4, 1904; Hull, Yorkshire, England
- Died: May 16, 1957 (aged 53); Hollywood, California, U.S.
- Occupation: Actor
- Years active: 1932–1957

John Brown (April 4, 1904 – May 16, 1957) was a British-American actor.

== Radio ==
Brown had major roles in several popular radio shows: He was "John Doe" in the Texaco Star Theater's version of Fred Allen's Allen's Alley, played Irma's love interest Al in My Friend Irma, both "Gillis" and Digby "Digger" O'Dell in The Life of Riley, (a role he reprised for the first incarnation of the television show), "Broadway" in The Damon Runyon Theatre, and "Thorny" the neighbor on the radio version of The Adventures of Ozzie and Harriet. Perhaps his most memorable piece of work is the ‘Broadway’ role; once heard, many reportedly find it impossible to think of the narrator of Damon Runyon’s stories as anyone else.

== Film ==
Brown appeared in some notable films: as the inebriated professor in Hitchcock’s Strangers on a Train (1951), The Day the Earth Stood Still (1951, uncredited), and The Wild One (1953); he supplied the voice of "Ro-Man" in the 1953 cult science fiction B-film Robot Monster.

== Television ==
In early television, Brown was the second actor (after Hal March) to play "Harry Morton", the next-door neighbor of George Burns and Gracie Allen in their situation comedy show, opposite Bea Benaderet; his tenure on the series lasted six months, and he was replaced by Fred Clark in June 1951.

== Personal life ==
In 1952, Brown was placed on the Hollywood blacklist.

== Death ==
Brown died of a heart attack on May 16, 1957, in West Hollywood, California, while en route to his doctor's office.

== Filmography ==
=== Radio ===
Original Air Date	Program	Role	Notes
1932	Police Headquarters		
1932–1936	Roses and Drums		
1935–1943	Town Hall Tonight/The Fred Allen Show/Texaco Star Theatre	John Doe Various characters	
1939	Arch Oboler's Plays		
1940–1945	Amanda of Honeymoon Hill	Mr. Lenord	
1942	Tillie the Toiler	Mr. Simpkins	
1943–1949	The Abbott and Costello Show	Travelling salesmen Police officers	
1943	Busy Mr. Bingle	Mr. Bingle	
1943–1945	The Jack Benny Program	Airplane Captain John Doe Various characters	
1944	This Is My Best "The Plot To Overthrow Christmas"	The Devil	
1944	The Burns and Allen Show		
1944–1945	It's Time to Smile		
1945	The Drene Show		
1944–1946	The Charlotte Greenwood Show	William Anderson	
1944–1950	A Date with Judy	Dad	
1944–1951	The Life of Riley	Digby "Digger" O'Dell; Gillis; Additional voices	
1945–1950	The Saint	Inspector Fernack	
1945–1952	The Adventures of Maisie	Mr. Dorsey	
1945–1954	The Adventures of Ozzie and Harriet	Thorny Thornberry	
1946–1951	A Day in the Life of Dennis Day	Mr. Willoughby	
1947–1954	My Friend Irma	Al	
1948–1949	The Damon Runyon Theatre	Broadway	
1949	Young Love	James Lewis' Dad	
1952–1953	December Bride	Various characters	

=== Films ===
Year	Title	Role	Notes
1944	Casanova Brown	Fire chief	Uncredited
1945	The Horn Blows at Midnight	Lew Poplinski – Waiter	Uncredited
1945	It's in the Bag!	Joe – Nightclub Doorman	Uncredited
1946	A Knight for a Day	Narrator	Voice, Uncredited
1946	Make Mine Music	Umpire	Voice
1946	The Stranger	Passport Photographer	Uncredited
1948	Make Mine Freedom	People	Voice, Uncredited
1949	The Life of Riley	Digby "Digger" O'Dell	
1949	Winter Storage	Chip 'n' Dale	Voice, Uncredited
1951	Three Desperate Men	Fairwether	
1951	The Lemon Drop Kid	Minor Role	Uncredited
1951	Symphony in Slang	St. Peter; The Hipster; Noah Webster	Voice
1951	Strangers on a Train	Professor Collins	
1951	The Day the Earth Stood Still	George Barley	Uncredited
1952	The Sniper	Wise	Uncredited
1952	Somebody Loves Me	Auto Salesman	Uncredited
1952	Something for the Birds	Mr. Lund	
1952	Hans Christian Andersen	Schoolmaster	
1953	That's My Pup	Spike	Voice, uncredited
1953	T.V. of Tomorrow	Las Vegas Special Narrator "We’re getting a picture now" Narrator	Voice, uncredited
1953	The Unicorn in the Garden	Husband; Psychiatrist	Voice
1953	Robot Monster	Ro-Man; Great Guidance	Voice
1953	Crazylegs	Keller	
1953	Man Crazy	Mr. Duncan	
1953	The Bigamist	Dr. Wallace	Uncredited
1953	The Wild One	Bill Hannegan	
1954	The Farm of Tomorrow	Tomato Narrator	Voice, uncredited
1954	Dixieland Droopy	Narrator; Agent	Voice, Uncredited, (final film role)

=== Television ===
Year	Program	Role	Notes
1949–1950	The Life of Riley	Digby "Digger" O'Dell	Was the only original cast member to join the television version
1951	I Love Lucy	Mr. Murdoch	"The Mustache"
1951	The Amos 'n Andy Show	The Loan Shark	"Leroy Lends a Hand"; Uncredited
1951	The George Burns and Gracie Allen Show	Harry Morton	
1952	Biff Baker, U.S.A.	Mueller	"Counterfeit Plates"
