= Jimmy Wallington =

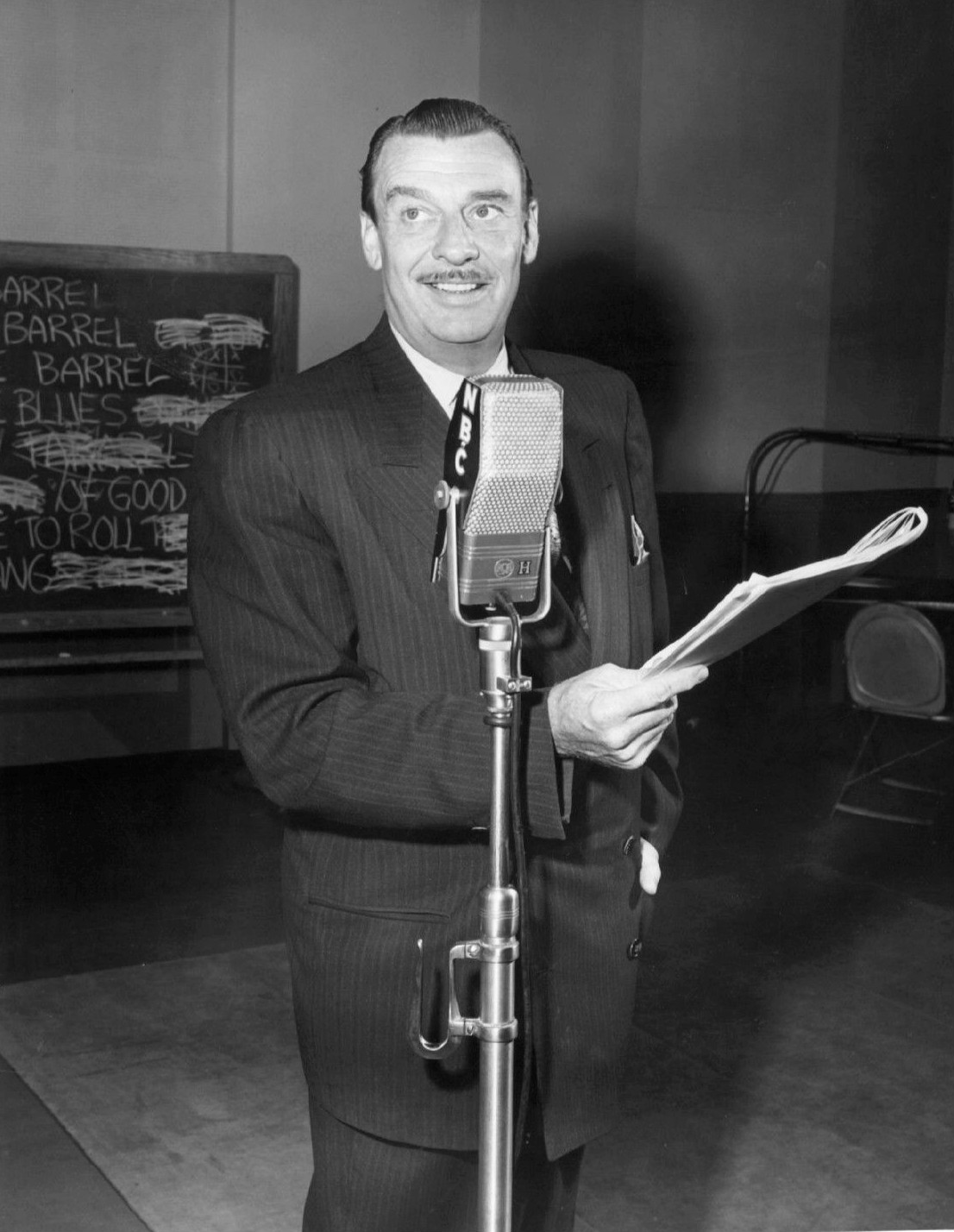
- Wallington on the radio show Ask Hollywood.
- Presenting career
- Show: The Big Show, The Fred Allen Show/Texaco Star Theater, The Life of Riley
- Stations: NBC, CBS
- Style: Announcer
- Country: United States

Jimmy Wallington (September 15, 1907 – December 22, 1972) was an American radio personality.

After playing small roles in a few Hollywood films, he was the announcer for several popular radio shows in the 1940s and 1950s.

For his work on radio, Wallington has a star on the Hollywood Walk of Fame at 6660 Hollywood Blvd.

== Biography ==
Wallington was the announcer for several popular radio shows in the 1930s, 1940s and 1950s, including Texaco Star Theatre with Fred Allen (1941–44) and Texaco Town with Eddie Cantor. As with most announcers, Wallington would announce the program's star, then read the sponsor's commercials. In addition, he was often given comedy lines. When radio shows moved to television, he continued as a television announcer in the 1950s. (see the Filmography section)

After years as a radio announcer, he became a TV star in California doing Life Insurance and other commercials. He ended his professional radio career as a Voice of America radio announcer in the Worldwide English service.

== Filmography ==
=== Movies ===
- Joe Palooka in Triple Cross (1951) .... Himself
- Hollywood Stadium Mystery (1938) .... Nick Nichols
- Start Cheering (1938) .... Announcer

=== Radio ===
- During August 1934 toured, with the Three X Sisters, Mary Small, and other entertainers, as NBC radio personality at the famous Steel Pier music hot spot.
- The Alan Young Show ... himself - announcer
- The Big Show (1950–1951) .... Himself - Announcer
- The Life of Riley (1949–1951) .... Himself - Announcer
- Screen Director's Playhouse (1949–1951) .... Himself - Announcer
- Stranger Than Fiction (1934–1939) .... Himself - Announcer
- The Fred Allen Show (1940s) .... Himself - Announcer
- The Martin and Lewis Show (1949–51) . . . Himself - Announcer

Announcer NBC radio mid-1930s https://www.myspace.com/my/photos/photo/22962106/ Jimmy Wallington radio NBC

=== Television ===
- Panic (1958) .... Radio Announcer (1 episode)
- Toast of the Town (1955) .... Himself (1 episode)
- This Is Your Life (1954) .... Himself (1 episode)
- The Colgate Comedy Hour (1951–1953) .... Himself - Announcer
