= Parker Fennelly =

American actor (1891–1988)

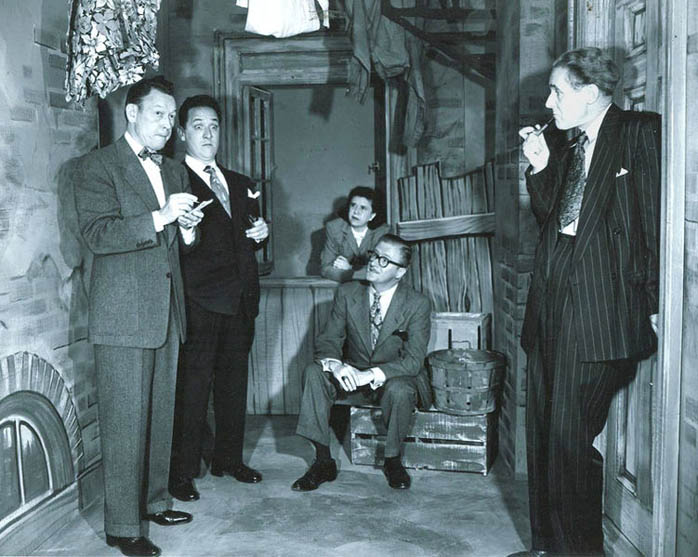
- The "Allen's Alley" cast (l to r): Fred Allen, Kenny Delmar, Minerva Pious, Peter Donald and Parker Fennelly.
- Born: October 22, 1891; Northeast Harbor, Maine, U.S.
- Died: January 22, 1988 (aged 96); Peekskill, New York, U.S.
- Occupation: Actor
- Years active: 1924–1977

Parker W. Fennelly (October 22, 1891 – January 22, 1988) was an American character actor who appeared in ten films, numerous television episodes and hundreds of radio programs.

== Early life ==
The son of gardener Nathan Fennelly and Estelle Dolliver Fennelly, he was born and raised in Northeast Harbor, Maine, and studied classical acting in Boston, where he was a member of the Toy Theater company and participated in Chautauqua readings. He studied under the performing arts educator Leland T. Powers.

== Stage ==
In 1915 and 1916, Fennelly toured on the Midland Chautauqua Circuit with the Maud Scheerer Shakespeare Players. In 1919, he traveled and acted with the Jack X. Lewis Stock Company. Fennelly and his wife, Catherine Reynolds Fennelly, formed the Parker Fennelly Duo, presenting short plays, readings and impersonations (1921–1923).

Fennelly's performances on Broadway included roles in Mr. Pitt (1924), The Small Timers (1925), Florida Girl (1925), Babbling Brookes (1927), Black Velvet (1927), The County Chairman (1936), Yours, A. Lincoln (1942), Our Town (1944), Happily Ever After (1945), Live Life Again (1945), Loco (1946) and The Southwest Corner (1955). His other Broadway credits include directing Technique (1931), providing source material for Fulton of Oak Falls (1937) and writing Cuckoos on the Hearth (1941).

== Radio ==
Fennelly and Arthur Allen played "Yankee codgers" on The Stebbins Boys of Bucksport Point and Snow Village Sketches in the early years of radio.

=== Allen's Alley ===
Fennelly personified the crusty New England Yankee in roles on radio, films and television. He was heard weekly as Titus Moody on the "Allen's Alley" segment of Fred Allen's radio show where he delivered his famous opening line, "Howdy, Bub".

=== Other radio ===
Fennelly's other roles on radio included the following:

Program	Character
Lawyer Tucker	Tucker
Ma and Pa	Pa
Mother and Dad	Dad
Mr. Feathers	Mr. Feathers
Prairie Folks	Smiley
The Adventures of the Thin Man	Eb
Valiant Lady	Mike Hagen

In 1960, Fennelly recorded Moody Speaking, a series of "sparkling one-minute and five-minute vignettes" produced by Banner Radio Company for local stations.

== Television and films ==
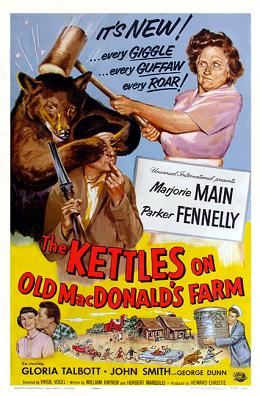
Note how this poster illustration was cleverly designed to disguise the face of Parker Fennelly, who stepped in to replace series regular Percy Kilbride.

Fennelly made numerous appearances on live television shows in the early 1950s, including Lux Video Theatre, The Philco Television Playhouse and Studio One. In 1956, he guest-starred on an episode of Father Knows Best as a housepainter. He also appeared in "The Trouble with Richard," an unsold television pilot starring Dick Van Dyke aired on the anthology series New Comedy Showcase in 1960. In 1970–1971, he played Mr. Purdy on Headmaster on CBS.

In film, Fennelly portrayed the millionaire in Alfred Hitchcock's The Trouble with Harry (1955) and he replaced Percy Kilbride as Pa Kettle in the final film of the "Ma and Pa Kettle" series, The Kettles on Old MacDonald's Farm. After Angel in My Pocket (1969), his last movie role was Universal's How to Frame a Figg (1971) starring Don Knotts.

In later years, Fennelly became a familiar face as the Pepperidge Farm's television spokesman between 1956 and 1977, delivering the slogan "Pepperidge Farm remembers" in his New England accent, then turned over the role to Charles C. Welch.

== Personal life ==
In 1918, Fennelly met and married Catherine Deane "while both of them were playing in a stock company in Moline, Illinois". They had two daughters, Mary and Jane, and a son, John.

== Recordings ==
In 1950, Fennelly made the children's record "Ride 'Em Cowboy (I and II)" (CGR-1003). In 1953, he recorded another children's item, "Hunters of the Sea" (Record Guild 9006).

== Death ==
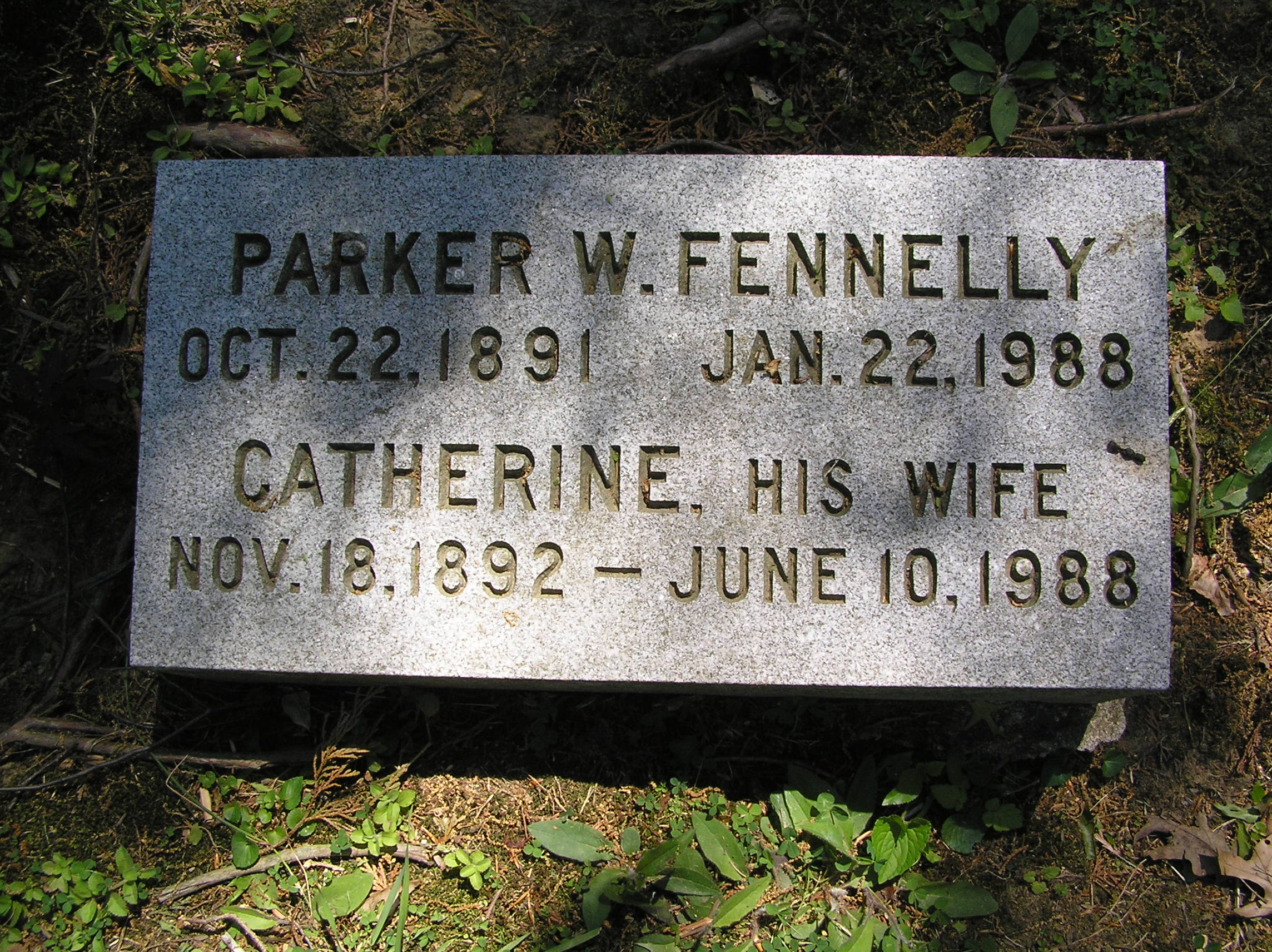
The grave site of Parker W. Fennelly and his wife

Fennelly died on January 22, 1988, aged 96, at his home in Peekskill, New York. He was survived by his wife, two daughters, four grandsons and one great-grandson.

His widow, Catherine Fennelly (1892–1988), died five months later, aged 95. Their remains were interred in Sleepy Hollow Cemetery in Sleepy Hollow, New York.

== Filmography ==
Year	Title	Role	Notes
1949	Lost Boundaries	Alvin Tupper	
1951	The Whistle at Eaton Falls	Issac	
1955	The Trouble with Harry	Millionaire	
1957	The Kettles on Old MacDonald's Farm	Pa Kettle	
1959	It Happened to Jane	Homer Bean	
1966	The Russians Are Coming, the Russians Are Coming	Mr. Everett	
1968	Pretty Poison	Sam - Night Watchman	uncredited
1969	Angel in My Pocket	Calvin Grey	
1971	How to Frame a Figg	Old Charley Spaulding	
