= Texaco Star Theater =

American broadcast comedy-variety show

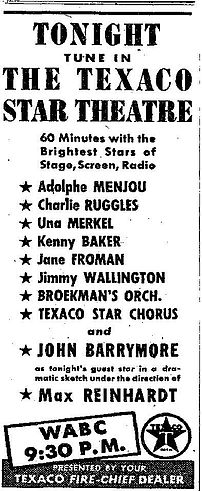
An October 12, 1938, advertisement for Texaco Star Theatre

Texaco Star Theater is an American comedy-variety show, broadcast on radio from 1938 to 1949 and telecast from 1948 to 1956. It was one of the first successful examples of American television broadcasting, remembered as the show that gave Milton Berle the nickname "Mr. Television", and helping propel the sales of Televisions in the 1950s.

The classic 1940–1944 version of the program, hosted by radio's Fred Allen, was followed by a radio series on ABC (the former NBC Blue) in the spring of 1948. When Texaco (now Chevron Corporation) first took it to television on NBC on June 8, 1948, the show had a huge cultural impact. Once Texaco ended its sponsorship in 1953, the show became known as The Buick-Berle Show under new sponsor Buick, changing to The Milton Berle Show for its final season.

== Radio ==
=== The Fire Chief ===
The roots of Texaco Star Theater were in a 1930s radio hit, Ed Wynn, The Fire Chief, featuring the manic "Perfect Fool" in a half-hour of vaudevillian routines interspersed with music. Wynn's ratings began to slide and the comedian lapsed amidst personal and professional crises, and the show ended in June 1935. Texaco sponsored The Jumbo Fire Chief Program in 1935–36 and The Fire Chief Concert in 1936.

=== Texaco Town ===
Comedian Eddie Cantor was the star of a show called "Texaco Town" from 1936 to 1938. The show's cast featured young singers Bobby Breen and Deanna Durbin, announcer Jimmy Wallington, who read the commercials for Fire Chief gasoline, Parkyakarkus, and bandleader Jacques Renard. The show was a combination of comedy and music. Cantor frequently sang a tune about the "mayor of Texaco Town".

=== Texaco Star Theatre ===
Texaco Star Theater (spelled Theatre for most of the radio show's run) was first broadcast on October 5, 1938, and it continued on the air until June 26, 1940. Initial host Adolphe Menjou was succeeded by John Barrymore, who was replaced by Ken Murray. During the almost two-year span, Una Merkel, Irene Noblette, Charlie Ruggles, and Ned Sparks appeared as comedians. Kenny Baker, Jane Froman, and Frances Langford sang, with David Broekman leading the orchestra. Jimmy Wallington was the announcer. The show began as a variety show with dramatizations and songs by guest stars.

=== Texaco Star Theater with Fred Allen ===
In 1940, the show became a star vehicle for Allen, with the show re-titled Texaco Star Theater with Fred Allen and the program airing on October 2, 1940.

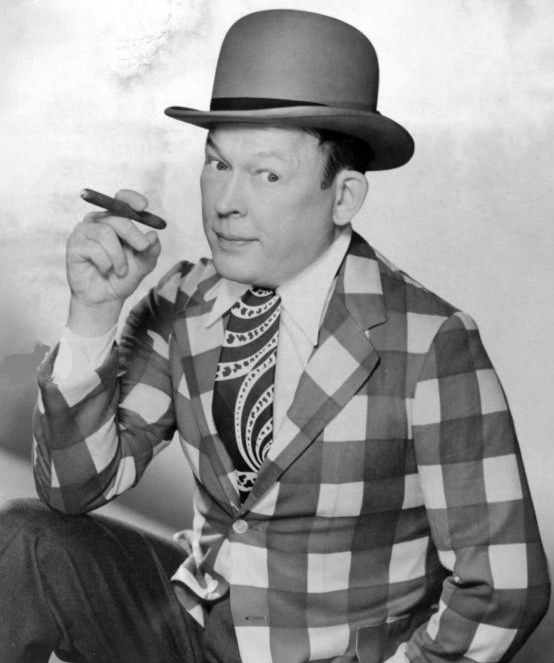
Photo of Fred Allen for the show's premiere, 1940.

Allen's previous sponsor, Bristol-Myers' Ipana toothpaste and Sal Hepatica laxative, decided to cease their tandem sponsorship of Allen's successful hour, first known as Town Hall Tonight and then, for its final season, The Fred Allen Show. He presided over Texaco Star Theater from 1940 to 1942 as an hour-long show on Wednesday and then Sunday nights, and from 1942 to 1944 as a half-hour show, until he withdrew from work for over a year on his doctor's advice. It was during the half-hour version of the show that the more cerebral (if barbed) Allen premiered the continuing comic sketch for which many remember him best: the ensemble, topical takeoffs of "Allen's Alley". Guests included some of the best comedic actors of the time, including Sam Levene, the legendary Broadway actor and Hollywood film character actor.

Though some believe the title Texaco Star Theater was retired temporarily, in favor of Texaco Time, after Allen scaled the show back to a half-hour, the show retained the Texaco Star Theater title officially, the confusion likely stemming from the announcers' first words of introduction: "It's Texaco time starring Fred Allen." They customarily continued the introduction, as the opening music continued, by referring to Texaco Star Theater. Jimmy Wallington became the show's announcer for most of its life with Allen as the feature (he succeeded George Burns and Gracie Allen sidekick Harry Von Zell), though for a brief spell during its third season the announcer was budding radio personality and future television legend Arthur Godfrey. Kenny Baker also remained for the first two seasons, his previous role with Allen's "rival" Jack Benny serving for a number of situations, although his role was greatly reduced by 1942, partly because Baker had become difficult to manage, particularly after a controversial performance of "Ave Maria" sung in German weeks after the United States officially entered World War II.

Allen was forced to leave the show in 1944 due to hypertension; he returned with a different sponsor on NBC, while staying with and further refining his half-hour format a year later.

=== After Fred Allen ===
Texaco Star Theater's next hosts included James Melton (1944–1947) with co-host Annamary Dickey (1945–1947), Tony Martin (1947–1948), Gordon MacRae (1948), Jack Carter (1948), and Milton Berle (1948–1949).

== Television ==
On television, continuing a practice long established in radio, Texaco included its brand name in the show title. When the television version launched on June 8, 1948, Texaco also made sure its employees were featured prominently throughout the hour, usually appearing as smiling "guardian angels" performing good deeds of one or another kind, and a quartet of Texaco singers opened each week's show with the theme song.

They did not settle on Berle—who hosted a freshly revived radio version in spring 1948—as the permanent host right away; he hosted the first television Texaco Star Theater in June 1948 but was originally part of a rotation of hosts (Berle himself had only a four-week contract). Comedian Jack Carter was host for August. Berle was named the permanent host that fall.

He was a smash once the new full season began, Texaco Star Theater hitting ratings as high as 80 and owning Tuesday night for NBC from 8 to 9 p.m. ET. And, as the show landed a pair of Emmy Awards in that first year (the show itself, for Best Kinescope Show; and, Berle as Most Outstanding Kinescoped Personality), Uncle Miltie (he first called himself by that name ad-libbing at the end of a 1949 broadcast) joked, preened, pratfell, danced, costumed, and clowned his way to stardom, with Americans discovering television as a technological marvel and entertainment medium seeming to bring the country to a dead stop every Tuesday night, just to see what the madcap Berle might pull next.

With Berle at the helm, Texaco Star Theater was largely credited with driving American television set sales heavily; the number of TV sets sold during Berle's run on the show was said to have grown from 500,000, his first year on the tube, to over 30 million when the show ended in 1956. Texaco Star Theater was also the highest rated television show of the 1950–1951 television season, the first season in which the Nielsen ratings were used.

Uncle Miltie was far from alone in keeping the show alive and kicking. His support players included Fatso Marco (1948–1952), Ruth Gilbert as "Maxine", Milton's love-starved secretary (1952–1955), Bobby Sherwood (1952–1953), Arnold Stang (1953–1955), Jack Collins (1953–1955), and Milton Frome (1953–1955). The show's music was provided by Alan Roth (1948–1955) and Victor Young (1955–1956), with vocal work provided by the Kentucky Mountaineers, a country act that included (among others) singer Jean Valli.

As phenomenally popular as Texaco Star Theater was, it was hardly an undisturbed appeal. "Berle presented himself as one part buffoon and one part consummate, professional entertainer—a kind of veteran of the Borscht Belt trenches," the Museum of Broadcast Communications would observe decades after the show left the air. "Yet even within his shows' sanctioned exhibitionism, some of Berle's behavior could cross the line from affability to effrontery. At its worst, the underlying tone of the Berle programs can appear to be one of contempt should the audience not respond approvingly. In some cases, this led to a surprising degree of self-consciousness about TV itself—Texaco's original commercial spokesman, Sid Stone, would sometimes hawk his products until driven from the stage by a cop. But the uneven balance of excess and decorum proved wildly successful."

Based on episodes that appear on the Internet Archive, it appears the series typically ran 48–50 minutes excluding commercials.

== Buick sponsorship ==
Texaco dropped its sponsorship of the show and Buick became the new sponsor in 1953, prompting the show's name change to The Buick-Berle Show. Two years later, it became, simply, The Milton Berle Show, its title until its run ended at last in June 1956. By then, Berle and his audience had probably burned out on each other, and Buick had even dropped sponsorship of the show at the beginning of the 1955–1956 season (opting to sponsor Jackie Gleason's half-hour filmed edition of The Honeymooners), after ratings fell dramatically during the 1954–1955 as well (the higher ratings of his 1955–56 competition, The Phil Silvers Show on CBS, did not help Berle either); though Berle would remain one of the nation's beloved entertainers, overall, the show that made him a superstar was clearly spent for steam and fresh ideas, and two subsequent attempts at television comebacks hosting his own show lasted barely a year each. (Berle did, however, contribute his part to the making of a rock and roll legend: in his final season, he opened his stage to Elvis Presley amid the beginning of the hip-swiveling singer's international popularity.)

Part of the problem was variety shows becoming costlier to produce, compared to the Texaco days when, among other factors, name guest stars did not mind the low appearance fees they got for appearing, because they could bank the exposure they got from even one appearance on the Berle show; or with Fred Allen and Ed Wynn in its earlier radio incarnations.

But part of the problem was Berle himself: with competition (Jack Benny, George Burns, Bob Hope, Perry Como, etc.) crowding him more and more as the years went on, as more television performers and creators found their on-camera legs, and brought new or at least more polished ideas to the air, Berle tried refining his camera persona and evolving from the freewheeling, manic style he cultivated so successfully in the Texaco years. The net result: the balance between excess and decorum now weighted more toward decorum, which wasn't exactly what Berle represented at the height of his popularity. He began losing many of his former fans, who preferred when he kept things more unpredictable, and it would be years before his kind of manic balance would find a television home again.

== Broadcast history ==
NOTE: The most frequent time slot for the series is in bold text.

- **Tuesday at 8:00–9:00 pm on NBC: June 1948 – June 1956**
- Wednesday at 9:00–9:30 pm on NBC: October 1958 – May 1959

== U.S. television ratings ==
Note: Each U.S. network television season starts in late September and ends in late May, which coincides with the completion of May sweeps.

Season	Ranking	Ratings
1950–1951	No. 1	61.6
1951–1952	No. 2	53.8
1952–1953	No. 5	46.7
1953–1954	No. 5	40.2
1954–1955	No. 11	34.6
1955–1956	N/A	

In the 1954–1955 season, the half-hour Texaco Star Theater offered in alternation The Jimmy Durante Show and The Donald O'Connor Show on the NBC Saturday evening schedule.

As a Top 30 program, Texaco Star Theater has an average rating of 47.3.
