= Sal Hepatica =

Mineral salt laxative

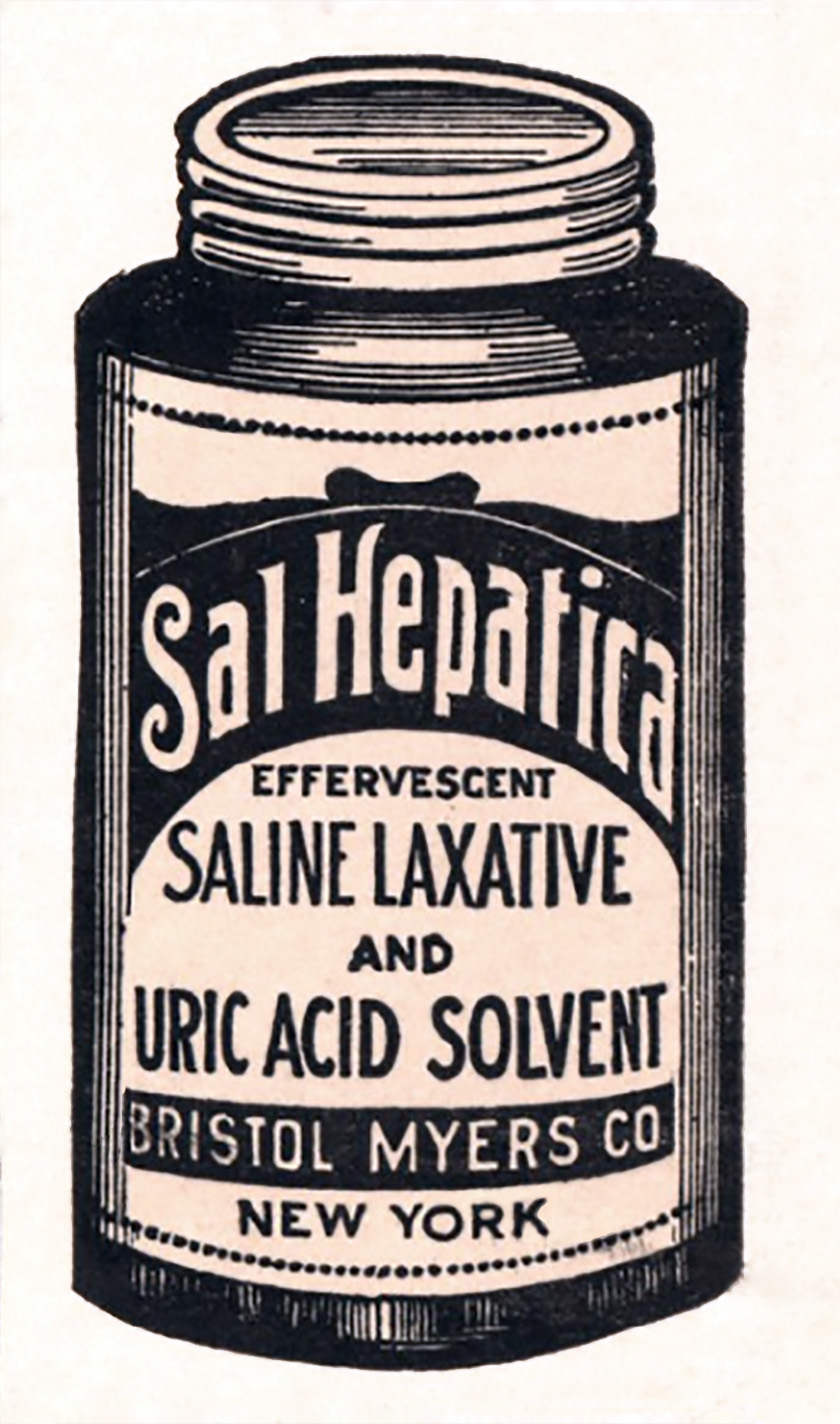
Sal Hepatica (1909)

Sal Hepatica is a mineral salt laxative that was produced and marketed by Bristol-Myers from its inception in 1887, becoming its first nationally recognized product in 1903, until 1958. When dissolved in water, it was said to reproduce the taste and effect of the natural mineral waters of Bohemia.

== Composition and mechanism of action ==
The product was composed of Glauber's salt (sodium sulfate), baking soda (sodium bicarbonate), tartaric acid, common salt (sodium chloride), sodium phosphate and traces of lithium carbonate and water. It was marketed as a saline laxative and alkalinizing agent. In the latter role it was recommended for dissolving uric acid in gout and "rheumatism", and for various other stomach, liver, and kidney disorders.

== See also ==
- Epsom Salt A Magnesium sulfate salt marketed as the active ingredient in the water from Epsom
