= It's a Joke, Son! =

1947 film by Benjamin Stoloff

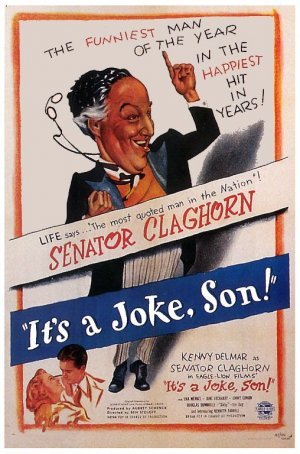
- Original film poster
- Directed by: Benjamin Stoloff
- Written by: Robert E. Kent; Paul Gerard Smith
- Produced by: Aubrey Schenck
- Starring: Kenny Delmar; Una Merkel; June Lockhart; Jimmy Conlin; Douglas Dumbrille 'Daisy' the Dog and introducing Kenneth Farrell
- Cinematography: Clyde De Vinna
- Edited by: Norman Colbert
- Music by: Alvin Levin
- Production company: Bryan Foy Productions
- Distributed by: Eagle-Lion Films
- Release date: January 15, 1947
- Running time: 63 minutes
- Country: United States
- Language: English
- Budget: $650,000

It's a Joke, Son! is a 1947 American comedy film directed by Benjamin Stoloff (in his final directorial role in a film) featuring radio comedian Kenny Delmar as Senator Beauregard Claghorn, a character on Fred Allen's radio program and later the inspiration for the cartoon character Foghorn Leghorn. The film was the first American production for Eagle-Lion Films, and although it was produced on a very small budget compared to other Hollywood films, it was a box-office disappointment; one theater chain removed the film after less than a week after it only drew $1,000 in ticket sales.

The film contributed to a multimillion-dollar loss for Eagle-Lion in 1947, and Arthur B. Krim later stated that the studio had overpaid for Delmar and overestimated his bankability. It is in the public domain.

== Plot ==
When the Daughters of Dixie nominate Magnolia Claghorn as a candidate for state senator, the local political machine run by northerners fears that its candidate will be defeated. Through the Claghorns' daughter's boyfriend Jeff, the members of the machine concoct a plan to run Magnolia's husband Beauregard to split the antimachine vote. However, when Beauregard attracts great popularity, they must seek to stop him.

== Cast ==
It's a Joke, Son!

- Kenny Delmar as Senator Beauregard Claghorn
- Una Merkel as Mrs. Magnolia Claghorn
- June Lockhart as Mary Lou Claghorn
- Kenneth Farrell as Jefferson "Jeff" Davis
- Douglass Dumbrille as Big Dan Healey
- Jimmy Conlin as Senator Alexander P. Leeds
- Matt Willis as Ace, Healey's Henchman
- Ralph Sanford as Knifey, Healey's Henchman
- Daisy as Daisy
- Vera Lewis as Hortense Dimwitty
- Margaret McWade as Jennifer Whipple
- Ida Moore as Matilda Whipple

== Soundtrack ==
- Dixie
- The Bonnie Blue Flag
