= The Woods Are Full of Cuckoos =

1937 film by Frank Tashlin

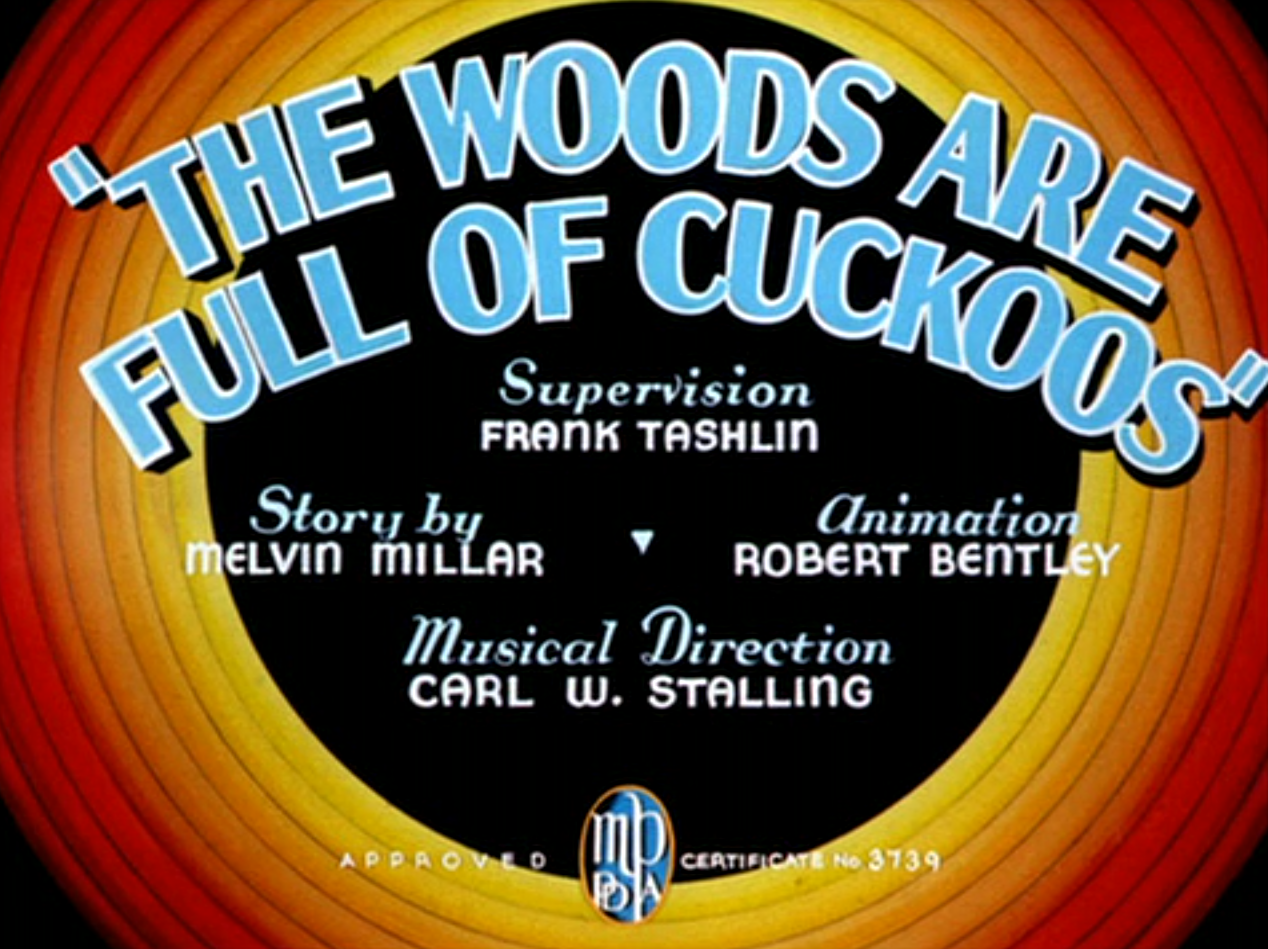
- Title card
- Directed by: Frank Tashlin
- Story by: Melvin Millar
- Produced by: Leon Schlesinger
- Starring: Mel Blanc; Danny Webb; Cliff Nazarro; Tedd Pierce; Eloise Spann
- Music by: Carl W. Stalling
- Animation by: Robert Bentley
- Color process: Technicolor
- Production company: Leon Schlesinger Productions
- Distributed by: Warner Bros. Productions; The Vitaphone Corporation
- Release date: December 4, 1937
- Running time: 7 min
- Country: United States
- Language: English

The Woods Are Full of Cuckoos is a 1937 American animated comedy short film directed by Frank Tashlin. The short was released on December 4, 1937. It is the 86th film in the Merrie Melodies series.

== Plot ==
An owl caricature of Alexander Woollcott presents a radio show alongside caricatures of Ben Bernie and Walter Winchell, who return from The CooCoo Nut Grove.

A squirrel caricature of Milton Berle introduces a caricature of Wendell Hall, who guides the live audience to sing, but he confuses them with the required songbook page to the point he is pelted with them. Caricatures of Billy Jones and Ernie Hare lead the crowd to sing the titular song. A white rabbit caricature of Portland Hoffa informs a fox caricature of Fred Allen that he is singing the wrong song. Caricatures of Eddie Cantor, Sophie Tucker, W. C. Fields, Dick Powell, Fats Waller, Deanna Durbin, Irvin S. Cobb, Fred MacMurray, Bing Crosby, Al Jolson, Ruby Keeler and Lanny Ross join in with their own ways. Caricatures of Grace Moore and Lily Pons sing notes higher than each other while their neck stretches, eventually harmonizing and bow their heads in exhaustion.

More caricatures, including Haven McQuarrie, Joe Penner and Martha Raye sing. Tizzy Fish makes a waffle on air. A possum caricature of Louella Parsons presents caricatures of Jack Benny, Mary Livingstone and Andy Devine before Woollcott bids the audience goodnight.

== Home media ==
The short was released on disc 2 of the Looney Tunes Golden Collection: Volume 3 DVD set.
