= The Big Show (TV series) =

American TV variety series (1980)

- Genre: Variety show
- Written by: David Axlerod; Stan Burns
- Directed by: Steve Binder; Tony Charmoli
- Presented by: Dick Clark
- Country of origin: United States
- Original language: English
- No. of seasons: 1
- No. of episodes: 11

Production
- Running time: 90 minutes
- Production company: Dick Clark Productions

Original release
- Network: NBC
- Release: 4 March – 3 June 1980

Related
- The Big Show (radio)

The Big Show is an American comedy-variety-musical television series produced and broadcast by NBC from March 4, 1980, through June 3, 1980.

The series aimed to revitalize the moribund variety television genre, which had been in a downward spiral for several years. The Big Show took its title seriously, using a huge stage set (complete with a live audience and an ice rink and swimming pool) and filling a 90-minute time-slot (one of the only variety programs in American television history to run this length), with at least one two-hour installment broadcast. It was in many respects a revival and television adaptation of The Big Show, which had aired on the NBC Radio Network from 1950 to 1951 and likewise was a big-budget, 90-minute weekly variety show designed to prevent old-time radio from fading into history.

Although the first broadcast ranked 16th in national ratings, poor reviews and low ratings of succeeding episodes (typical of NBC during the Fred Silverman era) resulted in the program being cancelled after only a few months on May 8, 1980. The series nonetheless was nominated for six Emmy Awards, winning for Outstanding Costume Design.

Regular performers included Joe Baker, Mimi Kennedy, Shabba-Doo, Charlie Hill, Graham Chapman, Owen Sullivan, Edie McClurg, Paul Grimm, and Pamela Myers. Groups that appeared regularly included The Big Show Water Ballet, The Big Show Ice Skaters, The Tony Charmoli Dancers, and The Nick Perito Orchestra.

Guest hosts included Steve Allen, Sarah Purcell, Flip Wilson, Dean Martin, Tony Randall, Don Rickles, Victor Borge, Geoffrey Holder, and Gary Coleman. Skaters who performed in the show included Peggy Fleming, Dorothy Hamill, John Curry, Jim Bray, and Toller Cranston. Others appearances included Nell Carter, magician David Copperfield, and comics Gallagher and Sid Caesar.

== Production ==
The Big Show was broadcast on Tuesdays from 9 to 10:30 p.m. Eastern Time. Nick Vanoff was the producer, and Steve Binder was the director.

== Critical response ==
John J. O'Connor wrote in a review of the premiere episode in The New York Times that the program's format was intriguing because "the variety format has evidently fallen out of favor with television audiences". He described the attempted revival via this program as "not only startling but gutsy." Nevertheless, O'Connor wrote that the premiere was "delightful" and added, "The overall conception is astonishing, the pacing is bright, much of the comedy is funny, and the special acts are -- well, special."
