= Kenny Delmar =

American actor (1910–1984)

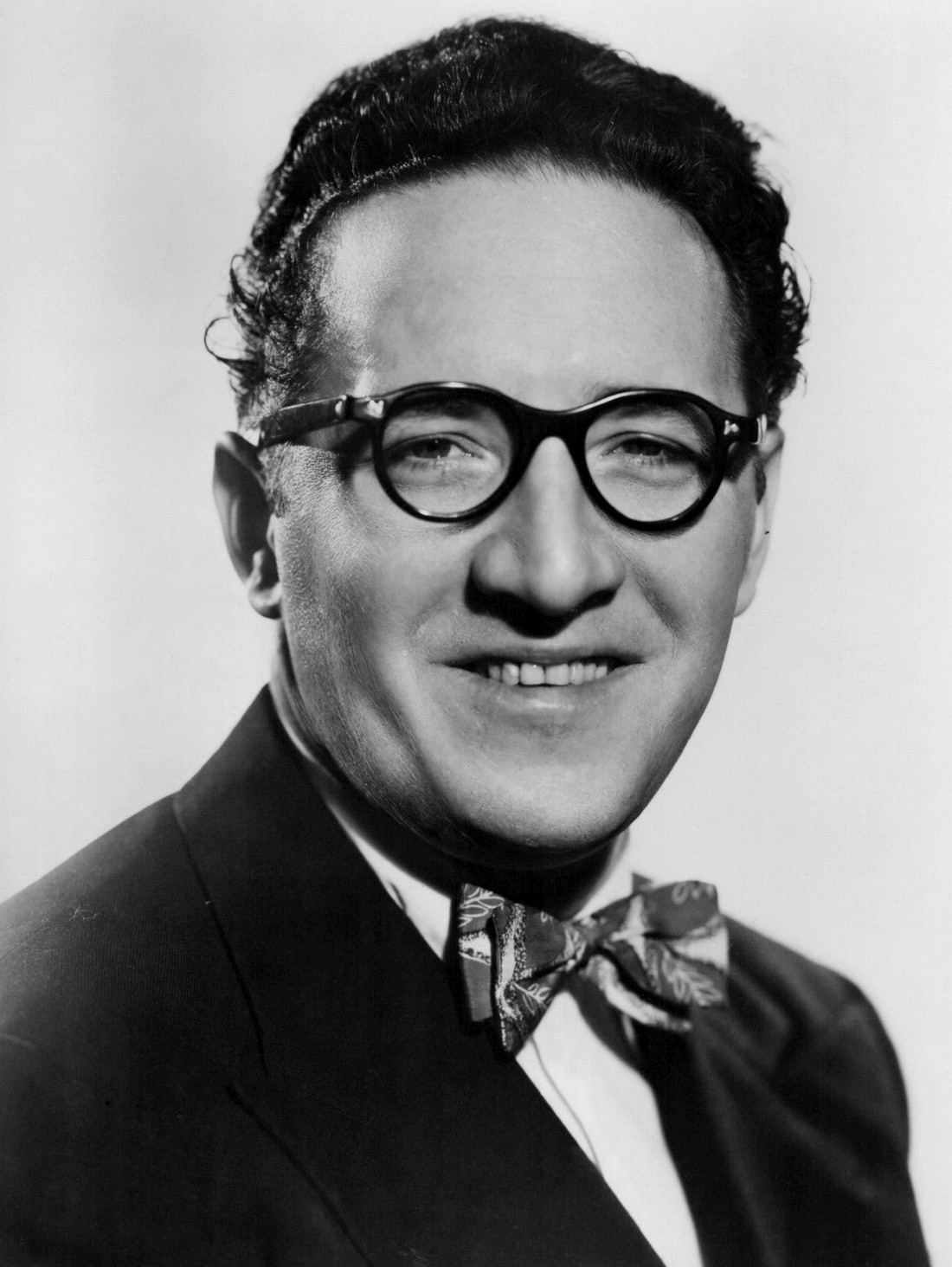
- Delmar in 1955
- Born: Kenneth Frederick Fay Howard; September 5, 1910; Boston, Massachusetts
- Died: July 14, 1984 (aged 73); Stamford, Connecticut
- Occupation: Actor
- Known for: Senator Beauregard Claghorn
- Spouse: Alice Cochran Howard

Kenneth Howard Delmar (born Kenneth Frederick Fay Howard; September 5, 1910 – July 14, 1984) was an American actor active in radio, films, and animation. An announcer on the pioneering radio news series The March of Time, he became a national radio sensation in 1945 as Senator Beauregard Claghorn on the running "Allen's Alley" sketch on The Fred Allen Show. The character Delmar created was a primary inspiration for the Warner Bros. cartoon character Foghorn Leghorn.

== Early life and career ==
Delmar was born September 5, 1910, in Boston, but moved to New York City in infancy after the separation of his parents. His mother, Evelyn Delmar, was a vaudevillian who toured the country with her sister. Kenny Delmar was on the stage from age seven. His first screen appearance was in the D. W. Griffith film Orphans of the Storm (1921), in which he played the Joseph Schildkraut role as a child. During the Depression he left the stage to work in his stepfather's business. After running his own dancing school for a year he married one of his ballet teachers, Alice Cochran, and decided to try a career in radio.

== Radio ==
By the late 1930s, Delmar was an announcer on such major radio series as The March of Time and Your Hit Parade. He played multiple roles in The Mercury Theatre on the Air's October 1938 radio drama The War of the Worlds. His main role was that of Captain Lansing of the Signal Corps who dies when 7,000 troops confront the Martian invaders, and also is noted for his address to the "citizens of the nation" as the Secretary of the Interior, in which role he spoke in a stentorian, declamatory style deliberately reminiscent of then-President Franklin Roosevelt. Cavalcade of America featured him in their repertory cast, and also was heard as Commissioner Weston on early episodes of The Shadow.

Delmar is notable for creating the character Senator Beauregard Claghorn on Fred Allen's radio program Allen's Alley, which he did while also serving as the show's regular announcer. Senator Claghorn made his radio debut October 7, 1945, and six months later was called "unquestionably the most quoted man in the nation" by Life magazine. The role inspired the Warner Bros. animated character Foghorn Leghorn, first seen in the Oscar-nominated cartoon Walky Talky Hawky (1946).

"During the late 1940s, Mr. Delmar captivated 20 million radio listeners every Sunday night with his burlesque of a bombastic, super-chauvinistic legislator who drank only from Dixie cups and refused to drive through the Lincoln Tunnel," wrote The New York Times. "His stock expression, 'That's a joke, son,' was for many years one of the nation's pet phrases, mimicked by children and businessmen alike. ... The windbag character, he said, was inspired by a Texas cattle rancher who had picked him up while he was hitchhiking and barely stopped talking."

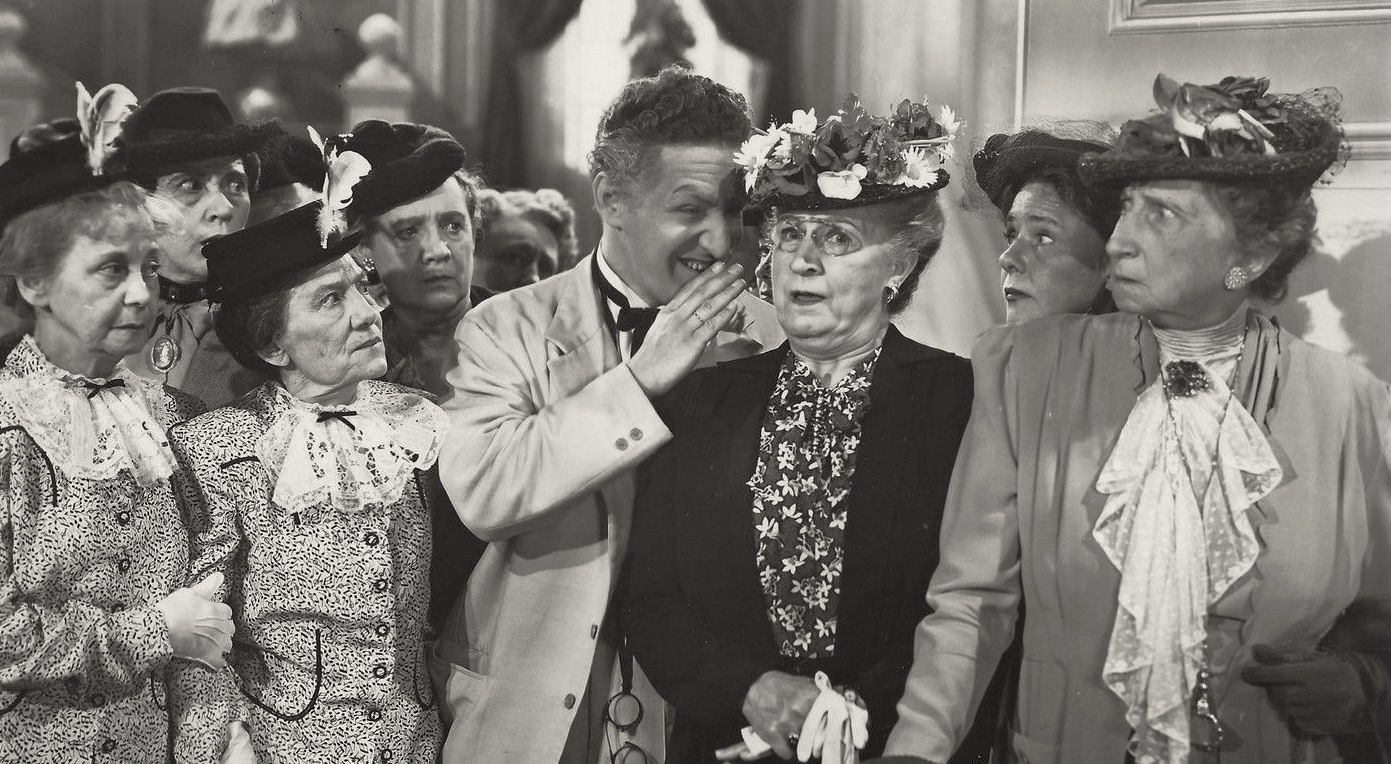
Kenny Delmar (only man in the picture) in It's a Joke, Son! (1947)

At the height of his popularity, Delmar also starred as Claghorn in a theatrical feature film, It's a Joke, Son! in 1947.

Delmar was also announcer and voice performer on The Alan Young Show in 1944. One of the characters that he played was Counselor Cartonbranch who is obviously similar in mannerisms and voice to Senator Claghorn. In 1953 he returned to radio replacing Hans Conried's character on My Friend Irma, as the Professor's cousin, Maestro Wanderkin and as Conried's Schultz on Life with Luigi.

== Television ==
Delmar was the host of the live-action School House program on WABD-TV in 1949.

Delmar was heard by a later generation of television watchers via the animated characters The Hunter, Commander McBragg, Major Minor on "Klondike Kat", and other Saturday morning cartoon icons.

Delmar voiced The Hunter using his Senator Claghorn inflections, including "That's a joke, son." "The Hunter" was a dog detective whose nemesis was The Fox, a criminal fox who attempted bizarre capers, usually huge in scope (such as attempting to steal the Brooklyn Bridge, the Statue of Liberty or, in one episode, the State of Florida). The Hunter ran as an ancillary segment of the cartoon series King Leonardo and His Short Subjects, produced by Total Television Productions.

== Death ==
Delmar died on July 14, 1984, at St. Joseph's Hospital in Stamford, Connecticut, aged 73.
