= The Big Show (NBC Radio) =

American network radio program (1950–1952)

When The Big Show premiered November 5, 1950, this ad, showing NBC's full evening schedule, ran in Sunday newspapers across the country. Here's how it looked in the Kingsport Times-News (Kingsport, Tennessee). Clockwise from top left: Mindy Carson, Jimmy Durante, Tallulah Bankhead, Fred Allen and Ethel Merman

The Big Show was an American NBC radio network variety program featuring 90 minutes of comic, stage, screen, and music talent. It was aimed at keeping American radio in its classic era and making it robust against the rapidly growing television tide. The show ran from November 5, 1950, to April 20, 1952.

== Personalities ==
Hosted by stage actress Tallulah Bankhead, The Big Show began November 5, 1950, on NBC with a stellar line-up of guests: Fred Allen, Mindy Carson, Jimmy Durante, José Ferrer, Portland Hoffa, Frankie Laine, Russell Knight, Paul Lukas, Ethel Merman, Danny Thomas, and Meredith Willson. To make sure no one missed the launch, NBC ran in Sunday newspapers across the country an illustrated advertisement displaying headshots of Allen, Bankhead, Carson, Durante, and Merman. The premiere opened with this introduction:

Tallulah Bankhead: This is radio, 1950. The greatest stars of our time on one big program. And the most fabulous part about this, dahlings, is that every Sunday we will present other stars of the same magnitude. Ah, pardon me if I sound like a name dropper, but, ah, just listen to three or four of the names we've lined up for next week's show: Groucho Marx, Fanny Brice, Jane Powell, and Ezio Pinnn-za! (Laughter) Well, now, don't just sit there with your mouths open, dahlings. I know what you're thinking: you think such a radio show every week is impossible. And I'm sure that, after you hear our first broadcast, you're going to say, "That show was impossible." (Laughter) Oh, no, that doesn't sound quite right, does it? (Laughter) But NBC says nothing is impossible. All it takes is courage, vision, and a king-sized bundle of dough. Each week, there will be comedy, drama, and music, all performed by the biggest stars of the time. Of course, dahlings, now and then a clinker may sneak in, but we're going to try.

Jimmy Durante: Just a minute, just a minute. I heard that last remark, and I resemble it!

As promised, the second week's program featured the guests Groucho Marx, Jane Powell, Ezio Pinza, and Fanny Brice, along with Hanley Stafford, Frank Lovejoy, David Brian and John Agar (the latter three recreating their screen roles in highlights from their current Warner Bros. picture, Breakthrough) [1]. The early shows were successful, and the program remained on Sunday nights from 6:00 to 7:30 PM ET during its first season, later shifting to 6:30 to 8:00 PM ET in its second season. NBC made significant efforts to prevent the predicted decline of radio, viewing The Big Show as a crucial element in this endeavor. Newsweek described it as "the biggest bang to hit radio since TV started." Demonstrating the significant investment in the program, budgets for individual installments could reach as high as $100,000.

The show's success was credited to Bankhead's notorious wit and ad-libbing ability in addition to the show's superior scripting. She had one of the funniest writers in the business on her staff: Goodman Ace, the mastermind of radio's legendary Easy Aces. She included renowned ad-libbers in the show—particularly Fred Allen (he and his longtime sidekick and wife, Portland Hoffa, appeared so often they could have been the show's regular co-hosts) and Groucho Marx, both of whom appeared on the first season's finale and appeared jointly on three other installments.

As recorded in her memoirs, Tallulah Bankhead accepted the role on the show due to financial need. However, she almost reconsidered when she became concerned that her role would be limited to that of a glorified mistress of ceremonies, merely introducing the feature performers without substantial involvement. "Guess what happened?" she continued. "Your heroine emerged from the fracas as the Queen of the Kilocycles. Authorities cried out that Tallulah had redeemed radio. In shepherding my charges through The Big Show, said the critics, I had snatched radio out of the grave. The autopsy was delayed."

== Top talent ==
David Stone Martin's illustration was used by NBC to promote Fanny Brice's "Baby Snooks" character. She was a guest on the second installment of The Big Show (November 12, 1950).

Each week, the show opened with Tallulah Bankhead subtly highlighting the high profile of the guests. Following her introduction, the guests would present themselves in alphabetical order, culminating with Bankhead's own distinctively raspy introduction, "And my name, darlings, is Tallulah Bankhead."

The show's lineup, including Allen and Marx, was a literal "who's who" of American entertainment of the time. They included film stars Ethel Barrymore, Charles Boyer, Gary Cooper, Marlene Dietrich, Douglas Fairbanks, Jr., Carmen Miranda, Bob Hope, Sam Levene, Martin and Lewis, Ginger Rogers, George Sanders, and Gloria Swanson; musical/comedy stage stars Eddie Cantor, Jimmy Durante, Judy Holliday, and Gordon MacRae; opera stars Lauritz Melchior and Robert Merrill; and jazz and popular music titans Andrews Sisters, Louis Armstrong, Peggy Lee, Rosemary Clooney, Perry Como, Billy Eckstine, Ella Fitzgerald, Benny Goodman, The Ink Spots, Frankie Laine, Judy Garland, Édith Piaf, Frank Sinatra, Rudy Vallée, and Sarah Vaughan.

The show also featured many of the nation's most familiar radio stars, some of whom were beginning to shine on the medium the show was intended to help hold at bay: Gertrude Berg (The Goldbergs), Milton Berle, Bob Cummings, Joan Davis, Ed Gardner (Archie from Duffy's Tavern), Phil Harris, Garry Moore, Jan Murray, Ozzie and Harriet Nelson (The Adventures of Ozzie and Harriet), Phil Silvers, Danny Thomas, Paul Winchell, and more.

Other shows in the radio universe were referenced. The Big Show's November 26, 1950, installment, for example, took the cast of Bankhead, Fred Allen, Jack Carson, Melchior, and Ed Wynn to the fictitious Duffy's Tavern, where Ed Gardner, in character as Archie the manager, awaited them.

Fred Allen, who often humorously referenced the decline of his own radio career, joined Tallulah Bankhead to recreate one of the most memorable routines from Allen's previous show: the "Mr. and Mrs. Breakfast Show." This routine sharply parodied the overly sentimental husband-and-wife morning shows that had become a radio staple a decade earlier. And it was on The Big Show's premiere that Allen delivered his famous wisecrack about TV: "Television is a new medium, and I have discovered why it's called a new medium—because nothing is well done."

"The Big Show was not just grander than most radio shows—it was also wittier, smoothly produced, smart, and ambitious, with an interesting juxtaposition of guests, but it wasn't significantly different," wrote radio historian Gerald Nachman in Raised on Radio. "It was just a more lavish, inflated revival of radio's earliest form—the variety showcase; you could almost hear the sequins." Yet Nachman admired the show, which he said was "as close to a Broadway show as radio could whip together each week."

== Finale ==
Except for special tributes (the series premiere, coinciding with the anniversary of George M. Cohan's death, was a particularly slam-bang tribute: a medley of Cohan musicals' signature songs), the show usually concluded with each guest taking a turn singing a line from music director Meredith Willson's composition "May the Good Lord Bless and Keep You," a touch that proved sentimental but not saccharine. So did Bankhead's likewise customary sign-off, wishing "Godspeed" to American armed forces around the world (who also listened to the program via the Armed Forces Radio Service).

In the surviving episodes, including the first-season finale, Tallulah Bankhead and her guests seamlessly navigate the comic banter and musical segments. Bankhead was supported by a top-tier musical director, Meredith Willson. The writing team, led by Goodman Ace, included Frank Wilson, who adapted movie scripts and short stories for the dramatic segments, as well as George Foster, Mort Greene, and Selma Diamond. Fred Allen, a longtime friend of Goodman Ace, contributed as well and is considered (at least by historian Nachman) to have been the show's unofficial script doctor. The show's announcers were Ed Herlihy and, when it occasionally originated from Hollywood, Jimmy Wallington.

NBC cancelled The Big Show after two seasons, reportedly having lost $1 million on the program. The show's financial difficulties were largely attributed to its inability to secure sufficient advertising sponsorship. During its first season, RCA Victor, American Home Products' Anacin, and Liggett & Myers' Chesterfield cigarettes sponsored the second half-hour (6:30–7:00 p.m.), but the network was unable to attract enough additional advertisers to sustain the program.

The show's audience was also affected by competition from CBS, which had acquired several popular former NBC radio programs, including The Jack Benny Program, which aired opposite The Big Show, as well as Amos 'n' Andy and The Edgar Bergen and Charlie McCarthy Show. Despite its cancellation, The Big Show has been regarded as one of the last major attempts to sustain traditional American radio variety programming during the rise of television.

Three 30-minute programs replaced The Big Show: Dimension X at 6 p.m. Eastern Time and The Amazing Mr. Malone at 6:30 p.m. E. T., and You Can't Take It With You at 7 p.m. E. T.

== Television ==
Dee Englebach, producer of The Big Show, sought to replicate the radio program's success on television with All Star Revue. Tallulah Bankhead joined as one of the rotating hosts, bringing the comedy antics and musical variety of The Big Show to the screen. The television series debuted on October 11, 1952, featuring a guest lineup that included Groucho Marx, Ethel Barrymore, Ben Grauer, and Meredith Willson. Bankhead continued to host the series until April 18, 1953.

In the spring of 1980, a 90-minute TV series titled The Big Show premiered on NBC. Nominated for several Emmy Awards, it nevertheless died a quick death after only a few months. Keith Olbermann's first MSNBC news show, which aired from 1997 to 1998, was titled The Big Show with Keith Olbermann.

== Sources ==
- Ace, Goodman. Interview with Richard Lamparski, WBAI, 1970.
- Ace, Goodman. The Better of Goodman Ace. New York: Doubleday, 1971.
- Bankhead, Tallulah. New York: Harper & Row, 1952.
- Carrier, Jeffrey L. Tallulah Bankhead: A Bio-Bibliography, page 35. Westport, Connecticut: Greenwood Press, 1991.
- Crosby, John. Out of the Blue. New York: Simon and Schuster, 1952.
- Nachman, Gerald. Raised on radio. New York: Pantheon Books, 1998.

== Listen to ==
- The Big Show in the Internet Archive's Old-Time Radio Collection.
