= Senator Claghorn =

Fictional character debuting in The Fred Allen Show

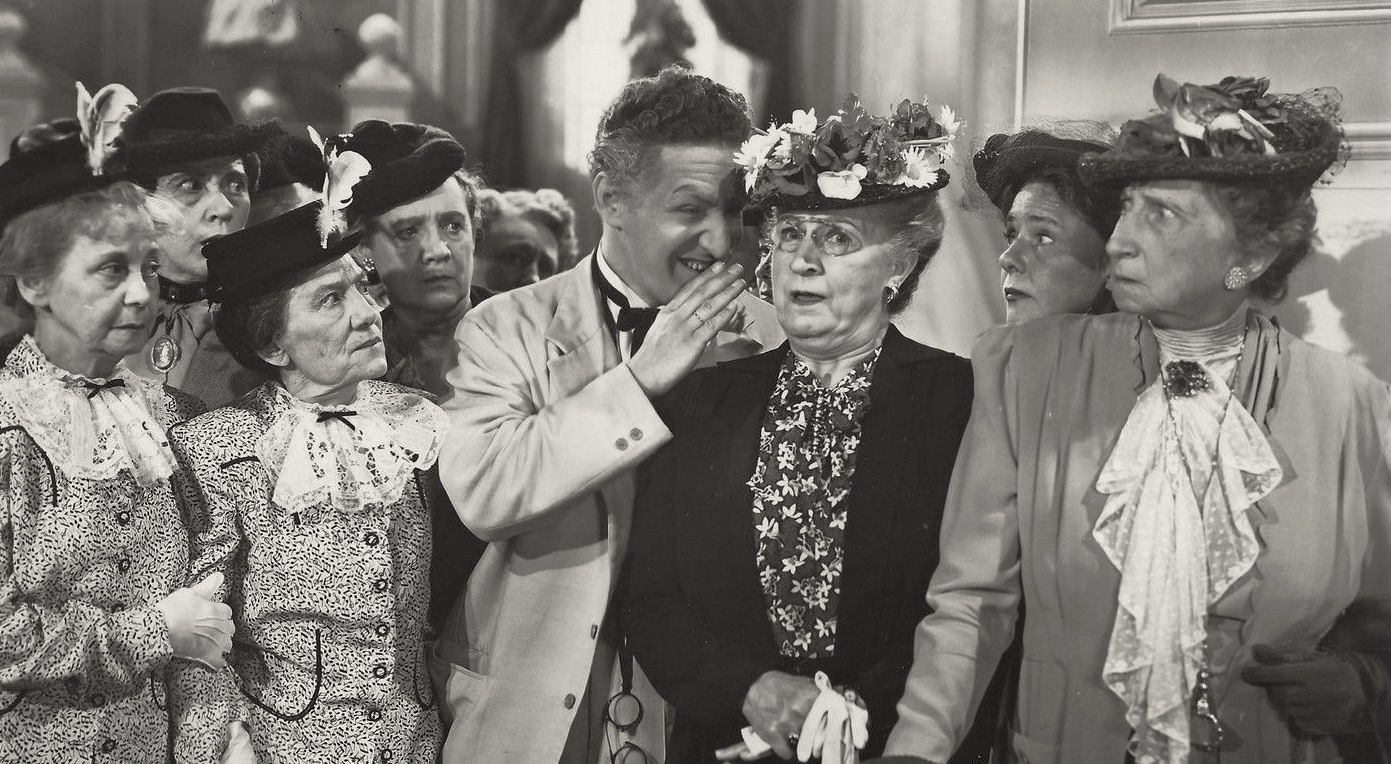
Delmar as Claghorn in It's a Joke, Son!

Senator Beauregard Claghorn was a popular fictional radio character on the "Allen's Alley" segment of The Fred Allen Show, beginning in 1945. Succeeding the vaguely similar but much less popular Senator Bloat from the earliest "Allen's Alley" routines, Senator Claghorn, portrayed by Allen's announcer Kenny Delmar, was a blustery Southern politician whose home was usually the first at which Allen would knock. Claghorn would typically answer the door with, "Somebody, ah say, somebody knocked! Claghorn's the name, Senator Claghorn, that is. I'm from the South. Suh."

== Description ==
Claghorn had an unshakable obsession with the South, and would happily complain about the North in dry ways. For instance, the Senator refused to ever wear a "Union suit" or drive through the Lincoln Tunnel when he visited New York City, and he claimed to drink only out of Dixie cups. At one point when asked which state he represented, he noted it was in the Gulf of Mexico, south of Alabama. The senator even rebuked Fred Allen for saying the word "no" in his presence, saying "N-O.. That's North abbreviated!!"

Some of the senator's other quotes include:

- "When I'm in New York I'll never go to Yankee Stadium!"
- "I won't even go to see the Giants unless a southpaw's pitchin'!"
- "I refuse to watch the Dodgers unless Dixie Walker's playin'!"
- "I won't go into a room unless it's got southern exposure!"
- "When I got the chickenpox, they were southern fried!"
- "The only plant life I have around my house is a Virginia creeper!"
- "Son, bend down and kiss my Jefferson Davis button!"

When Allen was finally able to speak to the senator, he would ask him a topical question, to which Claghorn would respond with a rapid stream of talk, shouting, repetition and puns. After a quip, the senator would laugh uproariously and utter one of his two catchphrases: "That's a joke, son!" or "Pay attention now, boy!" Claghorn would also make frequent jabs at Allen using colorful analogies that often resulted in loud laughter from the studio audience.

Delmar debuted Claghorn on Allen's broadcast of October 7, 1945, and the character remained until 1949, when the series transitioned from "Allen's Alley" to a "Main Street" segment to accommodate Allen's final sponsor, Ford. In one episode, Allen asked the senator how he was treating his insomnia, and the senator replied that he had sung himself to sleep with a southern lullaby:

"Rock-a-bye small fry, on the cotton tree top,
when the Southern wind blows, your cradle will rock,
when the wind's from the North, I say, baby you'll bawl,
for down will come cradle, tree and you all!"

In another exchange, Allen asked Claghorn whether Washington was helping to reduce an epidemic of colds afflicting the country. Claghorn responded: "The senate, I say the senate reconvened just in time. I was glad to see Senator [George] Aiken back. Achin' back! That's a joke, son." Further discussion regarding cold remedies resulted in this exchange:

Claghorn: I had a cold last week like to ruin my filibuster.
Allen: Ruin your filibuster? Well what did- (chuckling) what did you do?
Claghorn: I took an old Southern remedy, son. I drank down two buckets of hot mint julep.
Allen: (astonished) You drank two buckets of hot mint julep and you still held the floor?
Claghorn: Held the floor?! Son, I couldn't get up off'n it!

Allen's interview with Claghorn generally ended with him bellowing "So long! So long, that is!!" (usually over laughter and applause from the audience)

At the height of its popularity, the character was often mentioned or parodied on other programs, especially that of Allen's rival Jack Benny, with Phil Harris usually playing the part. Delmar made a guest appearance on The Jack Benny Program in the role on February 12, 1950, months after Allen's show had ended. The most famous parody is the Warner Bros. Looney Tunes animated character Foghorn Leghorn.

== Outside of radio ==
The Claghorn character also appeared in other media. Delmar played the character in commercials, on two records (I Love You, That Is and That's a Joke, Son), and a 1947 theatrical film titled It's a Joke, Son! with costar Una Merkel as Mrs. Claghorn. The film's plot involves the senator running for office against his wife. It's a Joke, Son! was produced on an unusually low $650,000 budget and suffered from poor box-office receipts, causing it to be pulled from some theaters after less than a week.

Delmar played a thinly veiled version of Claghorn, retitled Senator Hominy Smith, in the Broadway musical Texas Li'l Darlin. After Warner Bros. copyrighted Foghorn Leghorn, Delmar required the studio's permission to play the character elsewhere. In the 1960s, Delmar took his characterization and catchphrases back as the voice of the Hunter, a character on the animated series King Leonardo and His Short Subjects.

Dave Sim adopted the same speech patterns for Elrod the Albino, a character in his independent comic book Cerebus the Aardvark, but it is unknown whether the voice derived directly from Claghorn or from Foghorn Leghorn. Sim describes the character as "Elrod/Senator Claghorn" in the preface to the reprint of issue 51 in Cerebus Number Zero.

== Sources ==
- Dunning, John. On the Air: The Encyclopedia of Old-Time Radio. New York: Oxford University Press, 1998. ISBN 0-19-507678-8
