= Portland Hoffa =

American actress (1905–1990)

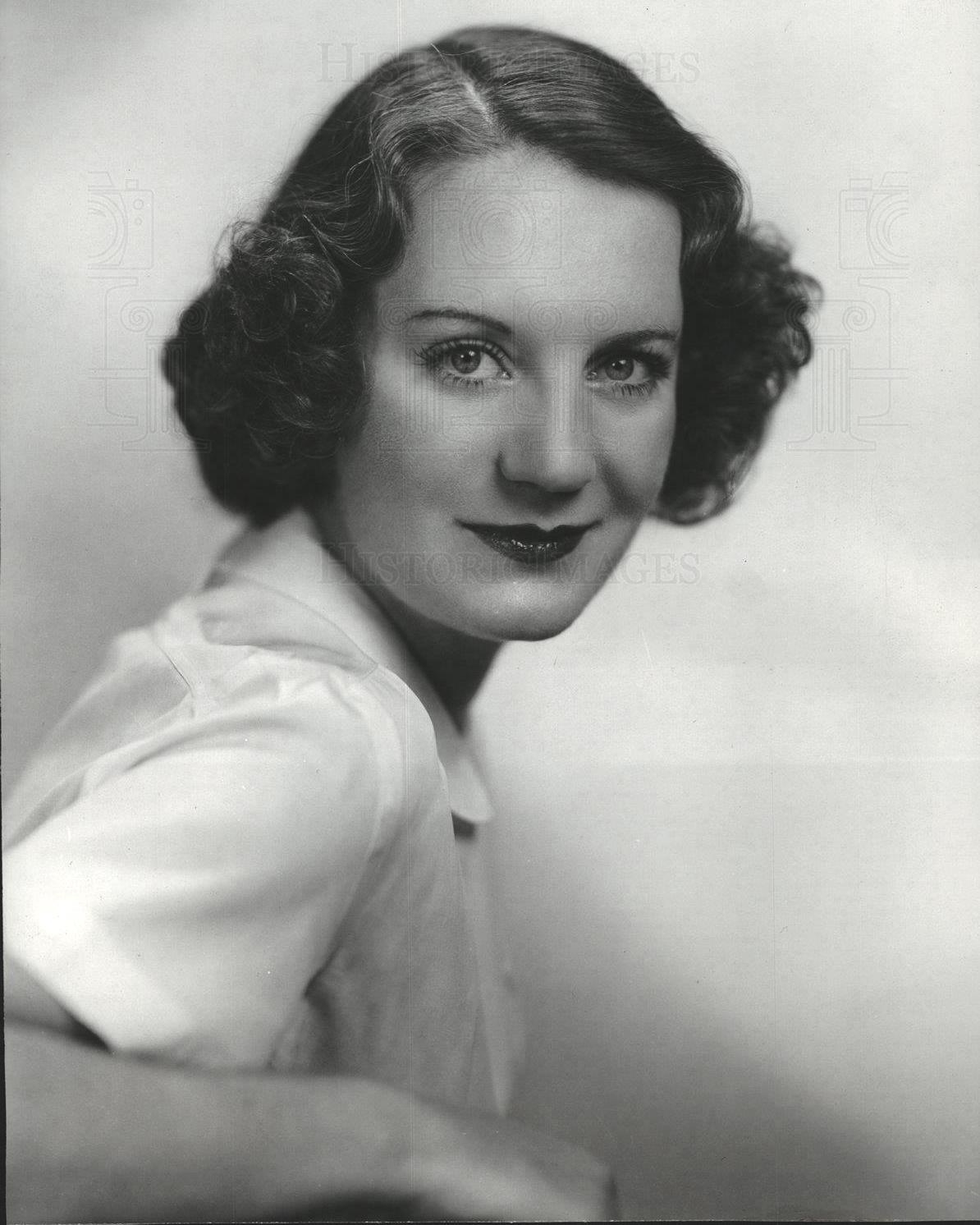
- Hoffa in 1940
- Born: January 25, 1905; Portland, Oregon, U.S.
- Died: December 26, 1990 (aged 85); Los Angeles, California, U.S.
- Occupations: Actress; comedian; dancer; radio host
- Spouses: Fred Allen (m. 1927; died 1956); Joe Rines (m. 1959; died 1986)

Portland Hoffa (January 25, 1905 – December 26, 1990) was an American comedian, radio host, actress, and dancer. The daughter of an itinerant optometrist, she was named after Portland, Oregon, the city in which she was born. She began her career performing as a dancer in numerous Broadway productions in the 1920s, before meeting her first husband, comedian Fred Allen. They were married in 1927, and Hoffa began performing characters with Allen in comic radio programs, often portraying a dimwitted female counterpart in fast-paced, witty skits. She gained particular notice from audiences for her distinctive, high-pitched voice.

Allen hosted several highly successful network radio shows in the 1930s and 1940s, in which Hoffa was a frequent participant. They remained married until his death in 1956; afterward she married bandleader Joe Rines, who later worked as an advertising executive. Hoffa helped compile her first husband's correspondence, which was published as Fred Allen's Letters in 1965. She died in 1990 in Los Angeles of natural causes, aged 85.

== Life and career ==
=== 1905–1921: Early life ===
Hoffa was born January 25, 1905, in Portland, Oregon (Note: Some news sources erroneously state that Hoffa was born in Portland, Maine, but this is disputed by several bibliographic sources that cite Portland, Oregon as her birthplace, as well as 1920 U.S. Census Records from when she resided with her family in New York City, that list her birthplace as Oregon.) to Frederick Hoffa and Mary Hoffa (née Keesey). As with most of her other siblings, including sister Lebanon and brother Harlem, she was named after the city in which she was born. Additionally, she had two younger sisters, Lastone and Doctor Fredericka known as Fredericka. Her father, an itinerant optometrist, was a native of Washington state of German descent, while her mother was from Pennsylvania. Her father was Jewish, while her mother was a Presbyterian. By the time Hoffa was 15 years old, she and her family had relocated to New York City and were residing in Manhattan.

=== 1922–1956: Performing career ===
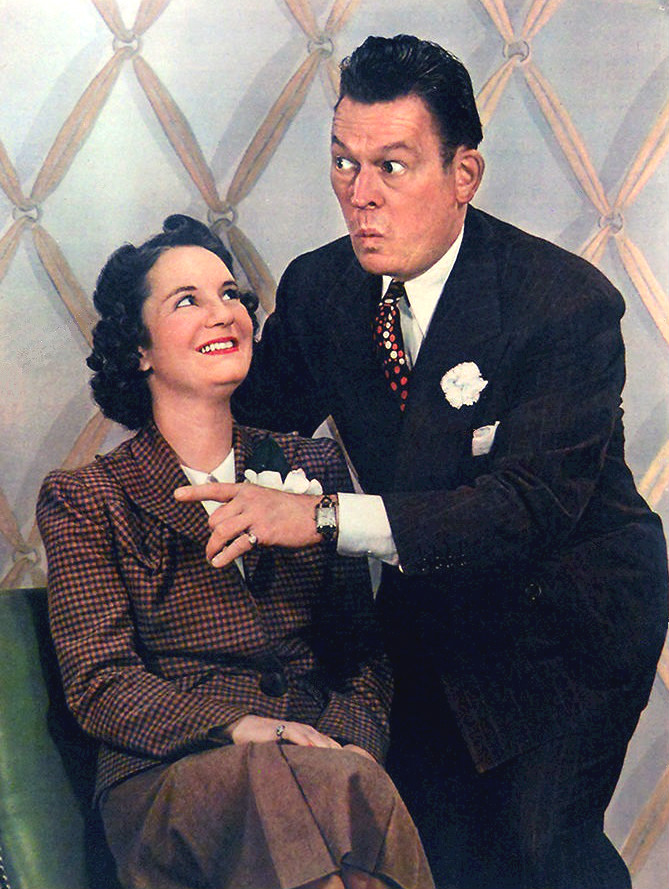
Hoffa and Fred Allen in 1941

In New York, Hoffa performed as a dancer in vaudeville and Broadway stage productions, and met Fred Allen while performing in The Passing Show in 1922 and joined him in his vaudeville routines (centered on his clever jokes spun off his weakness as a juggler). The couple married in 1927 at St. Malachy's Church in Manhattan before Allen began his long-running radio work in 1932. Because Allen was a devout Roman Catholic, Hoffa converted to Catholicism before the two married.

A frequent performer opposite Allen, Hoffa became familiar for her distinctive high-pitched voice, her brief routines involving jokes bounced off or from her mother, and, later, strolling Allen's Alley with her husband, after asking him what his question of the week for the Alley denizens would be. Allen himself likened Hoffa's voice to "two slate pencils mating or a clarinet reed calling for help."

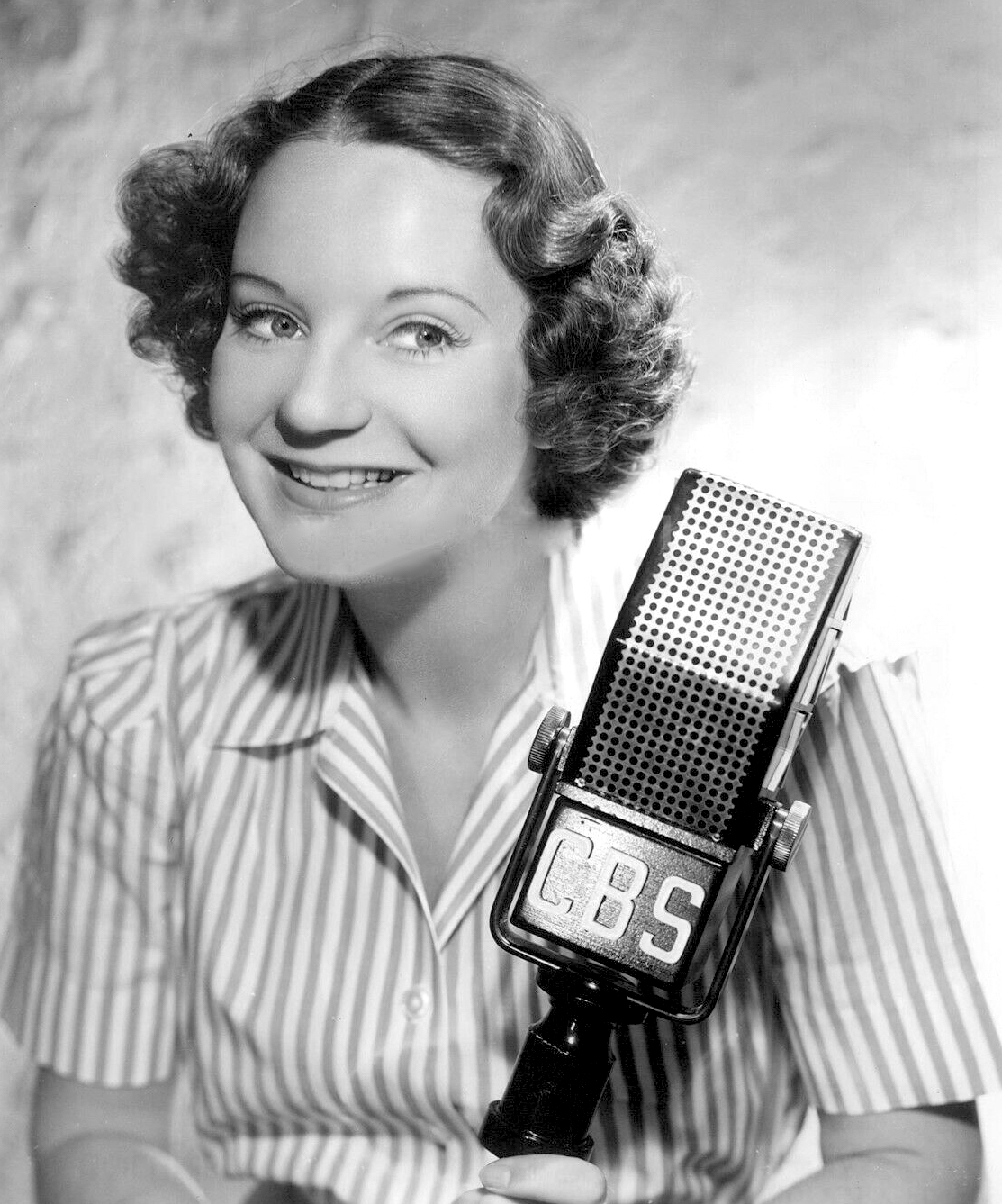
Press photo of Hoffa in 1940

Although Hoffa performed under her real name on her husband's show, the character she portrayed as "Portland Hoffa" in the radio broadcasts was not Allen's wife; instead, she depicted an enthusiastic girl of indeterminate age, around thirteen years old. One of Allen's sponsors loathed the character played by Hoffa, and kept urging Allen to drop her from the show. Allen ignored these requests for as long as he could, then finally—in an angry outburst at a sales meeting—told the executive that the broadcasts were bearable only due to Hoffa's presence, and that if she were removed from the program then Allen would quit.

Allen's declining health was the main reason he ceased hosting his own show after 1949, but Hoffa often joined him as a semi-regular on Tallulah Bankhead's radio variety show, The Big Show (1950–52). She also appeared as the "mystery guest" on one episode of television's What's My Line, on which Allen had become a panelist from 1954 until his death in early 1956. Hoffa and Allen had also appeared in such films as Is Everybody Listening? (1947) and the Jack Benny vehicle Buck Benny Rides Again (1940).

=== 1957–1990: Later years ===
Allen died in 1956. In 1959, Hoffa married bandleader Joe Rines, who later worked as an advertising executive. Hoffa and Rines lived long enough to celebrate a silver wedding anniversary. In 1965, she compiled a large volume of her first husband's correspondence, which was edited into and published as Fred Allen's Letters. Rines died in 1986.

== Death ==
Twice widowed, Hoffa died of natural causes in Los Angeles on December 26, 1990, aged 85. She was survived by her two younger sisters, Lastone Hershkowitz of New York and Los Angeles, and Frederika Bond of Bellingham, Washington. She is interred with her first husband Fred Allen at the Gate of Heaven Cemetery in Hawthorne, New York. Hoffa has a star on the Hollywood Walk of Fame at 1640 Vine Street.

== Filmography ==
Year	Title	Role	Notes	Ref.
1940	Buck Benny Rides Again	Herself (voice)		
1947	Is Everybody Listening?	Herself	Documentary film	
1954	Take Your Choice	Herself	Unaired gameshow pilot	
1954	Omnibus	Herself	Episode: "Treadmill to Oblivion"	
1955	What's My Line?	Herself	Season 6, episode 25	
1965	A 1960s Radio Broadcast Addition: Chase and Sandborn 101st Anniversary	Herself	Television film	

== Radio credits ==
Year	Title	Role	Notes	Ref.
1932–1949	The Fred Allen Show	Series regular		

== Stage credits ==
Year	Title	Role	Notes	Ref.
1921	The Mimic World	Performer	Century Promenade Theatre	
1922	Make It Snappy	Performer	Winter Garden Theatre	
1922	The Passing Show of 1922	Performer	Winter Garden Theatre	
1924	Marjorie	Performer	Shubert Theatre; 44th Street Theatre	
1925	Tell Me More	Performer	Gaiety Theatre	
1926–1927	George White's Scandals	Performer	Apollo Theatre	
1929–1930	The Little Show	Performer	Apollo Theatre	
1930–1931	Three's a Crowd	Performer	Selwyn Theatre	

== Sources ==
- DeLong, Thomas A. (1996). Radio Stars: An Illustrated Biographical Dictionary of 953 Performers, 1920 through 1960. Jefferson, North Carolina: McFarland. ISBN 978-0-7864-2834-2.
- Fuller-Seeley, Kathryn (2017). Jack Benny and the Golden Age of American Radio Comedy. Berkeley: University of California Press. ISBN 978-0-520-29504-9.
- Laurie, Joe Jr. (1953). Vaudeville: From the Honky-tonks to the Palace. New York: Henry Holt.
- Pitts, Michael (2012). Western Movies: A Guide to 5,105 Feature Films (2nd ed.). Jefferson, North Carolina: McFarland. ISBN 978-1-476-60090-1.
- Poupard, Dennis (2000). Twentieth-Century Literary Criticism. Detroit, Michigan: Gale Research Company. ISBN 978-0-787-62739-3.
- Terrace, Vincent (2018). Encyclopedia of Unaired Television Pilots, 1945–2018. Jefferson, North Carolina: McFarland. ISBN 978-1-476-67206-9.
- Unterbrink, Mary (1987). Funny Women: American Comediennes, 1860–1985. Jefferson, North Carolina: McFarland. ISBN 978-0-899-50226-7.
- Warner, Sam Bass Jr. (2004). "Introduction: O'Connor's Boston". In O'Connor, Thomas; O'Toole, James; Quigley, James (eds.). Boston's Histories: Essays in Honor of Thomas H. O'Connor. Boston: Northeastern University Press. pp. 3–13. ISBN 978-1-555-53582-7.
- Wertheim, Arthur Frank (1979). Radio Comedy. Oxford: Oxford University Press. ISBN 978-0-195-02481-4.
