= Fred Allen =

American comedian (1894–1956)

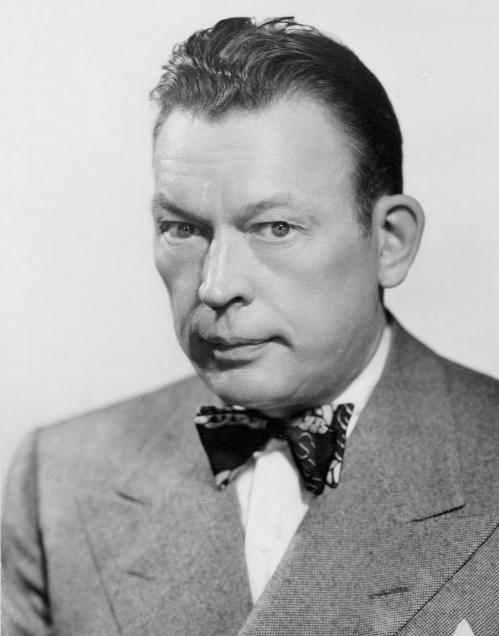
- Fred Allen circa 1940
- Born: John Florence Sullivan; May 31, 1894; Cambridge, Massachusetts, U.S.
- Died: March 17, 1956 (aged 61); New York City, U.S.
- Years active: 1914–1956
- Spouse: Portland Hoffa (m. 1927)
- Presenting career
- Show: The Fred Allen Show
- Network: CBS, NBC
- Style: Comedian
- Country: United States

John Florence Sullivan (May 31, 1894 – March 17, 1956), known professionally as Fred Allen, was an American comedian. His absurdist, topically pointed radio program The Fred Allen Show (1932–1949) made him one of the most popular and forward-looking humorists in the Golden Age of American radio.

His best-remembered gag was his long-running mock feud with friend and fellow comedian Jack Benny, but that was only part of his appeal. Radio historian John Dunning wrote that Allen was perhaps radio's most admired comedian and most frequently censored. A master ad libber, Allen often tangled with his network's executives and often barbed them on the air over the battles while developing routines whose style and substance influenced fellow comic talents, including Groucho Marx, Stan Freberg, Henry Morgan, and Johnny Carson; his avowed fans also included President Franklin D. Roosevelt, humorist James Thurber, and novelists William Faulkner, John Steinbeck, and Herman Wouk, who began his career writing for Allen.

Allen was honored with stars on the Hollywood Walk of Fame for contributions to television and radio.

== Early life ==
John Florence Sullivan was born in Cambridge, Massachusetts, to Irish Catholic parents. Allen barely knew his mother, Cecilia (née Herlihy) Sullivan, who died of pneumonia when he was not quite three years old. Along with his father, James Henry Sullivan, and his infant brother Robert, Allen was taken in by one of his mother's sisters, "my aunt Lizzie", around whom he focused the first chapter of his second memoir, Much Ado About Me. His father was so shattered by his mother's death that according to Allen, he drank more heavily. His aunt suffered as well; her husband, Michael, was partially paralyzed by lead poisoning shortly after they married, which left him mostly unable to work; Allen remembered that as causing contention among Lizzie's sisters. Eventually, Allen's father remarried and offered his sons the choice between coming with him and his new wife or staying with Aunt Lizzie. Allen's younger brother chose to go with their father, but Allen decided to stay with his aunt. "I never regretted it," he wrote.

== Religion ==
Allen was a Catholic and regularly attended Mass at St. Malachy's Church in Manhattan.

== Vaudeville ==
Allen took piano lessons as a boy, his father having brought an Emerson upright along when they moved in with his aunt. He learned exactly two songs, "Hiawatha" and "Pitter, Patter, Little Raindrops," and would be asked to play "half or all my repertoire" when visitors came to the house. He also worked at the Boston Public Library, where he discovered a book about the origin and the development of comedy. Enduring various upheavals at home (other aunts came and went, which prompted several moves), Allen also took up juggling while he learned as much as possible about comedy.

Some library co-workers planned to put on a show and asked him to do a bit of juggling and some of his comedy. When a girl in the crowd told him, "You're crazy to keep working here at the library; you ought to go on stage," Allen decided that his career path was set.

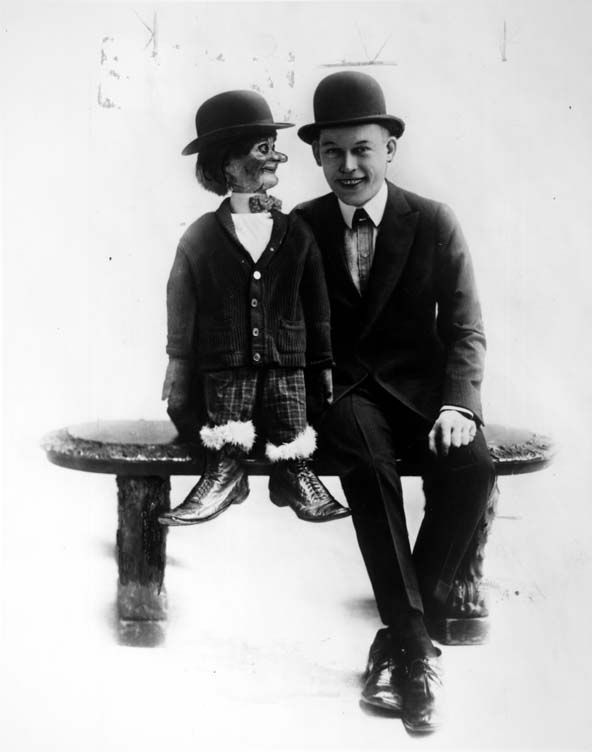
Fred Allen with dummy, circa 1916.

In 1914, at the age of 20, Allen took a job with a local piano company, in addition to his library work. He appeared at a number of amateur night competitions, soon took the stage name Fred St. James, and booked with the local vaudeville circuit at $30 a week (equal to $964 today), enough at the time to allow him to quit his jobs with the library and the piano company. Eventually, he became "Freddy James" and often billed himself as the world's worst juggler. Allen refined the mix of his deliberately clumsy juggling and the standard jokes and one-liners. He directed much of the humor at his own poor juggling abilities. During his time in vaudeville, his act evolved more toward monologic comedy and less juggling. In 1917, returning to the New York circuit, his stage name was changed to Fred Allen so that he would not be offered the same low salary that theater owners had been accustomed to paying him in his early career. His new surname came from Edgar Allen, a booker for the Fox theaters.

In 1922, Allen commissioned comic-strip artist Martin Branner to cover a theater curtain with an elaborate mural painting depicting a cemetery with a punchline on each gravestone. It was the "Old Joke Cemetery," where overworked gags go to die. In Allen's act, the audiences would see the curtain (and have several minutes to read its 46 punchlines) before Allen made his entrance. Audiences typically would be laughing at the curtain before Allen even appeared. Robert Taylor's biography of Allen includes an impressive full-length photo of Branner's curtain painting, and many of the punchlines are clearly legible in the photo.

Allen used a variety of gimmicks in his changing act from a ventriloquist dummy to juggling to singing, but the focus was always on his comedy, which was heavy on wordplay. One recurring bit was to read a purported "letter from home" with material such as the following:

"The man next door has bought pigs; we got wind of it this morning. Your father had a terrible fight with him about it, and the man hit your father with a rock in the left ear. It didn't bother your father; he is stone deaf in that ear. The policeman who took him away said that he would get his hearing in the morning. The other man, the one who owns the pigs, was arrested for fragrancy.... There is no other news except that our oil stove exploded yesterday and blew your father and me out into the backyard. It is the first time we have been out together for twenty years.

Allen's wit was at times intended not for the vaudeville audience but rather for other professionals in show business. After one of his appearances failed one day, Allen made the best of it by circulating an obituary of his act on black-bordered funeral stationery. He also mailed vials of his supposed "flop sweat" to newspapers as part of his comic self-promotion.

In 1921, Fred Allen and Nora Bayes toured with the company of Lew Fields. Their musical director was nineteen-year-old Richard Rodgers. Many years later, when he and Oscar Hammerstein II appeared as mystery guests on What's My Line?, Rodgers recalled Allen's act of sitting on the edge of the stage with his legs dangling down, playing a banjo, and telling jokes.

== Broadway ==
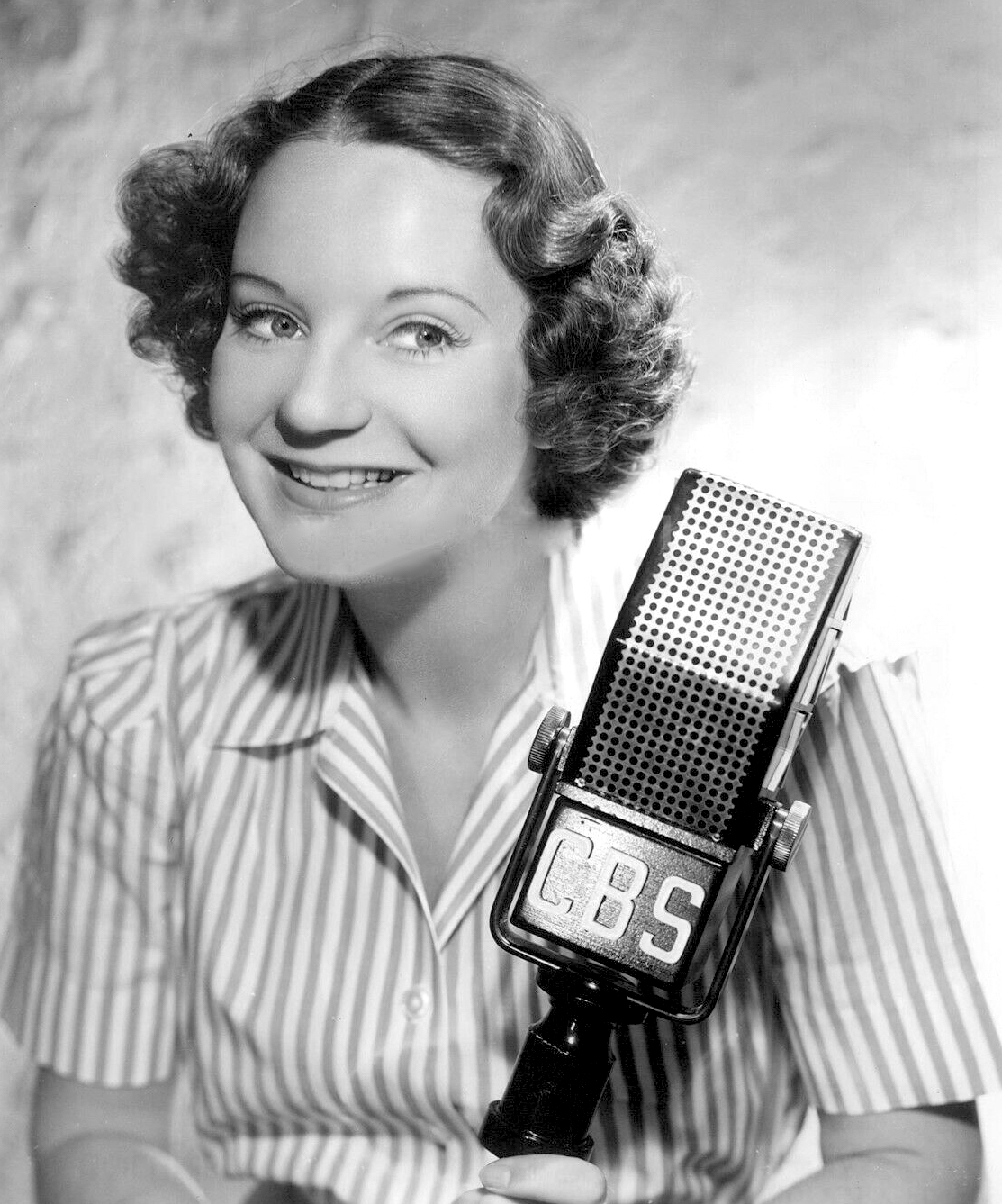
Wife Portland Hoffa, 1940

Allen temporarily left vaudeville, moving to work in such Shubert Brothers stage productions as The Passing Show in 1922. The show played well in its runup to Broadway but lasted only ten weeks at the Winter Garden Theatre. Portland Hoffa, who was in the chorus of the show, was eventually to marry Allen.

He received good notices for his comic work in several of the productions, particularly Vogues and Greenwich Village Follies, and continued to develop his comic writing. He even wrote a column for Variety called "Near Fun." A salary dispute ended the column; Allen wanted only $60 a week (equal to $1,154 today) to give up his theater work to become a full-time columnist, but his editor tried a sleight of hand, based on the paper's ad rates, to deny him. He spent his summer in Boston, honed his comic and writing skills even further, worked in a "respectfully" received duo that billed themselves as Fink and Smith, and played a few of the dying vaudeville houses.

Allen returned to New York to the pleasant surprise that Portland Hoffa was taking instruction to convert to Roman Catholicism. After the couple married, Allen began writing material for them to use together ("With a vaudeville act, Portland and I could be together, even if we couldn't find any work"), and the couple divided their time between the show business circuit, Allen's New England family home and Old Orchard Beach, Maine, in the summers.

== Radio ==
Allen's first taste of radio came while he and Hoffa waited for a promised slot in a new Arthur Hammerstein musical. In the interim, they appeared on a Chicago station's program, WLS Showboat, into which Allen recalled, "Portland and I were presented... to inject a little class into it." Their success in these appearances helped their theater reception. Live audiences in the Midwest liked to see their radio favorites in person even if Allen and Hoffa would be replaced by Bob Hope when the radio show moved to New York several months afterward.

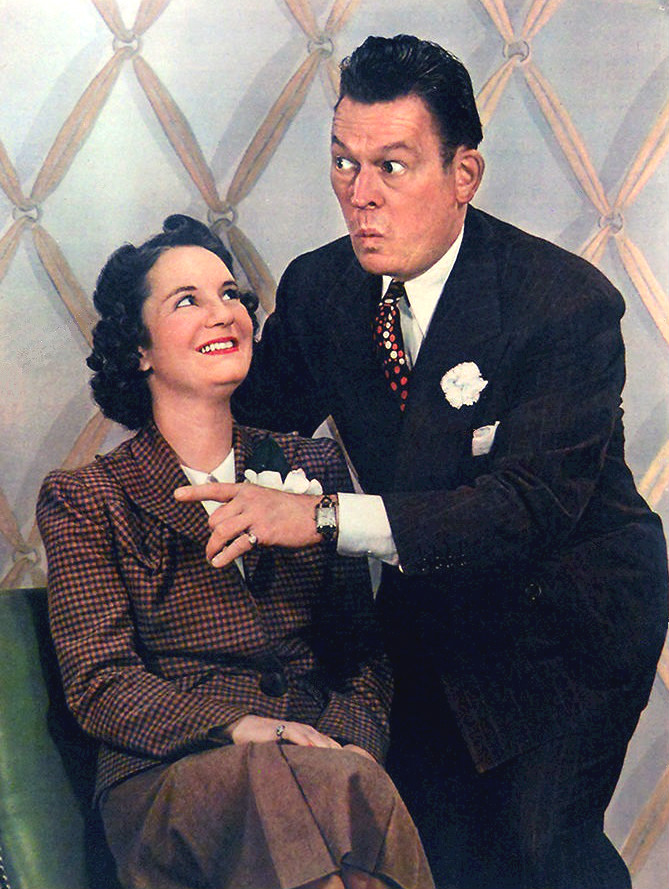
Fred Allen and wife Portland Hoffa, 1941

The couple eventually got their Hammerstein show, Polly, which opened in Delaware and made the usual tour before hitting Broadway. Also in that cast was a young Englishman named Archie Leach, who received as many good notices for his romantic appeal as Allen got for his comic work. Hammerstein retooled the show before he brought it to New York by replacing everyone but two women and Allen. Leach decided to buy an old car and drive to Hollywood. "What Archie Leach didn't tell me," Allen remembered, "was that he was going to change his name to Cary Grant."

Polly never succeeded in spite of several retoolings, but Allen went on to successful shows like The Little Show (1929–30) and Three's a Crowd (1930–31), which eventually led to his full-time entry to radio in 1932.

=== Town Hall Tonight ===
Allen first hosted The Linit Bath Club Revue on CBS and moved the show to NBC to become The Salad Bowl Revue (in a nod to new sponsor Hellmann's Mayonnaise, which was marketed by the parent company of Linit) later in the year. The show became The Sal Hepatica Revue (1933–34), The Hour of Smiles (1934–35), and finally Town Hall Tonight (1935–39). In 1939–40, however, sponsor Bristol-Myers, which advertised Ipana toothpaste as well as Sal Hepatica during the program, altered the title to The Fred Allen Show over his objections. Allen's perfectionism (odd to some because of his deft ad libs) caused him to leap from sponsor to sponsor until Town Hall Tonight allowed him to set his chosen small-town milieu and establish himself as a bona fide radio star.

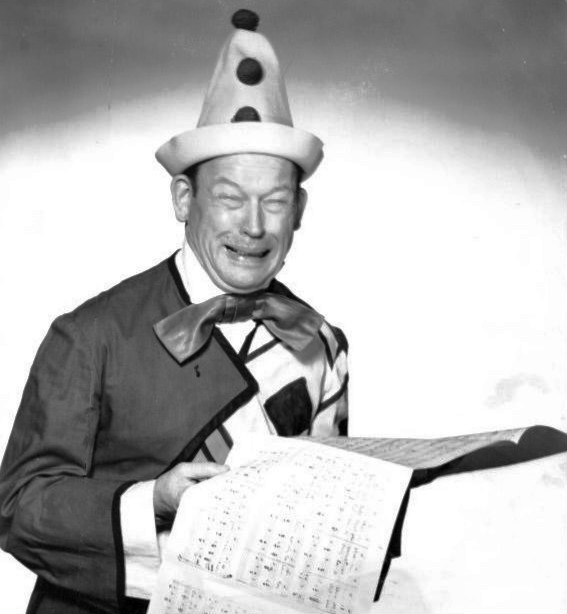
Publicity photo for the premiere of Texaco Star Theater, 1940.

The hour-long show featured segments that would influence radio and, much later, television. News satires such as Rowan and Martin's Laugh-In's "Laugh-In Looks at the News" and Saturday Night Live's "Weekend Update" were influenced by Town Hall Tonight's "The News Reel", later renamed "Town Hall News" (and in 1939–40, as a sop to his sponsor, "Ipana News"). The Tonight Show Starring Johnny Carson's "Mighty Carson Art Players" routines referred to the Mighty Allen Art Players in name and sometimes in routines.

Allen and company also satirized popular musical comedies and films of the day, including and especially Oklahoma!. Allen also did semi-satirical interpretations of well-known lives, including his own.

The show that became Town Hall Tonight was the longest-running hour-long comedy-based show in classic radio history. In 1940, Allen moved back to CBS Radio with a new sponsor and show name, Texaco Star Theater, airing every Wednesday at 9:00 pm ET on CBS, then Sundays at 9:00 pm in the fall of 1941. By 1942, he shortened the show to half an hour, at 9:30 pm ET, under the edicts of the network and sponsor. He also chafed under being forced to give up a Town Hall Tonight signature of using barely known and amateur guests effectively in favor of booking more recognizable guests although he liked many of them. Guests included singers from Kingston, New York, the original woman behind the "Aunt Jemima" on pancake boxes, and singer Donald Gardner from Saugerties, New York.

Allen held himself personally responsible for the show's success and devoted much of his time to writing and rewriting routines and scripts. The overwork took a heavy toll on his health. His condition was diagnosed as hypertension, and he was forced to take more than a year off.

== Film ==
Concurrent with his radio duties, Allen made occasional motion pictures by appearing in seven full-length features and three shorts between 1929 and 1952. His first film, filmed by Paramount Pictures at its New York studio, was The Installment Collector (1929), a nine-minute adaptation of one of his vaudeville acts in which he remits a succession of personal articles to an insistent debt collector. Allen followed it with two shorts for Vitaphone, also filmed in New York.

By 1935 Allen was firmly established as a radio personality, and Hollywood wanted to cash in on his popularity. He signed with 20th Century-Fox to appear in two feature films. The first was the Dick Powell musical comedy Thanks a Million (1935), which Andre Sennwald of The New York Times reviewed by naming only Allen in its headline. Allen owed Fox a second film but his busy radio schedule in New York kept him away from the movie studio. It wasn't until 1937 that Allen was able to fulfill the movie commitment, which became the Alice Faye musical Sally, Irene and Mary (released in March 1938). Allen never thought of himself as having movie-star looks -- "I always come off like a dufflebag with a nose, photogenically"—and confined himself to only occasional screen appearances. In 1940, Love Thy Neighbor played off the comic feud with Jack Benny. Allen's sole leading role was as flea circus impresario Fred F. Trumble Floogle in the frenetic It's in the Bag!, a loose adaptation of Ilf and Petrov's novel The Twelve Chairs. Allen returned to Fox in 1952 for two final films: We're Not Married and O. Henry's Full House (in the "Ransom of Red Chief" sequence, deleted from the first-run theatrical release but later reinstated).

== Return to radio ==
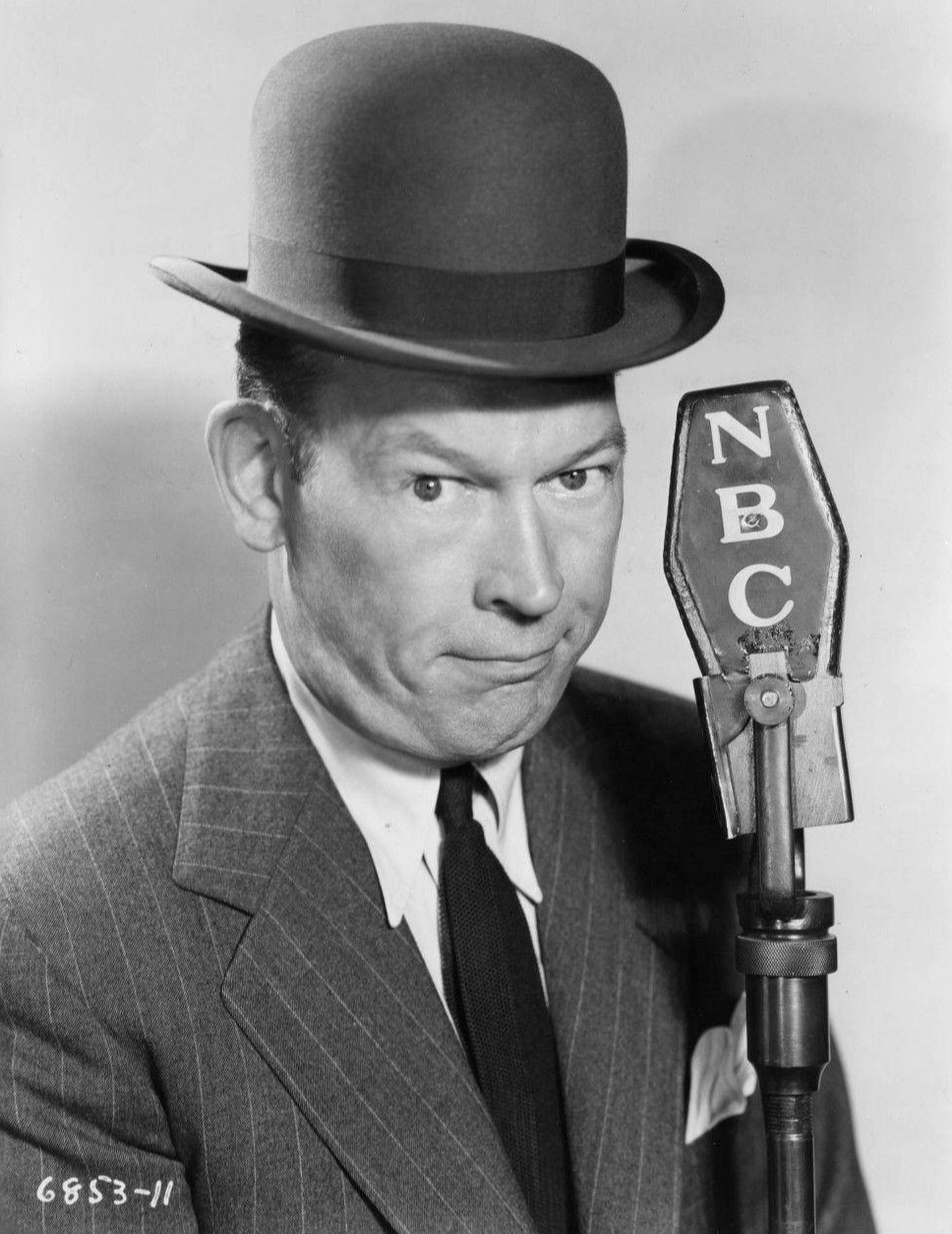
Allen on radio in 1937

In 1945 The Fred Allen Show returned to NBC, Sunday nights at 8:30 p.m. EST. Standard Brands' Blue Bonnet Margarine and Tender Leaf Tea, and later, Ford Motor Company, were the sponsors for the rest of the show's run. (Texaco revived Texaco Star Theater in 1948 on radio, and more successfully on television, making an American icon out of star Milton Berle).

Allen again made a few changes, including the singing DeMarco Sisters to whom he had been tipped by arranger-composer Gordon Jenkins. "We did four years with Mr. Allen and got one thousand dollars a week," Gloria DeMarco remembered. "Sunday night was the best night on radio." Sunday night with Fred Allen seemed incomplete on any night that listeners did not hear the DeMarco Sisters, whose breezy, harmonious style became as familiar as their cheerfully sung "Mr. Al-len, Mr. Alll-llennnn" in the show's opening theme. During the theme's brief pause, Allen would say something like, "It isn't the mayor of Anaheim, Azusa, and Cucamonga, kiddies." That device became a signature for three of the four years.

=== Allen's Alley ===
The other change, born in the Texaco days and evolving from his earlier news spoofs, proved his most enduring, premiering December 6, 1942. The inspiration for the mythical Main Street of "Allen's Alley" came from the small-town heartland folks who were often profiled in the newspaper columns written by O. O. McIntyre (1884–1938), one of the most popular columnists of the 1930s, with some seven million readers.

"Allen's Alley" followed a brief Allen monologue and comic segment with Hoffa ("Misssss-ter Allll-llennnn!"), usually involving gags that she instigated about her family. Then, a brief music interlude would symbolize the two making their way to the fictitious Alley.

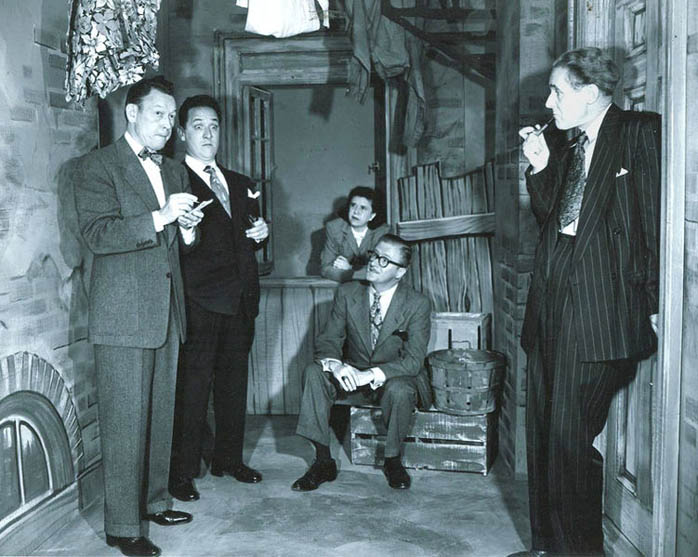
The Allen's Alley cast (l to r): Fred Allen, Kenny Delmar, Minerva Pious, Peter Donald, Parker Fennelly.

The segment was always launched by a quick exchange that began with Hoffa asking Allen what he would ask the Alley denizens that week. After she implored him, "Shall we go?" Allen would reply with cracks like, "As the two drumsticks said when they spotted the tympani, let's beat it!'" or "As one strapless gown said to the other strapless gown, 'What's holding us up?'"

A small host of stereotypical characters greeted Allen and Hoffa down the Alley, discussing Allen's question of the week, usually drawing on news items or popular happenings around town, whether gas rationing, traffic congestion, the Pulitzer Prizes, postwar holiday travel, or the annual Ringling Brothers and Barnum & Bailey Circus visit.

The Alley went through a few changes in the first installments. Early denizens included sarcastic John Doe (John Brown), self-possessed Senator Bloat and town drunk Sampson Souse (Jack Smart), dimwitted Socrates Mulligan (Charlie Cantor), pompous poet Falstaff Openshaw (Alan Reed), and wry Jewish housewife Pansy Nussbaum (Minerva Pious). By 1945, Pious and Reed were joined by two new Alley denizens: Parker Fennelly as stoic New England farmer Titus Moody, and Kenny Delmar, the new show's announcer, as bellowing Southern senator Beauregard Claghorn. Pious is credited with bringing Delmar to Allen's attention. Delmar based the blowhard character on a real-life person he had encountered while hitchhiking in 1928; Delmar had originally named the voice characterization "Dynamite Gus." Within weeks, Claghorn became one of the leading comedy characters of radio as listeners across the country began quoting his catchphrases: "Somebody, Ah say, somebody knocked"; "I'm from the South, Suh"; "That's a joke, son"; and "Pay attention, boy!" Claghorn served as the model for the Warner Bros. cartoon character Foghorn Leghorn, who first appeared the following August in the Oscar-nominated Walky Talky Hawky.

Other characters had catchphrases that were almost as famous as Claghorn's, such as Titus Moody's "Howdy, Bub", and Falstaff Openshaw's "That is precisely why I am here." Mrs. Nussbaum always greeted Allen by saying, "You were expecting maybe...", and then she would mispronounce the name of a glamorous film star, such as "Too-ra-loo-ra-loo-ra Bankhead?" The Alley sketches made only one further cast change, when Peter Donald's chipper Irishman Ajax Cassidy succeeded Reed's Falstaff.

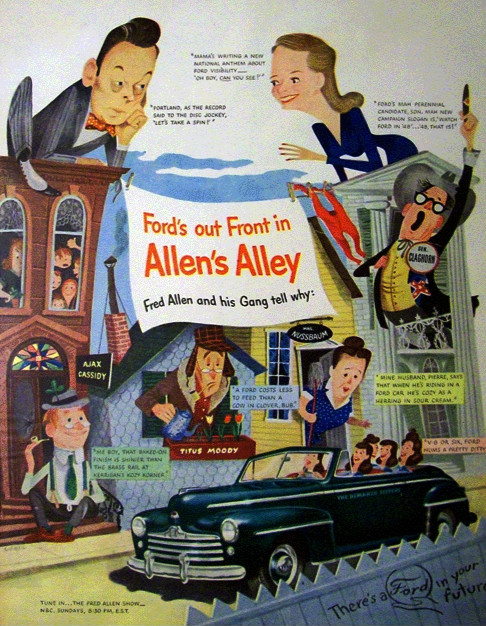
The show was popular enough for Ford Motor Company to feature it in a Life magazine ad in April 1948.

Despite the ethnic diversity, the Alley characters seemed less citified and more akin with O. O. McIntyre's small-town America. Allen's topical humor is sometimes thought an acquired taste for audiences curious about his generation of radio stars; Dunning has written that when he "went into topical humor, he may have forfeited his only opportunity to be the Mark Twain of his century. He had flashes of undeniable brilliance. But the main body of his work deals with the day-to-day fodder of another time, and sons have seldom been amused by the embarrassments or tragedies of their fathers."

Nonetheless, others find many parallels to today's world and its absurdities. The "Allen's Alley" stereotypes make some cringe, as Allen biographer Robert Taylor noted (in Fred Allen: His Life and Wit), but others find them lancing more than lauding stereotypes, letting listeners make up their own minds about how foolish they could be. "Interestingly enough," wrote Frank Buxton and Bill Owen in The Big Broadcast 1920-1950, "[Claghorn, Nussbaum, Moody, and Cassidy] were never criticized as being anti-Southern, anti-Semitic, anti-New England, or anti-Irish. The warmth and good humor with which they were presented made them acceptable even to the most sensitive listeners."

Allen employed a writing staff, but it served as his sounding boards and early draft consultants as much as actual writers. It was Allen who had the final edit, rewrote each week's script, and worked as long as 12 hours a day on ideas or sketches.

His unscheduled departures from the script caused many a show to run overtime. On these occasions Allen sometimes signed off with "We're a little late so good night, folks", but more often Allen and his cast were still doing a comedy sketch when time ran out, forcing the network to cut the show short and insert a network identification. Allen's habit of signing off late affected fellow former vaudevillian Phil Baker. Baker's "$64 question" quiz show Take It or Leave It immediately followed the Allen show and, thanks to Allen, would have to start a minute or two late. Baker hatched a comic plan to remedy the situation. He kept track of how much time he was losing to Allen over a period of a few months, and when the total reached 15 minutes, Baker barged into the studio 15 minutes earlier than scheduled, while Allen was on the air. Baker took over both Allen's show and his audience, welcoming everyone to Take It or Leave It. Allen, aghast but amused, surrendered the microphone to Baker. Allen's parting shot was, "I'll write a letter to Senator Claghorn about this!"

Allen also "died" more eloquently than other radio comics, particularly in the later years. When a joke was greeted with an awkward silence, Allen would comment on the lack of response with his ad-libbed "explanation" almost always funnier than the original joke, a technique that was later adopted successfully by Johnny Carson.

=== Closing the Alley ===
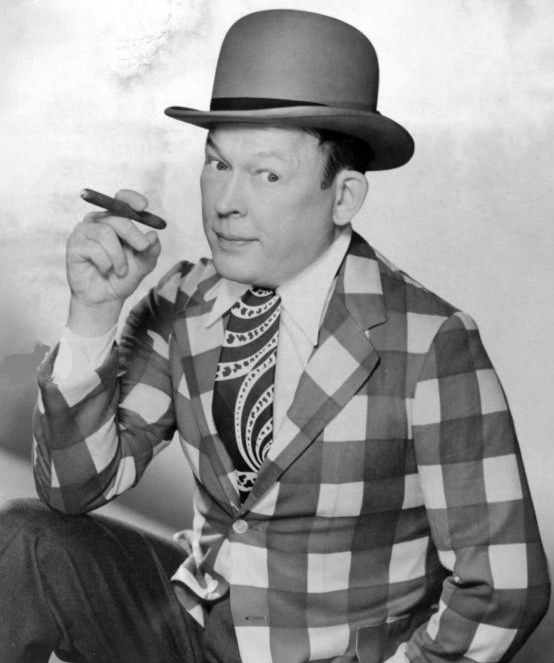
Allen on the Texaco Star Theater in 1940

The Fred Allen Show was radio's top-rated show of the 1946–47 season. Allen was able to negotiate a lucrative new contract as a result not only of the show's success but also in large measure to NBC's anxiety to keep more of its stars from joining Jack Benny in a wholesale defection to CBS as well as to retain its services for its rapidly expanding television programming. The CBS talent raids broke up NBC's hit Sunday night, and Benny also convinced George Burns and Gracie Allen and Bing Crosby to join his move.

A year later, however, Fred Allen was knocked off his perch not by a talent raid but by a show on a third rival network, ABC (the former NBC Blue network). The quiz show Stop the Music, hosted by Bert Parks (debuted 1948), required listeners to participate live by telephone. The show became a big enough hit to break into Allen's grip on that Sunday night-time slot. At first, Allen fought fire with his own kind of fire: he offered $5,000 to listeners getting a call from Stop the Music or any similar game show while they listened to The Fred Allen Show. He never had to pay up, and he was not shy about lampooning the game-show phenomenon (especially a riotous parody of another quiz show that Parks hosted by launching Break the Bank in a routine called "Break the Contestant" in which players did not receive a thing but were compelled to give up possessions when they blew a question).

Unfortunately, Allen fell to number 38 in the radio ratings, which was compounded by the rise of television in many major cities. By then, he had changed the show again somewhat with the famed "Allen's Alley" skits now taking place on "Main Street" and rotating a new character or two in and out of the lineup. He stepped down from radio again in 1949, at the end of his show's regular season, as much under his doctor's orders (for Allen's continued hypertension) as because of his slipping ratings. He decided to take a year off, but it did more for his health than his career. After the June 26, 1949 show on which Henry Morgan and Jack Benny guested, Allen never hosted another radio show full-time again.

=== "Feud" with Jack Benny ===
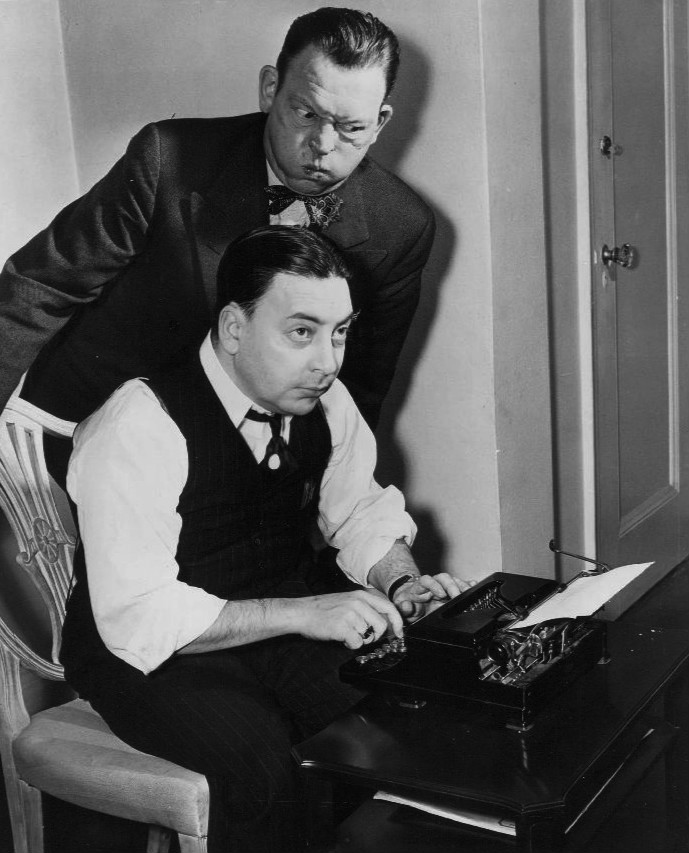
Allen and columnist Earl Wilson, 1949

Good friends in real life, Fred Allen and Jack Benny inadvertently hatched a running gag in 1937 when a child prodigy, the violinist Stuart Canin, gave a very credible performance on the Allen show and inspired an Allen wisecrack about "a certain alleged violinist" who should hide in shame over his poor playing. Allen often mentioned his show-business friends on the air ("Mr. Jacob Haley of Newton Highlands, Massachusetts" was Allen's way of saying hello to his pal Jack Haley), and on the Canin broadcast Allen knew Benny would be listening. Benny, according to Allen biographer Taylor, burst out laughing, then responded in kind on his own program. The rivalry gag went on for a decade and convinced some fans that the two comedians really were blood enemies.

The Allen-Benny feud was the longest-playing, best-remembered dialogic running gag in classic radio history. The gag even pushed toward a boxing match between the two comedians and the promised event was a sellout, but the match never occurred. The pair even appeared together in two films, Love Thy Neighbor (1940) and It's in the Bag! (1945).

Some of the feud's highlights involved Al Boasberg, who is credited with helping Benny refine his character into what may have been America's first stand-up comedian. Boasberg was well known behind the scenes as a top comedy writer and script doctor, but he seldom received recognition in public. He worked, uncredited, on many films (including the Marx Brothers' hits A Night at the Opera and A Day at the Races). Steaming mad because of his long battles for recognition, Boasberg was said to have delivered a tirade that ended up (in slightly altered form) in an Allen-Benny feud routine:

ALLEN: Why, you fugitive from a Ripley cartoon ... I'll knock you flatter than the first eight minutes of this program.

BENNY: You ought to do well in pictures, Mr. Allen, now that Boris Karloff is back in England.

ALLEN: Why, if I was a horse, a pony even, and found out that any part of my tail was used in your violin bow, I'd hang my head in my oatbag from then on.

Benny's side of the feud included a tart interpretation of Allen's Town Hall Tonight show, which Benny and company called "Clown Hall Tonight." A signature element of the feud was that, whenever one guested on the other's shows, the host would tend to hand the guest the best lines of the night. (Both Benny and Allen revealed later that each man's writers consulted with each other on routines involving the feud.) As Benny said in his co-memoir, Sunday Nights at Seven, "[T]he sky was the limit. Or rather, the mud was the limit."

They toned the gag down after 1941, though they kept it going often enough as the years continued, climaxing on Allen's May 26, 1946 show, in which a sketch called "King for a Day," satirizing big-money game shows, featured Benny pretending to be a contestant named Myron Proudfoot on Allen's new quiz show.

ALLEN: Tomorrow night, in your ermine robe, you will be whisked by bicycle to Orange, New Jersey, where you will be the judge in a chicken-cleaning contest.

BENNY (rapturously): I'm King for a Day!

[Allen proceeds to have Benny's clothes pressed:]

ALLEN: And that's not all!

BENNY: There's more?

ALLEN: Yes! Upon our stage we have a Hoffman pressing machine.

BENNY (cautiously): Now wait a minute. Wait a minute.

ALLEN: An expert operating the Hoffman pressing machine will press your trousers in seconds.

BENNY: Now wait a minute! (total audience hysteria and laughter, as Benny's pants are literally removed)

ALLEN: Quiet, King!

BENNY: Come on, Allen, gimme my pants!

ALLEN: Keep your shirt on, King.

BENNY: You bet I'll keep my shirt on!

ALLEN: We're a little late, folks! Tune in next week –

BENNY: Allen, this is a frame... (starts laughing himself) Where are my pants?

ALLEN: Benny, for 15 years I've been waiting to catch you like this!

BENNY: Allen, you haven't seen the end of me!

ALLEN: It won't be long now!

BENNY: I want my pants!

Allen and Benny could not resist one more play on the feud on Allen's final show. Benny appeared as a skinflint bank manager and mortgage company owner bedeviling Henry Morgan. Typically, Allen handed Benny the show's best crack: "Nobody ever made me this cheap on my own program!"

Benny even used the feud on his TV show, when Fred Allen appeared as a special guest in 1953. The program depicted Benny and Allen as rivals for the sponsor's favors. When the sponsor pointed out that Benny was also a musician, Allen countered with a passage on his clarinet. Benny felt that the script just came to a stop, without a punchline, and on the day of the filming he called an old friend to come to the studio immediately. When the cameras rolled, Benny and Allen left the stage, leaving the sponsor alone. Benny's friend -- Eddie Cantor—stepped out of a closet and exclaimed, "I thought they'd never leave!"

Benny was profoundly shaken by Allen's sudden death from a heart attack in 1956. In a statement released the day after Allen's death, Benny said, "People have often asked me if Fred Allen and I were really friends in real life. My answer is always the same. You couldn't have such a long-running and successful feud as we did, without having a deep and sincere friendship at the heart of it."

=== Censorship ===
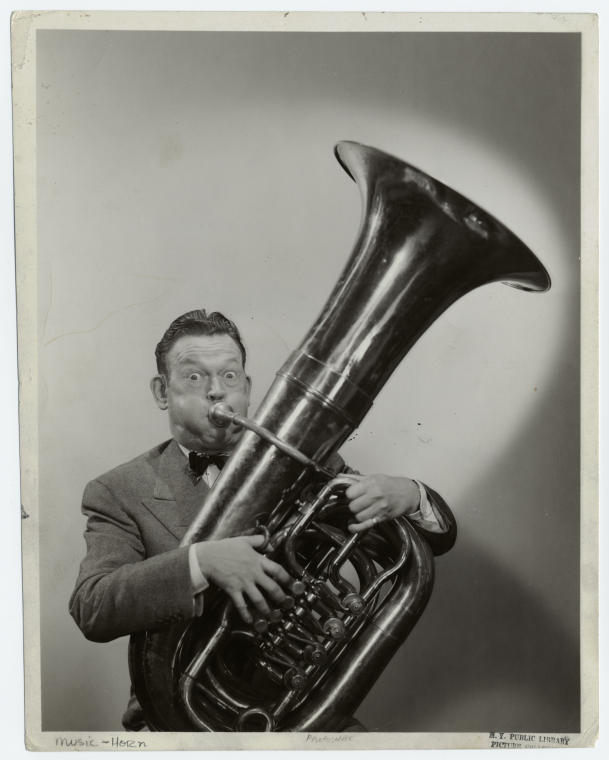
Allen playing the tuba, date unknown.

Allen may have battled censors more than most of his radio contemporaries. "Fred Allen's fourteen-year battle with radio censorship," wrote the New York Herald-Tribune critic John Crosby, "was made particularly difficult for him by the fact that the man assigned to reviewing his scripts had little sense of humor and frankly admitted he didn't understand Allen's peculiar brand of humor at all." Among the blue pencils, according to Crosby, were:

- At the time of socialite Brenda Frazier's wedding, Allen was barred from saying "Brenda never looked lovelier" unless he could get direct permission from the Frazier family.
- Allen was ordered to change the Cockney accent that he assigned the character of a first mate aboard the Queen Mary on the grounds that the ship's first mate had to be a cultured man, who might not like a Cockney accent.
- Allen had to fight to keep Mrs. Nussbaum in the Allen's Alley routines because NBC feared Jewish-dialect humor "might offend all Jews" although Jewish dialect humor had been a vaudeville and burlesque staple for years.
- Allen was ordered never to mention the fictitious town of North Wrinkle unless it could be proven that no such town existed.

"Allen not only couldn't poke fun at individuals," Crosby wrote. "He also had to be careful not to step on their professions, their beliefs, and sometimes even their hobbies and amusements. Portland Hoffa was once given a line about wasting an afternoon at the rodeo. NBC objected to the implication that an afternoon at the rodeo was wasted and the line had to be changed. Another time, Allen gagged that a girl could have found a better husband in a cemetery. The censor thought this might hurt the feelings of people who own and operate cemeteries. Allen got the line cleared only after pointing out that cemeteries have been topics for comedy since the time of Aristophanes." Allen's constant and sometimes intense, as well as often ridiculous, battles with censors may have aggravated his longtime problems with hypertension.

=== Life after the Alley ===
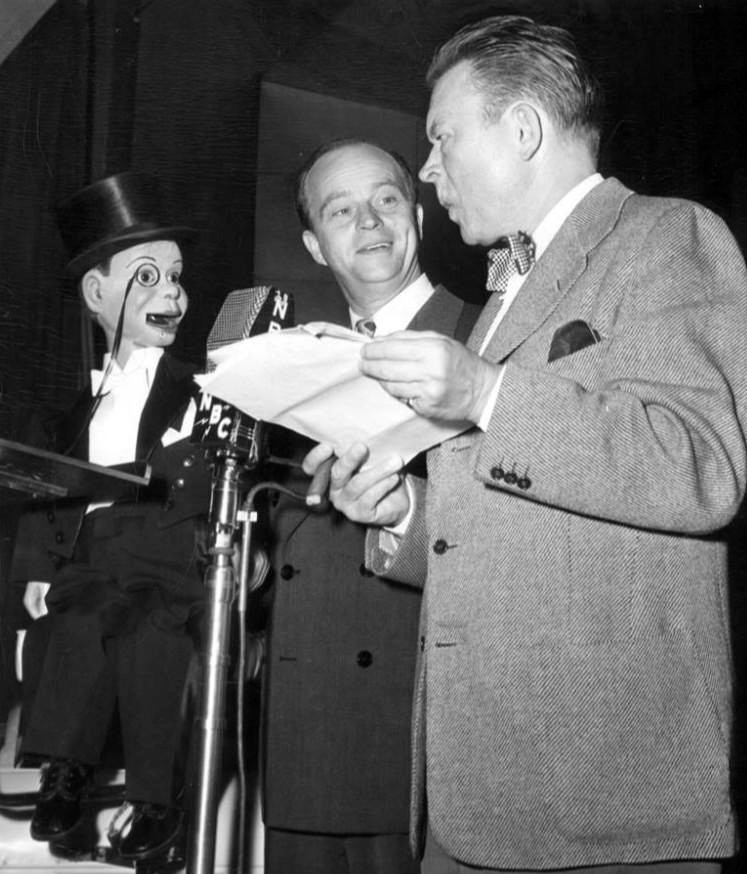
Charlie McCarthy, Edgar Bergen and Allen, 1946

After his own show had ended, Allen became a regular attraction on NBC's The Big Show (1950–1952), hosted by Tallulah Bankhead. He appeared on 24 of the show's 57 installments, including the landmark premiere, and showed he had not lost his trademark ad-lib skill or his rapier wit. The show's head writer, Goodman Ace, later told radio host Richard Lamparski that Allen's lucrative NBC contract was a large factor in getting him on the show, but Allen also wrote the segments on which he appeared and consulted with the respected Ace and staff on other portions of the show.

In some ways, The Big Show was an offspring of the old Allen show; his one-time Texaco Star Theater announcer, Jimmy Wallington, was one of The Big Show's announcers, and Hoffa made several appearances with him as well. On the show's premiere, Allen, with a little prodding from head writer Goodman Ace, could not resist one more play on the old Allen-Benny "feud," a riotous parody of Benny's show called "The Pinch Penny Program."

== Television ==
It was also on The Big Show's premiere that Allen delivered perhaps his best-remembered crack about television: "Well you know television's a new medium. And I have discovered why they call it a medium – because nothing is well done." That did not stop the Museum of Broadcast Communications from considering Allen "the intellectual conscience of television." Aside from his famous crack about not liking furniture that talked, Allen observed that television allowed "people who haven't anything to do to watch people who can't do anything."

NBC insisted on Allen trying to adapt his radio show for television. He proposed bringing "Allen's Alley" to television in a visual setting similar to Our Town. NBC apparently rejected the idea out of hand. "Television is a triumph of equipment over people," Allen later observed, "and the minds that control it are so small that you could put them in the navel of a flea and still have enough room beside them for a network vice president's heart."

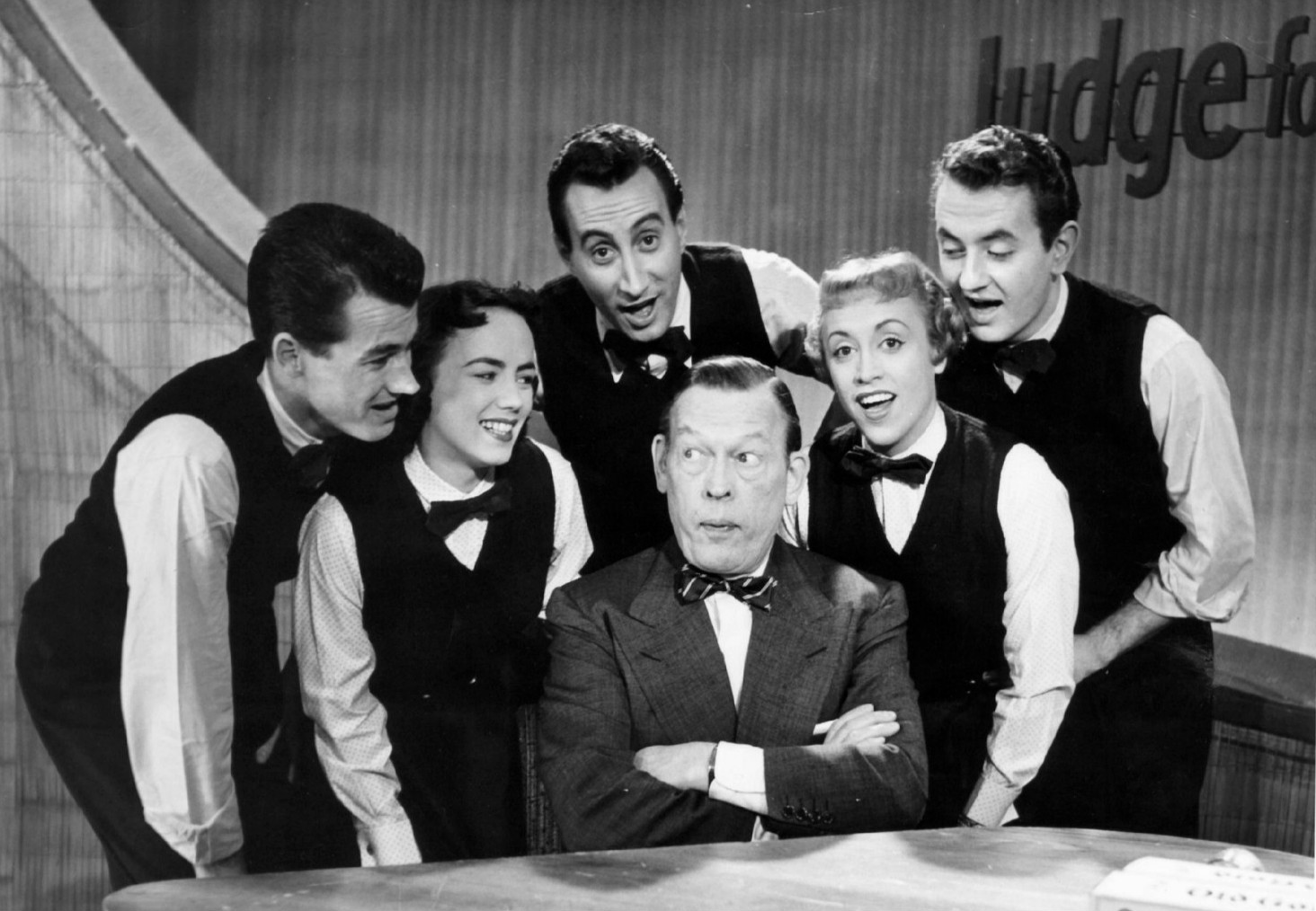
Allen surrounded by the Skylarks on Judge for Yourself in 1954

In 1950, NBC launched the live comedy-variety series The Colgate Comedy Hour by using rotating hosts instead of a regular master of ceremonies. Fred Allen was one of the original hosts and appeared five times before he dropped out in April 1951. The next effort, the Goodson-Todman production Judge for Yourself (subtitled The Fred Allen Show), was a game show incorporating musical acts. The idea was to allow Allen to ad-lib with guests (as did Groucho Marx on his own game show You Bet Your Life), but as author Alan Havig wrote, Allen was "lost in the confusion of a half hour filled with too many people and too much activity." The complicated format had to be revamped in the middle of the run. The revised premise had Allen interviewing three panelists, who would listen to three new popular songs and vote for the one that they thought had the most potential. Then came a comedy series, Fred Allen's Sketchbook, which did not catch on.

Allen credited Goodson and Todman for "keeping me alive" in show business. He landed a two-year stint as a panelist on the CBS quiz show What's My Line? from 1954 to his death on March 17, 1956. In July 1955 he took a week off from the show to have an emergency appendectomy. Allen's seat on the panel was taken by radio and TV humorist Robert Q. Lewis. The following week, Allen returned to the program, as the mystery guest. After the blindfolded panelists asked several questions, Lewis smiled and said, "I know who it is. Thank you for letting me work tonight!" Allen joked about the operation: "It was an emergency. The doctor needed some money hurriedly."

Allen also spent his final years as a newspaper columnist/humorist and as a memoirist and rented a small New York office to work six hours a day without distractions. He wrote Treadmill to Oblivion (1954, reviewing his radio and television years) and Much Ado About Me (1956, covering his childhood and his vaudeville and Broadway years, and detailing especially vaudeville at its height with surprising objectivity); the former, which included many of his vintage radio scripts, was the best-selling book on radio's classic period for many years. After the frustrations and failures of his attempts to succeed on television, the popularity of Treadmill revealed Allen's potential as a literary humorist.

== Death ==
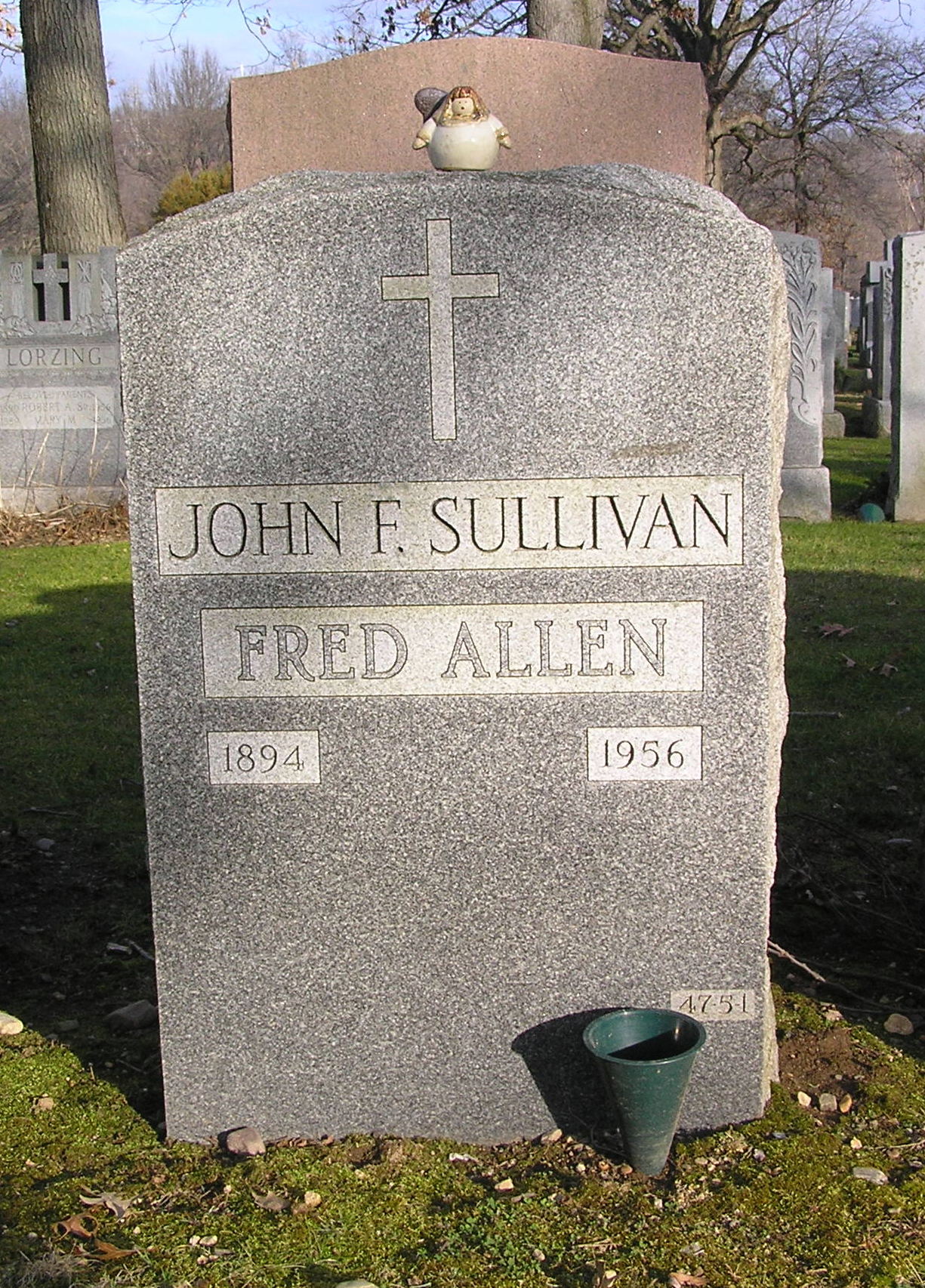
The headstone of Fred Allen in Gate of Heaven Cemetery

While taking one of his regular late-night strolls on New York's West 57th Street on Saturday night, March 17, 1956, Allen suffered a heart attack and died at the age of 61. A popular myth repeated for many years, first published a The New York Times story appearing the day after Allen's death, was that Allen had died while walking his dog. That myth was false: Biographer Robert Taylor later revealed that Allen had never owned a dog. Allen died before he could complete the final chapter of his memoirs, and as a result the book was published as he had left it. He was a tireless letter writer, though he kept few copies of those he sent. In 1963 The New York Times announced that Allen's wife Portland Hoffa and newspaper columnist Joe McCarthy were gathering Allen's letters for publication. "Fred Allen's Letters," edited by McCarthy, was published by Doubleday in 1965.

During the following night's regular Sunday broadcast of What's My Line? at 10:30 p.m., barely 24 hours following Allen's death, host John Daly preceded the program with a special message to the viewing audience. He stated that earlier in the day, the producers had considered replacing the regular game play with a special memorial episode, but Allen's wife stated that she preferred the show be conducted as it always had been, indicating that it was what Allen would have wanted. The program then proceeded as normal, but with a noticeably subdued tone. Steve Allen (no relation) took Allen's place on the panel. During the final 90 seconds of the program Steve Allen, Arlene Francis and Bennett Cerf all delivered brief but heartfelt tributes. A somber Dorothy Kilgallen thanked Steve Allen for helping them through a difficult time. A similar on-air farewell would be given on the program following the unexpected death of Kilgallen in November, 1965.

Allen has two stars on the Hollywood Walk of Fame: a radio star at 6713 Hollywood Boulevard and a television star at 7001 Hollywood Boulevard. Allen was inducted into the National Radio Hall of Fame in 1988. A pedestrian passageway in the Boston Theater District called Allen's Alley also honors his memory.

Hoffa married bandleader Joe Rines in 1959 and celebrated a second silver wedding anniversary well before her own death of natural causes in Los Angeles on Christmas Day, 1990. Allen and Hoffa are buried alongside each other in section 47 at Gate of Heaven Cemetery in Hawthorne, New York. Both Allen's real and stage names are engraved on the headstone.

== Cultural legacy ==
Several late-1930s Warner Bros. Merrie Melodies cartoon shorts feature parodies of Allen. Friz Freleng's Toy Town Hall (1936) is a spoof of Allen's Town Hall Tonight, with toys that come to life in a boy's dreams and put on a variety show. Frank Tashlin's The Woods Are Full of Cuckoos (1937) features a Fred Allen fox screaming, "Why doesn't somebody tell me these things!" and hinted about his heated feuds with censors, who were often forcing last-minute script changes on his show because of its content. Also, Tex Avery's Thugs with Dirty Mugs (1938) features the main character addressing the audience and showing them his Fred Allen impersonation in one scene.

In Action Comics #50 (July 1942), Superman quips, "Fred Allen would get a kick out of this!" as he hops on to the side of a moving train. (In 1940, Superman co-creator Jerry Siegel had been the subject of a humorous interview on the Fred Allen Show.)

== Bibliography ==
- Allen, Fred. Much Ado About Me (Boston: Little, Brown, 1956).
- Allen, Fred. Treadmill to Oblivion (Boston: Little, Brown, 1954).
- Allen, Fred, ed. by Joe McCarthy, Fred Allen's Letters (New York: Doubleday, 1965)
- Allen, Fred, ed. by Stuart Hample, all the sincerity in hollywood... (New York: Fulcrum Publishing, 2001). (The lower-case of the title was a tribute to Allen's habit, later in his life, of typing his letters in all-lower case, à la poet E. E. Cummings.)
- Smith, H. Allen, introduction by Fred Allen. Low Man on a Totem Pole, Doubleday, Doran, 1941.

== See also ==
- Colgate Comedy Hour (Fred Allen episodes)

== Sources ==
- Jack Benny and Joan Benny, Sunday Nights at Seven: The Jack Benny Story. (New York: Warner Books, 1990).
- Frank Buxton and Bill Owen, The Big Broadcast: 1920-1950 (New York: Flare Books/Avon, 1972).
- John Crosby, Out of the Blue: A Book About Radio and Television (New York: Simon and Schuster, 1952).
- Alan Havig, Fred Allen's Radio Comedy (Philadelphia: Temple University Press, 1989).
- Ben Schwartz, "The Man Who Invented Jack Benny" ('Written By', Writers Guild of America, 2002)
- Robert Taylor, Fred Allen: His Life and Wit (Boston: Little, Brown, 1989).
- John Dunning, On the Air: The Encyclopedia of Old-Time Radio. (New York: Oxford University Press, 1998).
- Hilmes, M. (1997). Radio voices American broadcasting, 1922–1952. Minnesota Minneapolis: University of Minnesota Press.
