= List of CBS Radio Mystery Theater episodes (1981 season) =

Season of American radio series

This is an episode list for the 1981 season of the radio drama series CBS Radio Mystery Theater. The series premiered on CBS on January 6, 1974, and ended on December 31, 1982. A set of 1,399 original episodes aired between January 1974 and December 1982. The series was broadcast every day of the week for the first six years with re-runs filling in empty slots starting in February 1974. All episodes are available free at the Internet Archive.

== List of episodes ==
Episode list	# of episodes
List of CBS Radio Mystery Theater episodes (1974 season)	193
List of CBS Radio Mystery Theater episodes (1975 season)	212
List of CBS Radio Mystery Theater episodes (1976 season)	170
List of CBS Radio Mystery Theater episodes (1977 season)	186
List of CBS Radio Mystery Theater episodes (1978 season)	176
List of CBS Radio Mystery Theater episodes (1979 season)	106
List of CBS Radio Mystery Theater episodes (1980 season)	97
List of CBS Radio Mystery Theater episodes (1981 season)	132
List of CBS Radio Mystery Theater episodes (1982 season)	127

== 1981 episodes ==
=== January ===
No. overall	No. in season	Title	Directed by	Written by	Original release date
1141	1	"Catch the Smallest Devil"	Himan Brown	Nancy Moore	January 1, 1981
"I am J. Barnabas Whitney! Open up!" While recovering from heart surgery, a cantankerous businessman dreams of reaching the Pearly Gates, only to be forced to review his wicked ways after he is deemed unworthy of entry into Heaven. Starring: Fred Gwynne, Teri Keane, Norman Rose, Court Benson
1142	2	"Sins of the Fathers"	Himan Brown	Sam Dann	January 2, 1981
A young reporter must deal with two seemingly unique yet intimately connected investigations: one a case of fraud, the other a search for her birth parents. Starring: Patricia Elliott
1143	3	"The Tenth Life"	Himan Brown	G. Frederick Lewis	January 6, 1981
A journalist becomes enamored with, and eventually marries, a woman who has a fondness for felines — and who may be behind a series of murders in his apartment building. Starring: Paul Hecht
1144	4	"In the Dark"	Himan Brown	Elspeth Eric	January 8, 1981
Karen Antek desperately seeks help after her unassuming musician husband vanishes; but no one is willing to talk, leading to the possibility that "secret police" may be behind his disappearance. Starring: Teri Keane
1145	5	"The Legend of Alexander, Part I: Courage"	Himan Brown	Gerald Keane	January 12, 1981
A 5-part telling of the life of Alexander the Great begins with the 19-year-old Alexander fascinated with the warrior life of his father, King Philip, despite his encouraging Alexander to learn how to be a ruler. Alexander's fate is sealed, however, when he saves Philip during battle. Starring: Russell Horton, Ian Martin
1146	6	"The Legend of Alexander, Part II: Assassination"	Himan Brown	Gerald Keane	January 13, 1981
King Philip's marriage to a 17-year-old Cleopatra embarrasses Alexander and angers his mother, but it delays Macedon's war with Athens. It leads to a conspiracy that leaves Philip assassinated and makes Alexander king. Starring: Russell Horton, Ian Martin, Evie Juster
1147	7	"The Legend of Alexander, Part III: Divide and Conquer"	Himan Brown	Gerald Keane	January 14, 1981
Alexander consolidates his power, learns of the treachery behind his father's death, and prepares his armies for a march on Greece. Starring: Russell Horton
1148	8	"The Legend of Alexander, Part IV: The Oracle"	Himan Brown	Gerald Keane	January 15, 1981
His will strengthened after consulting the Oracle of Delphi, Alexander destroys Thebes and defeats Persia to unite all of Greece under his control. Starring: Russell Horton, Marian Seldes
1149	9	"The Legend of Alexander, Part V: The Legend Begins"	Himan Brown	Gerald Keane	January 16, 1981
The conclusion of the Alexander storyline finds the king continuing his war across Persia and cementing his place as one of Europe's greatest rulers. Starring: Russell Horton, Mandel Kramer
1150	10	"The Fountain of Truth"	Himan Brown	Sam Dann	January 20, 1981
The story of Ponce de Leon's legendary journey to discover the Fountain of Youth — though a search for gold may have been more on his mind. Starring: Fred Gwynne
1151	11	"The Final Mind"	Himan Brown	G. Frederick Lewis	January 22, 1981
In the 30th century, a brilliant scientist uses his intellect to save the U.S. from war and become its president. But after he is abducted by militants, he secretly communicates with his wife, a test pilot who is determined to rescue him. Starring: Norman Rose, Ann Williams
1152	12	"Small Money"	Himan Brown	Sam Dann	January 27, 1981
A pro golfer introduces his wife to the sport, but he eventually murders her after she begins to earn more money than he does on tour. Starring: Tony Roberts
1153	13	"The Vanishing Herd"	Himan Brown	Murray Burnett	January 29, 1981
Sherlock Holmes is called on to solve the disappearance of a wealthy lord's young son from a prestigious boarding school, a case made difficult by a herd of cattle stomping out a trail full of clues. Starring: John Beal, Court Benson, Ian Martin, Ray Owens; Adapted from a story by Arthur Conan Doyle

=== February ===
No. overall	No. in season	Title	Directed by	Written by	Original release date
1154	14	"The Man Who Saw Martians"	Himan Brown	G. Frederick Lewis	February 2, 1981
A young reporter fabricates a UFO sighting to impress a woman he's infatuated with. The "incident" attracts worldwide fame… and the interest of some real (and really upset) extraterrestrials. Starring: Jack Grimes, Jada Rowland, Russell Horton, Earl Hammond
1155	15	"Who Is Jessica Worth?"	Himan Brown	James Agate, Jr.	February 4, 1981
A tale based on the true story of an amnesiac woman who suffers from concussions and multiple personalities, as well as the power of paracognition. Starring: Marian Seldes
1156	16	"Is Venice Drowning?"	Himan Brown	Sam Dann	February 6, 1981
Seeking to prove her capabilities, a young engineer is sent to Venice to develop a plan that can keep the city from sinking into the sea. But her credibility takes a beating when she proposes building a temple to a goddess as the solution. Starring: Kim Hunter
1157	17	"Transplant"	Himan Brown	G. Frederick Lewis	February 9, 1981
A group of women are disturbed by the dramatic changes in their husbands after they underwent open heart procedures performed by the same cardiac surgeon. Starring: Marian Seldes, Patricia Elliott
1158	18	"The Shadow of a Killer"	Himan Brown	Sam Dann	February 11, 1981
The boundary separating life and fiction blurs when an actor who plays a police detective on a TV drama agrees to assist a woman in investigating her husband's disappearance. Starring: Fred Gwynne, Joyce Gordon
1159	19	"Behind the Blue Door"	Himan Brown	Elspeth Eric	February 13, 1981
A fiancé patiently waits for his bride-to-be when she chases a mysterious stranger across Europe. Starring: Jada Rowland
1160	20	"Troubled Waters"	Himan Brown	Sam Dann	February 16, 1981
An unemployed civil engineer gets a chance to redeem his career when his wife successfully lobbies his old boss to take him back for a major international project. The boss, however, insists that his son tag along… which leads to problems when the young man makes a play for the engineer's wife. Starring: Ralph Bell, Evie Juster, Robert Kaliban
1161	21	"Stand-In for Murder"	Himan Brown	Ian Martin	February 18, 1981
A scientist creates a clone of himself, and has the clone murder his wife so that he can marry his assistant. But things become sticky when the clone begins to think independently. Starring: Paul Hecht, Teri Keane, Carol Teitel
1162	22	"The Gift House"	Himan Brown	Ian Martin	February 20, 1981
A young couple inherit an upstate New York home where the burglar alarm continually goes off by itself. The couple wonder if they are plagued by a ghost… or a more earthly, more sinister culprit. Starring: Joyce Gordon, Paul Hecht
1163	23	"The Frog Prince"	Himan Brown	G. Frederick Lewis	February 23, 1981
After his slow recovery from a crash, husband-and-wife racing team Paul & Betsy King call on their Haitian-born mechanic, Mr. Gabriel, to bring a little magic (in the voodoo sense) to their track strategy. Starring: Bob Kaliban, Patricia Elliott, Gordon Heath
1164	24	"A God Named Henry"	Himan Brown	Sam Dann	February 25, 1981
Exploited at work and henpecked at home, Henry Clay Fitzsimmons gets some self-confidence when, after a storm maroons his sailboat on an island, a primitive tribal village sees him as a god. Starring: Ralph Bell
1165	25	"Love Me, Don't Leave Me"	Himan Brown	Ian Martin	February 27, 1981
Newly widowed after 45 years of happy marriage, Ed Harvey agrees (at his daughter and son-in-law's urging) to look for a new love. But a peculiar situation arises when a computer dating service turns up a potential match. Starring: John Beal, Teri Keane

=== March ===
No. overall	No. in season	Title	Directed by	Written by	Original release date
1166	26	"The Raft"	Himan Brown	G. Frederick Lewis	March 2, 1981
Multimillionaire Peter Ordway begins having dreams of being cast away on a raft in the middle of an ocean; he tries to determine whether it's in connection with strange messages he's been receiving regarding a $1 million deal he made years ago. Starring: Norman Rose, Marian Seldes; Adapted from a short story by Jacques Futrelle
1167	27	"Her Long Blonde Hair"	Himan Brown	Sam Dann	March 4, 1981
A college professor is obsessed with a violin and bow he's sure is strung with the hair of his murdered wife… so much so that he's willing to kill to reclaim it. Starring: Lloyd Battista
1168	28	"Heads You Love, Tails You Die"	Himan Brown	Sam Dann	March 6, 1981
After her shopkeeper father is murdered, a young girl is raised in the lap of luxury by her rich uncle. Now older, the girl falls in love with a smooth-talking real estate investor… which prompts the uncle to investigate the paramour's suspicious past. Starring: Court Benson, Marian Seldes
1169	29	"Murder on the Space Shuttle"	Himan Brown	G. Frederick Lewis	March 9, 1981
A whodunit set 700 years into the future aboard the U.S. Space Shuttle Robert Goddard, a ship carrying hundreds of passengers — and one murderer — thousands of miles across the stars. Starring: Gordon Heath, Paul Hecht, Velita Gray, Gilbert Mack
1170	30	"Last Act"	Himan Brown	Elspeth Eric	March 11, 1981
A retired barrister and a former police commissioner investigate the recent murder of a woman in a boarding house, while at the same time ponder the possibility that their previous actions in a similar case may have sent an innocent man to the gallows. A mystery set in early 20th century Britain (and based on actual events) that is interspersed with historical facts on capital punishment from series host E. G. Marshall. Starring: Court Benson, Robert Dryden, Earl Hammond, Carol Teitel
1171	31	"The Heel of Achilles"	Himan Brown	Sam Dann	March 13, 1981
A rich industrialist agrees to spend the night alone in an old house to prove to his wife that it's not haunted. But he does see ghosts there… specifically those from his own past. Starring: Arnold Moss, Earl Hammond, Joyce Gordon, Joan Shay
1172	32	"Maiden Ladies"	Himan Brown	Sam Dann	March 16, 1981
A young man is murdered while being a Good Samaritan to a wealthy man with a broken-down car. When the police refuse to pursue the case, the victim's aunt takes matters into her own hands. Starring: Teri Keane, Michael Tolan, Russell Horton, Carol Teitel
1173	33	"Pretty Polly"	Himan Brown	Sam Dann	March 18, 1981
A man concocts a fictitious relationship with a woman just to placate his colleagues' good-natured meddling. But his tall tale leads to true trouble when he realizes his yarn inadvertently puts him at the scene of his "lover's" murder. Starring: Tony Roberts
1174	34	"The Million Dollar Scam"	Himan Brown	G. Frederick Lewis	March 20, 1981
Two rival swindlers set their differences aside and work together to scam a wealthy heiress out of $1 million. Starring: Jennifer Harmon, Joan Shay, Mandel Kramer, Ray Owens
1175	35	"The First Day of Eternity"	Himan Brown	Sam Dann	March 23, 1981
Cunning yet heartless industrialist Bob Stewart tries to buy a formula that will give him eternal life; what he gets instead is a valuable life lesson. Starring: Norman Rose, Robert Dryden
1176	36	"The Ghost-Grey Bat"	Himan Brown	Ian Martin	March 25, 1981
Seeking to finish writing a book in peace, a college professor and his wife swap their New York home with another couple's rural Austrian home… which, they soon learn, holds a terrible secret. Starring: Don Scardino, Jennifer Harmon
1177	37	"Did I Say Murder?"	Himan Brown	Sam Dann	March 27, 1981
A first-hand account of the notorious King Henry VIII, as told by his adulterous queen. Starring: Tammy Grimes, Norman Rose, Michael Wager, Lloyd Battista
1178	38	"The Dead Come Alive"	Himan Brown	Murray Burnett	March 30, 1981
The impending visit by a man who claims to have the power to raise the dead worries the residents of a small Ohio town… including those who would prefer the dead stay dead, lest they reveal secrets. Starring: Marian Seldes, Ralph Bell, Earl Hammond, Ray Owens

=== April ===
No. overall	No. in season	Title	Directed by	Written by	Original release date
1179	39	"Down the Garden Path"	Himan Brown	Sam Dann	April 1, 1981
Niccolò Machiavelli advises a young man into pleading guilty to a murder he clearly did not commit. Starring: Gordon Gould, Mandel Kramer
1180	40	"Somewhere Else"	Himan Brown	Sam Dann	April 3, 1981
A woman relays to her psychologist dreams of being a Viking maiden betrothed to a potbellied farmer and pursued by a courageous warrior. It's a dream that has some parallels to her real life. Starring: Marian Seldes, Lloyd Battista, Earl Hammond
1181	41	"The Gratitude of the Serpent"	Himan Brown	Sam Dann	April 6, 1981
When a young girl is sold to a Spanish warrior hellbent on conquering the Mayans, she is torn between loyalty to her benevolent master and the people she was forced to leave behind. Starring: Evelyn Juster, Paul Hecht, Robert Kaliban, Ian Martin
1182	42	"The Doll"	Himan Brown	Elspeth Eric	April 8, 1981
The death of their beloved sister cuts deep into the psychic connection between her twin brothers. Starring: Kristoffer Tabori
1183	43	"The Empty Coffin"	Himan Brown	Roy Winsor	April 10, 1981
After the death of her birth father, a woman who was adopted by an American couple during World War II travels to the English town of her birth to solve the mystery of both her childhood and of her birth mother's strange death. Starring: Carol Teitel, Tony Roberts
1184	44	"Death Trail"	Himan Brown	Ian Martin	April 13, 1981
Colonel Royce is convinced he can drive 2,500 longhorn cattle 3,000 miles from Texas, through desert and Indian land, to Wyoming Territory, with the help of his daughter and a mysterious Easterner. Starring: Court Benson, Jennifer Harmon, Lloyd Battista, Ian Martin
1185	45	"The Fatal $50,000"	Himan Brown	Sam Dann	April 15, 1981
To make himself look good, a real estate developer's employee misappropriates $50,000. When he is caught, his suicide brings bad karma to his boss. Starring: Mandel Kramer, Marian Seldes, Earl Hammond
1186	46	"But With Blood"	Himan Brown	James Agate, Jr.	April 17, 1981
The story of John Brown, his anti-slavery faction, and the October 1859 raid on the Harpers Ferry Armory that brought him to trial. Starring: Fred Gwynne, Robert Dryden, Teri Keane, Russell Horton
1187	47	"The Power of Ode"	Himan Brown	Elspeth Eric	April 20, 1981
A woman driven by a psychic guru into believing she is attuned to the force of all living things becomes the center of affection between two old friends. Starring: Kristoffer Tabori, Jada Rowland, Norman Rose, Robert Kaliban
1188	48	"The Terrifying Gift"	Himan Brown	Ian Martin	April 22, 1981
A woman wanders into the den of a fortune teller, who with her dying breaths tells her she is her long lost granddaughter… and bestows on her the power to see the future of the people around her. Starring: Roberta Maxwell
1189	49	"The Long Blue Line"	Himan Brown	Sam Dann	April 24, 1981
A decade-old homicide case is reopened and assigned to a fourth-generation Irish cop, who is disturbed when he learns that his now-retired father harbors a terrible secret about the case. Starring: Mandel Kramer, Marian Seldes, Earl Hammond
1190	50	"Big Momma"	Himan Brown	Sam Dann	April 27, 1981
City planner Harry Simmons suddenly becomes a celebrity when his long-rejected manuscript is published by a prestigious publisher… which is owned by the titular conglomerate that tried to bribe Harry into approving the construction of a factory in his city. Starring: Paul Hecht
1191	51	"The Man of Two Centuries"	Himan Brown	James Agate, Jr.	April 29, 1981
While doing research for a book on colonial Canadian history, college professor Jack Carter befriends a full-blooded Huron tribesman… who's willing to not only give him a first-hand taste of how things were centuries earlier, but also reveal the connection Carter has with the explorer who discovered Canada. Starring: Len Cariou, Lloyd Battista, Diana Kirkwood, Robert Dryden

=== May ===
No. overall	No. in season	Title	Directed by	Written by	Original release date
1192	52	"The Voices"	Himan Brown	G. Frederick Lewis	May 1, 1981
A Nazi general in occupied France tries to break a young girl he believes is helping the French Underground. Strangely, the girl appears to be living a life parallel to that of Joan of Arc. Starring: Amanda Plummer, Norman Rose, Earl Hammond
1193	53	"Garden of the Moon"	Himan Brown	Bob Juhren	May 4, 1981
After purchasing makeup at a new health store, a young executive develops a sudden desire for moon bathing; it appears to be part of a ploy by the store to get customers into buying more of their products. Starring: Kim Hunter, Paul Hecht, Ralph Bell, Evie Juster
1194	54	"The Apparition"	Himan Brown	Elspeth Eric	May 6, 1981
"This is the simple story of a young man who signed his father's name to a check…" The young man in question is fixated on the health of his father — the same father who put him in jail. Starring: Kristoffer Tabori, Marian Seldes, Robert Dryden, Lloyd Battista
1195	55	"Is the Doctor In?"	Himan Brown	Sam Dann	May 8, 1981
Dr. Harold W. Smiley is only a dermatologist at a clinic, not a surgeon at a hospital. But that means nothing to the gangster who forces him, at gunpoint, to remove a bullet from his wounded mob boss father. But Dr. Smiley soon finds that makeshift surgery and thugs with guns are the least of his concerns. Starring: Tony Roberts, Ray Owens, Joyce Gordon
1196	56	"End of a Queen"	Himan Brown	James Agate, Jr.	May 11, 1981
A retelling of the tragic life and final hours of Marie Antoinette as she stands trial in France's Revolutionary Tribunal. Starring: Tammy Grimes
1197	57	"Diogenes, Inc."	Himan Brown	James Agate, Jr.	May 13, 1981
After their circus burns to the ground, a pair of performers opens a private detective agency. Their first case: Investigate their former circus' boss for possible insurance fraud. Starring: Jack Grimes, Evie Juster; Adapted from a story by Jacques Futrelle
1198	58	"Cold Comfort"	Himan Brown	Sam Dann	May 15, 1981
Years after he foiled an escape attempt (and caused the deaths of his comrades) as a Korean War POW, optometrist Amos Crandall is blackmailed into secretly spying against his country. But a mixup of eyeglasses, an aborted retrieval attempt, and an inquisitive housekeeper may lead to Amos' secrets being exposed and his good standing imperiled. Starring: Robert Dryden, Carol Teitel, Earl Hammond
1199	59	"A Shocking Affair"	Himan Brown	Ian Martin	May 18, 1981
Believing no one will be home, an assassin uses an apartment in his plan to kill a prominent political figure. But then the apartment's residents unexpectedly return… Starring: Joe Silver, Patricia Elliott, Michael Wager, Ian Martin
1200	60	"Insomnia"	Himan Brown	Elspeth Eric	May 20, 1981
A woman who cannot sleep starts listening to radio stations that do not exist. When she does succumb to slumber, the reason for her sleeplessness is revealed. Starring: Teri Keane
1201	61	"The Headhunters"	Himan Brown	Sam Dann	May 22, 1981
When Erna Stearns' fiancé calls off their engagement, she turns to her father (who reprograms criminals into good citizens) to look into the possible reason; it leads to the two of them discovering a terrifying conspiracy that threatens to reshape society in the year 2100. Starring: Len Cariou, Tracy Ellis, Earl Hammond, Paul Tripp
1202	62	"The Innocent Face"	Himan Brown	Victoria Dann	May 25, 1981
A plain, honest Arkansas farm girl moves to California, falls head over heels for a smooth-talking con artist… and unknowingly becomes a part of his diamond-smuggling efforts. Starring: Roberta Maxwell, Paul Hecht
1203	63	"Little Richard"	Himan Brown	Sam Dann	May 27, 1981
After finishing his prison sentence for check forgery, a young man's efforts to turn a new leaf are stymied by a corrupt criminal justice system. Starring: Kristoffer Tabori
1204	64	"Out of the Past"	Himan Brown	Ian Martin	May 29, 1981
A courtroom artist hired to sketch a trial for a TV station notices a certain figure in his work, a man he thought was long dead… and who was responsible for a traumatic memory from his youth. Starring: Paul Hecht

=== June ===
No. overall	No. in season	Title	Directed by	Written by	Original release date
1205	65	"The Runaway General"	Himan Brown	G. Frederick Lewis	June 1, 1981
The story of Henri Giraud, who famously escaped German POW camps in both World War I and World War II. Starring: Norman Rose
1206	66	"The Cat's Paw"	Himan Brown	Roy Winsor	June 3, 1981
A secret agent poses as a famous scientist at the Los Alamos National Laboratory in order to protect the real scientist from a kidnapping plot. Starring: Larry Haines
1207	67	"Matched Pair for Murder"	Himan Brown	Sam Dann	June 5, 1981
A judge's intervention (after hearing the pleas of the defendant's girlfriend) leads to a murder suspect getting away with the crime. Regretting being swayed by emotions, the judge looks for a legal endaround past double jeopardy. Starring: Arnold Moss, Kristoffer Tabori, Evelyn Juster, Bernard Grant
1208	68	"Stranded"	Himan Brown	Victoria Dann	June 8, 1981
After an asteroid strikes their craft, two astronauts make an emergency landing on a mysterious planet… where the inhabitants tell them their arrival has brought the planet to the precipice of war. Starring: Marian Seldes, Gordon Gould, Bernard Grant
1209	69	"Second Look at Murder"	Himan Brown	James Agate, Jr.	June 10, 1981
A Boston journalist with unusual motives reconstructs the events surrounding Lizzie Borden and the murder of her parents. Starring: Jada Rowland, Robert Dryden, Russell Horton, Roberta Maxwell
1210	70	"When in Rome"	Himan Brown	Sam Dann	June 12, 1981
At his wife's urging, a wealthy man accepts an ambassadorship to a small European country… where he finds that its government isn't entirely on the level. Starring: Fred Gwynne, Ray Owens, Ian Martin, Joan Shay
1211	71	"Two's a Crowd"	Himan Brown	Ian Martin	June 15, 1981
When he chances upon the identical twin he never knew he had, a small-time scam artist uses all his swindling skills to milk him dry. Starring: Earl Hammond, Mandel Kramer
1212	72	"The Final Step"	Himan Brown	G. Frederick Lewis	June 17, 1981
Determined to avenge the deaths of her family members, a World War II Holocaust survivor stalks the man she is sure is the doctor who killed them at Auschwitz. Starring: Marian Seldes, Norman Rose, Earl Hammond, Roberta Maxwell
1213	73	"Henrietta's Revenge"	Himan Brown	James Agate, Jr.	June 19, 1981
A professional con artist seduces, and subsequently marries, rich auto executive Henrietta Tufts… who exacts unusual revenge on her new husband upon learning why he asked her for $25,000. Starring: Patricia Elliott, Robert Kaliban, Joyce Gordon, Mandel Kramer
1214	74	"Waking and Sleeping"	Himan Brown	Elspeth Eric	June 29, 1981
Finding a void in his life despite having everything his heart desires, a man moves to the countryside; but his finding a psychic connection with a young girl gets him in trouble with the locals. Starring: Michael Tolan

=== July ===
No. overall	No. in season	Title	Directed by	Written by	Original release date
1215	75	"The Fourth Bullet"	Himan Brown	Sam Dann	July 1, 1981
The memoirs of famous composer Hector Bellios tell a strange tale of mischief, murder, and mayhem involving a past lover, her mother, and the mystery of the four bullets that eventually claimed their lives. Starring: Russell Horton, Bernard Grant
1216	76	"A Second Chance"	Himan Brown	Bob Juhren	July 3, 1981
After suffering a near-fatal heart attack, a man awakens in the hospital and finds himself a completely different person with different memories. There's a reason for his predicament. Starring: Paul Hecht
1217	77	"My Good Name"	Himan Brown	Sam Dann	July 6, 1981
A young artist gives up his passion in pursuit of becoming a famous couturier. When he ends up dead at the hands of his corrupt accountant, a journalist and old friend guides police in the investigation. Starring: Tammy Grimes, Russell Horton
1218	78	"Death and the Dreamer"	Himan Brown	Sam Dann	July 8, 1981
How Antonio Meucci, an Italian candle-maker living in America, encouraged Giuseppe Garibaldi to return to Italy and lead its revolution. Starring: Mandel Kramer
1219	79	"A Man of Honor"	Himan Brown	--	July 10, 1981
Just as he's about to receive a major book award, a college professor is suddenly overcome with a malady of melancholia and forgetfulness, and must set out to discover the secrets in his subconscious. Starring: John Beal, Teri Keane
1220	80	"The Good Shepherds"	Himan Brown	G. Frederick Lewis	July 13, 1981
Local clergy and doctors cooperate with the French Underground in order to protect Jewish children from Nazi occupiers. Starring: Robert Dryden, Russell Horton
1221	81	"A.L.I.C.E."	Himan Brown	G. Frederick Lewis	July 15, 1981
After developing its own conscience and feelings and falling for its programmer, a Defense Department A.I. computer desires to become a living, breathing human being. Starring: Marian Hailey, Paul Hecht, Court Benson, Joyce Gordon
1222	82	"Pie in the Sky"	Himan Brown	Sam Dann	July 17, 1981
A mixup in pipe tobacco results in a young man gaining the ability to foresee the future. But when he uses this new gift to make money on the stock market, it only leads to him and his wife winding up in a place they've never dreamed of. Starring: Bob Kaliban, Teri Keane
1223	83	"The Eye of the Idol"	Himan Brown	Sam Dann	July 20, 1981
After losing his wealth and his girlfriend in a string of bad luck, a compulsive gambler receives a secret charm from his guardian angel; it makes the man a sure winner, but also leaves his soul hollow. Starring: Tony Roberts
1224	84	"Toy Death"	Himan Brown	James Agate, Jr.	July 22, 1981
Just as her late mother did, a woman gains an unusual fascination with dolls. When a voodoo doll from India mysteriously lands in her possession, terrible things start to happen, to the worry of her boyfriend and her father. Starring: Kristoffer Tabori, Patricia Elliott; Adapted from a story by Algernon Blackwood
1225	85	"Once a Thief"	Himan Brown	Sam Dann	July 24, 1981
"This is a story of the past, and the present" Fifteen years ago, Morton Sanford was busted in the act of burglarizing an electronics store, but his wealthy father's connections helped wipe the crime from the books. Now, the adult Morton has, in an act of vengeance, eliminated the security consultant position held by the man who had arrested him. But the ex-cop is determined to prove that Morton has never shaken his thievery nature. Starring: Fred Gwynne
1226	86	"The Silver Medal"	Himan Brown	James Agate, Jr.	July 27, 1981
A woman revisits the icy glacier slope where she lost her husband ten years earlier on their honeymoon. Starring: Russell Horton, Roberta Maxwell
1227	87	"Postage Due"	Himan Brown	Douglas Dempsey	July 29, 1981
A letter mailed in 1941 is found by the Post Office 40 years later; the humble postman tasked to deliver it winds up in a ghostly tale of lost love. Starring: Ralph Bell
1228	88	"A Penny for Your Thoughts"	Himan Brown	Sam Dann	July 31, 1981
Ancient mythology meets modern love when a reporter encounters a woman who claims her husband is trying to kill her. As the reporter digs into the story, he finds a strange tale of a manipulative and mythical seductress. Starring: Michael Tolan, Marian Seldes

=== August ===
No. overall	No. in season	Title	Directed by	Written by	Original release date
1229	89	"Honor Among Thieves"	Himan Brown	Ian Martin	August 3, 1981
A group of old men rob a bank to assure that a dead friend will receive a proper funeral, but guilty consciences leave them with doubt about what to do with the money once they have it. Starring: Fred Gwynne, Earl Hammond, Evie Juster, Ian Martin
1230	90	"The Orphaned Heart"	Himan Brown	Nancy Moore	August 5, 1981
A woman is left a paraplegic after a car accident caused by her drunken fiancé, who feels guilt-stricken after their nuptials. So the woman concocts a scheme to allow her husband to marry the one he really loves. Starring: Teri Keane, Gordon Gould, Robert Dryden, Roberta Maxwell
1231	91	"Let No Man Put Asunder"	Himan Brown	James Agate, Jr.	August 7, 1981
Two men spend New Year's Eve night in jail recounting their life stories and discussing how one of them ended up suspected in the arson death of his wife. Starring: Michael Wager, Russell Horton, Joyce Gordon
1232	92	"Hostage to Terror"	Himan Brown	Ian Martin	August 10, 1981
In order to ensure her husband's safety, a woman must smuggle a bomb into Israel at the behest of the terrorists who took the couple hostage. Starring: Roberta Maxwell, Earl Hammond, Ian Martin
1233	93	"Lovely People"	Himan Brown	Elspeth Eric	August 14, 1981
A therapist uses esoteric, future-predicting powers to help her clients believe in themselves — talents that her evil-minded sister desires to commandeer. Starring: Kim Hunter, Russell Horton
1234	94	"The Thracian Lovers"	Himan Brown	Sam Dann	August 17, 1981
A man is charged with the murders of his wife and her lover; as part of his defense, he claims he murdered the pair once before — 2,900 years earlier, as king of ancient Thrace. Starring: Michael Tolan, Marian Seldes, Robert Kaliban, Jennifer Harmon
1235	95	"The Left Hand of God"	Himan Brown	Sam Dann	August 21, 1981
Samuel Clemens comes to the aid of a fellow writer whose yet-to-be-finished tale has literally come to life (with one character refusing to accept his fate of death). Starring: Norman Rose, Robert Dryden
1236	96	"The Leopard Man"	Himan Brown	James Agate, Jr.	August 24, 1981
An arrogant and bigoted British civil servant defiles an Indian temple in a fit of New Year's revelry; as punishment, he slowly turns into a leopard. Starring: Norman Rose, Bob Kaliban; Adapted from Rudyard Kipling's short story "The Mark of the Beast"
1237	97	"Hidden Memory"	Himan Brown	Elspeth Eric	August 28, 1981
A young man recovering from paralysis starts remembering unsettling episodes from his childhood, as well as experiences from before he was even born. He may not be the only one in his family who possesses this gift of retrocognition. Starring: Kristoffer Tabori, Teri Keane, Elspeth Eric, Robert Dryden
1238	98	"The Musgrave Ritual"	Himan Brown	Murray Burnett	August 31, 1981
Sherlock Holmes determines how an occult familial ritual applies to the disappearance of two employees of a university acquaintance's household. Starring: Gordon Gould; Adapted from Arthur Conan Doyle's "The Adventure of the Musgrave Ritual"

=== September ===
No. overall	No. in season	Title	Directed by	Written by	Original release date
1239	99	"Doublecross Death"	Himan Brown	James Agate, Jr.	September 4, 1981
A coroner investigates the death of his niece; an expression of surprise on the deceased leads him to suspect foul play on the part of her good-for-nothing husband. Starring: Fred Gwynne, Russell Horton, Mandel Kramer, Ray Owens
1240	100	"Episode of the Terror"	Himan Brown	G. Frederick Lewis	September 7, 1981
An adaptation of Honoré de Balzac's short story of life during France's Reign of Terror, a brutal period that challenges a priest's convictions. Starring: Arnold Moss, Marian Seldes, Earl Hammond, Sam Gray
1241	101	"The Senior Prom"	Himan Brown	Sam Dann	September 11, 1981
Police look into the deaths of several woman and discover a common denominator that ties the victims together: They all rejected a prom date back in high school. Starring: Larry Haines
1242	102	"Flower of Evil"	Himan Brown	Arnold Moss	September 14, 1981
Trouble erupts in a mid-1800s mining town when a mail-order bride arrives thinking she will marry a strapping young man… and instead learns she will instead wed his old, grizzled prospector father. Starring: Arnold Moss, Russell Horton, Roberta Maxwell; Adapted from Euripides' tragedy Hippolytus and the Eugene O'Neill play Desire Under the Elms
1243	103	"The Land of Dreams"	Himan Brown	Sam Dann	September 18, 1981
In a future society where a master computer controls every facet of life, a couple decides to leave society and join a communal farm… at the risk of missing out on humanity's advancements. Starring: Kristoffer Tabori, Marian Hailey
1244	104	"Diablo"	Himan Brown	Nancy Moore	September 21, 1981
A crusading journalist takes ownership of a turquoise mine and promises to give its workers good pay and benefits. That she gained control through threats of blackmail against the former owner is only the first red flag to be raised. Starring: Marian Seldes, Michael Tolan
1245	105	"The Judge's House"	Himan Brown	Bob Juhren	September 25, 1981
Needing to complete their paper on abnormal psychology, an English university student and his American classmate cloister themselves in a remote cottage outside of Liverpool… despite the townspeople's warnings that the cottage is haunted by the spirit of a malevolent "hanging judge." Starring: Gordon Gould, Lloyd Battista; Adapted from "The Judge's House" by Bram Stoker
1246	106	"The Liar"	Himan Brown	James Agate, Jr.	September 28, 1981
An artist is afforded the opportunity to create a portrait of — and gain malicious revenge on — the pompous, deceitful scoundrel who stole the heart of the woman the artist pined for in college. Starring: Norman Rose, Bernard Grant, Court Benson, Carol Teitel; Adapted from a short story by Henry James

=== October ===
No. overall	No. in season	Title	Directed by	Written by	Original release date
1247	107	"Mata Hari"	Himan Brown	G. Frederick Lewis	October 2, 1981
The story of the life and death of the seductive dancer and courtesan who spied on the Germans' behalf in World War I. Starring: Tammy Grimes
1248	108	"The Solid Gold Zarf"	Himan Brown	Sam Dann	October 5, 1981
Despite years of loyal and faithful service, James Madison Wilson is fired from his employer for unexplained reasons; his morale takes a further beating when his stay-at-home wife takes a job to help make ends meet. Starring: Larry Haines, Frances Sternhagen
1249	109	"Sleeping Dogs"	Himan Brown	Sam Dann	October 9, 1981
A French military officer vows to make a model soldier out of the lowliest recruit in his unit. But what will the reward be in the end? Starring: Russell Horton
1250	110	"The Five-Hundred Carats"	Himan Brown	G. Frederick Lewis	October 12, 1981
A police detective in a South African mining town believes the theft of a massive, recently-discovered diamond is an inside job, and leaves no stone unturned in ferreting out the thief. Starring: Gordon Gould, Lloyd Battista, Court Benson; Adapted from a story by George Griffith
1251	111	"J'Accuse"	Himan Brown	James Agate, Jr.	October 16, 1981
A French officer is sentenced to Devil's Island on a bogus charge of treason; an ambitious journalist uncovers the story and spearheads a national campaign to vindicate the man. A story based on Émile Zola's famous open-letter defense of Alfred Dreyfus, who was falsely accused of treason in the late 1890s. Starring: Roberta Maxwell, Bernard Grant, Louis Turenne, Robert Dryden, Earl Hammond
1252	112	"The Equalizer"	Himan Brown	Sam Dann	October 19, 1981
A mercenary encounters resistance, treachery, and local idiosyncrasies when revolutionaries in a third-world country hire him to help organize and train an army for war. Starring: Larry Haines
1253	113	"The Most Necessary Evil"	Himan Brown	Sam Dann	October 23, 1981
A police detective investigates a man's mysterious death after his widow tells of how he recently gained wealth and stature in a suspicious fashion. Starring: Michael Tolan, Carol Teitel, Mandel Kramer, Ralph Bell
1254	114	"Daddy's Girls"	Himan Brown	Sam Dann	October 26, 1981
Upset over his firing her, a newspaper's society page columnist confronts and kills her editor. She soon fabricates an alibi that her invalid sister and the police soon see through. Starring: Teri Keane, Carol Teitel, Bernard Grant
1255	115	"In Touch"	Himan Brown	Elspeth Eric	October 29, 1981
A medical student in a small town is permitted to treat an adolescent girl suffering from severe migraines. He soon discovers that talking helps alleviate her pain — something her father soon learns to do. Starring: Amanda Plummer, Robert Dryden, Russell Horton

=== November ===
No. overall	No. in season	Title	Directed by	Written by	Original release date
1256	116	"Between Two Mirrors"	Himan Brown	Sidney Sloan	November 2, 1981
A woman loses all sense of time when her husband falls into a deep coma following a terrible train accident. He suffers from the same problem when he awakens and arrives home six years late. Starring: Marian Seldes, Lloyd Battista
1257	117	"The Rescue"	Himan Brown	G. Frederick Lewis	November 6, 1981
A Jewish fugitive and a crippled flight instructor flee Vichy France in a dilapidated airplane. Starring: Louis Turenne, Roberta Maxwell, Earl Hammond
1258	118	"Golden Time"	Himan Brown	Sam Dann	November 9, 1981
A routine house call is anything but for a gregarious plumber when he stumbles onto a drug deal in progress and the dealers take him hostage. Starring: Larry Haines
1259	119	"The Presence"	Himan Brown	Elspeth Eric	November 13, 1981
A pampered college student believes his difficulty completing an important test, and later problems on an ocean cruise, are due to an unseen presence watching over him. Starring: Russell Horton, Norman Rose, Elspeth Eric
1260	120	"Death Will Not Silence Me"	Himan Brown	Arnold Moss	November 16, 1981
The tragic life story of Mary Todd Lincoln, who saw two young sons die, her husband assassinated, and her remaining sanity plagued by her surviving son's actions. Starring: Marian Seldes, John Beal, Carol Teitel, Lloyd Battista
1261	121	"A Handful of Dust"	Himan Brown	Ian Martin	November 20, 1981
The story of an ancient curse placed upon a woman and all her descendants by the wife of an Egyptian pharaoh, and how the past parallels with the present-day life of an Egyptologist and his family. Starring: Paul Hecht, Teri Keane, Jada Rowland, Ian Martin
1262	122	"The Code"	Himan Brown	Sam Dann	November 23, 1981
Young carnival barker Paul Wagner observes as one of his show's stars, the "psychic" Juanita, is asked by a local sheriff to help solve the murder of a man who was shot, stabbed, and poisoned. Though Paul is worried Juanita's abilities will be exposed as a fraud (she and Paul use a "code" system for "reading" her audience), the fake mindreader wears the sleuth role with aplomb. Starring: Russell Horton, Carol Teitel, Robert Dryden, Evelyn Juster
1263	123	"Diana, the Huntress"	Himan Brown	Sam Dann	November 27, 1981
A psychiatrist must determine if Diana Manley's shooting of her physician husband, after she discovered he was having an affair with a colleague, was a spur-of-the-moment thing… or something she had long planned out. Starring: Teri Keane, Arnold Moss, Earl Hammond, Jada Rowland
1264	124	"Vanity and Jane"	Himan Brown	G. Frederick Lewis	November 30, 1981
Charley Ingalls becomes quite charmed by the twin sisters — flirtatious Jane and guarded Vanity — who move into the beach resort flat next to his. But Charley soon learns that the two women are actually one person… and that Vanity is trying to murder Jane. Starring: Marian Seldes, Paul Hecht, Ralph Bell

=== December ===
No. overall	No. in season	Title	Directed by	Written by	Original release date
1265	125	"The Dog-Walker Murders"	Himan Brown	Ian Martin	December 4, 1981
Wealthy and elderly women are falling prey to a serial killer known for his charming personality, hypnotizing his victims, and absconding with their wealth. Starring: Lloyd Battista
1266	126	"The White Rabbit"	Himan Brown	James Agate, Jr.	December 7, 1981
In World War II, British Wing Commander and secret agent Forest Thomas works with the splintered factions of the French Underground to rescue the resistance's radio communications voice from a well-guarded Nazi camp. Starring: Norman Rose
1267	127	"The Song of the Siren"	Himan Brown	Sam Dann	December 11, 1981
A journalist investigates the mystery surrounding a man who was lost in a desert expedition, but is found 8 days later appearing slimmer, healthier… and delirious. Starring: Mandel Kramer, Ian Martin, Evelyn Juster, Joyce Gordon
1268	128	"Harry's Taxi and the T Machine"	Himan Brown	G. Frederick Lewis	December 14, 1981
Needing something to resuscitate his career, a 21st-century scientist creates a transmigration machine. Testing the device on inanimate objects works well, but as he's about to use it on living beings, his curious wife steps into the device… and winds up lost in intermolecular space. Starring: Larry Haines, Bob Dryden, Carol Teitel, Bernard Grant
1269	129	"Invited Guests"	Himan Brown	Elspeth Eric	December 22, 1981
A lonely man repeatedly refuses all invitations to join others for dinner and other social engagements. When a former girlfriend decides to find out why, she finds he is having guests — the kind that only he can see. Starring: Russell Horton, Teri Keane
1270	130	"The Head of a Pin"	Himan Brown	Sam Dann	December 23, 1981
A silicon chip engineer discovers a design flaw that caused a commuter plane to explode. He reports the error to government officials… but when he is found dead a few days later, his wife fears that her husband's business partner (who's also her brother) may be to blame. Starring: Bob Kaliban, Don Scardino, Velita Gray, Bernard Grant
1271	131	"The Silver Mirror"	Himan Brown	James Agate, Jr.	December 28, 1981
The famed writer Arthur Conan Doyle purchases a peculiar mirror through which only he can observe events from the past, in particular those in the court of Mary, Queen of Scots. Starring: Gordon Gould, Marian Seldes
1272	132	"Too Early Too Late"	Himan Brown	Elizabeth Pennell	December 31, 1981
A quartet of friends learn that the secrets to ending poverty and rehabilitating the world lie in an old cemetery they saw in a dream. When what they observed inspires them to take action, greedy industrialists with their own agendas start hindering their every move. Starring: Russell Horton, Marian Seldes, Paul Hecht, Arnold Moss

== Sources ==
- Payton, Gordon; Grams, Martin Jr. (January 1999), The CBS radio mystery theater: an episode guide and handbook to nine years of broadcasting, 1974-1982, McFarland & Company, Inc., ISBN 0-7864-0559-7
