= List of CBS Radio Mystery Theater episodes (1976 season) =

Season of American radio series

This is an episode list for the 1976 season of the radio drama series CBS Radio Mystery Theater. The series premiered on CBS on January 6, 1974, and ended on December 31, 1982. A set of 1,399 original episodes aired between January 1974 and December 1982. The series was broadcast every day of the week for the first six years with re-runs filling in empty slots starting in February 1974. All episodes are available free at the Internet Archive.

== List of seasons ==
| Episode list | # of episodes |
|---|---|
| List of CBS Radio Mystery Theater episodes (1974 season) | 193 |
| List of CBS Radio Mystery Theater episodes (1975 season) | 212 |
| List of CBS Radio Mystery Theater episodes (1976 season) | 170 |
| List of CBS Radio Mystery Theater episodes (1977 season) | 186 |
| List of CBS Radio Mystery Theater episodes (1978 season) | 176 |
| List of CBS Radio Mystery Theater episodes (1979 season) | 106 |
| List of CBS Radio Mystery Theater episodes (1980 season) | 97 |
| List of CBS Radio Mystery Theater episodes (1981 season) | 132 |
| List of CBS Radio Mystery Theater episodes (1982 season) | 127 |

== Episodes ==
=== January ===
| No. overall | No. in season | Title | Directed by | Written by | Original release date |
|---|---|---|---|---|---|
| 406 | 1 | "One of the Missing" | Himan Brown | Arnold Moss | January 1, 1976 |
A Union Army soldier, along with his buddy, is sent on a reconnaissance mission into enemy territory; a freak explosion leaves him with injuries... and visions of his own funeral. Starring: Kristoffer Tabori; Adapted from the short story by Ambrose Bierce
| 407 | 2 | "Insight Into Murder" | Himan Brown | Roy Winsor | January 2, 1976 |
Flashbacks to the 16th century convince a defense attorney that he witnessed a murder in a past life. He finds the killer living in the present, and vows to not only prove his current client's innocence, but also seek justice in both the past and present crimes. Starring: Gordon Gould, Teri Keane
| 408 | 3 | "Tom Sawyer, Detective" | Himan Brown | Sam Dann | January 5, 1976 |
Tom Sawyer grows up, becomes a lawyer, and faces his most difficult case: Prove the innocence of his Uncle Silas in a homicide. Starring: Kristoffer Tabori, Paul Hecht, Evie Juster, Gilbert Mack, Robert Kaliban; Note: The first of a week-long series of episodes based on the works of Mark Twain (this episode was adapted from the same-named novel).
| 409 | 4 | "Is He Living or Is He Dead?" | Himan Brown | Sam Dann | January 6, 1976 |
A trio of artists living in abstract poverty in the south of France concocts a scheme to increase the value of their paintings and their sales. The catch: One of them has to play dead. Starring: Alexander Scourby, Bryna Raeburn, Court Benson, Paul Hecht; An adaptation of a story by Mark Twain
| 410 | 5 | "The Russian Passport" | Himan Brown | Sam Dann | January 7, 1976 |
Lonesome and alone while traveling through Europe, Alfred Parrish encounters an eccentric, retired U.S. Army officer who encourages him to see Russia without a passport. Chaos ensues, resulting in their conviction in a Russian court and a one-way trip to Siberia. Starring: Robert Morse, Robert Dryden; An adaptation of a story by Mark Twain
| 411 | 6 | "A Connecticut Yankee in King Arthur's Court" | Himan Brown | Sam Dann | January 8, 1976 |
An adaptation of Mark Twain's novel, in which a blow to the head during a fight sends Hank Morgan from 19th century Connecticut to the era of Camelot. Starring: Kevin McCarthy, Robert Dryden, Russell Horton, Arnold Moss
| 412 | 7 | "The Man That Corrupted Hadleyburg" | Himan Brown | Sam Dann | January 9, 1976 |
A small-town newspaper editor tells of how a sack of gold coins left behind by a mysterious stranger corrupts the residents of a town that had prided itself for its honesty. Starring: Fred Gwynne, Ralph Bell; Adapted from the short story by Mark Twain
| 413 | 8 | "The Stolen White Elephant" | Himan Brown | Sam Dann | January 10, 1976 |
Inspector Blunt of the NYPD leads the investigation after a sacred white elephant belonging to Queen Victoria goes missing; Blunt is certain of one thief's guilt in the crime — but said thief has been dead for years. Starring: Robert Dryden, Ian Martin; Adapted from the short story by Mark Twain
| 414 | 9 | "The Mysterious Stranger" | Himan Brown | Sam Dann | January 11, 1976 |
Theodore Fischer meets an angel who promises to grant his every desire — an angel named Satan. Starring: Tony Roberts, Joe Silver; Adapted from an unfinished work by Mark Twain
| 415 | 10 | "What the Shepherd Saw" | Himan Brown | Elizabeth Pennell | January 12, 1976 |
A young shepherd in the shadows of Stonehenge witnesses a killing involving his master and the master's wife... but must prove that he did not see a single thing. Starring: Russell Horton; Adapted from a short story by Thomas Hardy
| 416 | 11 | "The Elixir of Death" | Himan Brown | Sam Dann | January 14, 1976 |
After escaping big-city life for small-town bliss, Dr. Peter Nevins discovers that the mysterious drink the town is famous for has deadly ingredients. Starring: Paul Hecht
| 417 | 12 | "The Red Frisbee" | Himan Brown | Elspeth Eric | January 16, 1976 |
After they meet on a beach in the Antilles, Ben becomes drawn to Nikki's gift of intuition and tragic familial story... while to his surprise, Nikki gains insights from just his red Frisbee. Starring: Robert Dryden, Teri Keane, Jada Rowland
| 418 | 13 | "There's No Business Like" | Himan Brown | Sam Dann | January 19, 1976 |
A time traveler goes forward 100 years and learns first-hand that the show business world of 2076 has a deadly side for the criminals who are sentenced to perform its so-very-real, all-too-lethal stunts. Starring: Howard Da Silva
| 419 | 14 | "The Lady of the Mist" | Himan Brown | Ian Martin | January 21, 1976 |
Enraged by efforts of her brother Charles' new wife to take over the family manor, Meg Drayton seeks to exact a mythic legend involving the manor's waterfall, which cascades into a pool where Charles' first wife mysteriously drowned 10 years earlier. Starring: Rosemary Murphy, Ian Martin, Marian Seldes
| 420 | 15 | "The Slick and the Dead" | Himan Brown | Ian Martin | January 23, 1976 |
A talented dancer with a sordid past is murdered in a hotel room. It's a traditional "whodunit" mystery that's highlighted by series host E. G. Marshall stepping in during the final act and inviting listeners to take a guess as to who the murderer may be. Starring: Russell Horton, Josephine Premice, Rosemary Rice, Mandel Kramer, Earl Hammond
| 421 | 16 | "The Ferret" | Himan Brown | Roy Winsor | January 26, 1976 |
A lawyer for Energy Exploration, Inc. sets up a scheme to entrap the corrupt EEI executive who's sabotaging the company's offshore oil drilling efforts. Starring: Eliot Reid
| 422 | 17 | "Mirror, Mirror" | Himan Brown | Elspeth Eric | January 28, 1976 |
Jessica Chapman sets out to discover whether a gold-framed, full-length mirror she gave to former college roommate Clare Connor played a part in Clare's descent from "the fairest of them all" into a life of unhappiness and familial dysfunction. Starring: Marian Seldes, Marian Haley
| 423 | 18 | "Castle Kerfol" | Himan Brown | Murray Burnett | January 30, 1976 |
After an American is confronted by a pack of dogs while touring a British castle for a possible purchase, a neighbor clues her in on the history of the castle and its former inhabitants. Starring: Mercedes McCambridge, William Redfield, Ian Martin, Guy Sorel

=== February ===
| No. overall | No. in season | Title | Directed by | Written by | Original release date |
|---|---|---|---|---|---|
| 424 | 19 | "First Prize: Death" | Himan Brown | Sam Dann | February 2, 1976 |
Despite being a celebrated sociologist, John Desmond has been constantly passed over for the highest honor in the field, the Parkhurst Medal. But Desmond has a decision to make when a mysterious man promises him the next Parkhurst will be his... so long as he falsifies his research and murders his superior. Starring: Norman Rose
| 425 | 20 | "The Dead Deserve to Rest" | Himan Brown | Ian Martin | February 3, 1976 |
Distraught over her husband's death at the hands of a drunk driver, Tish Meredith becomes easy prey for a false medium who swindles her into believing he can help her contact her husband... for a fee that, it just so happens, equals the insurance settlement Tish received ($1 million). Starring: Jennifer Harmon, William Redfield
| 426 | 21 | "The Children of Death" | Himan Brown | Sam Dann | February 5, 1976 |
In a post-apocalyptic world where hate rules and men and women live separately in hostile tribes, a High Priest's son reluctantly takes part in a deadly game wherein participants must hunt each other down for the sake of growing, through procreation, their respective tribes. Starring: Tony Roberts, Robert Dryden, Evelyn Juster, Marian Seldes
| 427 | 22 | "Straight from the Horse's Mouth" | Himan Brown | Ian Martin | February 6, 1976 |
Mousy bookkeeper Hubert Purley buys a work horse named Mervin, who may not be the racing thoroughbred Hubert mistook him to be... but who can tell him (literally) how to turn a $2 bet at the track into a life-changing windfall. Starring: Robert Morse, Ian Martin
| 428 | 23 | "The Horror of Dead Lake" | Himan Brown | Roy Winsor | February 9, 1976 |
At first, Claude & Polly Baxter are delighted to have inherited a castle and a neighboring lake. But joy turns to fright when they discover the castle has been home to a demented embryologist crossing Venus flytraps with birds... and that the lake is home to something even more horrific. Starring: Gordon Gould, William Prince, Ann Sheppard, George Petrie, Gilbert Mack
| 429 | 24 | "You Owe Me A Death" | Himan Brown | Henry Slesar | February 11, 1976 |
A woman is haunted by her twin sister, who died when they were very young. To put the spirit to rest, she must first unravel the mysteries surrounding her twin. Starring: Patricia Elliott, Vicky Volante, Russell Horton, William Redfield, Ann Pitoniak
| 430 | 25 | "The Golden Chalices" | Himan Brown | Elspeth Eric | February 12, 1976 |
A gift from a patient arouses a memory in psychoanalyst Hans von Fodor, who with wife Lili fled Kispest, Hungary after their wedding 30 years ago, but not before burying a precious wedding gift — 12 golden chalices — with the intent of someday coming back to retrieve them. Starring: Norman Rose, Carmen Mathews
| 431 | 26 | "The Blue Roan Stallion" | Himan Brown | Ian Martin | February 13, 1976 |
After Dan Bowles saves a ranch owner's life, he is immediately hired as a ranch hand and falls for the rancher's daughter. But the ire of more than just the ranch foreman is raised when it is learned that Dan has half-breed Indian ancestry. Starring: Tony Roberts, Earl Hammond, Joe Silver, Rosemary Rice
| 432 | 27 | "Angel of Death" | Himan Brown | Ian Martin | February 16, 1976 |
A distraught nurse contemplates suicide after the death of her son and the growing estrangement with her husband. But then she receives an encouraging reminder about love from the ghost of a patient she once helped pass on. Starring: Marian Seldes, Michael Wager
| 433 | 28 | "The Angry God" | Himan Brown | Saul Panitz | February 17, 1976 |
A jewel thief makes off with a valuable necklace and, with the help of an American tourist, escapes police detection. But the thief can't elude the ire of the goddess who owns the jewelry. Starring: Larry Haines, Evie Juster
| 434 | 29 | "Goodbye, Benjamin Flack" | Himan Brown | Sidney Sloan | February 19, 1976 |
Deep-in-debt businessman Guthrie Flack concocts a scheme to kill identical cousin Benjamin, take his identity, and collect the insurance money. But Benjamin catches on to the plan... as does, independently, Benjamin's wife. Starring: Howard Da Silva, Ralph Bell, Joan Banks, Court Benson
| 435 | 30 | "The Bloody Legend" | Himan Brown | Milt Wisoff | February 20, 1976 |
"Our tale deals with the mind and its fantasies. With acts so foul that only demons can move a man to commit them..." Dash Saxon becomes obsessively immersed in the study of Beowulf, so much so that evidence connects him to carnage at an animal shelter and a double homicide. But Dash has no memory of either crime. Starring: Arnold Moss, Teri Keane, Earl Hammond, Robert Maxwell
| 436 | 31 | "The Patient Visitor" | Himan Brown | Ian Martin | February 23, 1976 |
Despite being at an advanced age (78) and suffering from a failing heart, retired judge Justin Travers vows to put his jurisprudence skills to use one final time to aid a past love — one Muriel Parks, who, despite being the daughter of its biggest benefactor, cannot raise the required upfront fee to gain residence into a home for the elderly. Starring: Ian Martin, Marian Seldes
| 437 | 32 | "General Laughter" | Himan Brown | Elspeth Eric | February 25, 1976 |
In lieu of a written suicide note to her husband and children, a distressed yet consummate actress chooses to record on tape her motives and last breaths. But while she'd prefer to "exit, amid general laughter," she soon learns the difficulty of departing in such a scripted way. Starring: Mercedes McCambridge, Mandel Kramer, Sam Gray
| 438 | 33 | "The Providential Ghost" | Himan Brown | Ian Martin | February 26, 1976 |
In quick succession, 8-year-old Lisha de Pew Miller loses her parents and then her beloved grandfather, forcing her to live with her two aunts who not only frighten her but want her inheritance. Luckily for Lisha, Grandpa's spirit is still hanging around. Starring: Hetty Galen, Beatrice Straight, Bryna Raeburn, Court Benson, Gilbert Mack
| 439 | 34 | "Half a Life" | Himan Brown | Sam Dann | February 27, 1976 |
On a lark, mousy government engineer Dr. Winifred Prentiss visits a singles bar and meets a handsome man who immediately proposes marriage. But then the man asks Dr. Prentiss for $10,000... and information about the top-secret project she's working on. Starring: Tammy Grimes, Tony Roberts, Earl Hammond, Marian Haley

=== March ===
| No. overall | No. in season | Title | Directed by | Written by | Original release date |
|---|---|---|---|---|---|
| 440 | 35 | "The Death Trail" | Himan Brown | Ian Martin | March 1, 1976 |
In late 1860s Texas, bank president Wayne Prescott is given $200,000 by his former Army commanding officer to invest in cattle. It's a request Prescott will not obey because, unbeknownst to his ex-CO, his fiancé, or her father, he is a member of a pre-Civil War gang known for murdering the people they robbed. Starring: Bob Kaliban, Robert Dryden, Marian Seldes, Russell Horton, Ralph Bell
| 441 | 36 | "Afterward" | Himan Brown | Murray Burnett | March 2, 1976 |
A ghostly tale, adapted from Edith Wharton's short story, involving a nouveau riche woman, her husband, his business dealings, and a vengeful spirit. Starring: Celeste Holm, Joan Shay, Ian Martin, Larry Haines, Guy Sorel
| 442 | 37 | "The Monk and the Hangman's Daughter" | Himan Brown | Arnold & Stella Moss | March 4, 1976 |
Two monks are sent to a monastery in Berchtesgaden, Bavaria, where one of them meets and falls for the daughter of the town's hangman; it sparks disdain among the town's citizens and hatred in the son of the town's most powerful man (who wants the daughter as his mistress). Starring: Kristoffer Tabori, Evie Juster, Russell Horton, Arnold Moss; Adapted from the novel by Ambrose Bierce
| 443 | 38 | "The Infernal Triangle" | Himan Brown | Ian Martin | March 5, 1976 |
Ann Fairchild has found happiness with her husband-to-be, Hugh Denning. But the return (from her latest divorce) of Ann's man-hungry older sister, Eve, threatens Ann and Hugh's romantic bliss and rekindles a sibling rivalry. Starring: Morgan Fairchild, William Redfield, Catherine Byers, Joseph Silver
| 444 | 39 | "The Queen of Spades" | Himan Brown | Sam Dann | March 8, 1976 |
A Russian soldier pursues a wealthy countess to seek a secret at winning in faro; bad luck arises instead when the soldier accidentally causes the countess' death. Starring: Michael Tolan, Bryna Raeburn, Ian Martin, Robert Dryden, Ann Shepherd; Adapted from the short story by Alexander Pushkin
| 445 | 40 | "I Thought I Saw a Shadow" | Himan Brown | Bob Juhren | March 10, 1976 |
"Maybe you'd better turn off the lights, that's the surest way I know of getting rid of shadows..." Scientist Dr. John Gilbert is his own test subject for an invisibility serum... which only separates him from his shadow, which goes on a homicidal rampage. Starring: Nat Polen, Joan Shea, Gordon Gould, Lloyd Battista
| 446 | 41 | "Pandora" | Himan Brown | Sam Dann | March 11, 1976 |
Hundreds of thousands of years in the future, a woman named Mara is condemned to death for inflicting sorrow on a hate-free, fear-free society; but as she is about to be executed, she is instead sent into the past... and begins to appreciate the blissful life she once had. Starring: Patricia Elliott, Norman Rose
| 447 | 42 | "The Man Who Preyed on Widows" | Himan Brown | Roy Winsor | March 12, 1976 |
Despite being swindled out of her money, a widow refuses to take action against the grifter who conned her; her children are not acquiescent, however, and find satisfaction when police ascertain the crook's next victim. Starring: Mason Adams, Russell Horton, Joan Shay, Jackson Beck
| 448 | 43 | "The Aliens" | Himan Brown | Sam Dann | March 15, 1976 |
A classified US/USSR experiment in psychic communication draws together two secret agents (one American, one Russian), who realize that the project their governments are working on could potentially destroy mankind. Starring: Paul Hecht, Mandel Kramer, Marie Cheatham, Robert Dryden
| 449 | 44 | "Crime Casts a Shadow" | Himan Brown | Roy Winsor | March 16, 1976 |
In need of cash, Gay Armstrong tries to sell her late mother's pearl necklace; but then she learns the pearls are fake, just as her stepfather offers her $15,000 for the necklace. Starring: Evie Juster, William Redfield
| 450 | 45 | "The Other Side of the Coin" | Himan Brown | Ian Martin | March 18, 1976 |
A supernatural accident causes an ex-police sergeant and a mob-tied con artist to swap bodies. Starring: Ralph Bell, Ian Martin, Robert Kaliban, Bryna Raeburn
| 451 | 46 | "A Matter of Love and Death" | Himan Brown | Elspeth Eric | March 19, 1976 |
Helen Collins walks into a police station and confesses to an unbelieving sergeant that dealing with fans pursuing her celebrity husband led her to kill him. Starring: Lois Nettleton
| 452 | 47 | "Stampede" | Himan Brown | Ian Martin | March 22, 1976 |
After Comanche warriors murder her husband and their beet crop and farm are destroyed by a stampede, Ellie Tate Gottenschalk joins an all-male cattle drive. Trouble (including that of the supernatural variety) ensues. Starring: Catherine Byers, Fred Gwynne, Kristoffer Tabori, Gilbert Mack, Earl Hammond
| 453 | 48 | "The Covered Bridge" | Himan Brown | Ian Martin | March 23, 1976 |
"There is nothing dark or foreboding about the tunnel Ted and Peg Marshall will drive into. It's a simple, short bridge in New Hampshire."; But this bridge transports Peg, on her honeymoon with Ted, from the 1970s to the 1770s... and into an arranged marriage with someone else. Starring: Jada Rowland, Robert Kaliban
| 454 | 49 | "Brain Drain" | Himan Brown | Ralph Goodman | March 24, 1976 |
A government agent explores the disturbing deaths of noted scientists, which appear to be connected to a beautiful woman... and a deranged scientist's heinous experiments. Starring: Paul Hecht
| 455 | 50 | "The Transformation of Joebee" | Himan Brown | Sam Dann | March 25, 1976 |
After years of pulling practical jokes, Joseph B. Jefferson ("or Joebee, as he is unaffectionately called") mends his ways and advises two friends (and former joke targets) on a potential heirloom sale to royalty... a plan that could possibly be yet another prank. Starring: Joseph Silver, Ian Martin, Bryna Raeburn, Hans Conried
| 456 | 51 | "Extortion" | Himan Brown | Roy Winsor | March 26, 1976 |
A state senator learns his wife is being blackmailed for a fatal hit-and-run accident she committed during her college days. Starring: Mandel Kramer, Evie Juster
| 457 | 52 | "The Saxon Curse" | Himan Brown | Sam Dann | March 29, 1976 |
An arrogant aristocrat learns from a fortune teller that he will carry out the perfect murder and not get caught; he doesn't believe the prediction... but sets out on selecting his victim anyway. Starring: Paul Hecht; Adapted from a story by Oscar Wilde
| 458 | 53 | "The Intruders" | Himan Brown | Elspeth Eric | March 30, 1976 |
A woman is troubled by a trio of strangers in her home; they do not acknowledge her presence, leading her to believe they are ghosts. Starring: Lois Nettleton, Fred Gwynne, Carmen Matthews, Russell Horton
| 459 | 54 | "The Spit and Image" | Himan Brown | Ian Martin | March 31, 1976 |
A retired football player is hired to serve as the stand-in for a reclusive, eccentric billionaire. Starring: Michael Tolan

=== April ===
| No. overall | No. in season | Title | Directed by | Written by | Original release date |
|---|---|---|---|---|---|
| 460 | 55 | "The White Ghost" | Himan Brown | Sam Dann | April 1, 1976 |
Donald Taylor ends his secret affair with Trudy Nelson and returns to his invalid wife. It leads to Trudy threatening to kill Donald... which leads to Trudy's accidental death. But even in death, Trudy won't leave Donald alone; in fact, she may very well be as close as a phone call. Starring: Ralph Bell, Joan Shay, Anne Williams, Earl Hammond
| 461 | 56 | "Vanity Dies Hard" | Himan Brown | Sidney Sloan | April 2, 1976 |
An arrogant, vengeful mystery writer thinks he's pulled off the perfect crime: He's murdered his cheating wife's lover, he's pinned her for the crime... and he's helping police with the investigation. Starring: Robert Dryden, Marian Seldes
| 462 | 57 | "Time Killer" | Himan Brown | Arnold Moss | April 5, 1976 |
Believing time is as elastic as space, a parapsychology professor transports himself to the early period of the Great Depression. But the trouble he gets in during the past will have drastic ramifications for his future. Starring: Mandel Kramer
| 463 | 58 | "The Boy Wonder" | Himan Brown | Alfred Bester | April 6, 1976 |
A school principal, a lawyer, and other adults go on a mad search for Stuart Buchanan and his friends; they've disappeared after the 10-year-old Stuart writes a school composition claiming he and his classmates have invented a matter transmitter and other extraordinary devices. Starring: William Redfield, Kenneth Harvey, Martha Greenhouse, Robert Dryden, Danny Ocko
| 464 | 59 | "The Paradise Café" | Himan Brown | Sam Dann | April 7, 1976 |
A notorious tycoon confesses a heinous crime to his psychiatrist, in an effort to exorcise the murderous demon that possesses him. Starring: Court Benson, Evelyn Juster
| 465 | 60 | "Sleeping Dogs" | Himan Brown | Murray Burnett | April 8, 1976 |
Against all recommendations from his colleagues, her current husband, and the American consul, the wife of a paratrooper who lost his life in World War II ventures to Paris to search for the French Resistance fighter who betrayed her husband to Nazi forces. Starring: Marian Seldes
| 466 | 61 | "Fool's Gold" | Himan Brown | Ian Martin | April 9, 1976 |
A college professor indulges his obsession for finding a dead pirate's sunken (and heavily cursed) treasure. Starring: Mason Adams
| 467 | 62 | "Safe Judge" | Himan Brown | Sam Dann | April 12, 1976 |
An upstanding judge finds his reputation on the line when he's pressured to clear a gangster's son of drug possession charges. Starring: Robert Dryden, Patricia Bruder, William Redfield, Earl Hammond, Bryna Raeburn
| 468 | 63 | "Wishes Can Be Fatal" | Himan Brown | Roy Winsor | April 13, 1976 |
A nursing home resident uses the mysterious power of needlepoint embroidery to torment her wicked daughter-in-law. Starring: Carmen Matthews
| 469 | 64 | "Strange Passenger" | Himan Brown | Roy Winsor | April 15, 1976 |
Out of work (and disenchanted with his profession anyway), a lawyer volunteers to fly off to a distant planet and receive training by aliens... and becomes part of their plan to conquer Earth. Starring: Nat Polen, Bob Kaliban
| 470 | 65 | "Murder Most Foul" | Himan Brown | Ian Martin | April 19, 1976 |
Scottish warriors Macbeth and Banquo encounter a trio of witches who make a series of chilling prophecies that startlingly come true. Starring: Kevin McCarthy, Carol Teitel, Russell Horton, Court Benson, William Redfield; Note: The first of a week-long series of episodes based on the tragedies of William Shakespeare (this episode was adapted from Macbeth)
| 471 | 66 | "The Assassination" | Himan Brown | Ian Martin | April 20, 1976 |
Adapted from Shakespeare's Julius Caesar, this episode chronicles Caesar's final victories, his murder, and its aftermath. Starring: Robert Dryden, Norman Rose
| 472 | 67 | "The Love Song of Death" | Himan Brown | Ian Martin | April 21, 1976 |
An adaptation of Shakespeare's Romeo and Juliet, a tale of star-crossed lovers in the middle of a blood feud between their families. Starring: Kristoffer Tabori, Morgan Fairchild
| 473 | 68 | "The Green-Eyed Monster" | Himan Brown | Ian Martin | April 22, 1976 |
Misplaced jealousy and blind rage drives a military commander to commit the ultimate betrayal against his beloved wife in this adaptation of Shakespeare's Othello. Starring: Arnold Moss, Marian Seldes, Ralph Bell
| 474 | 69 | "Long Live the King is Dead" | Himan Brown | Ian Martin | April 23, 1976 |
A retelling of Shakespeare's Hamlet, in which an heir to the Danish throne seeks revenge after his murderous uncle claims the crown. Starring: Tony Roberts, Arnold Moss
| 475 | 70 | "The Prince of Evil" | Himan Brown | Ian Martin | April 24, 1976 |
A man with loads of charm proceeds with his bloody ascension to the throne in this vivid retelling of Shakespeare's Richard III; Starring: Howard Da Silva
| 476 | 71 | "The Serpent of the Nile" | Himan Brown | Ian Martin | April 25, 1976 |
A retelling of Shakespeare's Antony and Cleopatra, in which a Roman politician is beguiled by the queen of Egypt. Starring: Kevin McCarthy, Lois Nettleton
| 477 | 72 | "The Three Elders of Lifeboat Landing" | Himan Brown | Roy Winsor | April 26, 1976 |
A New York hamlet seems to be an idyllic place (clean air, no crime, etc.)... but as an inquiring reporter soon finds out, anyone who disturbs such bliss, in any way, must pay a steep price. Starring: Robert Phelps, Mason Adams, Ann Shepherd, Guy Sorel, Mandel Kramer
| 478 | 73 | "Two Plus Two Equals Death" | Himan Brown | Alfred Bester | April 29, 1976 |
Peter Gerard takes his father's place in a traveling circus act and falls in love with one of the show's ballerinas... who, unfortunately for Peter, has a cruel identical twin sister. Starring: William Redfield, Marian Seldes

=== May ===
| No. overall | No. in season | Title | Directed by | Written by | Original release date |
|---|---|---|---|---|---|
| 479 | 74 | "The Cornstarch Killer" | Himan Brown | Sam Dann | May 3, 1976 |
Police are baffled by a series of murders; the perpetrator appears to be a virtuous woman who can bring the wrath of God down on anyone who approaches her with impure intentions. Starring: Robert Dryden, Earl Hammond, Marian Seldes
| 480 | 75 | "What a Change in Hilda" | Himan Brown | Bob Juhren | May 6, 1976 |
Impressed by its results on her untalented friend (who is now a top concert singer), Hilda Turner starts seeing a doctor who claims anyone can attain their heart's desire solely through meditation. The charge for the service is only $100... but in the long run, the results are more than what Hilda bargained for. Starring: Lois Nettleton
| 481 | 76 | "The Ghost of San Juan Hill" | Himan Brown | Sam Dann | May 10, 1976 |
A couple's wedding plans are disrupted by the bride's deceased husband, who had supposedly perished while charging up San Juan Hill in the Spanish–American War. Starring: Jack Grimes, Marian Hailey, William Redfield
| 482 | 77 | "The Secret Sharer" | Himan Brown | Elizabeth Pennell | May 13, 1976 |
An adaptation of Joseph Conrad's short story about a fugitive, his alter ego, and the ship captain who accommodates them both. Starring: Norman Rose, Mandel Kramer
| 483 | 78 | "Blind Witness" | Himan Brown | Sam Dann | May 17, 1976 |
Police — and the assailant — are on the hunt to find a blind woman who unknowingly witnessed the murder of a pharmacist. Starring: Patricia Elliott, Carmen Matthews, Leon Janney
| 484 | 79 | "The Walking Dead" | Himan Brown | Alfred Bester | May 20, 1976 |
On a planet where crime is unknown, an organically-constructed android servant becomes tired of his work and goes on a deadly spree of violence. Starring: Jack Grimes, Paul Hecht
| 485 | 80 | "A Mexican Standoff" | Himan Brown | Ian Martin | May 24, 1976 |
After small-town Nebraska mailman George Adams is honored as "Mr Good Citizen USA," he and his wife are invited to an all-expenses-paid trip to Mexico City, arranged by a benefactor whose face George finds frighteningly familiar. Starring: Joe Silver, Catherine Byers
| 486 | 81 | "Demon Lover" | Himan Brown | Sam Dann | May 27, 1976 |
A college professor finds himself the unwilling object of a colleague's obsessive — and violent — romantic advances. Starring: Mandel Kramer
| 487 | 82 | "Ghost Town" | Himan Brown | Ian Martin | May 31, 1976 |
A man who's escaped from a mental institution carjacks a schoolteacher and orders her to drive to a deserted Death Valley town to find an old relative. Starring: Ralph Bell, Lois Nettleton

=== June ===
| No. overall | No. in season | Title | Directed by | Written by | Original release date |
|---|---|---|---|---|---|
| 488 | 83 | "Blue Justice" | Himan Brown | Sam Dann | June 3, 1976 |
A corrupt assistant prosecutor in a totalitarian state convicts for capital murder a man he knew was innocent. Now after his execution, the defendant's ghost haunts the prosecutor, and the spirit's desire for justice begins with the discovery of two blue ribbons. Starring: Leon Janney, Jason Beck
| 489 | 84 | "The Corpse That Would Not Die" | Himan Brown | Arnold Moss | June 7, 1976 |
A man murders his best friend so that he can marry his wife, but their relationship begins to erode by the weight of their sins. Starring: Patricia Elliott, William Redfield; Adapted from the novel Thérèse Raquin by Émile Zola
| 490 | 85 | "Free the Beast" | Himan Brown | Ralph Goodman | June 10, 1976 |
A freak accident that claims the life of an insane asylum inmate leads to an investigation centering on the horrifying familial secrets surrounding another inmate... who's been having clandestine conversations with an unseen visitor. Starring: Paul Hecht, Marian Seldes, Joan Lovejoy, Ian Martin
| 491 | 86 | "The Unthinkable" | Himan Brown | Sam Dann | June 14, 1976 |
While wife Roxanne lands a bank manager's job (and starts climbing the career ladder), out-of-work electrical engineer Walt Robinson begrudgingly does housework. That is, until he learns from an equally down-on-his-luck architect that they, too, can enter the financial industry — by robbing the very bank where Roxanne works. Starring: Larry Haines, Teri Keane, Russell Horton, Robert Maxwell
| 492 | 87 | "Pension Plan" | Himan Brown | Sam Dann | June 17, 1976 |
On the eve of his retirement, a purchasing manager discovers that a career of being honest and straightforward has left him with no financial reward whatsoever. Starring: Norman Rose, Ann Pitoniak, Leon Janney, William Redfield
| 493 | 88 | "Checkmate" | Himan Brown | Ian Martin | June 21, 1976 |
A rookie police detective and her crotchety veteran partner encounter an apartment building full of peculiar suspects while investigating the murder of a genius chess player's friend and frequent opponent. Starring: Robert Dryden, Marian Hailey, Court Benson, Bryna Raeburn
| 494 | 89 | "Child of Fate" | Himan Brown | Elspeth Eric | June 24, 1976 |
Ignored by her busy father and invalid mother, Halcyon Trent created an imaginary friend named Gerald. Theirs is a companionship that lasts into their teenage years, when Halcyon makes new, real friendships... and Gerald becomes really, and dangerously, jealous. Starring: Jada Rowland, Guy Sorel, Anne Williams, Kenneth Harvey
| 495 | 90 | "Forty-Five Minutes to Murder" | Himan Brown | Sam Dann | June 28, 1976 |
A years-long business feud ends with a peace offering from chemical company associate Jim Raglan to vice-president Emmet Martindale: A bottle of cognac laced with poison, which instantly kills Martindale's wife. Just who's responsible for the death hangs on inconsistencies in both men's statements to authorities, as well as the question of just how fast poison works. Starring: Larry Haines, Leon Janney, Joan Shay, Court Benson, Sam Gray

=== July ===
| No. overall | No. in season | Title | Directed by | Written by | Original release date |
|---|---|---|---|---|---|
| 496 | 91 | "Loser Takes All" | Himan Brown | Ian Martin | July 1, 1976 |
Theatrical agent Jake Alexander takes a professional and personal interest in Delphi Carr, whom Jake considers the world's most beautiful woman. Then Delphi marries an actor and asks Jake to represent him before he represents her. Jake is willing to go along... though he has murderous intentions in doing so. Starring: Patricia Elliott, Ian Martin, Paul Hecht, Nat Polen
| 497 | 92 | "Blood Red Roses" | Himan Brown | Sam Dann | July 12, 1976 |
His son's death at the hands of mobsters shakes the usually pacifist beliefs of Nick Birko. So he takes matters into his own hands by meeting the mafia don behind the murder... and taking an instant liking to him. Starring: Robert Dryden, Arnold Moss, Bryna Raeburn, Robert Kaliban, William Redfield
| 498 | 93 | "The Last Trip of Charter Boat Sally" | Himan Brown | Roy Winsor | July 15, 1976 |
The captain of a tugboat-turned-fishing charter is implicated by a scheming woman and her beach-bum boyfriend for the murder of the woman's husband. Starring: Robert Dryden, Teri Keane, Mandel Kramer, Russell Horton
| 499 | 94 | "Future Eye" | Himan Brown | Alfred Bester | July 19, 1976 |
An investigator from the future is sent back to the present day to retrieve a data bank, no bigger than a matchbox, that holds a chronology of time up until the year 2976 — a 1000-year history that could be wiped out if the device falls into the wrong hands. Starring: Tony Roberts
| 500 | 95 | "The Men with the Magic Fingers" | Himan Brown | Sam Dann | July 22, 1976 |
A carnival owner at the turn of the century creates a lifelike doll, Leonora, that can predict customers' futures. But the barker then falls in love with his own creation, much to his wife's consternation. Starring: Mason Adams, Catherine Byers, Marian Seldes, Earl Hammond
| 501 | 96 | "The Brain Without Mercy" | Himan Brown | Ian Martin | July 26, 1976 |
Dr. Werner Diethardt finds a severely injured skyjacker who made off with $2 million... and removes the crook's brain, so that it can tell him where he hid the loot (it's money Dr. Diethardt wants to use for his research). Starring: Norman Rose, Ian Martin
| 502 | 97 | "Shotgun Wedding" | Himan Brown | Sam Dann | July 29, 1976 |
Gus Virko sets colleague Charley Demerest up with his daughter. Despite Charley's apprehension, it's a perfect romantic match... that soon turns into a nightmare. Starring: Jack Grimes, Patricia Elliott, Leon Janney

=== August ===
| No. overall | No. in season | Title | Directed by | Written by | Original release date |
|---|---|---|---|---|---|
| 503 | 98 | "Every Dog Has His Day" | Himan Brown | Ian Martin | August 2, 1976 |
As his sons argue over who should receive his estate, and his lawyer's daughter ponders which of the two she's truly in love with, an ailing millionaire has only two faithful servants by his side — his butler, Chadsworth, and his dog, Whiskey, the latter of whom may be smart enough to sort out the estate. Starring: Court Benson, Russell Horton, Morgan Fairchild, Ian Martin
| 504 | 99 | "Lovers and Killers" | Himan Brown | Sam Dann | August 5, 1976 |
The fate of a lothario accused of murdering his lover's husband rests in the hands of a jury... in particular David Miller (a.k.a. Juror #2), who didn't want to fulfill his civic duty, but now finds himself struggling to determine whether it was the wife or the lothario who had the more believable testimony. Starring: Robert Dryden, Russell Horton, Marian Seldes, Evie Juster, Robert Maxwell
| 505 | 100 | "Overnight to Freedom" | Himan Brown | Sam Dann | August 9, 1976 |
An American POW escapes his captors and tries to reach a French Underground contact, but encounters friendly faces who may be hiding ulterior loyalties. Starring: William Redfield, Robert Dryden, Earl Hammond, Mandel Kramer, Rosemary Rice
| 506 | 101 | "The Haliday Prediction" | Himan Brown | Fielden Farrington | August 12, 1976 |
Cash Haliday fills his weekly newspaper column on crime and corruption with predictions that come true. Cash's talent could be a case of uncanny insight, ESP, or just wishing things into reality (as his secretary/girlfriend thinks)... but whatever it is, it just might come in handy when a gangster threatens his life. Starring: Tony Roberts, Morgan Fairchild, Robert Dryden, Ian Martin
| 507 | 102 | "Your Grade Is A" | Himan Brown | Roy Winsor | August 16, 1976 |
The wife of a creative writing student is found dead of carbon monoxide poisoning; was her death accidental, suicide... or foul play inspired by the teacher's advice on a murder mystery assignment? Starring: Bob Kaliban, Joan Shay
| 508 | 103 | "The Golden People" | Himan Brown | Sam Dann | August 19, 1976 |
Richard Paradon has the looks, charm, and smarts to make money in an unsavory way — by bilking beautiful, wealthy women out of theirs. Then he meets a woman who's neither rich nor pretty... but proves hard to leave behind. Starring: William Redfield
| 509 | 104 | "The Train Stops" | Himan Brown | Elspeth Eric | August 23, 1976 |
A small town doctor's daughter falls in love with a mysterious man who comes to town on the same train every week... and continues to do so even after the town loses its spot on the train schedule. Starring: Norman Rose
| 510 | 105 | "The Man Who Could Work Miracles" | Himan Brown | Arnold Moss | August 26, 1976 |
Set in New York's Bowery neighborhood, c. 1899, this adaptation of H. G. Wells' short story chronicles a man who realizes he can alter fortunes and make wishes reality out of sheer will; it leads to strange miracles coming true... but it also leads to hubris on the man's part. Starring: William Redfield
| 511 | 106 | "The Night Shift" | Himan Brown | Sam Dann | August 30, 1976 |
Eddie O'Brian loathes working 9-hour shifts each day as a bus driver. That is, until he is assigned a brand new bus, #2792, and soon gives it more tender loving care than what he provides his wife. Starring: Howard Da Silva, Bryna Raeburn, Earl Hammond, William Griffis

=== September ===
| No. overall | No. in season | Title | Directed by | Written by | Original release date |
|---|---|---|---|---|---|
| 512 | 107 | "The Magic Cay" | Himan Brown | Ian Martin | September 2, 1976 |
Tom Reynolds leaves behind his wife, children, and boring job and, upon the advice of a psychiatrist friend, takes a two-week vacation on a remote Caribbean island — a locale that, as evidenced by a seemingly dead woman washing up onshore, appears to hold some sort of magic. Starring: Paul Hecht, Marian Seldes, Leon Janney, Ian Martin
| 513 | 108 | "Graven Image" | Himan Brown | Bob Juhren | September 6, 1976 |
Jodie Barnes is a talented singer on the county fair circuit when he meets talent agent Craig Herbert. Their partnership makes Jodie a national star... but a frightful product that bears Jodie's likeness proves all too much. Starring: Jack Grimes, Robert Dryden, Hetty Galen
| 514 | 109 | "Killer's Helper" | Himan Brown | Sam Dann | September 7, 1976 |
John Masters has neglected his wife, Margaret, for so long that when he invites newly promoted protégé Marty Carroway home for dinner, Margaret asks Marty to not only start an affair with her, but to kill John and take his place as head of the company. Starring: Michael Wager, Joan Banks, Robert Dryden, Evelyn Juster
| 515 | 110 | "A Two-Bit Fortune" | Himan Brown | Ian Martin | September 9, 1976 |
Auto mechanic Mike Wilson comes to the aid of a bum who claims to be the billionaire businessman Stanford Spruce. Mike doesn't believe him... until he learns that he's the sole heir of Spruce's entire fortune. Starring: Paul Hecht, Leon Janney, Morgan Fairchild, Ian Martin
| 516 | 111 | "A Magical Place" | Himan Brown | Elspeth Eric | September 10, 1976 |
A middle-aged couple find the house they rented as newlyweds, and rent it again in an aim to rekindle their marriage and recapture the joys of their youth. But unseen voices would prefer that the property not be restored. Starring: William Redfield, Marian Seldes
| 517 | 112 | "The Tell-Tale Corpse" | Himan Brown | Fielden Farrington | September 13, 1976 |
Just out of prison, Ernie and Sid visit the aunt of a deceased fellow prisoner, who can help open a chest that contains $100,000. But trouble arises when the ex-cons kill the aunt and claim her half of the loot. Starring: Court Benson, Earl Hammond, Catherine Byers
| 518 | 113 | "Journey to Jerusalem" | Himan Brown | Sam Dann | September 14, 1976 |
Elwood Jarvis longs to be young again and be appreciated for his personality and not his business success. A strange raven-haired woman says she can help make it happen... provided someone is willing to lend Elwood his body. Starring: Vincent Gardenia, Joan Shay
| 519 | 114 | "Dr. Peterson's Pills" | Himan Brown | Fielden Farrington | September 16, 1976 |
In his 25 years as a doctor in small-town Maine, Emery Peterson has possessed just about every type of cure-all for his patients. But his curative skills came with a devilish price... and payment is now due. Starring: Leon Janney, Catherine Byers, Rosemary Murphy, Joseph Silver
| 520 | 115 | "To Whom It May Concern" | Himan Brown | Sam Dann | September 17, 1976 |
Rebecca Randolph Owen has mysteriously avoided death more than several times... and discovers those escapes from the Angel of Death's clutches have come with a personal price. Starring: Marian Seldes, Ian Martin
| 521 | 116 | "A Very Dear Ghost Indeed" | Himan Brown | Ian Martin | September 20, 1976 |
Thanks to a washed-out bridge, a father and daughter traveling Ireland in the late 19th century are waylaid at an old castle, where a resident tells them a story about another man who sold his offspring, and then his soul, for money. Starring: Court Benson, Patricia Elliott, Russell Horton, Ian Martin
| 522 | 117 | "The Rainbow Man" | Himan Brown | Ian Martin | September 21, 1976 |
An Old West con artist helps a man who lost his fortune to a cardshark, who's now threatening the town and the man's relationship with his fiancée. Starring: Ralph Bell
| 523 | 118 | "Don't Play with Matches" | Himan Brown | Sam Dann | September 23, 1976 |
Thanks to fire chief Delbert Casseroll's prevention program, fire calls in Caswell Corners have become almost non-existent. It allows Delbert to indulge in his hobbies on Friday nights, including lying, adultery, murder... and arson. Starring: Mandel Kramer, Earl Hammond, Joan Shay, Gilbert Mack
| 524 | 119 | "Queen of the Deadly Night" | Himan Brown | Sam Dann | September 24, 1976 |
After a woman in the Dark Ages sees her husband killed on their wedding night, his apparition appears to advise her that she's destined to become Queen of the Khazars... provided she passes a crucial test. Starring: Marian Seldes, Arnold Moss
| 525 | 120 | "The Ghostly Private Eye" | Himan Brown | Ian Martin | September 27, 1976 |
Psychic detective Flaxman Low investigates a manor in Surrey that its owner believes is cursed by a violent poltergeist. Starring: Larry Haines, Paul Hecht, Ian Martin, Guy Sorel, Betty Winckler
| 526 | 121 | "One Girl in a Million" | Himan Brown | Alfred Bester | September 28, 1976 |
Bester adopts his short story "Time is the Traitor" for this futuristic tale about a rock-star business consultant with twin psychological desires: to seek a duplicate of his long-dead girlfriend... and to kill any man who shares the same last name as the man who killed her. Starring: Michael Tolan, Russell Horton, Ralph Bell, Evelyn Juster
| 527 | 122 | "Not For Sale" | Himan Brown | Fielden Farrington | September 30, 1976 |
After she inherits her late uncle Milo's antique shop (where he was murdered during a robbery attempt) and the building that houses it, Milo's ghost advises Faye Colfax not to sell the property to the man who lives above the shop. Starring: Rosemary Murphy, Gordon Gould

=== October ===
| No. overall | No. in season | Title | Directed by | Written by | Original release date |
|---|---|---|---|---|---|
| 528 | 123 | "The Clairvoyant" | Himan Brown | Elspeth Eric | October 1, 1976 |
Clairvoyant Madame Sonya recalls how, on the eve of World War II, she read a happy future for an American woman, but a horrifying one for her British fiancé and his father. Starring: Tammy Grimes
| 529 | 124 | "The Midas Touch" | Himan Brown | Sam Dann | October 4, 1976 |
Con artist Jim Pangborn and his sidekick successfully swindle a balding bank president into buying a "magic hair restorer". Seeking more success, Jim talks the banker into receiving the next day's financial market results — the date being October 29, 1929. Starring: Bobby Morse, Bryna Raeburn, Robert Dryden, Jason Beck
| 530 | 125 | "Private Stock" | Himan Brown | Sam Dann | October 5, 1976 |
Despite clear evidence, police captain Jim Turner can't bring to arrest his daughter, Ginnie, for a rock star's murder. Starring: Ian Martin, Catherine Byers, Russell Horton, Earl Hammond
| 531 | 126 | "Pool of Fear" | Himan Brown | Fielden Farrington | October 7, 1976 |
For a $10,000 fee, Beth Stillwell talks ex-con Matt Brewster into posing as her fiancé and drowning the stepmother she contempts. Matt agrees... but can't escape the feeling that he's being watched. Starring: Morgan Fairchild, William Redfield, Nat Polen, Ann Shepherd
| 532 | 127 | "The Tortured Twins" | Himan Brown | Ian Martin | October 8, 1976 |
After love at first sight, Adam Duncan marries stage actress Joyce Adams. But Adam realizes he married the wrong Adams sister when he meets Joyce's twin. Starring: Marian Seldes, Paul Hecht
| 533 | 128 | "My Wife Doesn't Understand Me" | Himan Brown | Sam Dann | October 11, 1976 |
Dissatisfied with his marriage and career, a research scientist finds solace in the arms of his new secretary... who has more than love on her mind. Starring: Robert Dryden, Teri Keane, Rosemary Rice
| 534 | 129 | "The God Killer" | Himan Brown | Sam Dann | October 12, 1976 |
A secretary is accused of murdering her boss, an author of violent crime fiction. She insists she's innocent, pinning the blame on one of the author's most sinister characters... who, she claims, will verify her story in person. Starring: Tammy Grimes, Earl Hammond, Ken Harvey, Leon Janney
| 535 | 130 | "The Living Corpse" | Himan Brown | Ian Martin | October 14, 1976 |
A sober member of Philadelphia society has long hidden a wilder double life; his fun-loving girlfriend wants him to end the secrecy... and recommends that he murder his ailing mother. Starring: Hurd Hatfield, Patricia Elliott, Joan Shay, Ian Martin
| 536 | 131 | "A Point in Time" | Himan Brown | Mary Jane Higby | October 15, 1976 |
Two men on a hiking expedition encounter a strange New Mexico town that appears stuck in the 1920s. The inhabitants have a reason for their seclusion. Starring: Paul Hecht, Russell Horton, Teri Keane, Court Benson
| 537 | 132 | "Killer's Appointment" | Himan Brown | Sam Dann | October 18, 1976 |
Lydia Prentiss loves her boyfriend so much that she takes the rap for his crimes of assault and theft against his employer. But when he abandons her while she is in prison, Lydia plots revenge. Starring: Marian Seldes
| 538 | 133 | "The Mission of Atropos" | Himan Brown | Sam Dann | October 19, 1976 |
A reporter investigates the death of a chemical plant's physician, who had uncovered two mysterious fatalities at her factory, which the doctor suspected were related to an illegal substance produced at the factory. Starring: Mason Adams, Joan Lovejoy, Robert Maxwell, Joan Shay, Jackson Beck
| 539 | 134 | "To Hang by the Neck" | Himan Brown | Ian Martin | October 21, 1976 |
With the Civil War concluded, Becky Pryor returns to a Texas ranch and, with a Northerner ranch hand's help, tries to determine if, one year earlier, friend Carrie Conway's death by hanging (on the eve of her wedding) was suicide or foul play. Starring: Marian Seldes, Robert Kaliban, William Griffis, Ann Pitoniak, Martha Greenhouse
| 540 | 135 | "Somebody Stop Me!" | Himan Brown | Sam Dann | October 22, 1976 |
Unattractive cop Bert turns mass murderer when he kills the women who turn down his sincere offers for dates. When Bert confesses his crimes to the detective assigned to the case, his colleague doesn't believe him. Starring: Howard Da Silva, Larry Haines
| 541 | 136 | "The Deathly-White Man" | Himan Brown | Ian Martin | October 27, 1976 |
A woman takes a caretaker job in a remote castle, where the lord and lady of the house are haunted by a seemingly ghostly image... and a dark family secret. Starring: Betsy Palmer, Ian Martin, Russell Horton, Bryna Raeburn
| 542 | 137 | "Absolute Zero" | Himan Brown | Ian Martin | October 28, 1976 |
Linda Russell feels guilt for not being at her mother's bedside when she died... but later has suspects foul play when she learns that her mother's final resting place is empty. Starring: Jada Rowland
| 543 | 138 | "The Unborn" | Himan Brown | Ian Martin | October 29, 1976 |
Newly widowed Duchess Margo Baranya longs for a return to her youth. The devilish financier she's been having a dalliance with is gradually granting that wish. Starring: Mercedes McCambridge, Robert Dryden, Robert Kaliban
| 544 | 139 | "Witches' Sabbath" | Himan Brown | Sam Dann | October 30, 1976 |
Two beautiful women invite Perry Harnishfeger for a night of fun. But the women are actually witches who introduce Perry to the Prince of Darkness, who offers Perry an enticingly murderous proposition. Starring: Larry Haines, Leon Janney, Marian Hailey, Evelyn Juster
| 545 | 140 | "The Queen of Cats" | Himan Brown | Ian Martin | October 31, 1976 |
A woman (and possible witch) is suspected of using her 63 cats to stalk and murder children in a small town. Starring: Tammy Grimes, Jack Grimes, Joseph Silver, Betsy Beard

=== November ===
| No. overall | No. in season | Title | Directed by | Written by | Original release date |
|---|---|---|---|---|---|
| 546 | 141 | "City of the Dead" | Himan Brown | Arnold Moss | November 4, 1976 |
Two late-19th century marine biologists explore a five-mile-deep Caribbean Ocean trough, where they encounter a strange civilization of hostile, man-like creatures. Starring: Kristoffer Tabori, Earl Hammond; Adapted from a story by H. G. Wells
| 547 | 142 | "The Secret Chamber" | Himan Brown | Sam Dann | November 5, 1976 |
"The Hargrave's house... it used to be haunted, but no more! Can I, uh, guarantee that? Well now, supposing I just tell you the story..." A realtor tells of how a woman who, after losing her lover in war, disappeared and returned as a ghost to a house that dates back to Revolutionary times. Starring: Ian Martin
| 548 | 143 | "The Graveyard" | Himan Brown | Elspeth Eric | November 8, 1976 |
A man mourning for the woman he dedicated his life to learns the truth about her death in a hard way. Starring: Norman Rose; Adapted from a short story by Guy de Maupassant
| 549 | 144 | "The Colony" | Himan Brown | Fielden Farrington | November 9, 1976 |
After spotting a UFO, a vacationing couple report their sighting to the sheriff in a sleepy New Hampshire town... after which they find themselves in deep trouble. Starring: Tony Roberts, Morgan Fairchild, Frances Sternhagen, Jackson Beck, Guy Sorel
| 550 | 145 | "Strike Force" | Himan Brown | Sam Dann | November 11, 1976 |
A doctor begins to question everything he's believed about his late birth father (who went missing during the war) when he spots a corpse in the morgue, on which was tattooed the emblem of his father's military regiment. Starring: Michael Wager
| 551 | 146 | "A Question of Identity" | Himan Brown | Murray Burnett | November 12, 1976 |
It's a high-stakes game of To Tell the Truth when a U.S. Government intelligence agent forces Hillary Cummings to identify which among a trio of spies is her ex-husband, who underwent radical facial surgery in the 12 years since Hillary last saw him. Starring: Joan Lovejoy, Robert Dryden, Ian Martin, Joseph Silver
| 552 | 147 | "Meeting by Chance" | Himan Brown | Elspeth Eric | November 22, 1976 |
Two strangers caught in a rainstorm seek shelter in a well-kept house whose only occupant is a blinded cat. Starring: Mandel Kramer, Marian Seldes
| 553 | 148 | "The Awakening" | Himan Brown | Sam Dann | November 23, 1976 |
A police detective investigates a psychiatrist's murder, with the only clue being an audio tape of the murderer's conversation with the victim. Starring: Kim Hunter, Earl Hammond
| 554 | 149 | "M-U-R-D-E-R" | Himan Brown | Fielden Farrington | November 25, 1976 |
After his business partner walks off with their company's funds and commits suicide, Max Picket plays on a Ouija board with his wife and their friends. What the planchette spells out agitates Max. Starring: Ralph Bell, Larry Haines, Marian Hailey, Teri Keane, Marian Seldes
| 555 | 150 | "Blood Will Tell" | Himan Brown | Sam Dann | November 26, 1976 |
For life insurance purposes, Norman Claymore must disclose to his employer's personnel department how his father died. When he learns the secret behind the death that his beloved mother kept hidden, Norman becomes a changed man... for the worse. Starring: Mason Adams
| 556 | 151 | "The Man Who Couldn't Get Arrested" | Himan Brown | Sam Dann | November 29, 1976 |
Parallel realities collide when a Wall Street broker can't determine whether his wife is alive or has been murdered. Starring: Fred Gwynne, Joan Shay, Court Benson, Bill Griffis
| 557 | 152 | "Now You See Them, Now You Don't" | Himan Brown | Alfred Bester | November 30, 1976 |
During World War V (2175 A.D.), a doctor who's been imprisoned as a conscientious objector is tasked to find out why combat shock patients in a military hospital are suddenly disappearing. Starring: Robert Dryden, Leon Janney, Martha Greenhouse, Earl Hammond, Ian Martin

=== December ===
| No. overall | No. in season | Title | Directed by | Written by | Original release date |
|---|---|---|---|---|---|
| 558 | 153 | "How to Kill Rudy" | Himan Brown | Sam Dann | December 2, 1976 |
Rudy Slaymaker discovers that his favorite detective novelist writes tales that predict true crimes. But Rudy must take preemptive action when he discovers the author's latest book about is his own future — in which Rudy's wife conspires with his boss to kill him so that they can marry. Starring: Paul Hecht
| 559 | 154 | "Child of Misfortune" | Himan Brown | Ian Martin | December 3, 1976 |
A pathologist's life is upended when his brother and sister-in-law die in a peculiar fashion and their teenage daughter moves in with him and his wife. Starring: Norman Rose, Jada Rowland, Court Benson, Joan Copeland
| 560 | 155 | "Child of the Sea" | Himan Brown | Bob Juhren | December 6, 1976 |
A man on an ocean swim has his life saved by a beautiful woman. True love ensues, but their relationship appears doomed as he is a native of dry land, while she hails from an undersea kingdom. Starring: Tony Roberts, Evie Juster, Bryna Raeburn, Earl Hammond
| 561 | 156 | "Enough Rope" | Himan Brown | Sam Dann | December 7, 1976 |
A swindler is saved from a hangman's noose by a woman claiming to be his guardian angel; all she asks is that he go straight... and pull off one last scam to make things right with those he conned. Starring: Russell Horton, Evie Juster, Robert Dryden
| 562 | 157 | "Nobody Dies" | Himan Brown | Elspeth Eric | December 9, 1976 |
A decades-spanning tale starts with young mother Alice becoming housekeeper for well-to-do pregnant widow Mrs. Holt. Over the years, their relationship is impacted by that of their children — Alice's son, Jamie, and Holt's daughter, Verity — which extends from their growing years and adolescence to beyond Verity's nuptials... and even after Jamie's death. Starring: Teri Keane, Ann Shepherd, Jack Grimes, Morgan Fairchild
| 563 | 158 | "Identity Crisis" | Himan Brown | Fielden Farrington | December 10, 1976 |
A brain transplant weighs heavily on the doctor performing it, the wives of the donor and the recipient... and the corrupt contractors who want to make sure the surviving brain (that of a state senator) stays quiet. Starring: Gordon Gould
| 564 | 159 | "Hit Me Again" | Himan Brown | Ian Martin | December 13, 1976 |
Much to his wife's distress, a financial planner ditches his job for a new career as a professional gambler, where he applies his experience in actuarial science to counting cards in blackjack. Starring: Paul Hecht
| 565 | 160 | "The Smoking Pistol" | Himan Brown | Sam Dann | December 14, 1976 |
A cop's son (an undercover detective) is murdered and a suspect is found with the weapon; the cop thinks it's an open-and-shut case, but doubts enter his mind when the suspect's mother (who claims her son didn't pull the trigger) begs him to investigate further. Starring: Howard DaSilva, Ann Pitoniak, Rosemary Rice, Robert Kaliban
| 566 | 161 | "The Doctor's Evidence" | Himan Brown | Roy Winsor | December 16, 1976 |
Telepathy plays into a story of an unfaithful husband whose wife dies in an accidental fall... but her son suspects murder, contending she sent him a mental message that her life was in danger. Starring: Frances Sternhagen, Tony Roberts
| 567 | 162 | "A Quiet Evening at Home" | Himan Brown | Sam Dann | December 17, 1976 |
After witnessing a murder at a train station, an unhappily married woman is hesitant to testify lest her reason for being there (she was ready to run away with her lover) be revealed. Starring: Tammy Grimes
| 568 | 163 | "Date of Death" | Himan Brown | Elspeth Eric | December 20, 1976 |
A hypochondriac begins to worry when his doctor tells him he has an aortic aneurysm. But fear is later fused with anger when the doctor later denies ever giving him the diagnosis. Starring: Norman Rose, Larry Haines
| 569 | 164 | "The Lone Survivor" | Himan Brown | Ian Martin | December 21, 1976 |
A plane crash at sea has one survivor, who cannot remember who he is. A police detective, an airline executive, and a doctor work to find out the man's identity. Starring: Russell Horton, Ian Martin, Bryna Raeburn, Ken Harvey
| 570 | 165 | "Double Zero" | Himan Brown | Sam Dann | December 23, 1976 |
Police work a case of a murdered private eye whose wallet contained five $20 bills, each bearing two zeroes written in red ink. Starring: Robert Dryden
| 571 | 166 | "The Magus" | Himan Brown | Elspeth Eric | December 25, 1976 |
A practitioner of black magic charms a young servant girl while in each other's presence, much to the concern of both her mother and her would-be romantic suitor. Starring: Fred Gwynne, Carol Teitel, Jada Rowland, Russell Horton
| 572 | 167 | "The Mark of Cain" | Himan Brown | Ian Martin | December 27, 1976 |
A cattle baron hires a gunslinger with a unique mark in his hair and a dark past in his soul; his arrival arouses love in the rancher's daughter, but also anger in her betrothed. Starring: Ralph Bell
| 573 | 168 | "The Artist" | Himan Brown | Sam Dann | December 28, 1976 |
Nebbish businessman Marc Harrison becomes enthralled by a knife-throwing performer and his assistant/wife — who reciprocates the attention by initiating an affair with Marc. Starring: Michael Wager, Patricia Elliott, Court Benson, Ann Pitoniak; Adapted from a short story by Guy de Maupassant
| 574 | 169 | "Your Move, Mr. Ellers" | Himan Brown | Roy Winsor | December 30, 1976 |
Fondness for the game of chess figures into an insurance investigator's look into who may have stolen priceless gems from a jeweler's shop. Starring: Roger De Koven (as the investigator, Tim Whelan), Bob Readick, Jack Grimes, Jackson Beck
| 575 | 170 | "Tomorrow's Murder" | Himan Brown | Sam Dann | December 31, 1976 |
Stressed sales manager Harold K. Starbright becomes even more anxious when he is shown a cemetery tombstone that displays his future death date. Starring: Robert Dryden

== General sources ==
- Payton, Gordon; Grams, Martin Jr. (January 1999), The CBS radio mystery theater: an episode guide and handbook to nine years of broadcasting, 1974-1982, McFarland & Company, Inc., ISBN 0-7864-0559-7
