= List of CBS Radio Mystery Theater episodes (1979 season) =

Season of American radio series

This is an episode list for the 1979 season of the radio drama series CBS Radio Mystery Theater. The series premiered on CBS on January 6, 1974, and ended on December 31, 1982. A set of 1,399 original episodes aired between January 1974 and December 1982. The series was broadcast every day of the week for the first six years with repeats filling in empty slots starting in February 1974. All episodes are available free at the Internet Archive.

== List of seasons ==
| Episode list | # of episodes |
|---|---|
| List of CBS Radio Mystery Theater episodes (1974 season) | 193 |
| List of CBS Radio Mystery Theater episodes (1975 season) | 212 |
| List of CBS Radio Mystery Theater episodes (1976 season) | 170 |
| List of CBS Radio Mystery Theater episodes (1977 season) | 186 |
| List of CBS Radio Mystery Theater episodes (1978 season) | 176 |
| List of CBS Radio Mystery Theater episodes (1979 season) | 106 |
| List of CBS Radio Mystery Theater episodes (1980 season) | 97 |
| List of CBS Radio Mystery Theater episodes (1981 season) | 132 |
| List of CBS Radio Mystery Theater episodes (1982 season) | 127 |

== 1979 episodes ==
=== January ===
| No. overall | No. in season | Title | Directed by | Written by | Original release date |
|---|---|---|---|---|---|
| 938 | 1 | "Complete Recovery" | Himan Brown | Percy Granger | January 1, 1979 |
As a hit-and-run victim slowly recovers from her injuries, she develops a series of unusual phobias, which in turn become clues into the mystery surrounding her accident. Starring: Mary Jane Higby, Joan Shay, Russell Horton, Jada Rowland
| 939 | 2 | "The Look" | Himan Brown | Sam Dann | January 4, 1979 |
A U.S. Senator sees his work with a Congressional subcommittee on organized crime as buoying his Presidential aspirations… that is, until the inquest moves too close to home. Starring: Michael Tolan, Carol Teitel
| 940 | 3 | "Nefertiti (Part I): The Vulture Screams" | Himan Brown | G. Frederick Lewis | January 8, 1979 |
A 5-part tale of the ancient Egyptian queen Nefertiti begins with her planned marriage to Prince Akhenaten, a timid man who's the target of not only her disdain… but also of those who doubt his leadership and conspire against him. Starring: Tammy Grimes, Russell Horton
| 941 | 4 | "Nefertiti (Part II): To Kill a Pharaoh" | Himan Brown | G. Frederick Lewis | January 9, 1979 |
As a conspiracy to kill Akhenaten fails, Nefertiti finds she's developing love for him, and the two set out to establish a new religion of worship to the God of the Sun. Starring: Tammy Grimes, Russell Horton
| 942 | 5 | "Nefertiti (Part III): The Cobra Strikes" | Himan Brown | G. Frederick Lewis | January 10, 1979 |
Nefertiti establishes Amarna ("The City of Truth") with Akhenaten, learns she is pregnant, and becomes enamored with their army's general. Starring: Tammy Grimes, Russell Horton, Earl Hammond
| 943 | 6 | "Nefertiti (Part IV): The Head with One Eye" | Himan Brown | G. Frederick Lewis | January 11, 1979 |
Akhenaten acts the pacifist as he strengthens Amarna's defenses against threatening neighbors; after their daughter's death, Nefertiti turns with rage against both her husband and the cruel Sun God. Starring: Tammy Grimes, Russell Horton
| 944 | 7 | "Nefertiti (Part V): Curse of the Scarab" | Himan Brown | G. Frederick Lewis | January 12, 1979 |
The storyline ends with Nefertiti arranging a burial ceremony for her daughter involving all the gods instead of the Sun God exclusively; it leads to Akhenaten becoming vengeful against the queen. Starring: Tammy Grimes, Russell Horton
| 945 | 8 | "The Long, Long Sleep" | Himan Brown | Arnold Moss | January 15, 1979 |
Despondent after learning he needs life-saving open heart surgery, a man experiences strange situations in which he believes he is already dead. Starring: Larry Haines; Adapted from the story by H. G. Wells
| 946 | 9 | "The Wandering Wind" | Himan Brown | Elspeth Eric | January 17, 1979 |
Two shy newlyweds move into the bride's home; their view of the decaying place (he wants to renovate it, she's steadfast in leaving it untouched) mirrors their approach to socializing with the rest of the world. Starring: John Beal, Teri Keane; Inspired by the poem "The Deva's Song" by Edwin Arnold
| 947 | 10 | "Side Effects" | Himan Brown | Sam Dann | January 19, 1979 |
A scientist tells his boss that their company's new wonder drug has harmful side effects; the boss, fearing the news could bankrupt the company if it's revealed, kills the scientist. Starring: Robert Dryden, Mandel Kramer
| 948 | 11 | "Let the Buyer Beware" | Himan Brown | Sam Dann | January 22, 1979 |
Marcie purchases a table at an estate sale; her discovery of a twice-fired pistol in its secret drawer leads her to learn about the table's history… and, in turn, a murder scheme in a small town full of intrigue. Starring: Joan Lovejoy
| 949 | 12 | "The Burning Bough" | Himan Brown | Sam Dann | January 24, 1979 |
A woman is convinced a tree bough she saved from a fireplace keeps her son alive; she soon faces a dilemma when her son starts committing serious misdeeds. Starring: Grace Matthews, Norman Rose, Russell Horton, Catherine Byers
| 950 | 13 | "The Dominant Personality" | Himan Brown | Percy Granger | January 26, 1979 |
A waitress from the city starts a new life with her loner husband in the wilderness, but she begins to doubt her man when clues from a series of murders on adjoining land point to him. Starring: Roberta Maxwell, Ralph Bell

=== February ===
| No. overall | No. in season | Title | Directed by | Written by | Original release date |
|---|---|---|---|---|---|
| 951 | 14 | "Love After Death" | Himan Brown | Ian Martin | February 5, 1979 |
Despite a terminal illness, Marta Daninoff continues dual pursuits — as a celebrated concert pianist, and as a wife yearning for a husband she refuses to believe had been "eliminated" after returning to their native Soviet Union. Luckily, her manager has a lead on the latter. Starring: Evie Juster, Norman Rose
| 952 | 15 | "Everybody Does It" | Himan Brown | Murray Burnett | February 7, 1979 |
Theater critic William Crawford vowed to his ex-wife Margaret, an actress, that he would pan her performance in a new play. When William is found murdered, Margaret becomes the investigation's lead suspect… but William's criminal side career may have played a bigger part in his death. Starring: Robert Dryden, Carol Teitel, Earl Hammond
| 953 | 16 | "The Sinister Shadow" | Himan Brown | Elspeth Eric | February 12, 1979 |
A meek, mother-dominated woman tells a tale of how she happened to meet her doppelganger in a seedy bar… and how said double rebelled against her in a lethal way. Starring: Teri Keane, Grace Matthews, Joan Shay
| 954 | 17 | "The Missing Day" | Himan Brown | Percy Granger | February 14, 1979 |
The manager of a nuclear facility tries to recall a day he cannot account for and has no memory of. It was also the day when a shipment of high-grade uranium departed his plant. Starring: Russell Horton
| 955 | 18 | "The Shock of His Life" | Himan Brown | Ian Martin | February 19, 1979 |
A petty gambler is electrocuted while trying to fix his television; the shock gives him the power to foresee the winners of sporting events, but his use of this new power results in disaster. Starring: Larry Haines
| 956 | 19 | "The Great Brain" | Himan Brown | James Agate, Jr. | February 21, 1979 |
Dr. Gregory March is a certified genius who claims that anything can be done through the use of brain power and logic… including freeing oneself from a maximum security prison cell through just the use of a few odd items. Dr March bets a friend and a prison warden that he can do just that. Starring: Gordon Heath; Adapted from the short story "The Problem of Cell 13" by Jacques Futrelle
| 957 | 20 | "Hickory, Dickory, Doom" | Himan Brown | Bob Juhren | February 26, 1979 |
A couple purchase a frequently-malfunctioning grandfather clock at an estate sale and present it to a local minister. It is soon discovered that the clock has a more demonic purpose than just telling time. Starring: Tony Roberts, Patricia Elliott
| 958 | 21 | "Shadows from the Grave" | Himan Brown | James Agate, Jr. | February 28, 1979 |
Xavier and Catherine Zenith inherit the 59-acre estate of his late uncle, George, with the strict requirement that they make sure the crypt in which George is interred is not tampered; but evil occurrences begin to occur after the local priest refuses to bless George's final resting place. Starring: Kristoffer Tabori, Betsy Beard, Court Benson, Fred Gwynne; Adapted from a story by Wilkie Collins

=== March ===
| No. overall | No. in season | Title | Directed by | Written by | Original release date |
|---|---|---|---|---|---|
| 959 | 22 | "The Fall of Gentryville" | Himan Brown | Sam Dann | March 5, 1979 |
A reporter is dispatched to uncover the mystery of a small mountain town that disappeared without a trace. The lone survivor tells a chilling tale of what happened when a rich stranger came to the town. Starring: Michael Tolan, Jackson Beck, Ray Owens, Evelyn Juster
| 960 | 23 | "Watcher of the Living" | Himan Brown | James Agate, Jr. | March 7, 1979 |
A botched science experiment sends an overworked high school teacher and a principal into a purgatory-like dimension, where they encounter strange beings and observe the wrongdoings of the living. Starring: Tony Roberts, Gilbert Mack, Robert Dryden, Bryna Raeburn; Adapted from a short story by H. G. Wells
| 961 | 24 | "All the Time in the World" | Himan Brown | Sam Dann | March 12, 1979 |
A down-on-his-luck con artist thinks he's discovered the secret to eternal life, but later realizes that immortality has its drawbacks. Starring: Ralph Bell
| 962 | 25 | "The Love God" | Himan Brown | Sam Dann | March 14, 1979 |
After alienating the man she wants to marry, a strongly-opinionated woman in British-occupied India appeals to the trace of an Indian love god. Starring: Marian Seldes, Court Benson
| 963 | 26 | "The Unseen Watcher" | Himan Brown | Ian Martin | March 19, 1979 |
A gambler kills his wife and torches their house, hoping the insurance money will settle his debts with a bookie. Unfortunately for him, a helicopter pilot witnesses the crime. Starring: Earl Hammond, Mandel Kramer
| 964 | 27 | "Masks" | Himan Brown | Gerald Keane | March 21, 1979 |
A retired Hollywood producer is relieved of a precious cigarette case during a train ride; his quest to reclaim the stolen item leads him into a dangerous situation. Starring: John Beal
| 965 | 28 | "Enemy from Space" | Himan Brown | Ian Martin | March 26, 1979 |
Aiming to trigger a nuclear war, aliens kidnap the U.S. president and replace him with a lookalike. Aware of the deception, the real president's daughter and his aide try to thwart the scheme. Starring: Mandel Kramer, Evelyn Juster, Russell Horton
| 966 | 29 | "Waste Paper" | Himan Brown | Sam Dann | March 28, 1979 |
Her sexist superiors give police detective Gertrude Millrose one day to investigate a seemingly routine murder case. But more time is needed when Millrose discovers that the victim was more than just some cleaning lady. Starring: Kim Hunter, Lloyd Battista, Earl Hammond

=== April ===
| No. overall | No. in season | Title | Directed by | Written by | Original release date |
|---|---|---|---|---|---|
| 967 | 30 | "Voyage to Intrastar" | Himan Brown | Roy Winsor | April 2, 1979 |
A psychologist who visits his late wife through his dreams tries to prove his belief of a dimension where souls of the dead congregate before their reincarnation. Starring: Norman Rose
| 968 | 31 | "The Believers" | Himan Brown | Percy Granger | April 4, 1979 |
Agatha Pearson finds it peculiar how people enter the Bolivars' house next door but never leave; when she sends her son over to investigate, he discovers a parallel universe within the house. Starring: Joan Shay, Kristoffer Tabori, John Beal
| 969 | 32 | "The Permanent Man" | Himan Brown | Gerald Keane | April 9, 1979 |
On the planet Neptune, c. 2020, a man asks a doctor to perform experiments on his brain; the results are terrifying. Starring: Robert Dryden, Russell Horton, Teri Keane; Adapted from a story by William Morrow
| 970 | 33 | "The Charnel House" | Himan Brown | Ian Martin | April 11, 1979 |
Concerned about her father's well being, Jane Pryor heads to the prestigious Massachusetts clinic that's caring for him. What she finds there is ghastly: Her father is dead, the chief resident is incapacitated, unscrupulous staffers are planning nefarious schemes… and a pair of vicious Dobermans are making sure no one escapes. Starring: Roberta Maxwell, Gordon Gould, Grace Matthews, Court Benson
| 971 | 34 | "Ring of Evil" | Himan Brown | James Agate, Jr. | April 16, 1979 |
A young woman vacationing with her father witnesses a murder. All she can recall is seeing a distinctive ring on the murderer's hand… the same ring that appears on the finger of a potential lover. Starring: Kathleen Quinlan; Adapted from a story by D. H. Maxwell
| 972 | 35 | "The Golden Girl" | Himan Brown | Sam Dann | April 18, 1979 |
Despotic religious leader The Messenger Lawrence is assassinated during one of his revivals. The woman who pulled the trigger tells her lawyer she comes from a futuristic world that knows only happiness and beauty… and whose elders "programmed" her to kill Lawrence lest his evil message spread through the universe. Starring: Earl Hammond, Evie Juster, Gordon Heath
| 973 | 36 | "The Glass Bubble" | Himan Brown | Elspeth Eric | April 23, 1979 |
Doris secludes herself into a glass bubble, believing the sterile environment gives her special psychic powers… including the ability to foresee death. Starring: Teri Keane
| 974 | 37 | "Letter of Love, Letter of Death" | Himan Brown | Sam Dann | April 25, 1979 |
A police detective investigates the murder of a theatrical producer, with evidence pointing to the playwright whose works the producer turned down. Starring: Michael Tolan, Ian Martin, Martha Greenhouse
| 975 | 38 | "War of Angels" | Himan Brown | Ian Martin | April 30, 1979 |
Lucifer and the archangel Michael debate over the ultimate destination of a ruthless businesswoman laying near death; it's a toss-up, for each of her good deeds may have offset all of her evil aspects. Starring: Mandel Kramer, Russell Horton, Ann Williams, Bryna Raeburn

=== May ===
| No. overall | No. in season | Title | Directed by | Written by | Original release date |
|---|---|---|---|---|---|
| 976 | 39 | "The Fabulous Pillow" | Himan Brown | Roy Winsor | May 2, 1979 |
Knocked unconscious after a car crash, Tom Porter dreams himself in the company of a former coworker who, 10 years earlier, he defended against a robbery charge at the expense of his own job… and who in this dream offers Tom some of the stolen loot. Starring: Tony Roberts, Ralph Bell, William Griffis, Teri Keane
| 977 | 40 | "Search for Eden" | Himan Brown | Gerald Keane | May 7, 1979 |
An avalanche sweeps an Ecuadorian mountain climbing guide into an unknown valley, a veritable natural paradise that its residents cannot appreciate because they are all without sight. Starring: Lloyd Battista; Adapted from the H. G. Wells short story "The Country of the Blind"
| 978 | 41 | "The Hole in the Sky" | Himan Brown | Sam Dann | May 9, 1979 |
An ace interstellar pilot is forced into a job smuggling contraband; the only way he can deliver the goods on time is to go through a dangerous wormhole in space. Starring: Mandel Kramer, Joan Shay, Earl Hammond, Russell Horton
| 979 | 42 | "Virtue Is Its Own Reward" | Himan Brown | Sam Dann | May 14, 1979 |
An angel and a demon take on earthly bodies (as a lawyer and a secretary, respectively) in a fight to win the soul of a real estate investor. Starring: Fred Gwynne, Robert Dryden, Bryna Raeburn, Ray Owens
| 980 | 43 | "Messenger from Yesterday" | Himan Brown | Gerald Keane | May 16, 1979 |
A college professor offers as a birthday gift to his wife a life-size statue of a pharaoh… which becomes the professor's unhealthy obsession when it comes to life and starts doing housework. Starring: Norman Rose, Teri Keane, Gordon Gould, Russell Horton
| 981 | 44 | "Help Wanted" | Himan Brown | Sam Dann | May 21, 1979 |
A series of serial killings of lonely old women piques a police detective's interest when his own elderly aunt offers a local grocer as a possible suspect. Starring: Tony Roberts, Carol Teitel
| 982 | 45 | "Dreams" | Himan Brown | Elspeth Eric | May 23, 1979 |
Small-time gambler Ben Bailey uses his wife Gloria's unusual ability to predict, through dreams, outcomes at the roulette table. But the winnings suddenly dry up when a shock dream of her mother's death scares Gloria into a coma. Starring: Kristoffer Tabori, Robert Dryden, Evelyn Juster
| 983 | 46 | "The Outsider" | Himan Brown | Bob Juhren | May 28, 1979 |
Since 1949, no one has entered or left the town of Hanover Hills, nor have its citizens grown old or died, thanks to a rumbling geological fissure nearby. When Doug Watson misses his train stop and arrives in the town, the residents are sure he's the savior that will reunite them with the modern world. Starring: John Beal, Joan Shay, Robert Maxwell, Ray Owens
| 984 | 47 | "A Curious Experience" | Himan Brown | Sam Dann | May 30, 1979 |
A homeless 16-year-old enlists in the Union Army during the Civil War. When he's accused of being a Confederate spy, he rattles off a long and stellar list of co-conspirators to avoid sanction. Starring: Kristoffer Tabori, Robert Dryden, Jackson Beck, Bryna Raeburn; Adapted from a story by Mark Twain

=== June ===
| No. overall | No. in season | Title | Directed by | Written by | Original release date |
|---|---|---|---|---|---|
| 985 | 48 | "Willy and Dilly" | Himan Brown | Sam Dann | June 4, 1979 |
Financial broker Harrison Dillard Wentworth ("Dilly") falls for the charms of Wilhelmina Zurich ("Willy") when she asks him to invest $5000 of her savings. But Willy's advances to the married Dilly are only part of a bamboozle with her blackmailing brother. Starring: Fred Gwynne, Evelyn Juster, Lloyd Battista
| 986 | 49 | "The Pardon" | Himan Brown | Gerald Keane | June 6, 1979 |
A man vows revenge after being incarcerated for accidentally causing his mother-in-law's death; those in his sights include his wife, who has a horrible dream about his pardon. Starring: Larry Haines, Russell Horton, Ray Owens, Carol Teitel; Adapted from a story by Emil Bazan
| 987 | 50 | "Look Who's Coming" | Himan Brown | Ian Martin | June 11, 1979 |
Flo Betts loves watching soap operas, until one day her favorite show is interrupted by space aliens warning of a pending invasion of Earth. She insists what she watched is real, but her science fiction-loving husband, Harry, does not believe her. Starring: Teri Keane, Joe Silver
| 988 | 51 | "The Copenhagen Connection" | Himan Brown | Gerald Keane | June 13, 1979 |
A police detective faces a painful betrayal while tracing a fraudulent insurance claim through Mexico and Europe. Starring: Ralph Bell, Bryna Raeburn, Lloyd Battista, Earl Hammond
| 989 | 52 | "The Unquiet Tomb" | Himan Brown | Elspeth Eric | June 18, 1979 |
A young family move to a remote island already occupied by an old ship's captain and his personal assistant. But tragedy befalls the family when their children mysteriously die and are entombed under their house. Starring: Fred Gwynne, Robert Dryden, Teri Keane
| 990 | 53 | "The Spaces on the Wall" | Himan Brown | Sam Dann | June 20, 1979 |
An art broker hires a private investigator to look into the case of an associate that fell victim to a vicious scam. Starring: Kevin McCarthy
| 991 | 54 | "Mission from Zython" | Himan Brown | Roy Winsor | June 25, 1979 |
A farmer and his son take pictures of a flying saucer landing near a military base. Before long, an alien being comes to demand the pictures… and to reveal why he's on Earth. Starring: John Beal
| 992 | 55 | "The Giuseppe Verdi Autobus" | Himan Brown | Sam Dann | June 27, 1979 |
A widowed woman meets and falls in love with a divorced man while on vacation in Italy. When they travel back to the U.S. together, she agrees to pack a music box in her suitcase… and is arrested at Kennedy Airport after customs agents discover the box contains heroin. Starring: Tammy Grimes, Robert Dryden, Lloyd Battista, Gilbert Mack

=== July ===
| No. overall | No. in season | Title | Directed by | Written by | Original release date |
|---|---|---|---|---|---|
| 993 | 56 | "The Rivalry" | Himan Brown | James Agate, Jr. | July 2, 1979 |
A Washington, D.C. police detective works the murder of a lounge singer with international connections, but an old nemesis who has gone straight may be way ahead of him in the investigation. Starring: Court Benson, John Beal, Kristoffer Tabori, Earl Hammond; Based on a short story by Maurice Leblanc
| 994 | 57 | "The Great White Shark" | Himan Brown | Ian Martin | July 4, 1979 |
Charter boat captain Gunner Trent agrees to take arrogant millionaire J.H. Burden on a fishing expedition. Trent's attraction to his young wife makes Burden jealous… but it's nothing compared to the rage Trent has for the shark that claimed his leg. Starring: Michael Tolan, Ian Martin, Joan Banks
| 995 | 58 | "Smile at a Homely Girl" | Himan Brown | Sam Dann | July 9, 1979 |
Will Bennett is accused by wife Marcia of having an affair… and becomes the prime suspect in Marcia's murder. But evidence from a most unlikely source could verify his innocence. Starring: Larry Haines, Teri Keane, Evelyn Juster, Ray Owens
| 996 | 59 | "The Fools" | Himan Brown | Gerald Keane | July 11, 1979 |
After his father's death, a young man is forced to fend for himself in post-revolutionary Russia, and falls in with a thug with a penchant for crime. Starring: Russell Horton, Fred Gwynne; Adapted from the Maxim Gorky story "One Autumn Night"
| 997 | 60 | "The House of the Dead Heart" | Himan Brown | James Agate, Jr. | July 16, 1979 |
A young college student travels to Siena, Italy to view an undiscovered Leonardo da Vinci painting, and begins a clandestine romance with the secluded daughter of the painting's owner. Starring: Kristoffer Tabori, Gordon Gould, Evelyn Juster; Adapted from the Edith Horton short story "The House of the Dead Hand"
| 998 | 61 | "The Case of the Forced Divorce" | Himan Brown | James Agate, Jr. | July 18, 1979 |
A gentleman con artist and an American police detective come to the aid of a British woman whose husband wants a divorce and custody of their young son. Starring: Robert Dryden, Court Benson, John Beal
| 999 | 62 | "No Man's Land" | Himan Brown | Percy Granger | July 23, 1979 |
The residents of a small French village during World War II capture and put on trial two American soldiers for their actions in the conflict. Starring: Tony Roberts, Earl Hammond, Carol Teitel, William Griffis
| 1000 | 63 | "Catch a Falling Star" | Himan Brown | Nancy Moore | July 25, 1979 |
Out of charity, the people of a small town take their sewing needs to a crazed seamstress… but trouble starts when she volunteers to make a wedding dress for a young bride-to-be. Starring: Carol Teitel, Ralph Bell, Teri Keane, Kathleen Quinlan
| 1001 | 64 | "Relax and Enjoy It" | Himan Brown | Sam Dann | July 30, 1979 |
After they demand a $10 million ransom for his return, a wealthy businessman tries to turn his anti-capitalist kidnappers against each other in an effort to gain his freedom. Starring: Norman Rose, Roberta Maxwell

=== August ===
| No. overall | No. in season | Title | Directed by | Written by | Original release date |
|---|---|---|---|---|---|
| 1002 | 65 | "The (Love) Goddess Caper" | Himan Brown | Sam Dann | August 1, 1979 |
In this episode based on a Mark Twain story, an Italian woman asks the traveling Twain to help obtain her husband's release from a psychiatric institution; he was committed there for claiming he had sculpted what the locals consider an ancient piece of art. Starring: Court Benson (as Twain), Russell Horton, Gordon Gould, Bryna Raeburn
| 1003 | 66 | "Tiger, Tiger, Burning Bright" | Himan Brown | Roy Winsor | August 13, 1979 |
Charlotte Banning complains of an unexplained anxiety, so her psychologist puts her under hypnosis, where she reveals a concealed memory of a vicious tiger attack… suffered by an ancestor 100 years ago. Starring: Robert Dryden, Patricia Elliott
| 1004 | 67 | "Body and Soul" | Himan Brown | Elspeth Eric | August 15, 1979 |
A bedridden woman lapses into a coma and has an out-of-body experience, one that sees her estranged daughter rushing to her mother's bedside. Starring: Teri Keane
| 1005 | 68 | "Taboo Means Death" | Himan Brown | Ian Martin | August 20, 1979 |
A pilot flies to Samoa and finds his old college flame is now a betrothed princess; his attempts to smuggle her out of the country leaves her mother — and the island's deities — unamused. Starring: Russell Horton, Evie Juster
| 1006 | 69 | "Stranger from Nowhere" | Himan Brown | James Agate, Jr. | August 22, 1979 |
A scientist is convinced he is really an alien from another planet, a belief he begins to doubt after encountering a woman who claims to be his wife. Starring: Paul Hecht, Carol Teitel
| 1007 | 70 | "A Cup of Bitter Chocolate" | Himan Brown | Ian Martin | August 27, 1979 |
It's a battle of wits between a rich woman's son (who wants to kill her to inherit her fortune) and the woman's butler (who aims to prevent her murder by any means necessary). Starring: Paul Hecht, Robert Dryden, Joan Shay
| 1008 | 71 | "Ninety Lives" | Himan Brown | Sam Dann | August 29, 1979 |
A waitress takes a fancy to a well-dressed amnesia victim who wanders into her diner one night, much to her suspicious brother's displeasure. Starring: Teri Keane, Fred Gwynne, Russell Horton

=== September ===
| No. overall | No. in season | Title | Directed by | Written by | Original release date |
|---|---|---|---|---|---|
| 1009 | 72 | "Tomorrow Will Never Come" | Himan Brown | Nancy Moore | September 3, 1979 |
The residents of a residential building band together to keep the building's elevator, and the operator that treats said elevator as if it's the love of his life, from obsolescence. Starring: Robert Dryden, Grace Matthews, Earl Hammond, Ray Owens
| 1010 | 73 | "The Man in the Black Cap" | Himan Brown | James Agate, Jr. | September 5, 1979 |
Upon retiring to a country manor, a mine owner receives a mysterious visitor… and afterwards develops a dual personality. Starring: Paul Hecht, Carol Teitel, Ian Martin; Adapted from a story by Edith Wharton
| 1011 | 74 | "The Odyssey of Laura Collins" | Himan Brown | Bob Juhren | September 10, 1979 |
After undergoing hypnotism to cure her severe melancholia, a woman suddenly falls into a coma and finds her spirit wandering the streets of New York, even as her mother is beside herself with grief. Starring: Betsy Beard
| 1012 | 75 | "The Two Sams" | Himan Brown | Gerald Keane | September 12, 1979 |
Retired cop Samson O'Malley and attorney Sam Jacobs start a private investigation firm. Their first case deals with the kidnapping of a wealthy family's infant son — an investigation that uncovers some dark familial secrets. Starring: Fred Gwynne, Russell Horton, Evie Juster, Ian Martin
| 1013 | 76 | "The Guillotine" | Himan Brown | Elspeth Eric | September 17, 1979 |
A loveless, friendless American medical student meets the girl of his dreams while the brutality of the French Revolution surrounds them. Starring: Paul Hecht; Adapted from the short story "The Adventure of the German Student" by Washington Irving
| 1014 | 77 | "You're Better Off Guilty" | Himan Brown | Sam Dann | September 19, 1979 |
A mousy, unexceptional stockbroker discovers the dead body of a famous celebrity… and finds guilty pleasure in being the prime suspect in the case. Starring: Kristoffer Tabori, Joan Shay, Ray Owens, Marian Hailey
| 1015 | 78 | "The Gettysburg Address" | Himan Brown | Gerald Keane | September 24, 1979 |
Murder and kidnapping dog two fortune hunters in pursuit of a treasure supposedly hidden in the area of the famous Civil War battlefield. Starring: Robert Dryden, Earl Hammond, Lloyd Battista; Adapted from a story by Maurice Leblanc
| 1016 | 79 | "The Eighth Day" | Himan Brown | Sam Dann | September 26, 1979 |
Roger Criswell mistreats his wife and ruins the business he inherited from his late father-in-law… who promised to get revenge from beyond the grave should either occur. Starring: Mandel Kramer, Court Benson, Evelyn Juster, William Griffis

=== October ===
| No. overall | No. in season | Title | Directed by | Written by | Original release date |
|---|---|---|---|---|---|
| 1017 | 80 | "The Beast" | Himan Brown | James Agate, Jr. | October 1, 1979 |
With a local sheriff's help, a young boy investigates the death of his father, who was killed in a brutal hit-and-run by a businessman who acts as if nothing out of the ordinary took place. Starring: Norman Rose, Robert Dryden, Carol Teitel, Russell Horton; Adapted from a short story by Edith Wharton
| 1018 | 81 | "The Finger of God" | Himan Brown | Ian Martin | October 3, 1979 |
Her father arranges Carey Randall's marriage to an older, wealthier man. Carey's lover, a poor ranch hand, devises a plan to raise money and have the two of them run away together. Starring: Kristoffer Tabori, Catherine Byers, Ian Martin, Russell Horton
| 1019 | 82 | "Wilhemina Wilson" | Himan Brown | Sam Dann | October 8, 1979 |
"Brush up on your Poe."; The distraught family of an aspiring Olympic swimmer who recently went missing plea with police Sgt. Joe Keller to solve the case. Keller finds help in the titular librarian, who believes clues can be found in the writings of Edgar Allan Poe, which the victim had become obsessed with. Starring: Paul Hecht, Joan Shay, Bryna Raeburn, Ray Owens
| 1020 | 83 | "At the End of the Passage" | Himan Brown | Roy Winsor | October 10, 1979 |
A British military officer in Colonial India succumbs to the heat and begins abusing his servants. But he soon finds release in substance abuse. Starring: John Beal; Adapted from a story by Rudyard Kipling
| 1021 | 84 | "Out of the Mist" | Himan Brown | Elspeth Eric | October 15, 1979 |
A young girl in the country hitches a ride with a motorcyclist and aspiring horticulturalist. When he takes her to her home, he soon discovers mysteries that surround her past. Starring: Russell Horton, Carol Teitel
| 1022 | 85 | "Jerry, the Convincer" | Himan Brown | Sam Dann | October 17, 1979 |
A normally law-abiding yachtsman is lured by his friend into the world of drug smuggling, but soon wants out when he witnesses a brutal murder. Starring: Paul Hecht
| 1023 | 86 | "Sheer Terror" | Himan Brown | Ian Martin | October 22, 1979 |
A police officer must solve the biggest, most important case of his life: The kidnapping of his soap opera actress wife by a deranged fan. Starring: Teri Keane, Larry Haines
| 1024 | 87 | "Dangerous Memory" | Himan Brown | James Agate, Jr. | October 24, 1979 |
At his girlfriend's recommendation, a Vietnam War veteran seeks help from a psychologist after imagined misdeeds from his past begin to plague his sanity. Starring: Larry Haines, Court Benson, Arnold Moss, Catherine Byers; Adapted from a short story by Jacques Futrelle
| 1025 | 88 | "The Alien Guest" | Himan Brown | Elspeth Eric | October 29, 1979 |
After greedy aristocrat Hector de Brissac kills his cousin, Andre, in a duel, Andre promises on his deathbed that he'll return, when Hector least expects it, to come between Hector and all he holds dear, be it health, wealth… or love. Starring: Paul Hecht, Robert Dryden, Patsy Bruder; Adapted from an 1862 short story
| 1026 | 89 | "Who Has Seen the Wind?" | Himan Brown | Nancy Moore | October 31, 1979 |
A claustrophobic woman is trapped in her home in a freak accident, and asks two friends, an actress and her theatrical agent husband, for assistance. Starring: Michael Tolan, Teri Keane, Carol Teitel

=== November ===
| No. overall | No. in season | Title | Directed by | Written by | Original release date |
|---|---|---|---|---|---|
| 1027 | 90 | "The Terrorist" | Himan Brown | Ian Martin | November 5, 1979 |
On the Aegean island of Çeşme, an elderly author, her niece, and her publisher's nephew must outwit a pair of extremists who demand that the trio provide them shelter from in-pursuit authorities. Starring: Russell Horton, Ian Martin, Grace Matthews, Jada Rowland
| 1028 | 91 | "Davey Jerrold's Jacket" | Himan Brown | Sam Dann | November 7, 1979 |
Over 175 years after an emissary deeded the entire Western U.S. to an obscure Native American tribe, that tribe's last living member wants to collect… with only a treaty (signed on the back of a buckskin jacket) and a conniving con artist to back her up. Starring: Betsy Beard, Russell Horton, Ian Martin, Ray Owens
| 1029 | 92 | "House Without Mirrors" | Himan Brown | Elspeth Eric | November 12, 1979 |
An eccentric old man has a strange aversion to mirrors, allowing no such items into his house for fear that Death will stare back at him instead of his own face. Starring: Paul Hecht, Norman Rose, Robert Dryden, Bryna Raeburn; Adapted from the Charles Collins short story "The Compensation House"
| 1030 | 93 | "The $999,000 Error" | Himan Brown | Ian Martin | November 14, 1979 |
A computer printing error allows a crooked lawyer in the Philippines to reap the titular windfall on what was meant to be a $1,000 inheritance check for his client. Starring: Ralph Bell, Jackson Beck
| 1031 | 94 | "The God That Failed" | Himan Brown | Sam Dann | November 19, 1979 |
On a diplomatic mission in a small Asian country, U.S. Senator Bob Blaisdell is knocked unconscious in a plane crash. When he awakens, he discovers that a primitive tribe has mistaken him for a miracle-providing deity. Starring: Fred Gwynne
| 1032 | 95 | "By Word of Mouth" | Himan Brown | Sam Dann | November 21, 1979 |
Lallah, a young priestess to a primitive tribe in India, is cared for by a young doctor, who later takes her in after the tribe outcasts her for being touched by a nonbeliever. Starring: Court Benson, Russell Horton, William Griffis, Carol Teitel; Based on a short story by Rudyard Kipling
| 1033 | 96 | "Strange New Tomorrow" | Himan Brown | Ian Martin | November 26, 1979 |
In a distant, post-apocalyptic world, a supreme leader tasks Dr. Ralph Tremayne with building an army of humanoid robots that can survive through and clean up the ravages of nuclear fallout. If Dr. Tremayne refuses, his wife Una (herself a humanoid) will be destroyed. Starring: John Beal, Teri Keane, Ian Martin, Gordon Heath
| 1034 | 97 | "The Philosopher's Stone" | Himan Brown | Sam Dann | November 28, 1979 |
A down-on-his-luck man asks a soft-hearted banker for a $100 loan, putting up as collateral a stone that he insists is magical. The banker accepts — and begins learning lessons about himself in the process. Starring: Fred Gwynne, Ray Owens, Bryna Raeburn, Earl Hammond

=== December ===
| No. overall | No. in season | Title | Directed by | Written by | Original release date |
|---|---|---|---|---|---|
| 1035 | 98 | "The Specter Bridegroom" | Himan Brown | Elspeth Eric | December 3, 1979 |
After he perishes on their wedding night, the spirit of a bridegroom still appears nightly at the window of his widowed bride. Starring: Paul Hecht, Patsy Bruder, Robert Dryden, Grace Matthews; Adapted from a short story by Washington Irving
| 1036 | 99 | "Appointment at Sarajevo" | Himan Brown | Sam Dann | December 5, 1979 |
A doctor narrates the sordid story of Archduke Franz Ferdinand of Austria, whose assassination, alongside that of his wife (whom his family long dismissed for being a lady-in-waiting despite Franz's true love for her), was the spark that set off World War I. Starring: Tony Roberts, Roberta Maxwell, Court Benson, Robert Dryden
| 1037 | 100 | "If a Body" | Himan Brown | Sam Dann | December 10, 1979 |
Maria McKibben claims her husband, Clarence, walked into a field and vanished, and begs the local sheriff to investigate. Even though the sheriff is unable to find Clarence's whereabouts, he soon begins to suspect foul play. Starring: Fred Gwynne, Bryna Raeburn, Earl Hammond, Ray Owens
| 1038 | 101 | "The Movie Makers" | Himan Brown | Henry Slesar | December 12, 1979 |
A scientist is invited to watch filmed moments from his life. His obsession over the footage drives him to do something rash, prompting his wife to investigate the mysterious company that provided him with the films. Starring: Marian Seldes, Russell Horton, Earl Hammond, Norman Rose
| 1039 | 102 | "Beyond Belief" | Himan Brown | Elspeth Eric | December 17, 1979 |
A young amnesiac woman wandering New York City is taken in by two shop owners, who soon discover a terrible secret behind her pleasant demeanor. Starring: Jada Rowland, Carol Teitel, Ralph Bell, Gerald Hiken
| 1040 | 103 | "Shadow of a Lover" | Himan Brown | Sam Dann | December 19, 1979 |
Convinced "the look in his eye" is calling her, mousy Mayetta Mosby heads to Hollywood to meet her favorite movie star, Clovis Hollister. But when Clovis makes a pass at her, she inadvertently kills him. The circumstantial evidence she leaves behind ties Clovis' girlfriend to the murder. Starring: Michael Tolan, Bryna Raeburn, Evelyn Juster, Russell Horton
| 1041 | 104 | "Death is a Woman" | Himan Brown | Elspeth Eric | December 25, 1979 |
Gregory Chalmers invites two friends from college to his seaside residence, where he tells them of a mysterious painting in his bedroom — one that allows Gregory's visitors insight into the women in their lives. Starring: Gordon Heath, William Griffis, Robert Dryden
| 1042 | 105 | "Between These Worlds" | Himan Brown | Ian Martin | December 27, 1979 |
An alien prisoner on the planet Kronek is dispatched to Earth to scout it out as a potential conquest. After crash landing in the Atlantic Ocean, he becomes enamored by a human couple, who convince him to build a new spaceship to return home. Starring: Tony Roberts, Robert Dryden, Carol Teitel
| 1043 | 106 | "The (One) Thousand Pound Gorilla" | Himan Brown | Sam Dann | December 31, 1979 |
Franklyn Wilkinson enjoys a happy life with a supportive wife, Wendy… until a man claiming to be Wendy's ex-husband tells Franklyn that Wendy once tried to murder him — and warns that she may kill Franklyn as well. Starring: Mandel Kramer, Teri Keane, Earl Hammond

== Sources ==
- Payton, Gordon; Grams, Martin Jr. (January 1999), The CBS radio mystery theater: an episode guide and handbook to nine years of broadcasting, 1974-1982, McFarland & Company, Inc., ISBN 0-7864-0559-7
