= Paul Hecht =

English-born Canadian actor (born 1941)

- Born: August 14, 1941 (age 85); London, England
- Citizenship: United Kingdom; Canada
- Education: National Theatre School of Canada
- Occupation: Actor
- Years active: 1967–present
- Spouses: Lynn Vogt (m. 1985; div. 1995) Ingeborg (m. 1965; div. 1976) Peggy Eisenhauer (m. 2002)

Paul Hecht (born August 16, 1941) is an English-born Canadian stage, film, voice and television actor known for playing radio newsman Ross Buckingham in Howard Stern's Private Parts.

== Early life and education ==
Born in London, England, Hecht graduated from the National Theatre School of Canada in 1963.

== Career ==
Hecht made his Broadway debut in 1968 in Rosencrantz and Guildenstern Are Dead, for which he was nominated for the Tony Award for Best Performance by a Featured Actor in a Play. Additional Broadway credits include 1776 (as John Dickinson), The Rothschilds, The Great God Brown, Herzl, Caesar and Cleopatra, Noises Off, and The Invention of Love. He received the Obie Award for his performance in the off-Broadway production of Enrico IV in 1989.

Hecht voiced a role in the 2010 animated film My Dog Tulip. He played Emperor Palpatine for the radio drama adaptions of The Empire Strikes Back and Return of the Jedi. Hecht was a regular performer on Himan Brown's CBS Radio Mystery Theater between 1974 and 1982.

Hecht's extensive television credits include the recurring role of Allie's ex-husband Charles on Kate & Allie, frequent guest shots on Law & Order, Law & Order: Special Victims Unit, As the World Turns, Starsky & Hutch, Remington Steele, Miami Vice, and Queer as Folk.

Hecht has performed with the Philadelphia Orchestra, the Allentown Symphony, at the 92nd Street Y, and performs a program of John Donne sonnets with the early music group Parthenia. He has recorded many books for Recorded Books and Audible. Hecht was president of the New York chapter of the Screen Actors Guild from 1991 to 1995.

== Filmography ==
=== Film ===
Year	Title	Role	Notes
1971	The Selfish Giant	Narrator	Voice
1974	Only God Knows	Rabbi Isaac Sherman	
1975	The Reincarnation of Peter Proud	Dr. Samuel Goodman	
1981	Threshold	Heart Day M.C.	
1981	Rollover	Khalid	
1982	Tempest	Paul	
1985	Joshua Then and Now	Eli Seligson	
1988	A New Life	Barry	
1992	Jack and His Friends	Tom	
1996	The First Wives Club	'A Certain Age' Cast Member	
1997	Private Parts	Ross Buckingham	
2001	Down to Earth	Director	
2005	Trust the Man	Amis	
2008	Vote and Die: Liszt for President	William H. 'Cuppy' Brazzelton III	
2009	My Dog Tulip	Army Veterinarian	Voice

=== Television ===
Year	Title	Role	Notes
1970	Neither Are We Enemies	Centurion	Television film
1972	NET Playhouse	Henry	Episode: "Harriet"
1973	Pueblo	Lt. S.R. Harris	Television film
1975	The Impostor	Joe Tyler	Television film
1975	Starsky & Hutch	D.A. Coleman	Episode: "Death Ride"
1975	Fear on Trial	Paul	Television film
1975	The Last of the Mohicans	Duncan Heyward	Television film
1976	The Adams Chronicles	Jay Gould	2 episodes
1976	Street Killing	District Attorney Carelli	Television film
1976	The Savage Bees	Dr. Rufus Carter	Television film
1976	Hawaii Five-O	Varna	Episode: "Yes, My Deadly Daughter"
1977	Lucan	Miklos	Episode: "Listen to the Heart Beat"
1980	OHMS	Thomas Eichen	Television film
1981	Family Reunion	Vernon Markham	Television film
1982	Another World	Nikolai Pirenko	Episode dated 13 April 1982
1982	Remington Steele	Ashley Feldman	Episode: "Steele Trap"
1983	Loving Friends and Perfect Couples	Mark	Episode dated 4 January 1983
1983	ABC Weekend Special	Mr. Wilson	Episode: "The Haunted Mansion Mystery"
1983	Running Out	Michel Genet	Television film
1983	Tucker's Witch	Stefan Kubler	Episode: "Psych-Out"
1984	Miami Vice	Sam Kovics	Episode: "Heart of Darkness"
1984–1989	Kate & Allie	Charles Lowell	10 episodes
1986	Philip Marlowe, Private Eye	Marty Estel	Episode: "Trouble Is My Business"
1986	Danger Bay	Phil Nadeau	Episode: "Pressure Point"
1987	I'll Take Manhattan	Pavka Mayer	2 episodes
1987	One Life to Live	Dr. Hoffman	Episode #1.4744
1989	True Blue	Commissioner	Episode: "Pilot: Part 1"
1990	Street Legal	Paulo DePalma	Episode: "Godfather of Mimico"
1990	Top Cops	Gregory Jaglowski	Episode: "Gregory Jaglowski"
1991	Tropical Heat	James Dunford	Episode: "Winter Wrong"
1991–2005	Law & Order	Various roles	7 episodes
1992–1995	As the World Turns	Alexander Cabot	6 episodes
1993	Ghostwriter	TV Announcer	Episode: "Who's Who: Part 1"
1993	With Hostile Intent	Chief Darnell	Television film
1994	Janek: The Silent Betrayal	Van Dorn	Television film
1994–1995	Side Effects	Dr. Knelman	3 episodes
1998	Naked City: A Killer Christmas	Kosinski	Television film
1999	Rembrandt: Fathers & Sons	Menasseh Ben Israel	Television film
1999	Law & Order: Special Victims Unit	Robert Sidarksy	Episode: "A Single Life"
1999	Dear America: Dreams in the Golden Country	Papa	Television film
2002	The Associates	Paul Mason	Episode: "Winner Take All"
2002	Last Call	Samuel Kroll	Television film
2002	Courage the Cowardly Dog	Voice	13 episodes
2002	Scar Tissue	Alex Nevsky	Television film
2004	Queer as Folk	Fenderman	Episode: "Proposal of Two Kinds"
2010	Who Is Clark Rockefeller?	Attorney	Television film
