= Robert Dryden =

American actor

- Born: February 8, 1917
- Died: December 16, 2003 (aged 86)
- Occupation: Actor

Robert Dryden (February 8, 1917 – December 16, 2003) was an American actor and voice-over performer "whose acting career spanned over four decades of radio, television, theater, and film appearances."

== Radio ==
Dryden played Sergeant Maggio in Call the Police, He also was active on The FBI in Peace and War, The Shadow, The Fat Man, Big Town, Gang Busters, The Adventures of Superman, and much later, CBS Radio Mystery Theater" and The General Mills Radio Adventure Theater.

== Television ==
He appeared in several television programs as well, including Naked City, The Web, Route 66, and Saturday Night Live.

== Filmography ==
- Four Boys and a Gun (1957) - Joe Barton
- For a Few Dollars More (1965) - Old Prophet (voice, uncredited)
- Taking Off (1971) - Dr. Bronson
- Man on a Swing (1974) - Mr. Dawson
- Fore Play (1975) - Pharmacist
- The Happy Hooker (1975) - Mr. Gordon
