= Himan Brown =

American radio and television program producer (1910–2010)

- Brown directing Betty Winkler and Frank Lovejoy in The Right To Live, May 18, 1947
- Born: July 21, 1910
- Died: June 4, 2010 (aged 99); New York, New York
- Other name: Hi Brown
- Education: Brooklyn College; Brooklyn Law School
- Occupation: Radio producer
- Known for: Producing for major networks and syndication

Himan Brown (July 21, 1910 – June 4, 2010), also known as Hi Brown, was an American producer of radio and television programs. Over seven decades, Brown produced and directed more than 30,000 radio shows, for all of the major radio networks and syndication. He worked with such actors as Helen Hayes, Boris Karloff, Peter Lorre, Gregory Peck, Frank Sinatra and Orson Welles.

A recipient of the American Broadcast Pioneer and Peabody Awards, Brown was inducted in 1990 into the National Radio Hall of Fame.

== Early life ==
The son of a tailor from a shtetl near the Ukrainian seaport of Odesa, Brown first learned about radio from a shop teacher at Brooklyn's Boys High School. At the age of 18, he began broadcasting on New York's WEAF, reading newspapers with a Yiddish dialect. One of his listeners was Gertrude Berg, who wanted him to play Jake, her husband on The Goldbergs, which he did for six months. He continued as a radio actor but soon began to pitch shows directly to advertising agencies.

While at Brooklyn College, he recruited fellow student Irwin Shaw to write scripts, giving the author his first paid writing job. Shaw later based a character on Brown in his 1951 novel about the radio industry, The Troubled Air. In 1931, he earned a bachelor of arts degree from Brooklyn College and a law degree from Brooklyn Law School, where he was valedictorian.

== On the air ==
Over a 65 year period, Brown produced more than 30,000 radio programs, including The Adventures of the Thin Man, The Affairs of Peter Salem, Bulldog Drummond, CBS Radio Mystery Theater, City Desk, Dick Tracy, Flash Gordon, The General Mills Radio Adventure Theater, Grand Central Station, Green Valley, USA, The Gumps, Inner Sanctum Mysteries, Joyce Jordan, M.D., Marie, the Little French Princess, The NBC Radio Theater, The Private Files of Rex Saunders, Terry and the Pirates and numerous daytime soap operas. During World War II, he worked with the Writers' War Board, producing patriotic serials to aid the war effort.

Brown directed many episodes of shows he produced. In 1951–55, he directed the NBC detective drama, Barrie Craig, Confidential Investigator.

In the 1950s, he bought Adolph Zukor's Famous Players Studios at 221 West 26th Street (now Chelsea Studios) to produce his shows.

When television arrived, Brown produced 26 episodes of the syndicated Inner Sanctum TV series, plus a daytime show, Morning Matinee. Realizing that "all these guys making TV, they have to have a set," he profited by acquiring the studios in Chelsea; they were used for 35 years by New York TV production firms.

Through his non-profit educational foundation, Brown produced They Were Giants, radio programs dramatizing the lives of such literary figures as Walt Whitman and H. G. Wells, and We, The Living, fact-based dramas about the lives of senior citizens.

Brown also taught audio drama at Brooklyn College and the School of Visual Arts.

== Personal life ==
In 1938, Brown moved to a ten-room apartment at 285 Central Park West, where he would live the rest of his life.

Brown had two children, Barry Kenneth Brown and Hilda Joan Brown, two grandchildren, and four great-grandchildren.

Hi Brown’s second marriage was with Shirley Goodman who was the President of the Fashion Institute of Technology in New York City.

Brown died on June 4, 2010.

== Legacy ==
Brown's legacy lives on in the Himan Brown Charitable Trust, which has endowed a Senior Program at the 92nd Street Y in New York City. He also has an archive of his work at the University of Georgia.
