= List of CBS Radio Mystery Theater episodes (1982 season) =

Season of American radio series

This is an episode list for the 1982 season of the radio drama series CBS Radio Mystery Theater. The series premiered on CBS on January 6, 1974, and ended on December 31, 1982. A set of 1,399 original episodes aired between January 1974 and December 1982. The series was broadcast every day of the week for the first six years with re-runs filling in empty slots starting in February 1974. All episodes are available free at the Internet Archive.

== List of episodes ==
Episode list	# of episodes
List of CBS Radio Mystery Theater episodes (1974 season)	193
List of CBS Radio Mystery Theater episodes (1975 season)	212
List of CBS Radio Mystery Theater episodes (1976 season)	170
List of CBS Radio Mystery Theater episodes (1977 season)	186
List of CBS Radio Mystery Theater episodes (1978 season)	176
List of CBS Radio Mystery Theater episodes (1979 season)	106
List of CBS Radio Mystery Theater episodes (1980 season)	97
List of CBS Radio Mystery Theater episodes (1981 season)	132
List of CBS Radio Mystery Theater episodes (1982 season)	127

== 1982 episodes ==
=== January ===
No. overall	No. in season	Title	Directed by	Written by	Original release date
1273	1	"The Acquisition"	Himan Brown	Sam Dann	January 4, 1982
A wealthy financier is marooned on a remote island, where his financial prowess means nothing to the natives who force him into slavery. Starring: Tony Roberts
1274	2	"The Last Orbit"	Himan Brown	Douglas Dempsey	January 8, 1982
An astronaut is plagued by visions of a strange woman who claims to be from another planet, and is surprised when she shows up in the flesh aboard his ship. Starring: Larry Haines, Marian Seldes
1275	3	"Les Misérables, Part I: The Thief and the Bishop"	Himan Brown	Gerald Keane	January 11, 1982
An adaptation of Victor Hugo's novel begins with Jean Valjean discovering no one will aid him after he finished a 19-year prison sentence (for stealing a loaf of bread). Then he meets a bishop who tries to help guide him on the straight and narrow. Starring: Alexander Scourby, Bernard Grant
1276	4	"Les Misérables, Part II: The Lawless and the Law"	Himan Brown	Gerald Keane	January 12, 1982
Jean's lot in life improves as a factory owner, but he must deal with a police inspector, Javert, suspicious of his success, as well as a promise to a dying woman to find her missing daughter, Collette. Starring: Bernard Grant, Alexander Scourby, Teri Keane, Russell Horton, Earl Hammond
1277	5	"Les Misérables, Part III: No Escape"	Himan Brown	Gerald Keane	January 13, 1982
Valjean escapes Javert's pursuit and finds Collette in a monastery, where he tells her of her past. Starring: Bernard Grant, Alexander Scourby
1278	6	"Les Misérables, Part IV: Fear, Love and Death"	Himan Brown	Gerald Keane	January 14, 1982
Javert escapes a trap but finds himself in the middle of the French Revolution; Collette finds a secret love; and Inspector Javert's situation takes an ugly turn. Starring: Bernard Grant, Alexander Scourby, Amanda Plummer
1279	7	"Les Misérables, Part V: The Final Chapter"	Himan Brown	Gerald Keane	January 15, 1982
Valjean and his friends take refuge and find an ally in the sewers of Paris, where a destined final showdown with Inspector Javert takes place. Starring: Alexander Scourby, Bernard Grant
1280	8	"The Real World"	Himan Brown	Sam Dann	January 19, 1982
Despite her superiors telling her that the perpetrators are wealthy and untouchable, a police detective is determined to seek justice for a murdered exotic dancer. Starring: Joyce Gordon
1281	9	"Gate 27"	Himan Brown	Sam Dann	January 21, 1982
An ex-detective turns to the bottle after his wife deserts him, but receives inspiration from a young woman on a commuter train. When the woman disappears and he has dreams of her calling out to him, he resurrects his old deductive skills to find her. Starring: Fred Gwynne, Teri Keane
1282	10	"To Be an Empress"	Himan Brown	James Agate, Jr.	January 26, 1982
The story of the struggles of Catherine the Great and her rise from minor French aristocracy to the Russian throne. Starring: Amanda Plummer
1283	11	"Dickens of Scotland Yard"	Himan Brown	James Agate, Jr.	January 28, 1982
Scotland Yard enlists the famous writer Charles Dickens to help with an investigation involving a con artist, a cheating spouse, and prized horses. Starring: Paul Hecht; Note: Last original Mystery Theater episode with E. G. Marshall as host

=== February ===
No. overall	No. in season	Title	Directed by	Written by	Original release date
1284	12	"The Good Ship Aud"	Himan Brown	Sam Dann	February 1, 1982
A graphic telling of the story of Sir Roger Casement, who was celebrated for his patriotism and diplomatic service to Great Britain, only to be hanged for treason. Starring: Earl Hammond; Note: Tammy Grimes' first episode as Mystery Theater host
1285	13	"The Mysterious Slumber"	Himan Brown	Elspeth Eric	February 3, 1982
Mary Reynolds awakens one morning with a brand new, sweet-natured personality... and no memory of who she was before or of her family, who are amazed by her change in temperament. Starring: Diana Kirkwood, Elspeth Eric
1286	14	"The Cantankerous Ghost"	Himan Brown	Bob Juhren	February 5, 1982
A pair of elderly sisters are spared foreclosure when a Hollywood director rents their mansion to use as the set for his new horror movie. But when the spirit of an old relative disrupts the film crew, the sisters must try to stop it before things go further awry. Starring: Marian Seldes, Evie Juster
1287	15	"Change of Heart"	Himan Brown	Sam Dann	February 8, 1982
A business magnate is rushed into emergency surgery and has an ailing heart valve replaced with one from a swine; the porcine-like behavior he exhibits afterwards gives new meaning to what his ex-fiancée called him — a "pig" — when she broke off their engagement days before his hospitalization. Starring: Louis Turenne, Patricia Elliott, Sam Gray, Joan Shay
1288	16	"The Sand Castle"	Himan Brown	Elspeth Eric	February 10, 1982
Childhood trauma causes a young woman to obsessively build sand castles every day on the beach — a compulsion that lasts well into her adulthood. Starring: Norman Rose, Jada Rowland, Gordon Gould, Teri Keane
1289	17	"The Bargain"	Himan Brown	James Agate, Jr.	February 12, 1982
Deep in debt to gamblers, a race car mechanic sabotages driver Pete Marvin's car in order to fix a race. The resulting near-fatal crash leads Pete to walk away from racing and propose marriage to his girlfriend — something the mechanic does not want to see happen by any means. Starring: Mandel Kramer, Russell Horton, Tracy Ellis, Robert Kaliban, Ray Owens
1290	18	"The .44 Connection"	Himan Brown	Sam Dann	February 15, 1982
Incensed after being laid off due to her advancing age, a secretary challenges her ex-boss to a duel with antique .44-caliber revolvers — and wins. Starring: Marian Seldes
1291	19	"The Washington Kidnap"	Himan Brown	G. Frederick Lewis	February 17, 1982
While jailed for currency counterfeiting, two convicts become wrapped up in a Tory attempt to kidnap George Washington and try him for treason against Great Britain. Starring: Paul Hecht, Robert Kaliban
1292	20	"The Victim"	Himan Brown	Bryce Walton	February 19, 1982
Flimsy evidence helps a hotshot lawyer overturn Joe Thompson's conviction for murder and win his client $2 million in damages; it leads Joe — and the prosecution's main witness — to take off on a celebratory trip to Acapulco. Starring: John Lithgow, Earl Hammond, Russell Horton, Teri Keane
1293	21	"Nickels and Dimes"	Himan Brown	Sam Dann	February 22, 1982
An undercover police officer becomes so adept in infiltrating a crime organization that he becomes its heir apparent — an arrangement that makes being a plain ol' cop dull by comparison. Starring: Michael Tolan
1294	22	"Invaders from Atlantis"	Himan Brown	G. Frederick Lewis	February 24, 1982
With Earth's major cities under their control, an invading alien race sends agents to smaller towns. In one such hamlet, Parson's Corner, an agent gains the townsfolk's cooperation, but just as easily falls under the romantic sway of a local schoolteacher. Starring: Arnold Moss, Don Scardino, Court Benson, Evie Juster
1295	23	"The Blood Red Ink"	Himan Brown	Sidney Sloan	February 26, 1982
Resentful after being overlooked for a promotion (one that his partner receives), a veteran policeman becomes a dirty cop on the take. Starring: Fred Gwynne

=== March ===
No. overall	No. in season	Title	Directed by	Written by	Original release date
1296	24	"The Blue Sedan"	Himan Brown	Sam Dann	March 1, 1982
The titular vehicle is an intrepid police lieutenant's only clue in the murder of a sleazy private eye. Starring: Kim Hunter
1297	25	"Death Star"	Himan Brown	Sam Dann	March 3, 1982
A successful businesswoman finds herself lapsing into the memory of a woman from the 16th century... whose husband was executed at the hands of the man who is now a magazine stand operator. Starring: Marian Seldes, Russell Horton
1298	26	"Death at a Distance"	Himan Brown	Elspeth Eric	March 5, 1982
A missionary doctor seeks help with a patient who's convinced that he'll die by voodoo... but help is hard to find from the most prominent doctor in the area, who fears the black arts as well. Starring: Norman Rose
1299	27	"First Impressions"	Himan Brown	Victoria Dann	March 8, 1982
A woman is being extradited for skipping bail on her husband's murder. As they travel, she pleads her innocence to the police detective who apprehended her... and after noticing several inconsistencies in evidence, he believes her. Starring: Teri Keane, Mandel Kramer, Carol Teitel
1300	28	"The Heart of Boadicea"	Himan Brown	Sam Dann	March 10, 1982
Robbed of her rightful throne after her husband's death, a queen must weigh the possibilities of how and when to fight for her crown while also safeguarding the lives of her subjects. Starring: Marian Seldes
1301	29	"The New Man at the Yard"	Himan Brown	G. Frederick Lewis	March 12, 1982
In 1860, Scotland Yard enlists Charles Dickens' services to help unravel whether a mysterious death was murder or suicide. Starring: Paul Hecht
1302	30	"The Face of the Waters"	Himan Brown	G. Frederick Lewis	March 15, 1982
In turn-of-the-century Louisiana, a man develops an unhealthy attraction to his niece and ward, and competes for her affections with the family chauffeur, an aspiring medical student. Starring: Paul Hecht, Norman Rose
1303	31	"Tippecanoe and Tyler, Too"	Himan Brown	Sam Dann	March 17, 1982
A furniture maker in his 60s plans to marry an assistant 30 years his junior, but his friend and neighbor tries to prove the bride has dastardly intentions. Starring: Carol Teitel, Cynthia Harris
1304	32	"The Magic Stick of Manitu"	Himan Brown	Victoria Dann	March 19, 1982
An interstellar diplomat and her superior tries to establish relations with a distant planet whose primary resource is music, sounds the diplomat finds enchanting but her boss sees as only an avenue to exploit the planet's resources. Starring: Keir Dullea, Fred Gwynne, Marian Seldes, Sam Gray
1305	33	"The Tool Shed"	Himan Brown	G. Frederick Lewis	March 22, 1982
A London newspaper reporter visits the countryside residence of a writer of occult-themed works, encounters his eccentric household, and discovers mysterious sketches in the "playroom" of the author's son. Starring: John Vickery, Bernard Grant, Evie Juster; Adapted from a story by Henry James
1306	34	"The Old Country"	Himan Brown	Sam Dann	March 24, 1982
A corporate strategic planner heads to his company's Russian office, but inadvertently travels back to the time of his parents' birth... and learns first-hand of their dark past. Starring: Paul Hecht
1307	35	"In the Cards"	Himan Brown	G. Frederick Lewis	March 26, 1982
A telling of the life of Empress Joséphine, her obsession with the esoteric arts, and her manipulation of Napoleon Bonaparte. Starring: Tammy Grimes (as Joséphine), Teri Keane, Louis Turenne, Earl Hammond
1308	36	"On the Night of the Dead"	Himan Brown	Arnold Moss	March 29, 1982
The women on a Greek island ravaged by disease and famine believe they've found salvation in a man who claims to be a god; it's an assertion the island's governor disbelieves. Starring: John Vickery, Marian Seldes, Earl Hammond, Tracy Ellis
1309	37	"I Am the Killer"	Himan Brown	Sam Dann	March 31, 1982
At a hospital in the 19th century, the head of obstetrics wonders why there's a high fatality rate of women giving birth in his ward, an issue that's not prominent among births handled by midwives in another ward. Starring: Keir Dullea, Lloyd Battista, Mandel Kramer, Evie Juster

=== April ===
No. overall	No. in season	Title	Directed by	Written by	Original release date
1310	38	"The Naval Treaty"	Himan Brown	Murray Burnett	April 2, 1982
Sherlock Holmes is lured out of retirement to aid a young British diplomat who, in an unguarded moment, allowed a top-secret multinational treaty to go stolen. Starring: Gordon Gould; Adapted from Arthur Conan Doyle's "The Adventure of the Naval Treaty"
1311	39	"Widow Wonderland"	Himan Brown	Steve Lehrman	April 5, 1982
The story of a cad who makes a living off of meeting, seducing, and fleecing the money of grieving women visiting their dead husbands' graves. Starring: Elspeth Eric, Fred Gwynne, Evie Juster, Earl Hammond
1312	40	"Only a Woman"	Himan Brown	Sam Dann	April 7, 1982
The self-proclaimed daughter of the Syrian god Dagon recounts how she brought down several men who underestimated her. Starring: Russell Horton, Marian Seldes
1313	41	"You Tell Me Your Dream"	Himan Brown	Mary Renwick	April 9, 1982
Two men who do not know each other realize they've been having the same recurring nightmare of being viciously attacked by a killer without a face. Starring: Michael Tolan, Robert Dryden
1314	42	"His Fourth Wife"	Himan Brown	Sam Dann	April 12, 1982
A painter is commissioned to create a portrait of a prospective bride of Henry VIII... and must decide how to depict the woman since the British monarch hasn't yet laid eyes upon her. Starring: Russell Horton, Norman Rose, Earl Hammond, Carol Teitel
1315	43	"The Visions of Sir Philip Sidney"	Himan Brown	G. Frederick Lewis	April 14, 1982
A Zulu War veteran in 19th century London finds he is the only one who has visions of people on a train, but he can't determine if they are real or the byproduct of shell shock. Starring: Lee Richardson; Adapted from a story by M. R. James
1316	44	"Something to Live For"	Himan Brown	Karen Thorsen	April 16, 1982
A retired police detective stops an immigrant shop owner from killing himself, then helps him on a dangerous investigation to find who has branded him for insurance fraud. Starring: Fred Gwynne, Earl Hammond
1317	45	"Shelter"	Himan Brown	Henry Slesar	April 19, 1982
A man, his wife, and her lover meet to have a frank discussion about their relationship... a conversation that is forced to go longer than they had hoped when world events cause a nuclear war. Starring: Ralph Bell, Evelyn Juster, Don Scardino, Robert Kaliban
1318	46	"The Jataka"	Himan Brown	Sam Dann	April 21, 1982
A guest lecturer at Delhi University is invited to the mansion of her mentor, who is translating tales about the births of Gautama Buddha; but she becomes suspicious when she discovers him missing and his servants give varying reasons as to why. Starring: Marian Seldes
1319	47	"The Whimpering Pond"	Himan Brown	Roy Winsor	April 23, 1982
A novelist is houseguest to old friends at a country estate, where he witnesses what may be the apparition of a distant relative who went missing on the property seven years earlier. Starring: Norman Rose, Mandel Kramer
1320	48	"The Hanging Sheriff"	Himan Brown	Bryce Walton	April 26, 1982
A small-town sheriff has problems imposing the death penalty on a drifting salesman who accidentally killed someone — a death the townsfolk, and the sheriff's wife, think was intentional. Starring: Fred Gwynne, Elspeth Eric, Bernard Grant, Russell Horton
1321	49	"The Ghost of Andersonville"	Himan Brown	James Agate, Jr.	April 28, 1982
A Union soldier released from the Confederacy's most infamous prison camp is asked to meet the Union general whose error led to his incarceration. But the soldier is soon thrust back into prison irons when the general is found dead, a victim of apparent foul play. Starring: Tony Roberts, Robert Kaliban
1322	50	"The Last Duel"	Himan Brown	James Agate, Jr.	April 30, 1982
A British forces lieutenant in Colonial India is labeled a coward by his colleagues when he backs down from a duel. He may instead be waiting to finish a much older score. Starring: Lee Richardson; Based on Alexander Pushkin's short story "The Shot"

=== May ===
No. overall	No. in season	Title	Directed by	Written by	Original release date
1323	51	"Guilty As Charged"	Himan Brown	G. Frederick Lewis	May 3, 1982
A hardware salesman must rely on a polygraph test after being charged for a series of crimes he did not commit, even though he perfectly matches the suspect's description. Starring: Michael Tolan
1324	52	"Dreamers and Killers"	Himan Brown	Sam Dann	May 5, 1982
A woman becomes disturbed by how the brushes with death her ex-fiancé is experiencing closely resemble the nightmares she is having. Starring: Marian Seldes
1325	53	"The Wedding Present"	Himan Brown	Sam Dann	May 7, 1982
The Balkans, c. 1912: A pair of swindlers enlist the services of an American painter in an effort to pull off "the con of the century" against a ruling monarch... who may be as much a swindler as they are. Starring: Ralph Bell, Earl Hammond, Patricia Elliott
1326	54	"Tourist Trap"	Himan Brown	Douglas Dempsey	May 10, 1982
An accident on their way to a vacation spot waylays Harry & Ruth Meacher in the village of Downville, where they suspect the mechanic is intentionally taking way too long to fix their car. But auto repairs may not be the only reason Fate has led the couple to this out-of-the-way town. Starring: Paul Hecht, Teri Keane, Earl Hammond, Evie Juster
1327	55	"The Wound That Would Not Heal"	Himan Brown	Sidney Sloan	May 12, 1982
A man is adamant that he did not murder his mistress. But when her ghost begins to haunt him in his dreams, he begins to think the accusation must be true. Starring: Ralph Bell, Cynthia Adler, Bernard Grant
1328	56	"The Hills of Arias"	Himan Brown	Sam Dann	May 14, 1982
Years ago, revolutionist Francisco Canoyas escaped a rising dictatorship in his native Central American homeland. Though he's now content as a U.S. college professor, Canoyas' godson encourages him to return home and lead a resurgence... and the spirits of those he fought alongside are in agreement. Starring: Mandel Kramer
1329	57	"The Imperfect Crime"	Himan Brown	James Agate, Jr.	May 17, 1982
Completing a report on the hit-and-run death of a wealthy socialite is anything but routine for a police detective when he discovers that it's not only a murder, but that the deceased is an ex-flame. Starring: Russell Horton, Carol Teitel, Robert Dryden
1330	58	"The Brooch"	Himan Brown	G. Frederick Lewis	May 19, 1982
A governess signs on to school the children of a wealthy yet eccentric couple... and is subject to a series of bizarre situations and accusations. Starring: Paul Hecht, Patricia Elliott; Based on a story by Anton Chekov
1331	59	"The Different People"	Himan Brown	Arnold Moss	May 21, 1982
A modern-day anthropologist investigates the whereabouts of American Civil War veterans named in a letter from the 1860s; the correspondence suggests that they may have discovered the secret of immortality. Starring: Kristoffer Tabori, Jada Rowland, Russell Horton, Arnold Moss
1332	60	"Your Desires, My Guilt"	Himan Brown	Sam Dann	May 24, 1982
A couple of modest income discovers they can have whatever they desire by wishing for it together. But they soon learn their gift has a downside when they abuse it to correct perceived wrongs. Starring: Norman Rose, Elspeth Eric, Marian Seldes
1333	61	"Why Is This Lady Smiling?"	Himan Brown	Sam Dann	May 26, 1982
In 1498 Italy, Leonardo da Vinci is commissioned to paint the image of a silk merchant's wife; but just the altering of the subject's smile leads to a masterpiece — and breeds envy in her husband. Starring: John Vickery, Diana Kirkwood, Bernard Grant
1334	62	"The Chess Master"	Himan Brown	Murray Burnett	May 28, 1982
A game of chess in the park with a stranger leads an unemployed advertising agent into a world of adventure... and of good luck. Starring: Paul Hecht, Fred Gwynne
1335	63	"Lady MacBeth at the Zoo"	Himan Brown	Sam Dann	May 31, 1982
Waldo is determined to stop a murder scheme involving a man, his girlfriend, and his uncle. The problem is that Waldo is a monkey in a zoo's jungle habitat, and he can't get any human to learn of the plot he overheard. Starring: Larry Haines

=== June ===
No. overall	No. in season	Title	Directed by	Written by	Original release date
1336	64	"Two Times Dead"	Himan Brown	Sam Dann	June 2, 1982
Based on a true story, this episode involves a reporter who interviews a man who frames himself for a murder — his own! Starring: Lloyd Battista, Bernard Grant, Ray Owens, Carol Teitel
1337	65	"My First Rogue"	Himan Brown	G. Frederick Lewis	June 4, 1982
A dangerous cat-and-mouse game between a French detective and a sophisticated art thief, who has taken credit for stealing a series of priceless objects despite being locked up in jail. Starring: Lee Richardson, Bob Kaliban; Adapted from a story by Maurice Leblanc
1338	66	"The Woman Who Wanted to Live"	Himan Brown	Bryce Walton	June 14, 1982
A convicted felon kills a prison guard and escapes from a maximum security facility. But there's a witness, a young blonde woman who convinces the felon not to kill her and instead take her along as a traveling companion. Starring: Larry Haines, Roberta Maxwell
1339	67	"A Most Dangerous Animal"	Himan Brown	Sidney Sloan	June 16, 1982
In order to marry the man she loves, the wife of notorious boxer "Tiger" Vincent asks for a divorce. Tiger denies the request, and instead brutally assaults his wife's lover. But Tiger gets his comeuppance in the ring against a reigning champion. Starring: Fred Gwynne, Teri Keane, Mandel Kramer, Robert Dryden
1340	68	"The Fifth Man"	Himan Brown	James Agate, Jr.	June 18, 1982
A writer for a British aviation magazine joins in on a secret mission to ferret out communist spies in the aviation industry. Starring: Norman Rose
1341	69	"Universe Hollow"	Himan Brown	Sam Dann	June 21, 1982
After her journalistic credibility is severely damaged, newspaper reporter Sheila Rogan is sent to the titular town to cover claims of encounters with extraterrestrial life. While Rogan hopes discrediting the claims will help polish her reputation, she faces a difficult life choice when she learns they appear to be true. Starring: Patricia Elliott
1342	70	"Matching Chairs"	Himan Brown	Elspeth Eric	June 23, 1982
The rivalry of two brothers comes to a head when the younger and more immature of the siblings claims that one of a matching set of heirloom chairs has the power to kill. Starring: Kristoffer Tabori, Paul Hecht
1343	71	"Don't Kill Me"	Himan Brown	Sam Dann	June 25, 1982
Wilma allows husband George to die from sickness so that she can marry his wealthy friend Ted... only to become a medical invalid just as George had been. Starring: Tony Roberts, Roberta Maxwell, Lee Richardson, Joan Shay
1344	72	"Escape to Prison"	Himan Brown	Sam Dann	June 28, 1982
Cosmetics executive Elizabeth Marlowe firmly contends that her husband, Woodrow, is alive... and believes her colleagues, friends, and even her psychiatrist have erected a conspiracy to tell her that Woodrow has been dead for five years. Seeking proof that she's right, Elizabeth asks a police detective for help. Starring: Marian Seldes, Earl Hammond, Evie Juster, Bernard Grant
1345	73	"Killer Crab"	Himan Brown	James Agate, Jr.	June 30, 1982
The story of a "down to Earth" guy living on another planet, his estranged wife, and a robotic weapon named K.C. that is his hope for salvation, rescue... and revenge. Starring: Russell Horton, Ann Williams

=== July ===
No. overall	No. in season	Title	Directed by	Written by	Original release date
1346	74	"Bring Back My Body"	Himan Brown	Sam Dann	July 2, 1982
A woman with a split personality blacks out and goes on a vindictive rampage against a man she has never heard of; a psychologist believes a book from her past may be key to reconciling her behavior. Starring: Kim Hunter
1347	75	"The Romance of Mary Oates"	Himan Brown	Bob Juhren	July 5, 1982
After finally finding romance, a lonely 40-year-old secretary finds more than she bargained for in her new lover. Starring: Roberta Maxwell
1348	76	"Code Word: Caprice"	Himan Brown	Roy Winsor	July 7, 1982
An honest, hard-working truck driver is tapped by police to crack a hijacking ring. Starring: Bernard Grant, Lloyd Battista
1349	77	"Come Back Next Week"	Himan Brown	Sam Dann	July 9, 1982
A persistent Emma Dawson makes weekly trips a state penitentiary to ask hitman Robert 'Boomer' Cavell who hired him to kill her husband. Initially rebuffing her visits, Cavell eventually encourages her to think less about who hired him and more about why he was hired. Dawson does so... and learns of the secrets her husband kept close to his vest. Starring: Teri Keane, Fred Gwynne
1350	78	"The Hand of Amnesia"	Himan Brown	G. Frederick Lewis	July 12, 1982
A young short-order cook, despite being married to a wealthy widow, keeps a girlfriend on the side. When his wife finds out, she throws him out. But when she turns up missing, he's considered a suspect. Starring: Ralph Bell
1351	79	"The Innocent Murderer"	Himan Brown	James Agate, Jr.	July 14, 1982
The story of John Surratt, accused conspirator in the assassination of Abraham Lincoln, as he flees from eastern Canada to Liverpool, England to avoid capture and prosecution. Starring: Tony Roberts
1352	80	"The Great Catherine"	Himan Brown	G. Frederick Lewis	July 16, 1982
The German-born Russian Czarina Catherine the Great works to modernize her country while falling in love with a military hero from a rural commoner's background. Starring: Tammy Grimes, Russell Horton, Earl Hammond, Bernard Grant
1353	81	"Formula Z — The Protector"	Himan Brown	Sam Dann	July 20, 1982
Formula Z is the main ingredient in an ink law enforcement uses for fingerprinting suspects, as well as the main focus in a game of international intrigue and espionage. Starring: Patricia Elliott, Mandel Kramer, Ray Owens, Evie Juster
1354	82	"Yearbook"	Himan Brown	Douglas Dempsey	July 22, 1982
After believing she saw someone stash a body inside a car trunk, a reclusive widow turns to an old high school yearbook for clues. Starring: Evie Juster
1355	83	"Adolph and Eva"	Himan Brown	James Agate, Jr.	July 27, 1982
Eva Braun recounts her final days with Hitler. Starring: Roberta Maxwell, Robert Dryden, Joan Shay, Louis Turenne
1356	84	"Mind Over Mind"	Himan Brown	Elspeth Eric	July 29, 1982
A young bank teller is questioned about her role in a bank robbery; despite a colleague claiming she cooperated with the thief, the teller adamantly states she had no involvement. Starring: Jada Rowland

=== August ===
No. overall	No. in season	Title	Directed by	Written by	Original release date
1357	85	"Redhead"	Himan Brown	Sam Dann	August 3, 1982
Seeking to assuage his guilt over dropping off a young woman at the wrong stop (which indirectly led to her murder), a bus driver uses his connections in the boxing world to solve the crime and catch the killer. Starring: Fred Gwynne, Carol Teitel, Mandel Kramer
1358	86	"Murder by Decree"	Himan Brown	James Agate, Jr.	August 5, 1982
The tragic tale of Anne Boleyn, second wife to England's King Henry VIII. Starring: Marian Seldes
1359	87	"A Pair of Green Eyes"	Himan Brown	Arnold Moss	August 10, 1982
The mystery of a powerful jewel that can turn a man into an immortal god envelops the case of an archeologist's death. Starring: Teri Keane, Arnold Moss, Russell Horton, Robert Kaliban
1360	88	"The Man with the X-Ray Eyes"	Himan Brown	Bryce Walton	August 12, 1982
A prosecutor with big political aspirations is assigned to a murder case and, much the county sheriff's chagrin, brings in a psychic to assist with the investigation. Starring: Court Benson, Fred Gwynne, Lloyd Battista
1361	89	"Famous Last Words"	Himan Brown	Sam Dann	August 17, 1982
A young professional reports seeing a dead body outside of a warehouse, but the corpse is nowhere to be found when police arrive. Still, she insists on pressing the issue even as she risks losing credibility with her employer. Starring: Kim Hunter
1362	90	"Eleanora"	Himan Brown	James Agate, Jr.	August 19, 1982
On her opening night as the lead role in Romeo & Juliet, a stage actress reminisces about her part in an equally tragic romance, one involving an activist in Berlin and a secret political society. Starring: Marian Seldes
1363	91	"Funeral Without a Corpse"	Himan Brown	Sidney Sloan	August 24, 1982
A district attorney succumbs to blackmail by a man threatening to expose a terrible secret that could put his marriage, his family, and his political aspirations in peril. Starring: Norman Rose
1364	92	"Barn Burner"	Himan Brown	Steve Lehrman	August 26, 1982
Two down-and-out thoroughbred owners pull off a chaotic swindle when they substitute ringers for their horses. Starring: Patricia Elliott, Russell Horton
1365	93	"How Do You Like Those Apples?"	Himan Brown	Sam Dann	August 31, 1982
A chance encounter with a psychic allows an unfaithful John Crosswell to learn of his death... while his wife, Louise, begins having nightmares of John's murder and aims to find the killer. Starring: Mandel Kramer, Carol Teitel

=== September ===
No. overall	No. in season	Title	Directed by	Written by	Original release date
1366	94	"The Rim of Eternity"	Himan Brown	Sam Dann	September 2, 1982
Down-and-out journalist Joe Morris is working as a disreputable community newspaper. In an attempt to regain his former prominence, Morris reviews the seemingly routine murder case of one of the town's most unsavory citizens, and winds up learning a lesson in human fallibility. Starring: Larry Haines
1367	95	"Scenes from a Murder"	Himan Brown	G. Frederick Lewis	September 7, 1982
Fyodor Dostoevsky's Crime and Punishment is the basis for this tale about a down-on-his-luck man who resorts to murder to remedy his financial problems, only to be tormented by self-guilt. Starring: Russell Horton
1368	96	"The Riddle"	Himan Brown	Karen Thorsen	September 9, 1982
Their purchase of an old camera and yellowed letters at an estate sale lead a married couple to an elderly woman, her decades-old tale of familial discord, and a cryptic hunt for a long-buried heirloom. Starring: Patricia Elliott, Lloyd Battista, Elspeth Eric
1369	97	"The Forbidden House"	Himan Brown	Elspeth Eric	September 14, 1982
"Please, don't make me leave... it is very important that I should stay here." A young couple welcome a traveling circus worker into the new home they are remodeling... and in due time learn the related secrets surrounding both him and their house. Starring: Tony Roberts, Diana Kirkwood, Bernard Grant, Robert Dryden
1370	98	"Two Sisters"	Himan Brown	Sam Dann	September 16, 1982
Complications arise when a shy woman is convinced to impersonate her more gregarious twin to win the affections of the handsome doctor they are both romantically pursuing. Starring: Marian Seldes, Patricia Elliott
1371	99	"The Way Station"	Himan Brown	G. Frederick Lewis	September 20, 1982
In 18th Century Europe, twin siblings learn something new about their gravedigger father when they accidentally overhear him talking to long-dead souls. Starring: Norman Rose, Bernard Grant, Russell Horton, Mia Dillon; Adapted from a story by Ferenc Molnár
1372	100	"Pursuit of a Dream"	Himan Brown	G. Frederick Lewis	September 22, 1982
A fascinating glimpse into the life of Madame Marie Curie as she unraveled the secrets of Radium. Starring: Carol Teitel
1373	101	"The Force of Evil"	Himan Brown	Roy Winsor	September 24, 1982
A young woman turns to witchcraft to exact revenge on her ex-lover when he decides to marry someone who's more intellectual than she is. Starring: Diana Kirkwood, Paul Hecht, Teri Keane, Court Benson, Mary Negro
1374	102	"Roll Call of the Dead"	Himan Brown	Arnold Moss	September 27, 1982
Despite their Apache guide discouraging them from doing so, two East Coast college students discovering the 1880s Wild West take a dangerous route... and encounter the supposedly dead members of an old exploring party. Starring: Russell Horton, Lloyd Battista
1375	103	"The Million Dollar Leg"	Himan Brown	Sam Dann	September 29, 1982
As a favor to an old teammate, an American collegiate football coach travels behind the Iron Curtain to recruit a kicker for the professional ranks. Starring: Tony Roberts

=== October ===
No. overall	No. in season	Title	Directed by	Written by	Original release date
1376	104	"Escape from Anzio"	Himan Brown	James Agate, Jr.	October 1, 1982
After he is shot down over occupied Italy in the heat of World War II, an Army pilot and his comrades must evade capture by German soldiers. Starring: Gordon Gould, Sam Gray, Cynthia Adler, Robert Kaliban
1377	105	"The Ninth Commandment"	Himan Brown	Sam Dann	October 4, 1982
A wealthy woman falls for the man who attempts to burgle her home; when he's arrested for murder, he refuses to use her as an alibi, lest he bring her dishonor. Starring: Teri Keane, Michael Tolan
1378	106	"The Abraham Lincoln Murder Trial"	Himan Brown	James Agate, Jr.	October 6, 1982
Abraham Lincoln defends a man wrongfully charged with murder in this story loosely based on Lincoln's early years as a circuit lawyer. Starring: Lloyd Battista, Patricia Elliott, Robert Dryden, Gordon Gould
1379	107	"The Pale Horse"	Himan Brown	Roy Winsor	October 8, 1982
A dying man briefly crosses into the afterlife, where he learns the secrets of the disease that's slowly killing him. Starring: Earl Hammond, Mandel Kramer
1380	108	"Tony's Market"	Himan Brown	Sam Dann	October 11, 1982
A senseless shooting at a convenience store is examined by looking at what the killer and his three victims were doing in the hours that led up to the crime. Starring: Earl Hammond, Joan Shay, Carol Teitel, Robert Kaliban, Arnold Moss
1381	109	"Fly Swatter"	Himan Brown	Sam Dann	October 13, 1982
Married pickpockets decide to go straight and take employment as butler and maid for an eccentric couple with a strange love of flies. Starring: Fred Gwynne, Evie Juster, Bernard Grant
1382	110	"The Flash Point"	Himan Brown	Sam Dann	October 15, 1982
An engineering executive begins to lose his memory from the trauma of being laid off; but as he begins a new life, old memories haunt him anew... and lead him to want revenge. Starring: Paul Hecht
1383	111	"Desert Maiden"	Himan Brown	Sam Dann	October 18, 1982
A middle-aged ad executive seeks inspiration for a perfume brand in the desert, where an old flame leads him on a journey of enlightenment. Starring: Mason Adams, Patricia Elliott
1384	112	"Last Days of a Dictator"	Himan Brown	G. Frederick Lewis	October 20, 1982
A recounting of the fall from power of Italian dictator Benito Mussolini during World War II. Starring: Bernard Grant, Earl Hammond
1385	113	"Three Fireflies in a Bottle"	Himan Brown	Nancy Moore	October 22, 1982
The lingering impact of child abuse permeates through this tale of a man reacquainting himself with a childhood friend; he claims his friend is an alien being... who has an ominous prediction for the human race. Starring: Russell Horton, Evie Juster, Cynthia Adler, Lloyd Battista
1386	114	"Resident Killer"	Himan Brown	Sam Dann	October 25, 1982
In a future where the human race has eradicated violence, a formerly brutal man's placid psychological programming is reversed — a necessity, really, as he has been tasked to fight off an alien invasion. Starring: Mason Adams
1387	115	"The Voice That Wouldn't Die"	Himan Brown	G. Frederick Lewis	October 27, 1982
Plaintive and mournful wails from a burned-out house on the Scottish moors haunt a family who have moved onto the property. Starring: Mia Dillon, Norman Rose, Bernard Grant, Earl Hammond
1388	116	"I Hate Harold"	Himan Brown	Henry Slesar	October 29, 1982
Jealous of a brash new sales manager, a meek-mannered jeweler's assistant is eager to help the police catch him in the act of stealing the company's prize collection. Starring: Larry Haines, Paul Hecht, Robert Dryden, Diana Kirkwood

=== November ===
No. overall	No. in season	Title	Directed by	Written by	Original release date
1389	117	"The Sensible Thing"	Himan Brown	Elspeth Eric	November 2, 1982
A widower decides to marry his assistant, but learns a few things about her, namely that she's incapable of giving love... and that she has a strong, unhealthy attachment to her dog. Starring: Lee Richardson, Teri Keane
1390	118	"The School Mistress"	Himan Brown	James Agate, Jr.	November 4, 1982
A beautiful teacher recalls how her torrid love affair sets pre-revolution Moscow aflutter... and ponders who may have caused her lover's death. Starring: Patricia Elliott; Adapted from a story by Anton Chekhov
1391	119	"Portrait of the Past"	Himan Brown	G. Frederick Lewis	November 9, 1982
The unusual coat of arms adorning an heirloom brooch leads a jeweler to a mystery surrounding his uncle, an 18-year-old girl, and the latter's unexplained death 50 years ago. Starring: Bob Kaliban, William Griffis, Carol Teitel
1392	120	"The Twelfth Juror"	Himan Brown	Sam Dann	November 11, 1982
A wealthy, scorned woman kills her married lover in a fit of jealous rage, then blackmails one of her employees into taking the rap. But the actions of one lone juror at the subsequent trial threatens the woman's plans to get away with her crime. Starring: Marian Seldes, Lloyd Battista, Mandel Kramer
1393	121	"The Magic Dust"	Himan Brown	Sam Dann	November 16, 1982
A metallurgist researches a mysterious metal-strengthening powder he learned about from his college professor 20 years ago. His industrialist boss offers big money for the ancient formula, but the professor sternly refuses, as she is sworn to keep it secret (upon pain of death). Starring: Tony Roberts, Arnold Ross, Evie Juster
1394	122	"Diamond Dotty"	Himan Brown	Sam Dann	November 18, 1982
A distraught woman arrives in a western frontier town in the 1880s, where she confesses to murdering two fugitives who killed her husband in an attempt to hijack their diamond mine. Starring: Teri Keane
1395	123	"The Smile"	Himan Brown	G. Frederick Lewis	November 23, 1982
"Whenever I see it, I feel as if it's draining my life away." A journalist tells his estranged wife that ever since he returned from an assignment in Tibet, a smile-shaped cloud has been following him... and has caused his health to deteriorate. Starring: Tony Roberts, Marian Seldes
1396	124	"The Reigate Mystery"	Himan Brown	Murray Burnett	November 25, 1982
While vacationing in Reigate, England, Dr. Watson and a very exhausted Sherlock Holmes are called on to solve a pair of identical burglaries that resulted in murder. Starring: Gordon Gould, William Griffis, Ray Owens, Lloyd Battista; Based on "The Reigate Squires" by Arthur Conan Doyle
1397	125	"The Goddess of Death"	Himan Brown	James Agate, Jr.	November 30, 1982
An acclaimed yet moody painter finds the perfect model for his painting of Aphrodite; the woman, in turn, has a profound impact on him — the same way she did on the other artists she's posed for. Starring: Diana Kirkwood, Mandel Kramer

=== December ===
No. overall	No. in season	Title	Directed by	Written by	Original release date
1398	126	"The Last Plan"	Himan Brown	Elspeth Eric	December 2, 1982
After a quarrelsome neighbor couple ask her to mediate their beef, an older neighbor woman hires a hitman to keep the peace between the two — and to make sure that if one spouse kills the other, both of them die. Starring: Elspeth Eric, Paul Hecht
1399	127	"The Boatman and the Devil"	Himan Brown	James Agate, Jr.	December 7, 1982
Despite discouragement from the "boatman" transporting him, a young Russian is determined to bring his family to help him bide time in Siberian exile. Starring: Alexander Scourby, Russell Horton, Earl Hammond, Marian Seldes; Adapted from a story by Anton Chekov

== Sources ==
- Payton, Gordon; Grams, Martin Jr. (January 1999), The CBS radio mystery theater: an episode guide and handbook to nine years of broadcasting, 1974-1982, McFarland & Company, Inc., ISBN 0-7864-0559-7
