= List of CBS Radio Mystery Theater episodes (1975 season) =

Season of American radio series

This is an episode list for the 1975 season of the radio drama series CBS Radio Mystery Theater. The series premiered on CBS on January 6, 1974, and ended on December 31, 1982. A set of 1,399 original episodes aired between January 1974 and December 1982. The series was broadcast every day of the week for the first six years with re-runs filling in empty slots starting in February 1974. All episodes are available free at the Internet Archive.

== List of Seasons ==
Season	# of episodes
List of CBS Radio Mystery Theater episodes (1974 season)	193
List of CBS Radio Mystery Theater episodes (1975 season)	212
List of CBS Radio Mystery Theater episodes (1976 season)	170
List of CBS Radio Mystery Theater episodes (1977 season)	186
List of CBS Radio Mystery Theater episodes (1978 season)	176
List of CBS Radio Mystery Theater episodes (1979 season)	106
List of CBS Radio Mystery Theater episodes (1980 season)	97
List of CBS Radio Mystery Theater episodes (1981 season)	132
List of CBS Radio Mystery Theater episodes (1982 season)	127

== Episodes ==
=== January ===
No. overall	No. in season	Title	Directed by	Written by	Original release date
194	1	"The Deadly Pearls"	Himan Brown	Elizabeth Pennell	January 1, 1975
A private detective goes undercover as a writer in a remote Hawaiian island to track a set of radioactive pearls that were used in two murders. Starring: Paul Hecht, Kate Reid, Grace Matthews, Court Benson
195	2	"The Reluctant Killer"	Himan Brown	Ian Martin	January 2, 1975
Disillusioned by the game's brutality, a football player quits the game, but becomes vengeful after his wife and mother-in-law unjustly accuse him of spousal abuse. Starring: Tony Roberts, Roberta Maxwell, Bryna Raeburn, Leon Janney, Ian Martin
196	3	"The Many Names of Death"	Himan Brown	Sam Dann	January 5, 1975
A bank's trust officer hires a secretary, who charms him into experiencing the wild side of life... an adventure that turns out wilder than he expected. Starring: Alexander Scourby, Lori March, William Redfield, Marian Hailey
197	4	"The Premature Burial"	Himan Brown	George Lowther	January 6, 1975
A physician assists his friend in exhuming the corpse of a recently deceased loved one; they find her alive, and now the evil husband she married wants her back. Starring: Keir Dullea, Paul Hecht, Guy Sorel, Marian Seldes; Note: The first of a week-long series of episodes adapted by Lowther from the works of Edgar Allan Poe (this episode was based on the same-named short story).
198	5	"The Murders in the Rue Morgue"	Himan Brown	George Lowther	January 7, 1975
A slow-thinking police detective seeks help in solving the case of a woman murdered in a locked room, and calls on a newbie who offers an unusual suggestion. Starring: Paul Hecht, Guy Sorel, Corinne Orr, Dan Ocko; Adapted from the short story by Edgar Allan Poe
199	6	"The Oblong Box"	Himan Brown	George Lowther	January 8, 1975
On a transatlantic cruise, Cornelius Wyatt brings with him a woman who's not his new wife, and a peculiar pine box that, as his college friend and his wife later learn, contains something more ghastly than the painting Cornelius insists it contains. Starring: Richard Mulligan, Bryna Raeburn, Grace Matthews, Court Benson; Adapted from the short story by Edgar Allan Poe
200	7	"Berenice"	Himan Brown	George Lowther	January 9, 1975
A man falls in love with the younger sister of his dying wife, who promises on her deathbed that her smile will haunt him to the point of insanity. Starring: Michael Tolan, Norman Rose, Joan Lovejoy, Roberta Maxwell; Adapted from the short story by Edgar Allan Poe
201	8	"The Masque of the Red Death"	Himan Brown	George Lowther	January 10, 1975
Set in 1996, this futuristic adaptation of Edgar Allan Poe's short story finds a wealthy old miser and his family staging a masquerade party at his mansion while a deadly plague ravages the outside world. But then a "guest" arrives wearing a bloody costume... Starring: Staats Cotsworth, Karl Swenson, Lois Smith, Jack Grimes, Evie Juster
202	9	"The Tell-Tale Heart"	Himan Brown	George Lowther	January 11, 1975
Edgar Allan Poe's short story is adapted to a rural setting, where a down-on-their-luck family are forced to live on the farm of the husband's sadistic, perverted uncle. Starring: Fred Gwynne, Ann Shepherd, Robert Dryden
203	10	"The Cask of Amontillado"	Himan Brown	George Lowther	January 12, 1975
After his wife is forced to spend the night with the lecherous banker he owes money to, a man seeks revenge by enticing the financier with an offer he can't resist. Starring: Richard Kiley, Robert Dryden, Frances Sternhagen, Roberta Maxwell, Leon Janney; Adapted from the short story by Edgar Allan Poe
204	11	"The Witness Is Death"	Himan Brown	Ian Martin	January 13, 1975
After being shot by the assassin and hospitalized, a witness to a gangland killing initially agrees to offer information to the police; but when he gets cold feet (out of fear of retaliation against him and his family), the cops and the hospital try an inventive way to get him to speak. Starring: Joan Shay, Ken Harvey, Ian Martin, Sam Gray
205	12	"Faith and the Faker"	Himan Brown	Elspeth Eric	January 14, 1975
A former con artist learns he has the power to heal his fellow island residents from their maladies... but the one miracle he can't conjure up is the ability to heal his paraplegic wife. Starring: Howard da Silva, Mary Jane Higby, Bryna Raeburn, Guy Sorel, Russell Horton
206	13	"A Death of Kings"	Himan Brown	Sam Dann	January 16, 1975
A brilliant but unassertive university scientist takes into his home a financially poor student... who might steal not only the professor's wife, but also his starting scientific discovery, one that could destroy the world. Starring: Robert Dryden, Mercedes McCambridge, William Redfield
207	14	"Ghost Talk"	Himan Brown	Elspeth Eric	January 17, 1975
After his death, Paul discovers he can communicate with his devastated widow, Melba, who promises she'll love and remember him always. But then Paul learns he must convince Melba to forget him, lest her own soul be stuck in an eternal limbo. Starring: Lenka Peterson, Elliot Reid, Gordon Gould, Robert Dryden
208	15	"The Precious Killer"	Himan Brown	Sam Dann	January 20, 1975
At one time, Karel Vortic endorsed the ideals that led to a revolution in Rourania, a European country that has now become an oppressive autocracy. After he is arrested on what turns out to be bogus charges of theft and treason, Vortic plans to defect... but finds that treachery and betrayal come from even the most familiar of faces. Starring: Beatrice Straight, Arnold Moss, Ralph Bell, Dan Ocko, Ann Pitoniak
209	16	"Concerto in Death"	Himan Brown	George Lowther	January 22, 1975
To the embarrassment of his family and his manager, a symphony conductor finds it hard to accept the death of his son, a talented violinist. Starring: Ian Martin, Marian Seldes, Carol Teitel, Lon Clark
210	17	"Sleepy Village"	Himan Brown	Fielden Farrington	January 23, 1975
A college professor and his wife move to a quiet New England town, but the mayor and the locals reject them for not being in "the right state of mind." Starring: Norman Rose, Martha Greenhouse, Court Benson, Ken Harvey
211	18	"The Flowers of Death"	Himan Brown	Sam Dann	January 24, 1975
The Greek god Dionysus appears in modern times to bring Gretchen Morrison's garden back to life. But will it impress Gretchen's husband... and more importantly, his boss? Starring: Mercedes McCambridge, Larry Haines, Roberta Maxwell, Gilbert Mack
212	19	"The Follower"	Himan Brown	Ian Martin	January 26, 1975
A New York talent agent is dogged by someone or something following his every footstep. Could that figure be a remnant from his past? Starring: Jerry Orbach, Carol Teitel, Nat Polen, Jackson Beck
213	20	"A Coffin for the Devil"	Himan Brown	Murray Burnett	January 27, 1975
A man summons a group of experts (series host E. G. Marshall among them) to read them a letter from one of his ancestors, which tells of a young mortician's assistant and a peculiar man ordering a special coffin for himself. Starring: Keir Dullea, Marian Seldes, Peter Collins, William Redfield, Nat Polen
214	21	"Windandingo"	Himan Brown	Sam Dann	January 28, 1975
A Revolutionary War soldier is sent home for accidentally shooting a prize steer, but is able to invoke an Indian spirit to help beat back a British regiment. Starring: Jack Grimes, Court Benson, Mason Adams, Bryna Raeburn, Earl Hammond
215	22	"The Night of the Wolf"	Himan Brown	Sam Dann	January 30, 1975
A police detective delves into how and why an ancient Indian ceremonial robe on display at a museum inspired violence and odd behavior among museum patrons. Starring: Michael Tolan, Evie Juster, Ken Harvey, Russell Horton, Joan Shay
216	23	"The Disembodied Voice"	Himan Brown	Ian Martin	January 31, 1975
A hospital psychiatrist reports to the police her receiving a series of obscene phone calls from a man who may be a serial rapist/murderer... and who may be targeting her as his next victim. Starring: Celeste Holm, Wesley Addy, Robert Dryden, Mildred Clinton

=== February ===
No. overall	No. in season	Title	Directed by	Written by	Original release date
217	24	"Death on Skis"	Himan Brown	George Lowther	February 3, 1975
Kay Wylie and her husband vacation at a ski resort that's been the scene of several brutal murders in past years... and where an investigator causes Kay to wonder if her husband is the killer. Starring: Rosemary Harris, Larry Haines, Ralph Bell, Norman Rose
218	25	"Death in the Stars"	Himan Brown	Ian Martin	February 4, 1975
A newspaper executive is upset when her paper's horoscope column predicts her imminent death. Starring: Kim Hunter, Paul Hecht, Mary Jane Higby, Rosemary Rice, Ian Martin
219	26	"The Sire de Maletroit's Door"	Himan Brown	Ian Martin	February 6, 1975
A man running from hooligans in 16th century France finds shelter in the home of a nobleman who tries to force him to marry his unruly niece. Starring: Michael Wager, Marian Seldes, Robert Dryden, William Redfield; Adapted from the short story by Robert Louis Stevenson
220	27	"Death Is So Trivial"	Himan Brown	Elspeth Eric	February 7, 1975
"Death will come when it will come..." After perishing in a hit-and-run accident, James Blake vows to spend his afterlife preventing the equally unnecessary deaths of others. Starring: Tony Roberts, Kristoffer Tabori, Suzanne Grossmann, Bryna Raeburn, Dan Ocko
221	28	"Journey Into Nowhere"	Himan Brown	Arnold Moss	February 10, 1975
An archaeologist finds artifacts connected with a goddess who vows revenge on anyone who exposes her power. Starring: Arnold Moss, Court Benson, Joan Lovejoy, Evie Juster
222	29	"A Small Question of Terror"	Himan Brown	George Lowther	February 13, 1975
A woman must use her wits and wiles to get herself, her beau, and her mother out of a tortuous (literally) interrogation by a police state, all caused by the mother's in-jest joke about the state's mysterious "Protector."; Starring: Teri Keane, Gordon Gould, Leon Janney, Joan Shay
223	30	"The Shadow of the Past"	Himan Brown	Sam Dann	February 14, 1975
Dr. Benno Koenig recognizes a patient as Karlheinz Meier, a guard at the Nazi concentration camp where he and his wife were imprisoned. Koenig then murders Meier (and tries to cover up the crime) after the guard threatens to reveal that the Koenigs are in the U.S. illegally. Starring: Howard DaSilva, Clarissa Blackburn, Sam Gray, Gilbert Mack, Jack Grimes
224	31	"The Death Wisher"	Himan Brown	Ian Martin	February 17, 1975
A man invites into his family's home the son of the friend who saved his life... but the boy possesses a deadly supernatural power. Starring: Ann Pitoniak, Court Benson, Roberta Maxwell, Jada Rowland, Michael Zaslow
225	32	"Love Me and Die"	Himan Brown	Sam Dann	February 18, 1975
Emily Barlow is haunted by the ghost of her first husband, who died in a rock climbing accident... and who has a warning to communicate to Emily's new husband. Starring: Ann Shepherd, Mason Adams, Robert Dryden, Robert L. Green
226	33	"Must Hope Perish"	Himan Brown	Sam Dann	February 20, 1975
A senator and presidential candidate is opposed to a trade bill with another country, out of a belief that that country's leading dissident is trying to communicate with him through poetry (despite the two men having never met). Starring: Hugh Marlowe
227	34	"The Weavers of Death"	Himan Brown	Sam Dann	February 21, 1975
Three people are killed in a grocery store holdup, including the ex-fiancée of the police detective investigating the crime; the detective soon discovers that the woman's murder was not a random act. Starring: Mandel Kramer
228	35	"Hell Hath No Fury"	Himan Brown	Ian Martin	February 24, 1975
A has-been actor murders his wealthy wife and believes no one will tie him to the crime; but the victim's half-sister, a modern-day witch, is onto him. Starring: William Redfield, Teri Keane, Patricia Wheel, Kenneth Harvey
229	36	"The Strange Case of Lucas Lauder"	Himan Brown	George Lowther	February 26, 1975
As he is about to be executed, a condemned murder tells the warden he's possessed by the spirit of Jack the Ripper, who will soon possess the warden and drive him to murder his wife. Starring: Robert Lansing
230	37	"Them!"	Himan Brown	Ralph Goodman	February 27, 1975
A lawyer and former judge takes it upon himself to kidnap and imprison acquitted criminals... but he may have taken his zeal for vigilante justice too far. Starring: Alan Hewitt, Jordan Charney, Augusta Dabney, Evie Juster, James Ducas
231	38	"An Identical Murder"	Himan Brown	Murray Burnett	February 28, 1975
Identical twins Jack and Vince Benton are both in love with the same woman, but Ann Slater loves only Jack. When Vince dies and his ghost appears, Ann is unsure which of the twins is really deceased. Starring: William Redfield, Elliot Reid, Roberta Maxwell

=== March ===
No. overall	No. in season	Title	Directed by	Written by	Original release date
232	39	"The Wakeful Ghost"	Himan Brown	Ian Martin	March 3, 1975
While visiting relatives in Ireland, an American man seeks the help of a leprechaun and the ghost of an ancestor to help him get the woman he loves. Starring: Paul Hecht, Virginia Payne, Jada Rowland, Leon Janney, Ian Martin
233	40	"The Pit and the Pendulum"	Himan Brown	George Lowther	March 4, 1975
A married couple are compelled to disclose a formula the husband has invented, one that could destroy the world if it fell into malicious hands. Starring: Tony Roberts, Marian Seldes, Norman Rose; An adaptation of the Edgar Allan Poe short story
234	41	"When the Death Bell Tolls"	Himan Brown	Ian Martin	March 6, 1975
An auto accident leaves a man in need of a life-saving surgery his family will not give consent to, out of retribution for the evil things the man has done. Starring: Mary Jane Higby, Rosemary Rice
235	42	"The Eye of Death"	Himan Brown	George Lowther	March 7, 1975
A young photographer named Sandy aims to prove her stepfather, Greg Manchester, murdered her mother. She assumes a prerogative of desperate measures when she comes to discover that he has plans to marry once again. Starring: Joan Hackett
236	43	"The Stuff of Dreams"	Himan Brown	Elspeth Eric	March 10, 1975
An eccentric recluse hires a young woman to tell her stories about her everyday life, but the arrival of the new hire's boyfriend causes bad things to happen. Starring: Bryna Raeburn, Marian Seldes, Jack Grimes, Dan Ocko
237	44	"The Dark Closet"	Himan Brown	Ian Martin	March 12, 1975
A severely claustrophobic and neurotic young woman is arrested as a robbery suspect, leading her father to disinherit her and a police psychologist to take an interest in the woman's case. Starring: Jada Rowland, Fred Gwynne, Kristoffer Tabori, Frances Sternhagen, Earl Hammond
238	45	"Death Pays No Dividend"	Himan Brown	Mary Jane Higby	March 13, 1975
A group of disgraced Wall Street financiers arrange their own deaths by an assassin's hand so that so that their families can collect on their life insurance. But then an unexpected stroke of good fortune comes their way... Starring: Ann Shepherd, Guy Sorel, Court Benson, Ken Harvey
239	46	"The Cezar Curse"	Himan Brown	Murray Burnett	March 14, 1975
A wealthy man takes a holiday with an aristocratic Spanish family, becomes smitten with the image of an evil woman on a painting in their house, and falls for that woman's daughter — who bears a familial curse. Starring: Richard Kiley, Roberta Maxwell, Ann Pitoniak, Robert Kaliban, Ian Martin; Adapted from a story by Robert Louis Stevenson
240	47	"Every Blossom Dies"	Himan Brown	Sam Dann	March 17, 1975
All the evidence in a young woman's murder points to the police detective investigating the case; the facts leave his superior doubtful, and his wife downright dismissive. Starring: Michael Tolan, Catherine Byers, George Petrie, Evie Juster
241	48	"It's Murder, Mr. Lincoln"	Himan Brown	Sam Dann	March 18, 1975
Against the legal establishment's warnings, young lawyer Abraham Lincoln aggressively presses forward in defending a client against a murder charge. Starring: Keir Dullea
242	49	"The Doppelganger"	Himan Brown	Ian Martin	March 20, 1975
A psychologist's daughter spurns her fiancé for a hoodlum boyfriend who forces her to have an abortion... but a gift-wrapped chance at revenge falls into the rejected man's lap. Starring: Rosemary Rice, Howard DaSilva, Tony Roberts, Russell Horton
243	50	"The Man Must Die"	Himan Brown	Elspeth Eric	March 21, 1975
Instead of a death penalty, a court judge administers a 20-years-to-life prison sentence to a convicted murder; the ruling angers the judge's son. Starring: William Prince, Kristoffer Tabori
244	51	"The Deadly Double"	Himan Brown	Victoria Dann	March 24, 1975
A woman escapes from a mental institution and forcefully swaps places with her sane sister. Starring: Marian Seldes
245	52	"Death is a Dream"	Himan Brown	Sam Dann	March 26, 1975
A woman has a dream about her brother being murdered, prompting her to pursue the killer even without proof of an actual crime. Starring: Mercedes McCambridge
246	53	"The Velvet Claws"	Himan Brown	Murray Burnett	March 27, 1975
A young man tells his therapist how he escaped from a town whose residences have an unhealthy preoccupation with cats. Starring: Gordon Gould
247	54	"Key to Murder"	Himan Brown	George Lowther	March 28, 1975
A police detective probes the case of two murders that took place in rooms sealed from the inside with no apparent exits. Starring: Mercedes McCambridge
248	55	"Killer of the Year"	Himan Brown	Sam Dann	March 31, 1975
A businessman meets and falls for the town's new librarian — a woman he was once previously smitten by when she was on trial for murder several years earlier. Starring: Norman Rose, Teri Keane, Nat Polen, Ken Harvey, Joan Shay

=== April ===
No. overall	No. in season	Title	Directed by	Written by	Original release date
249	56	"The Killer Inside"	Himan Brown	Sam Dann	April 1, 1975
A woman's mundane life is stirred when her transporting of a package to Europe (at her boyfriend's request) puts her into the middle of international intrigue. Starring: Anne Meara
250	57	"The Garrison of the Dead"	Himan Brown	Sam Dann	April 3, 1975
After his hanging for murdering a reporter who wrote about him, a hustler is given a second chance at life and fulfilling his dream of becoming a writer. But does the man want that dream anymore? Starring: Mandel Kramer
251	58	"Roses Are for Funerals"	Himan Brown	George Lowther	April 4, 1975
The story of a cross-Atlantic romance turns into a case of murder and intrigue, with a fake leopard skin coat as key evidence. Starring: Carole Shelby, Tony Roberts, Mildred Clinton, Dan Ocko
252	59	"The Benjamin Franklin Murder Case"	Himan Brown	Sam Dann	April 7, 1975
Future Founding Father Ben Franklin helps solve a murder in a Philadelphia mansion in 1750. Starring: Paul Hecht
253	60	"The Altar of Blood"	Himan Brown	Ian Martin	April 9, 1975
After relocating to Mexico, a retired archaeological professor and his daughter discover a buried Aztec pyramid and are transported back in time to the Aztec era... where the daughter is forced into a sacrificial ritual. Starring: Fred Gwynne, Jennifer Harmon, Mason Adams, Ian Martin
254	61	"The Death of Halpin Fraser"	Himan Brown	Arnold Moss	April 10, 1975
A trip through Purgatory awaits a young man who's haunted by the voices of his mother, his father-in-law, and the wife he had murdered. Starring: Michael Wager, Grace Matthews, Court Benson, Arnold Moss, Patricia Elliott; Adapted from the ghost story by Ambrose Bierce
255	62	"The Phantom Stop"	Himan Brown	Ian Martin	April 11, 1975
Alvin Frieburger desires to take the express subway to a stop that doesn't exist, but it's a location he believes will be the start of a better life. Starring: Norman Rose
256	63	"The Intermediary"	Himan Brown	Fielden Farrington	April 14, 1975
At his wife's urging, Frank Ellington accepts inheritance of the home owned by his late stepmother — the same house in which the stepmother treated a young Frank with cruelty. Starring: Ralph Bell, Frances Sternhagen, Leon Janney
257	64	"My Own Murderer"	Himan Brown	Henry Slesar	April 15, 1975
Joe Vincent seeks a psychiatrist's help to prevent Joe Vinacelli from murdering him. Problem is, Joe Vincent and Joe Vinacelli are the same person. Starring: Mandel Kramer
258	65	"Through the Looking Glass"	Himan Brown	Fielden Farrington	April 17, 1975
Kathy & Doug Sellars get new neighbors, one of whom is an inventor that offers Doug a solar energy device that will revolutionize the world. Starring: Ann Shepherd, Ken Harvey, Evie Juster, Jack Grimes, Russell Horton
259	66	"A Challenge for the Dead"	Himan Brown	Sam Dann	April 18, 1975
Police officer Johnny Gordon aims to nail for murder a gangster who has the same name as him. But then the cop's wife rekindles an affair with the criminal... Starring: Howard DaSilva, Teri Keane, Robert Dryden, Leon Janney, Bryna Raeburn
260	67	"Sting of Death"	Himan Brown	George Lowther	April 21, 1975
With the help of shrunken heads and a mysterious clock, explorer Trevor Constaine aims to see his daughter and his assistant marry... not minding that they are both well-content in their respective relationships. Starring: William Prince, Tony Roberts, Marian Seldes, Martha Greenhouse
261	68	"Afraid to Live, Afraid to Die"	Himan Brown	Ian Martin	April 23, 1975
Ellen Muir recounts a terrifying tale of her caring for the elderly, insane matron of the haunted mansion Malvern Grange. Starring: Jada Rowland, Anne Pitoniak
262	69	"Bullet Proof"	Himan Brown	George Lowther	April 24, 1975
Rocky Stark is sent to prison for murdering a hoodlum, even though he kept his gun at his side and never committed the killing. When the true culprit is killed by Rocky's gun, Rocky's faithful wife starts her own probe into the matter. Starring: Mason Adams, Patricia Elliott
263	70	"Till Death Do Us Join"	Himan Brown	Ian Martin	April 25, 1975
A Gothic romance tale, set in old Prussia, between a young art student and his professor's niece... whose hand in marriage is sold to a financier. Starring: Don Scardino, Roberta Maxwell
264	71	"The Phantom of the Opera"	Himan Brown	Murray Burnett	April 28, 1975
An adaptation of Gaston Leroux's novel about a ghastly figure who haunts the Paris Opera House and possesses a mesmerizing power over its star soprano. Starring: Court Benson, Gordon Gould, Carol Teitel, Paul Hecht
265	72	"Black Widow"	Himan Brown	Bob Juhren	April 29, 1975
Desiring revenge for her husband's murder, a union official's widow seeks help from a witch and her corral of black widow spiders. Starring: Evie Juster, Robert Dryden, Hetty Galen, Dan Ocko, Jackson Beck

=== May ===
No. overall	No. in season	Title	Directed by	Written by	Original release date
266	73	"Mad Monkton"	Himan Brown	Ian Martin	May 1, 1975
Stephen Monkton will be the last heir to a gothic family curse of insanity and madness... provided he can find his uncle's corpse in Naples and return it to the family crypt in the U.S. Starring: Kristoffer Tabori; Adapted from a short story by Wilkie Collins
267	74	"The Final Witness"	Himan Brown	Sam Dann	May 2, 1975
An average middle-class guy witnesses his friend's murder, points to the culprit... and wavers on the witness stand, resulting in the murderer's acquittal. It leads to the man's friend visiting him from the dead... and to extreme actions meant to appease his spirit. Starring: Lou Jacobi
268	75	"The Paradise of the Devil"	Himan Brown	Sam Dann	May 5, 1975
After a nightwatchman is murdered, his daughter promises her inheritance to the person who'll find the killer... an inheritance that isn't as meager as she imagined. Starring: Larry Haines, Robert Kaliban, Peter Collins, Gilbert Mack, Catherine Byers
269	76	"The Transformation"	Himan Brown	Elspeth Eric	May 7, 1975
An adaptation of Mary Shelley's short story about a man who, after squandering his family fortune and his fiancée's love, makes a deal with an underground demon: He'll receive the demon's fortune, while the demon gets three days' use of his body. It's a deal the demon reneges on. Starring: Kevin McCarthy, Evie Juster, Robert Dryden, Ian Martin
270	77	"Taken for Granite"	Himan Brown	Hank Warner	May 8, 1975
A deranged artist serves as caretaker of a garden filled with statues... which are actually live models encased in granite powder. Starring: Howard DaSilva
271	78	"The Voices of Death"	Himan Brown	Sam Dann	May 9, 1975
An electronics executive finds an old crystal radio set at a yard sale; when it broadcasts a debate over the fate of mankind, the executive sets out to encourage humanity to change its wicked ways. Starring: Norman Rose
272	79	"For Tomorrow We Die"	Himan Brown	Ian Martin	May 12, 1975
After his release from prison (where he served three decades for his wife's murder), Harry Taylor seeks out old flame Jesse Craig, whose son-in-law wonders if Harry's love is sincere or motivated by brokenhearted revenge. Starring: Beatrice Straight, Ralph Bell, Nat Polen, Evie Juster, Russell Horton
273	80	"Where Angels Fear to Tread"	Himan Brown	George Lowther	May 13, 1975
A professor of paranormal psychology experiments with astral projection, but the undertaking goes wildly out of control. Starring: Michael Tolan
274	81	"Deadly Dilemma"	Himan Brown	Ian Martin	May 15, 1975
It's up to an attendant and a co-pilot to determine which of the passengers on their Central America-to-New York flight possesses a bomb. Starring: William Prince, Patricia Elliott
275	82	"The Rise and Fall of the Fourth Reich"	Himan Brown	Henry Slesar	May 16, 1975
Two scientists discover an aged, sickly Adolf Hitler living in Mexico City, and begin experiments to restore the former tyrant's health and youth. Starring: Robert Dryden, Paul Hecht
276	83	"The Diamond Necklace"	Himan Brown	George Lowther	May 19, 1975
A couple with modest means borrows a rich friend's diamond necklace to wear at a dinner party; when they lose the necklace, the husband is forced to borrow $6500 from an evil financier... and tragedies soon follow. Starring: Mandel Kramer, Marian Seldes; Adapted from Guy de Maupassant's short story "The Necklace"
277	84	"Don't Let it Choke You"	Himan Brown	Ian Martin	May 21, 1975
A widowed antique dealer is forced to adopt a teenage orphan; but as he tries to connect with the young girl, he begins to discover why death has come to his recent acquaintances. Starring: Robert L. Green, Jennifer Harmon, Court Benson, Ann Pitoniak, Larry Robinson
278	85	"Return to Shadow Lake"	Himan Brown	Fielden Farrington	May 22, 1975
The Maxwells drive through a blizzard to their summer cabin upon learning an attempted burglary has occurred; once there, they're reacquainted with a mystical scene from their recent past — a moment that may forever affect their lives. Starring: Nat Polen, Joan Lovejoy
279	86	"Markheim: Man or Monster?"	Himan Brown	Ian Martin	May 23, 1975
Denied an inheritance from his wealthy uncle, manipulative Karl Markheim exploits his wife and father-in-law for their money — blithely unaware of the mysterious figure witnessing his actions from behind a mirror. Starring: Kevin McCarthy; Adapted from a short story by Robert Louis Stevenson
280	87	"The Witches' Almanac"	Himan Brown	Ian Martin	May 26, 1975
A married witch and warlock concoct a potion that will grant them eternal life; but it's missing a key ingredient, the blood of their young virgin boarder... who has fallen in love. Starring: Virginia Payne, Robert Dryden, Jada Rowland, Dan Ocko, Marshall Borden
281	88	"The Executioner"	Himan Brown	George Lowther	May 27, 1975
Their car's breakdown is the least of an American couple's troubles when they seek shelter in an ancient Scottish manor — which was once home to Elizabeth I's personal executioner and is now inhabited by a strange lord. Starring: Tony Roberts, Marian Seldes, Jack Moss, Jacqueline Brooks
282	89	"Just One More Day"	Himan Brown	Sam Dann	May 29, 1975
On his last day on the beat, a retiring cop has foreboding premonitions of his own death in a shootout. Starring: Theodore Bikel
283	90	"Someday I'll Find You"	Himan Brown	Bob Juhren	May 30, 1975
Ann Markle is recovering from the trauma of her explorer husband's presumed death; finding a painting with his depiction at a Mexican flea market spurs her to take a cross-country search to find him. Starring: Betsy Palmer

=== June ===
No. overall	No. in season	Title	Directed by	Written by	Original release date
284	91	"River of Hades"	Himan Brown	Mary Jane Higby	June 2, 1975
A dancer defects from a communist country and becomes the object of a stalker in New York City. Starring: Marian Seldes
285	92	"The Devil's Leap"	Himan Brown	Ian Martin	June 4, 1975
A famous film star works to reunite an estranged father and son after the mysterious death of their wife and mother. Starring: Mercedes McCambridge, Robert Dryden, Kristoffer Tabori, Ian Martin
286	93	"The Plastic Man"	Himan Brown	Ian Martin	June 5, 1975
A shallow playboy becomes entangled with a married woman, and is subject to the destructive powers of her parapsychologist husband. Starring: Don Scardino, Joan Loring, Russell Horton, Catherine Byers
287	94	"The Transformer"	Himan Brown	Sam Dann	June 6, 1975
Police suspect a salesman in the death of his boss. It turns out he carelessly told his old war buddy — a professional hitman — that he believed his boss was hindering his career advancement. Starring: Howard DaSilva
288	95	"Fallen Angel"	Himan Brown	Elspeth Eric	June 9, 1975
A manic-depressive writer believes an angel from Heaven is his muse, but he's prone to binge-drinking whenever the angel departs. One such binge lands him in a sanatorium... where he learns that his angel has been replaced. Starring: Ralph Bell, Carol Teitel, Court Benson, Joe Silver, Jack Grimes
289	96	"The Queen of Darkness"	Himan Brown	Sam Dann	June 10, 1975
A vain, out-of-work actress is recruited to masquerade as the queen of an obscure monarchy. It may turn out to be a permanent gig. Starring: Julie Harris
290	97	"A Case of Negligence"	Himan Brown	Ian Martin	June 12, 1975
After his father dies during a supposedly routine surgery, a greedy man sues the hospital and the attending surgeon. It's a lawsuit that has troubling consequences. Starring: Mason Adams, Marian Seldes, Robert Kaliban, Gilbert Mack, Hetty Galen, Alan Hewitt
291	98	"Stairway to Oblivion"	Himan Brown	Elizabeth Pennell	June 13, 1975
Julia Stephens travels to a remote mountaintop estate, Oblivion, to visit an uncle she has never met. While there, she finds a mystery involving the fate of the estate's previous visitors. Starring: Ann Shepherd
292	99	"The Smile of Deceit"	Himan Brown	Sam Dann	June 16, 1975
A woman marries a wealthy, eccentric college professor and moves with him to an isolated tribal area. When the natives accuse her of an extra-marital indiscretion, she must undergo a strange ritual to prove her innocence. Starring: Jennifer Harmon, Arnold Moss, Robert Dryden, Joan Shay
293	100	"Frame-Up"	Himan Brown	George Lowther	June 18, 1975
A woman is framed for murder by her adulterous husband, the result of his plan to seize her wealth. Refusing to take the rap, the woman fights to not only clear her name but also secure the safety of her special needs stepdaughter. Starring: Mercedes McCambridge, Bryna Raeburn, Ian Martin, Leon Janney
294	101	"The Climbing Boy"	Himan Brown	Elspeth Eric	June 19, 1975
In 1819 England, two noble women help the aggrieved ghost of an abused young chimney sweep seek revenge on the Lord who abused him. Starring: Marian Seldes, Evie Juster, Court Benson, Ian Martin
295	102	"Can You Trust Your Husband?"	Himan Brown	Sam Dann	June 20, 1975
After he's arrested on drug trafficking charges, a woman holds firm to her belief of her husband's innocence... even though evidence and leads in her own investigation suggest she did not know him as well as she had thought. Starring: Joan Lovejoy, Mandel Kramer
296	103	"The Mills of the Gods"	Himan Brown	Ian Martin	June 23, 1975
An American touring Europe becomes enamored by a Parisian man... who police believe is a murderer who, despite being recently acquitted in one homicide case, won't hesitate to strike again. Starring: Joan Copeland, Tony Roberts
297	104	"The Mask of Tupac Amaru"	Himan Brown	Murray Burnett	June 24, 1975
Tension between an anthropology grad student and her fiancé is aggravated when they come into contact with an ancient Incan artifact, one that brings death to those who possess it. Starring: Ruby Dee, Michael Wager
298	105	"That Hamlet Was a Good Boy"	Himan Brown	Fielden Farrington	June 26, 1975
A modern-day take on Hamlet, finds the ghost of a murdered factory owner imploring his son to expose the lad's faithless mother and greedy uncle for the murderers they are. Starring: Will MacKenzie, Jennifer Harmon
299	106	"The Rape of the Maia"	Himan Brown	Sam Dann	June 27, 1975
All evidence points to a famous dress designer in notorious gambler's murder; his lawyer must match wits with a wily bookie to win his client's acquittal. Starring: Arnold Stang, Norman Rose, Earl Hammond, Jackson Beck, Joan Shay
300	107	"The Golden Cauldron"	Himan Brown	Ralph Goodman	June 30, 1975
A ghastly whodunit involving a trio of friends, a modern-day weapon, and a supposedly haunted castle overlooking Stonehenge. Starring: Paul Hecht, Russell Horton, Robert Dryden, Clarissa Blackburn, Patricia Elliott

=== July ===
No. overall	No. in season	Title	Directed by	Written by	Original release date
301	108	"Come Back With Me"	Himan Brown	Sam Dann	July 2, 1975
A businessman going through hard times goes back in time to visit the watering hole he enjoyed in his younger days. But the old friends he meets there all share a disturbing trait. Starring: Howard DaSilva
302	109	"Murder Will Out"	Himan Brown	Ian Martin	July 3, 1975
A New York police detective goes to Miami in search of the man who killed his father (who was also an NYPD cop); when he finds his quarry, he's forced to re-examine his desire for revenge. Starring: Mason Adams, Marian Seldes, Gilbert Mack, Leon Janney, Robert Maxwell
303	110	"The Slave"	Himan Brown	Henry Slesar	July 4, 1975
The stakes are high when two men make a daring bet, with the loser agreeing to serve as the winner's indentured servant for a full year. Starring: Mandel Kramer, Fred Gwynne
304	111	"Guilty"	Himan Brown	Elspeth Eric	July 7, 1975
Professing his innocence after being accused of assaulting a female colleague, a college professor takes a polygraph test — and fails, leaving him to question the role of technology in society. Starring: Nat Polen, Jean Gillespie, Jack Grimes, Ann Pitoniak
305	112	"The Triangle"	Himan Brown	Sam Dann	July 8, 1975
The sole survivor of a plane crash in the Bermuda Triangle tells of a lost paradise within the mysterious void. Starring: Mercedes McCambridge
306	113	"The Ghostly Rival"	Himan Brown	Ian Martin	July 10, 1975
A young man strikes a deal with a mysterious creature to gain enough wealth to rival (and impress) his prospective father-in-law. Starring: Will MacKenzie
307	114	"The Widow's Auxiliary"	Himan Brown	Fielden Farrington	July 11, 1975
A woman must save her husband from the lure of a local men's association, who wants his mechanical aptitude to advance their agenda. Starring: Lenka Peterson, Gordon Gould, Court Benson, Carol Teitel, Arnold Moss
308	115	"Snake in the Grass"	Himan Brown	Sam Dann	July 14, 1975
A scientist allows her colleague to take credit for discovering a new variety of clover — and winds up later receiving the blame for his murder. Starring: Sandy Dennis, Ralph Bell, Robert Dryden, Arnold Stang
309	116	"Goodbye, Karl Erich"	Himan Brown	Sam Dann	July 16, 1975
The diary of Dr. Heinrich Steinler recalls how, in 1927 Germany, he treated a young man who had been incommunicative in the 10 years since his father's death in war. Dr Steinler would succeed in teaching Karl Erich Mueller to become well-versed and confident... but would also unwittingly create a monster. Starring: Kevin McCarthy, Paul Hecht, Joan Shay, Bryna Raeburn, Sam Gray
310	117	"Nightmare's Nest"	Himan Brown	Ian Martin	July 17, 1975
A reclusive scientist purchases a remote country estate, but the malevolent spirit who haunts the grounds is sure to disturb the peace. Starring: Gordon Gould
311	118	"The Spots of the Leopard"	Himan Brown	Sam Dann	July 18, 1975
A dock worker and his wife are placed in witness protection after he exposes organized crime activities within his company and union; it is an adjustment that the wife is unable to accept. Starring: Ann Shepherd, Gilbert Mack
312	119	"Fateful Reunion"	Himan Brown	Elizabeth Pennell	July 21, 1975
A scientist invents a supercomputer that can predict future events; he and his fiancée use it for party entertainment... but the fun dims when it makes a harrowing forecast involving their war buddy fathers. Starring: Robert Dryden, Jennifer Harmon
313	120	"The Poisoned Pen"	Himan Brown	Sam Dann	July 22, 1975
The deaths of several people are tied to two things: they each received a mysterious letter, and they shared disdain for a marginally-talented actress. Starring: Roberta Maxwell, Michael Tolan
314	121	"Appointment in Uganda"	Himan Brown	Elspeth Eric	July 24, 1975
A man obsessed with preparing for the afterlife suffers a heart attack and is clinically dead for a few minutes. During that time between life and death, he lives life as an elephant calf, and tries to incorporate lessons learned from the experience after he is revived. Starring: William Redfield, Arnold Stang
315	122	"Woman from Hell"	Himan Brown	Murray Burnett	July 25, 1975
While investigating her alleged suicide, a private detective reads the personal journal of an actress whose last film project found her caught up in conflict with its real-life subject matter — a coven of witches. Starring: Joan Lovejoy, Mandel Kramer, Nat Polen, Norman Rose, Paul Hecht
316	123	"The Lady Is a Jinx"	Himan Brown	Sam Dann	July 28, 1975
A police detective falls for a woman whose previous lovers all met untimely deaths; the sister of her most recent victim requests his assistance in seeking justice for her brother. Starring: Larry Haines, Marian Seldes, Dan Ocko, Patricia Elliott
317	124	"He Moves in Mysterious Ways"	Himan Brown	Ian Martin	July 30, 1975
A hospital clergyman literally risks his own health and life in order to give counsel to an injured dancer facing surgery. Starring: Leon Janney, Teri Keane, Robert Dryden, Ian Martin, Patsy Bruder
318	125	"Carmilla"	Himan Brown	Ian Martin	July 31, 1975
In early 20th century Austria, a young woman and her widower father are charged with caring for a female ward; though the two women become close, the orphan harbors a secret that threatens to destroy their lives. Starring: Mercedes McCambridge, Marian Seldes, Court Benson, Martha Greenhouse, Staats Cotsworth; Adapted from the novella by Sheridan Le Fanu

=== August ===
No. overall	No. in season	Title	Directed by	Written by	Original release date
319	126	"The Onyx Eye"	Himan Brown	Sidney Sloan	August 1, 1975
A husband and wife experience good fortune immediately after purchasing a strange antique curio. But when their infant child dies, the wife suspects the charm is actually a source of great evil. Starring: Frances Sternhagen, Michael Wager, William Redfield, Bryna Raeburn, Sidney Sloan
320	127	"The Devil's Boutique"	Himan Brown	Bob Juhren	August 4, 1975
An arrogant fashion designer visits a boutique at a Caribbean resort city, claims some of the shopkeeper's designs as her own... and suffers excruciating lessons in stealing from the Devil himself. Starring: Joan Loring, Robert L. Green
321	128	"Hung Jury"	Himan Brown	Sam Dann	August 5, 1975
A married, seemingly average accountant leads a side life of lust (with a prostitute) and danger (gambling debts). When bookies demand payment, he soon discovers a solution to his problems when he's empaneled on a jury hearing testimony to a murder he committed. Starring: Howard DaSilva, Robert Dryden, Guy Sorel, Joan Shay, Catherine Byers
322	129	"To Die is Forever"	Himan Brown	Ian Martin	August 7, 1975
A wealthy eccentric plans to have himself and his terminally ill wife cryogenically preserved until a cure is found for her cancer. But his plans are disrupted when his body is overtaken by a deceased relative's spirit. Starring: Mandel Kramer, Marian Seldes
323	130	"The Grey Ghost"	Himan Brown	Ian Martin	August 8, 1975
Deep in grief over her race car driver father's death, a woman abandons her husband for Italy, where she meets and agrees to sponsor a talented driver. While watching him race, she learns the truth about the crash that cost her father his life. Starring: Betsy Palmer
324	131	"Age Cannot Wither Her"	Himan Brown	Sam Dann	August 11, 1975
An elderly man returns to shore alone after taking his young wife on a sailing trip. When a sheriff questions her disappearance, the man tells him a fantastic tale of eternal life. Starring: Joe Silver, Jennifer Harmon
325	132	"The Master Computer"	Himan Brown	Fielden Farrington	August 13, 1975
A couple return from vacation to find that their existence has been wiped clean from society's records; a computer glitch is the culprit. Starring: Robert Dryden, Augusta Dabney
326	133	"The Root of All Evil"	Himan Brown	Roy Winsor	August 14, 1975
A copywriter finds $80,000 in his trash bin and uses it to escape life's drudgery; paranoia, and the robbers who stole that loot in a bank robbery, soon plague him. Starring: Norman Rose, Ann Shepherd
327	134	"The Unbearable Reflection"	Himan Brown	Ian Martin	August 15, 1975
A state governor's despicable wife is tricked into killing her husband by the man's campaign manager — who's really the Devil aiming to claim her soul. Starring: Patricia Elliott, Mandel Kramer
328	135	"Help Somebody"	Himan Brown	Elspeth Eric	August 18, 1975
Anthony Price is on a lucky streak: His novel becomes a best seller, he inherits a fortune, and he finds the woman of his dreams. What Anthony doesn't have is happiness. That's when "Somebody" enters his life. Starring: William Redfield
329	136	"Welcome for a Dead Man"	Himan Brown	Henry Slesar	August 19, 1975
Released from prison after serving 21 years for murdering a payroll assistant, a crook sets out to find the stolen loot he stashed away... but discovers something much more important. Starring: Howard DaSilva
330	137	"Circle of Evil"	Himan Brown	Sidney Sloan	August 21, 1975
Two special needs adults are placed under a caregiver's watch; she is soon plagued by a restless spirit seeking justice for his murder. Starring: Marian Seldes, Kristoffer Tabori
331	138	"Terror in the Air"	Himan Brown	Ian Martin	August 22, 1975
A doctor is forced to land a plane and attend to a woman in labor when food poisoning strikes the crew of the plane they're flying. Starring: Robert Dryden, Jennifer Harmon
332	139	"Person to be Notified"	Himan Brown	Sam Dann	August 25, 1975
A woman takes a job at the remote island home of an eccentric author, then sets out to prove the author's butler is up to no good. Starring: Mercedes McCambridge, Russell Horton, Gilbert Mack, Bryna Raeburn, Ian Martin
333	140	"The Eavesdropper"	Himan Brown	Fielden Farrington	August 27, 1975
A couple is hired to spy on a renowned scientist and his wife at their estate in the Pocono Mountains. Starring: Arnold Moss, Ralph Bell, Joan Arless, Patricia Wheel
334	141	"Night of the Howling Dog"	Himan Brown	Murray Burnett	August 28, 1975
A minister and his daughter lead a camping trip on a deserted island... with a werewolf in the group's midst. Starring: Mason Adams, Marian Seldes, Norman Rose, Guy Sorel, Kristoffer Tabori; Adapted from a story by Algernon Blackwood
335	142	"Murder by Proxy"	Himan Brown	Roy Winsor	August 29, 1975
Ed Hunter served as foreman on the jury that put Tim Cohain in prison for murder. Now released, Cohain is looking for revenge against Hunter. Starring: Mandel Kramer, Grace Matthews, Lesley Woods, Earl Hammond, Leon Janney, William Redfield

=== September ===
No. overall	No. in season	Title	Directed by	Written by	Original release date
336	143	"The Smile of Death"	Himan Brown	Ian Martin	September 1, 1975
An obnoxious baron's illegitimate son enlists the spirit of his late mother to extort his birthright and ensure his rightful inheritance. Starring: Russell Horton, Joan Shay, Court Benson, Evie Juster, Ian Martin
337	144	"Portrait of Death"	Himan Brown	Elizabeth Pennell	September 2, 1975
While honeymooning in Venice, a woman sets out to view a rare painting she fell in love with while she was an art student in the city years earlier. When they learn it's been replaced by a counterfeit, the woman and her husband seek out her former teacher to find the original. Starring: Tony Roberts, Rosemary Rice, Robert Dryden, Gilbert Mack
338	145	"The Special Undertaking"	Himan Brown	Ian Martin	September 4, 1975
A young country doctor and his wife confront a ghost in their new home, with an antique music box serving as the only clue to the spirit's identity. Starring: Jada Rowland, Don Scardino
339	146	"Sleepwalker"	Himan Brown	Sam Dann	September 5, 1975
A woman who wants so badly to kill her husband begins to plot his demise in her sleep... which makes it hard for her to construct a possible alibi. Starring: Tammy Grimes
340	147	"The Other Life"	Himan Brown	Sam Dann	September 8, 1975
A lonely housewife finds refuge in playing the ponies; but as her gambling debts mount, the distance between herself and her political aspirant husband grows further. Starring: Mercedes McCambridge, Ralph Bell
341	148	"The Ides of March"	Himan Brown	Sam Dann	September 10, 1975
A wife desperately attempts to get her husband to cancel his business trip when she foresees his death in a vision. Starring: Nina Foch, Les Tremayne
342	149	"The Voice of Death"	Himan Brown	Ian Martin	September 11, 1975
A washed-up ventriloquist finds the perfect dummy to continue his act; the doll's designer plans to possess his soul in exchange. Starring: Victor Jory
343	150	"The Ghost Plane"	Himan Brown	Ian Martin	September 12, 1975
"For all intents and purposes, the plane in which we are traveling is not different from any normal jet... with two exceptions perhaps." The charter flight in question is carrying passengers who have no recollection of who they are, how they came aboard... and more importantly, where they're going. Starring: Richard Crenna, Virginia Gregg, Janet Waldo, Casey Kasem, Sam Edwards
344	151	"The Little Old Lady Killer"	Himan Brown	Sam Dann	September 15, 1975
A police detective finds it hard to convince her colleagues that an elderly woman is the vigilante responsible for the deaths of several animal abusers. Starring: Diane Baker, Anne Seymour
345	152	"The Prison of Glass"	Himan Brown	Ian Martin	September 16, 1975
Weighed down by the emotional baggage her mother, husband, and agent have all loaded on her (not to mention the death of her father), a talented actress seeks refuge in the world inside a glass snow globe. Starring: Lois Nettleton
346	153	"The Coffin with the Golden Nails"	Himan Brown	Sam Dann	September 18, 1975
Determined to start a new life (and with the brutal government he serves on the verge of being overthrown), the head of a Latin American country's secret police undergoes cosmetic surgery. All goes well afterwards... until he falls for a woman he previously tortured. Starring: Howard Da Silva, Marian Seldes
347	154	"The Third Person"	Himan Brown	Arnold/Stella Moss	September 19, 1975
Two spinster cousins inherit an ancestral home, which is occupied by a long-dead cousin's ghost... who is quite the nationalist. Starring: Marian Seldes, Evie Juster; Adapted from the short story by Henry James
348	155	"Solid Gold Soldiers"	Himan Brown	Sam Dann	September 22, 1975
Two Civil War spies play a battle of wits and deception against warring forces, allies, and even each other in an effort to secure $1 million in Confederate gold. Starring: Michael Wager, Evie Juster
349	156	"The Headless Hessian"	Himan Brown	Sam Dann	September 23, 1975
A headless specter first frightens, then helps General George Washington's troops on the eve of their assault on Trenton. Starring: Lloyd Bochner, Jack Grimes, Mariette Hartley, Casey Kasem, Robert Maxwell
350	157	"The Angels of Devil's Mountain"	Himan Brown	Sam Dann	September 24, 1975
Severe chest pains force a traveling salesman to make a stop off at a remote village, where he's astounded to learn he's the reincarnation of the town's long-dead Revolutionary War hero. Starring: Warren Stevens
351	158	"The Black Whale"	Himan Brown	Sam Dann	September 25, 1975
A newly-literate slave in antebellum Texas longs to be free, but death is the fate of anyone who tries to liberate him. Starring: Brock Peters
352	159	"Assassination in Time"	Himan Brown	Ian Martin	September 26, 1975
A time-traveling couple struggle with whether to prevent the assassination of Abraham Lincoln, and in doing so alter the course of history. Starring: William Redfield, Jennifer Harmon, Bryna Raeburn, Gordon Gould
353	160	"The Thomas Jefferson Defense"	Himan Brown	Sam Dann	September 27, 1975
Thomas Jefferson must defend an innocent Indian chief against both a murder indictment and the narrow-minded attitudes of a town that's ready to rig up the hangman's platform. Starring: Paul Hecht
354	161	"The Other Self"	Himan Brown	Sam Dann	September 28, 1975
A psychologist examines a factory worker with an exemplary work record. His secret to focusing on tedious tasks? Having an obsession over the American Civil War, in particular the Battle of Shiloh. Starring: Howard Da Silva, Joan Lovejoy
355	162	"You're Only Young Twice"	Himan Brown	Fielden Farrington	September 29, 1975
A scientist develops a formula that reverses the aging process, and seduces his sister-in-law (a middle-aged stage actress) into using it. Starring: Ann Shepherd, Norman Rose, Virginia Dwyer, Earl Hammond

=== October ===
No. overall	No. in season	Title	Directed by	Written by	Original release date
356	163	"Primrose Path"	Himan Brown	Sam Dann	October 1, 1975
Displaying clear parallels to the Patricia Hearst case, this tale follows Maryann Melon, heir to a family-owned newspaper conglomerate and kidnapping victim — and possibly willing member — of a radical terrorist group. Starring: Mason Adams, Rosemary Rice, Ken Harvey, Ian Martin, Jack Grimes
357	164	"The Man Who Ran Away"	Himan Brown	Elspeth Eric	October 2, 1975
Upset over his wife's infidelity, David Trent drives to a nearby town and discovers a seemingly abandoned estate, where he meets a woman who's just as lonely as he is. Starring: Robert Dryden, Mercedes McCambridge
358	165	"Five Ghostly Indians"	Himan Brown	Roy Winsor	October 6, 1975
A vacationing college professor and an innkeeper discover a strange Indian arrowhead along a spot of Maine shoreline where an early explorer massacred a pentet of natives. Soon after, they and other inn guests are haunted by specters of the vengeful natives. Starring: Robert Dryden, Court Benson, Anne Pitoniak, James Gregory, Suzanne Grossmann
359	166	"Who Made Me?"	Himan Brown	Sam Dann	October 7, 1975
Set in a future where every person is given societal rankings based on their abilities and intellectual capacity, a fighter pilot in "Group One" is challenged when his son desires the more attractive life of "Group Three" citizenry. Starring: Larry Haines, Don Scardino, Evelyn Juster, Marian Seldes
360	167	"They Shall Stone Them With Stones"	Himan Brown	Sidney Sloan	October 9, 1975
Mindreader Madame Dahrazum and her out-of-work husband put together a Vaudeville act. But trouble finds them when, during a show, Ms. Dahrazum sees visions of an unsolved murder... and soon after gains the attraction of the prime suspect in the case. Starring: Teri Keane, Jackson Beck, Arnold Stang, William Redfield
361	168	"The Last Lesson"	Himan Brown	Sam Dann	October 13, 1975
Threatened with death unless he pays off his monetary debts, compulsive gambler Clarence Porter marries the plain yet wealthy Penny Meadows. But things don't go according to plan when Penny refuses Clarence an inheritance... and he realizes that she's a person who's hard to kill off. Starring: Fred Gwynne, Marian Haley
362	169	"The Kiss of Death"	Himan Brown	Ian Martin	October 15, 1975
Despite the warnings of his mentors, an aspiring doctor in Padua, Italy falls in love with the daughter of the town's crackpot physician, who has developed a flower that's meant for herbal treatments but is lethal to the touch. Starring: Kirk Peterson, Gilbert Mack, Arnold Moss, Bryna Raeburn, Patsy Bruder; Adapted from Nathaniel Hawthorne's short story "Rappaccini's Daughter"
363	170	"Stay Out of Dutchman's Woods"	Himan Brown	Fielden Farrington	October 16, 1975
After a newlywed couple honeymooning in Maine become lost and separated in the titular woods, the husband comes under the enticement of a spirit whose husband murdered her 200 years earlier for her infidelity. Starring: Paul Hecht, Joan Lorring, Jada Rowland
364	171	"Never in This World"	Himan Brown	Ian Martin	October 20, 1975
When David Campbell discovers the ruins of an old church, he's drawn into challenging an ancient Gaelic curse... and in doing so becomes possessed by an evil spirit. Starring: Alexander Scourby
365	172	"Million Dollar Murder"	Himan Brown	Sam Dann	October 21, 1975
Facing a liquidation of his furniture company's assets, Dick Nelson is offered $1 million by a wealthy old flame, provided he kill a close friend. Only later does Dick realize he's caught up in a deadly vendetta. Starring: Mandel Kramer, Patricia Elliott, Bob Dryden, Catherine Byers, Nat Polen
366	173	"The Sealed Room Murder"	Himan Brown	Ian Martin	October 23, 1975
A sheriff and a county clerk take on the onerous task of solving the murder of the county's most repulsive resident, diving into the victim's character while determining how the murderer managed to exit from a remote crime scene that was locked from the inside. Starring: Howard Da Silva, Fred Gwynne; Adapted from a short story by M. D. Post
367	174	"The Summer People"	Himan Brown	Bob Juhren	October 24, 1975
Seeking a place to pursue their artistic crafts during the summer, Jane and Mike Slater discover Granville, a town the couple learn is difficult to leave behind... no matter how much one tries. Starring: Grace Matthews, Tony Roberts
368	175	"A Living Corpse"	Himan Brown	Ian Martin	October 27, 1975
Professor Amadeus Valdemar, an expert on hypnosis who's dying of consumption, talks Dr. Craig Nugent into hypnotizing him to forestall the Grim Reaper. But what Dr. Nugent doesn't realize is that it's a vindictive plan by Professor Valdemar against his unfaithful wife... who's having an affair with Dr. Nugent. Starring: Robert Dryden, Kurt Peterson, Patricia Elliott
369	176	"The Storm Breeder"	Himan Brown	Ian Martin	October 28, 1975
A young judge aims to give rest to a lost soul who, with his young daughter, has been cursed to forever wander New England in search of a home while a dark stormcloud follows. Starring: Michael Tolan, Fred Gwynne, Anne Pitoniak, James Felt, Ian Martin; Adapted from a story by William Austin
370	177	"Ghost Powder"	Himan Brown	Sam Dann	October 29, 1975
As his political rivalry with Thomas Jefferson grows, John Adams has another matter on his plate: The French chateau he and wife Abigail have moved into is haunted. Starring: Michael Wager, Marian Seldes
371	178	"Triptych for a Witch"	Himan Brown	Ian Martin	October 30, 1975
A witch masquerades as the kindly, recently widowed great aunt of a newlywed couple, and moves in to their home along with a pair of peculiarly behaving pets. Starring: Margaret Hamilton, Evelyn Juster, Kristoffer Tabori, Gilbert Mack
372	179	"It's Hell to Pay the Piper"	Himan Brown	Ian Martin	October 31, 1975
A poor Scottish farmer pays his rent but fails to get a receipt from his feudal landlord, who later dies. When the landlord's son demands that the farmer clear his debt, a witch steps up to help the farmer gain proof from the landlord directly. Starring: Ian Martin, Bryna Raeburn, Guy Sorel, Court Benson, Arnold Moss; Adapted from the Walter Scott novel Redgauntlet

=== November ===
No. overall	No. in season	Title	Directed by	Written by	Original release date
373	180	"The Mortgage"	Himan Brown	Sam Dann	November 3, 1975
A college professor becomes deeply worried when his picture appears in the newspaper for his doing a good deed: It may lead to his being activated as a Russian double agent, disrupting his happily placid life. Starring: Larry Haines
374	181	"The Edge of the Scalpel"	Himan Brown	Ian Martin	November 5, 1975
Dr. Kirk Malcolm faces a dilemma: Perform a complicated yet life-saving surgical procedure on the husband of the nurse he loves... or be branded as a murderer if he doesn't. Starring: Teri Keane, Gordon Gould, Robert Kaliban, Don Scardino, Joan Shay
375	182	"Killing Valley"	Himan Brown	Sam Dann	November 7, 1975
Polly Preston returns to the small town she grew up in to write a tell-all exposé about the powerful people who ostracized her parents years earlier, but the dirt she digs up reveals some surprising facts. Starring: Kim Hunter, Joan Shay, William Redfield, Ian Martin
376	183	"The Public Avenger"	Himan Brown	Sam Dann	November 10, 1975
A business executive's assistant is alarmed when it's theorized that a mild-mannered colleague may be the vigilante who's been murdering several well-known criminals. Starring: Marian Hailey, Arnold Stang, Robert Dryden, Leon Janney
377	184	"Party Girl"	Himan Brown	Sam Dann	November 11, 1975
A Congressman and gubernatorial candidate tries to cover up the suicide of a prostitute he had a tryst with, telling his good friend (a police sergeant) that the death may have been at the hands of an unknown assailant. Starring: Russell Horton, Mason Adams
378	185	"Home Is Where the Ghost Is"	Himan Brown	Murray Burnett	November 13, 1975
Dr. Ramsey Joslin is haunted by the ghost of his late wife, Emily, who advises her to be careful in handling a defecting Russian scientist. Starring: Gordon Gould, Patricia Elliott, William Redfield, Gilbert Mack
379	186	"The Money Makers"	Himan Brown	Fielden Farrington	November 14, 1975
Two counterfeiters set up their secret operation in an abandoned house, unaware that it's inhabited by a ghost of the man who owned it 100 years ago... and isn't afraid to tip off the wife of one of the crooks. Starring: Ralph Bell, William Redfield, Bryna Raeburn, Jack Grimes
380	187	"The Moonlighter"	Himan Brown	Sam Dann	November 17, 1975
Needing extra cash to help satiate his wife's extravagant tastes, Stanley Morrison learns from his buddy of a way they can double their incomes — by working as hit men for a criminal syndicate. Starring: Howard Da Silva, Joan Lovejoy, Robert Kaliban, Robert Dryden
381	188	"Fear"	Himan Brown	Elspeth Eric	November 19, 1975
Diminutive teller Edgar Ellerbe is accused of robbing another branch of his own bank. Sure, the security footage shows a thief that looks like Edgar, but the crook is noticeably taller. As police search for clues (and find some possibly incriminating evidence), Edgar frets over the reality that he may have an evil doppelganger. Starring: Jack Grimes, Marian Seldes, Earl Hammond, Jane White
382	189	"Lamps of the Devil"	Himan Brown	Sam Dann	November 20, 1975
Noah Artwright returns home from fighting in the Civil War to find his fiancée has married someone else... and that his job as a whaler has been made obsolete by the discovery of crude oil. Starring: Kristoffer Tabori
383	190	"The Hanging Judgement"	Himan Brown	Ian Martin	November 21, 1975
Dr. Sam Grant and his girlfriend, Sherril Stafford, are both charged with the murder of Grant's wife. Though they admit to a possible motive (a heated argument with the victim over Dr. Grant's seeking a divorce), the pair swear to their attorney that they did not commit the crime. Starring: Mandel Kramer, Kenneth Harvey, Joan Shay, Leon Janney, Earl Hammond
384	191	"The Serpent's Tooth"	Himan Brown	Sam Dann	November 24, 1975
In pre-World War I Vienna, art dealer Jacob Kohn and wife Rachel give temporary shelter to a young, homeless artist who is sickly, behaving oddly... and is driven by disturbing visions Rachel believes foretell death. Only later do the Kohns realize that they did history a grave disservice when they took "Addie" in. Starring: Norman Rose, Ann Sheppard, Paul Hecht, Robert Dryden
385	192	"The Lap of the Gods"	Himan Brown	Ian Martin	November 25, 1975
Drowning his sorrow in alcohol since his wife's death puts Walter Davis into a coma and into a hospital... where is spirit transfers from the present day into the body of a sea captain in the 1820s. Starring: Larry Haines
386	193	"The Dead, Dead Ringer"	Himan Brown	Ian Martin	November 27, 1975
"You can be replaced." Mob boss Mario Procacci asks private eye Bruce Hart to deliver a warning message to the lothario husband of Procacci's daughter, Penny. When Hart does so, he finds an innocent Penny holding a smoking gun over her spouse's dead body... which bears an uncanny resemblance to Hart. Starring: Don Scardino, Leon Janney, Evelyn Juster, Jason Beck
387	194	"The Frammis"	Himan Brown	Sam Dann	November 28, 1975
A diamond-like yet worthless piece of glass makes its way from an honest jeweler's shop to a Royal Army officer to a reigning monarch's priceless collection. But then the king asks for an appraisal on the gem... Starring: Howard Da Silva, Bryna Raeburn, Robert Dryden, Joan Shay, Ian Martin

=== December ===
No. overall	No. in season	Title	Directed by	Written by	Original release date
388	195	"With Malice Aforethought"	Himan Brown	Sidney Sloan	December 1, 1975
Insisting he was fired upon first, police sergeant Gil Robey shoots and kills a suspect during a drug bust. But no drugs or weapon were found... and as it happens, the suspect was a white kid (Robey is African American). Facing a grand jury indictment for murder, and with his colleagues and friends trying to clear his name, Robey and his wife are subject to threatening phone calls... and one mysterious proposition. Starring: Carlos Carrasco, Robert Maxwell, Marian Seldes, William Redfield, Len Gochman
389	196	"Promise to Kill"	Himan Brown	Henry Slesar	December 3, 1975
A Vengeful Dave Farmer arranges to have Vernon White, who killed Farmer's wife and daughter, slain in prison. When White escapes and Farmer comes face-to-face with him, Farmer learns about what actually happened that awful day. Starring: Gordon Gould, Russell Horton
390	197	"Portrait of a Killer"	Himan Brown	Ian Martin	December 4, 1975
An elderly man stands in quiet fascination at a museum painting believed to be the last remaining artwork of an obscure artist. The man learns he can project himself into the illustration... and possibly alter the tragic history behind it. Starring: Michael Wager
391	198	"Pharaoh's Daughter"	Himan Brown	Sam Dann	December 5, 1975
Leonore Drake and her paramour frame a hapless drunkard for their murder of a taxi driver who discovered Drake's millionaire husband dead in his cab. Starring: Joan Shea, Jordan Charney, Jack Grimes, Ian Martin, Nat Polen
392	199	"How Quiet the Night"	Himan Brown	Sam Dann	December 8, 1975
Russell Porter kills former girlfriend Corajean Buxton, without remorse, after she confronts him about his current engagement and he learns she was pregnant with his child. Before long, Porter begins to hear Corajean's haunting words of prose from beyond the grave. Starring: William Redfield, Marian Seldes, Patricia Elliott, Court Benson
393	200	"Stitch in Time"	Himan Brown	Sam Dann	December 9, 1975
A billionaire welcomes into his home the previously estranged niece he has not seen in 9 years. But his secretary has doubts about the girl's identity and motives... and in time she is proven correct. Starring: Leon Janney, Bryna Raeburn, Rosemary Rice, Earl Hammond
394	201	"You Can Change Your Life"	Himan Brown	Sam Dann	December 11, 1975
A police detective is bewildered by the murders of two women, but later learns of the connection they shared with a third murder victim: They all appeared as panelists on a game show 10 years ago... and that a former contestant has sought revenge on them. Starring: Ralph Bell
395	202	"Marry for Murder"	Himan Brown	Sam Dann	December 12, 1975
Two sisters with different agendas hire the same private detective to look into the affairs of the same man, who wants to marry their wealthy mother. Starring: Mandel Kramer, Patsy Bruder, Arthur Anderson, Evelyn Juster, Danny Ocko
396	203	"Burn, Witch, Burn"	Himan Brown	Ian Martin	December 15, 1975
A fictitious incident in the life of Cotton Mather, Puritan minister and intellectual during the era of the Salem witch trials, who asks an Episcopalian minister to perform an exorcism on an alleged witch. Starring: Howard Da Silva
397	204	"The Eleventh Hour"	Himan Brown	Sam Dann	December 17, 1975
Feeling guilt over how he has amassed his fortune, a wealthy business owner answers a personal ad from a woman who claims she is a being from another galaxy... and who, for a $1 million fee, can solve his business problems and give him personal peace of mind. Starring: Larry Haines, Carol Teitel
398	205	"Fireball"	Himan Brown	Sam Dann	December 18, 1975
When strange things start happening on their estate, the wife of a defense contractor is convinced the new blacksmith they've hired is actually the Roman god of fire, Vulcan. The husband doesn't believe her claims... at first. Starring: Kim Hunter, Hugh Marlowe, Guy Sorel, Earl Hammond
399	206	"The Corpse Wrote Shorthand"	Himan Brown	Roy Winsor	December 19, 1975
Bank accountant Will Crawford spent 5 years in jail for securities embezzlement, a crime he did not commit. Newly released and determined to clear his name, Crawford and a newspaper reporter question his ex-colleagues, as well as the mother of his late assistant, to try to find out who actually pulled off the fraud. Starring: Mandel Kramer
400	207	"The Image"	Himan Brown	Elspeth Eric	December 22, 1975
In a quest to perfect his image, a ruthless, self-absorbed writer forces his will upon his wife and friends. Starring: Norman Rose, William Redfield, Marian Seldes
401	208	"The Murder Market"	Himan Brown	Sam Dann	December 23, 1975
Stuck with a humdrum job and a banal fiancée, a young woman feels challenged by a dynamic business entrepreneur and begins a new career avenue... which turns into high intrigue when she becomes the prime suspect in a homicide. Starring: Rosemary Murphy
402	209	"A Christmas Carol"	Himan Brown	Ian Martin	December 24, 1975
Series host E. G. Marshall voices the role of Ebenezer Scrooge in this dramatic retelling of Charles Dickens' classic holiday ghost story. Starring: E. G. Marshall, Evie Juster, Robert Dryden, William Redfield
403	210	"License to Kill"	Himan Brown	Sidney Sloan	December 26, 1975
A woman is successful in liberating her husband from a sanitarium for the criminally insane. She insists her motives are altruistic, but it soon becomes clear that she has more sinister ideas in mind. Starring: Joan Lorring, Sidney Sloan, Larry Haines
404	211	"The Memory Killers"	Himan Brown	Sam Dann	December 29, 1975
Henry Clay Courtland travels to Munich to secure a lucrative account for his advertising firm. But ghosts from the past remind him of the true, horrendous identity of the corporation's president. Starring: Ralph Bell
405	212	"Sagamore Cottage"	Himan Brown	Bob Juhren	December 31, 1975
A young couple encounter an old woman who lives in a strange house and keeps an even stranger secret... one concerning her collection of miniature china dolls. Starring: Robert Kaliban, Carmen Matthews, Janet Waldo, Bryna Raeburn, Robert Maxwell

== Sources ==
- Payton, Gordon; Grams, Martin Jr. (January 1999), The CBS radio mystery theater: an episode guide and handbook to nine years of broadcasting, 1974-1982, McFarland & Company, Inc., ISBN 0-7864-0559-7
