= List of CBS Radio Mystery Theater episodes (1980 season) =

Season of American radio series

This is an episode list for the 1980 season of the radio drama series CBS Radio Mystery Theater. The series premiered on CBS on January 6, 1974, and ended on December 31, 1982. A set of 1,399 original episodes aired between January 1974 and December 1982. The series was broadcast every day of the week for the first six years with re-runs filling in empty slots starting in February 1974. All episodes are available free at the Internet Archive.

== List of seasons ==
Episode list	# of episodes
List of CBS Radio Mystery Theater episodes (1974 season)	193
List of CBS Radio Mystery Theater episodes (1975 season)	212
List of CBS Radio Mystery Theater episodes (1976 season)	170
List of CBS Radio Mystery Theater episodes (1977 season)	186
List of CBS Radio Mystery Theater episodes (1978 season)	176
List of CBS Radio Mystery Theater episodes (1979 season)	106
List of CBS Radio Mystery Theater episodes (1980 season)	97
List of CBS Radio Mystery Theater episodes (1981 season)	132
List of CBS Radio Mystery Theater episodes (1982 season)	127

== Episodes ==
=== January ===
No. overall	No. in season	Title	Directed by	Written by	Original release date
1044	1	"Revenge is Not Sweet"	Himan Brown	G. Frederick Lewis	January 2, 1980
A detective is called upon to examine a wealthy man's death, and begins to suspect that the deceased's oddly-behaving children may have had a role in the matter. Starring: Robert Dryden; Based on a story by Jacques Futrelle
1045	2	"The Last Days of Pompeii (First Day): City of the Dead"	Himan Brown	Gerald Keane	January 7, 1980
Adapted from Edward Bulwer-Lytton's novel, this 5-part story begins with Marcus encountering two different women upon moving to the doomed city: Lydia, who leads a movement of her fellow slaves; and Orianna, an aristocrat who, much to the chagrin of Isis' high priest, discovers Christianity. Starring: Russell Horton, Evie Juster, Kristoffer Tabori, Earl Hammond
1046	3	"The Last Days of Pompeii (Second Day): Thrown to the Lions"	Himan Brown	Gerald Keane	January 8, 1980
After Pompeii is struck by a devastating earthquake, Lydia and an Isis priest cast a love spell on Marcus to make him fall in love with Lydia; the plan backfires, however, as Marcus becomes destructive and is falsely accused of murder. Starring: Russell Horton, Evie Juster, Earl Hammond, Kristoffer Tabori, Velita Gray
1047	4	"The Last Days of Pompeii (Third Day): Half Prophet, Half Fiend"	Himan Brown	Gerald Keane	January 9, 1980
Marcus is wrongfully imprisoned by Arbaces, High Priest of Isis, who wants Orianna to himself; Orianna and Lydia, however, have other plans. Starring: Russell Horton, Ian Martin, Evie Juster, Earl Hammond
1048	5	"The Last Days of Pompeii (Fourth Day): Danger, Love and Death"	Himan Brown	Gerald Keane	January 10, 1980
Marcus is thrown to a lion, who refuses to attack; Arbaces kidnaps Orianna, with Marcus and Lydia in hot pursuit; and Mount Vesuvius erupts. Starring: Russell Horton, Earl Hammond, Ian Martin, Evie Juster, Patricia Elliott
1049	6	"The Last Days of Pompeii (Fifth Day): The Buried City"	Himan Brown	Gerald Keane	January 11, 1980
The story ends as Marcus and Orianna, with Lydia's assistance, flee a burning Pompeii, despite a great many diversions (in particular Arbaces' last attempt to take Orianna). Starring: Russell Horton, Marian Seldes, Evie Juster, Earl Hammond
1050	7	"The Better Half"	Himan Brown	Sam Dann	January 14, 1980
In a fit of jealous rage, PR executive Bobby Boyle kills his partner in business and life, the more competent Jeannie Frye... who continues to offer Bobby advice and love from the great beyond. Starring: Tony Roberts, Patricia Elliott
1051	8	"Prisoner of the Machines"	Himan Brown	Henry Slesar	January 16, 1980
In a war between humans and machines, a group of Earth soldiers are captured and sent to an asteroid prison, where the unit's commander schemes to liberate his men from their mechanical captors. Starring: John Lithgow, Earl Hammond
1052	9	"Once Upon an Island"	Himan Brown	Elspeth Eric	January 21, 1980
A newlywed couple vacationing on a Caribbean island learn of a local legend, prompting the husband to investigate it further by exploring a haunted house. Starring: Norman Rose, Diana Kirkwood, Russell Horton
1053	10	"The Forty-Four"	Himan Brown	Sam Dann	January 23, 1980
A wealthy landowner confesses to killing her cousin with a .44 Colt over an ownership dispute; when a ballistics report on the gun comes back negative, the sheriff (who carries a romantic torch for the landowner) must find the true perpetrator. Starring: John Beal, Carol Teitel
1054	11	"The God Machine"	Himan Brown	Sam Dann	January 28, 1980
In a future where a master computer regulates the institutions of marriage and procreation, a man and woman override the system by falling in love, then fight back when the machine tries to separate them. Starring: Lloyd Battista, Patricia Elliott
1055	12	"The Crystal Gazer"	Himan Brown	G. Frederick Lewis	January 30, 1980
A private eye must match wits with a wily fortune teller to learn of a woman's whereabouts; the woman vanished after the oracle told her she would be in an arranged marriage to an older man. Starring: Robert Dryden, Ian Martin, Evie Juster, Ray Owens

=== February ===
No. overall	No. in season	Title	Directed by	Written by	Original release date
1056	13	"That's What Friends Are For"	Himan Brown	Sam Dann	February 4, 1980
A British Army lieutenant in India is plagued by a ghost in his home; the bagpipe music that the spirit plays may serve as a warning regarding his pending nuptials to an army major's daughter. Starring: Tony Roberts, Earl Hammond; Suggested by a Rudyard Kipling story
1057	14	"The Deserter"	Himan Brown	James Agate, Jr.	February 6, 1980
A landslide strands a couple and their infant son in the Sierra mountains of California. Though a reclusive mountaineer is able to rescue them and help them survive, he refuses to guide them back to civilization. Starring: John Lithgow, Evie Juster, Ralph Bell
1058	15	"Talk to Me"	Himan Brown	Sam Dann	February 11, 1980
"I'm the one who got you into this; I can get you out... somehow." John J. Marlow is retired, respectful — and just desires someone to talk to. So he calls a crime tip hotline and offers detailed (but false) information on a recent murder case. But Marlowe's statement gets an innocent kid, Benny Sarafin, arrested for the crime; and actual evidence that ties Benny to the victim makes Marlowe's efforts to recant his statement all the more difficult. Starring: John Beal, Paul Hecht, Jack Grimes, Bryna Raeburn
1059	16	"Crime of Passion"	Himan Brown	Sam Dann	February 13, 1980
An expert in business law is called upon to defend a night watchman accused of murdering his wife after catching her with another man. As he builds his case, the attorney soon begins to suspect his own wife could be unfaithful as well. Starring: Mandel Kramer
1060	17	"The Time Box"	Himan Brown	G. Frederick Lewis	February 18, 1980
A newspaper reporter discovers a time machine developed in the 1880s; after using it to go back 100 years, he's called upon to save the inventor's daughter, who's engaged to a known serial killer. Starring: Russell Horton, Robert Dryden, Diana Kirkwood
1061	18	"The Vampire Plant"	Himan Brown	Ian Martin	February 20, 1980
A wimpy man marries an assertive woman, then notices that those tormenting him are starting to disappear; he suspects his wife's houseplant, a carnivorous hemo anderantus. Starring: Robert Dryden, Teri Keane, Ian Martin, Joan Shay
1062	19	"The Unseen and the Seen"	Himan Brown	Elspeth Eric	February 25, 1980
A widowed banker and aspiring artist takes measures to find out why a wedding day photo of him and his late wife is mysteriously and inexplicably moving about their house. Starring: Paul Hecht, Carol Teitel
1063	20	"The Intruder"	Himan Brown	James Agate, Jr.	February 27, 1980
Robby Melville returns home on college spring break to see his parents, scientist Dr. Phillip Melville and author Dorothy Melville. But he's not really Robby, but rather an alien lookalike from another dimension (where the real Robby is being held captive). The doppelganger offers a trade demand to the Melvilles: In exchange for their son's release, Dorothy must follow the alien to his home planet, where she must help repopulate his dying species. Starring: Norman Rose, Grace Matthews, Russell Horton; Adapted from a short story by Jules Verne

=== March ===
No. overall	No. in season	Title	Directed by	Written by	Original release date
1064	21	"Laundry Money"	Himan Brown	Sam Dann	March 3, 1980
An accountant unwittingly gets lured into a money laundering scheme, unaware it's a plot his wife and his best friend have concocted to hasten his demise. Starring: Larry Haines, Earl Hammond, Evie Juster
1065	22	"A Matter of Identity"	Himan Brown	Roy Winsor	March 5, 1980
Worried that her cousin has fallen out of contact and may have been kidnapped, Claire Reed travels to Port-au-Prince, Haiti and, with the assistance of an old beau who works at the U.S. Embassy, implores a local police detective to investigate... and discover a link to local beliefs of voodoo and human sacrifice. Starring: Heather McCray, Russell Horton
1066	23	"You're Going to Like Rodney"	Himan Brown	Bob Juhren	March 10, 1980
A couple babysitting their young nephew are tortured and harassed by his antics; they begin to suspect the child may be more malevolent than he appears to be. Starring: Tony Roberts, Patricia Elliott
1067	24	"The Secret of the Fifth Bell"	Himan Brown	G. Frederick Lewis	March 12, 1980
A woman buys her husband a set of antique Chinese bells; each time one of them rings on its own, good fortune finds one person... while death finds another. Starring: Earl Hammond, Arnold Moss, Joyce Gordon, Ian Martin; Adapted from a story by Jacques Futrelle
1068	25	"The Evil Eye"	Himan Brown	Elspeth Eric	March 17, 1980
A fiction writer believes she has an "evil eye" power upon finding that those she becomes angry with suffer misfortune or even death. Her husband and her agent, who are having an affair, hatch a plot to take advantage of her gift. Starring: Mandel Kramer, Carol Teitel, Teri Keane
1069	26	"The Death Wish"	Himan Brown	Ian Martin	March 19, 1980
A stressed-out businessman relaxes by using "rhapsodic meditation," during which he has two disturbing visions — one of his wife having an affair, the other seductions by a celestial temptress. Starring: Ralph Bell
1070	27	"The Blue Tiger"	Himan Brown	Sam Dann	March 24, 1980
Seasoned assassin Leo murders a key organized crime witness, then stays a step ahead of the authorities by silencing both his girlfriend and the district attorney she ratted out to. But Leo's next assignment surprisingly weighs heavily on his conscience: Conning an elderly woman and owner of valuable land into believing he's her long lost son. Starring: Larry Haines
1071	28	"Conspiracy"	Himan Brown	G. Frederick Lewis	March 26, 1980
A recounting of a secret plot by John Wilkes Booth and his co-conspirators to assassinate President Abraham Lincoln (after a kidnapping plot was unsuccessful) as well as Lincoln's vice president and secretary of state. Starring: Kevin McCarthy
1072	29	"The End of the Rainbow"	Himan Brown	Sam Dann	March 31, 1980
A businessman's neglected housewife gets picked up by a stranger at a singles bar, but everything goes pear-shaped when they head for a nearby town that's infamous for its gambling. Starring: Teri Keane, Mandel Kramer, Robert Kaliban

=== April ===
No. overall	No. in season	Title	Directed by	Written by	Original release date
1073	30	"The Fateful Bell"	Himan Brown	Ian Martin	April 2, 1980
In 15th century China, a lowly artisan attempts to fulfill an emperor's request to cast a gigantic bell that can be heard for miles, while seeking to win the heart and hand of the princess who loves him. Starring: Kristoffer Tabori, Evie Juster, Ian Martin; Adapted from a story by Lafcadio Hearn
1074	31	"Madame Sirocco"	Himan Brown	Sam Dann	April 7, 1980
Stumped and getting no help in a missing person case, a police detective enlists the help of the titular psychic... whom he also knows as a con artist. Starring: Bryna Raeburn, Earl Hammond, William Griffis, Joyce Gordon
1075	32	"Kitty"	Himan Brown	Henry Slesar	April 9, 1980
Police determine whether a series of deaths by what appears to be cat scratches are connected with a dancer and her sister/roommate, who share an affinity for felines. Starring: Teri Keane, Catherine Byers, Robert Kaliban, Russell Horton
1076	33	"Star Sapphire"	Himan Brown	Elspeth Eric	April 14, 1980
After adopting a teenage girl to assist his wheelchair-using spouse and help tend to their farm, a man teaches the girl how to hunt and kill through his use of the hypnotic sapphire ring she's become obsessed with. Starring: Fred Gwynne, Evelyn Juster, Carol Teitel
1077	34	"The Face in the Coffin"	Himan Brown	James Agate, Jr.	April 16, 1980
Tim & Cathy Doyle visit a funeral home to pay respects to their late aunt, but unwittingly view the body of a federal judge presiding over an organized crime case; their inadvertent error puts the Doyles' lives in danger. Starring: Kristoffer Tabori, Roberta Maxwell, Robert Kaliban, Fred Gwynne
1078	35	"The Fourth Reason"	Himan Brown	Sam Dann	April 21, 1980
A woman enlists a congressman's aid after her husband fails to return from a business trip to Paris; the politician, however, uses the case to propel his aspirations for higher office. Starring: John Lithgow, Teri Keane
1079	36	"The Dead You Can't Bury"	Himan Brown	Ian Martin	April 23, 1980
A fortune teller warns a young woman that a man in her future portends doom. Just as predicted, the woman meets (and falls in love with) that man, despite nightmares she has of a spirit warning her of further danger. Starring: Jada Rowland
1080	37	"Portrait of a Memory"	Himan Brown	James Agate, Jr.	April 28, 1980
A wealthy woman hires a starving American artist in Paris to paint a portrait of a man she once loved — based only on his own vision of the man (as the woman refuses to provide a picture of her beloved). Starring: Norman Rose, Marian Seldes
1081	38	"How Can I Ever Thank You"	Himan Brown	Sam Dann	April 30, 1980
An arrogant novelist recalls how, thanks to a devilish deal, he gained revenge on his unfaithful wife and his once-grateful former protégé... without committing the murder for which he now stands accused. Starring: Mandel Kramer

=== May ===
No. overall	No. in season	Title	Directed by	Written by	Original release date
1082	39	"Inner Eye"	Himan Brown	Elspeth Eric	May 5, 1980
Using the power of postcognition, a young woman tries to save the life of her ex-lover when she has visions that he's on the verge of doing something rash. Starring: Roberta Maxwell
1083	40	"Wanted, a Husband"	Himan Brown	G. Frederick Lewis	May 7, 1980
Two grifters set up a mail order scam for men seeking a mate, with widowed restaurant cook Wilhelmina and a hefty "bank account" as lures. Everything goes well, until a postal inspector becomes suspicious... and Wilhelmina falls for one of the applicants. Starring: Fred Gwynne, Ian Martin, Bryna Raeburn; Adapted from O. Henry's short story "The Exact Science of Matrimony"
1084	41	"Tomorrow Is Never"	Himan Brown	James Agate, Jr.	May 12, 1980
Years after they first met on a European expedition, a worldly traveler learns a spinster teacher is being taken advantage of by ill-mannered relatives, and vows to help her reclaim her life. Starring: Marian Seldes, Larry Haines; Adapted from the Henry James novel The Aspern Papers
1085	42	"On the Side of the Angels"	Himan Brown	Ian Martin	May 14, 1980
A traveling salesman helps free a demoralized woman from the psychologically dark clutches of her evil family. Starring: Earl Hammond, Evie Juster
1086	43	"Two of a Kind"	Himan Brown	Henry Slesar	May 19, 1980
Two identically furnished apartments are part of a lazy, selfish man's effort to drive his aunt insane and relieve her of her wealth. Starring: Kristoffer Tabori, Martha Greenhouse, Russell Horton
1087	44	"A Private Demon"	Himan Brown	Sam Dann	May 21, 1980
An absent-minded college professor murders a Ph.D. candidate, and then feigns innocence, after the student provides evidence that refutes his theories. A battle of wits then ensues between the professor, his housekeeper, and a police detective investigating the crime. Starring: Norman Rose, Carol Teitel, Robert Kaliban
1088	45	"Phantom World"	Himan Brown	Ian Martin	May 26, 1980
A British aristocrat and a former military officer, both condemned to die for treason, find themselves shipwrecked on a deserted island, where they find love, romance... and a deranged Frenchman. Starring: Marian Seldes, Lloyd Battista, Robert Maxwell, Court Benson
1089	46	"The Bluff"	Himan Brown	Henry Slesar	May 28, 1980
A blind ex-cop uses himself as bait to exact revenge on the man who ruined his and his wife's lives. Starring: Larry Haines, Earl Hammond, Roberta Maxwell

=== June ===
No. overall	No. in season	Title	Directed by	Written by	Original release date
1090	47	"Let George Do It"	Himan Brown	Sam Dann	June 2, 1980
For a salesman traveling in New England, what starts with a car needing repairs turns into a seduction by a shopkeeper who, like him, is unhappily married — and who'd like his help in murdering her husband. Starring: Russell Horton, Evie Juster, Ian Martin
1091	48	"Obsession"	Himan Brown	Elspeth Eric	June 4, 1980
A mystery writer asks an old friend, a police chief, to incarcerate him, believing it's the only way to prevent him from committing a felonious crime. Starring: Robert Dryden, Mandel Kramer
1092	49	"That Magic Touch"	Himan Brown	Sam Dann	June 9, 1980
An actress divorces her cold, emotionally distant producer-husband, but they decide to reunite and reconcile at a remote lodge at Christmastime. That's when past issues resurface and cause trouble. Starring: Marian Seldes, Michael Tolan
1093	50	"Legacy of Guilt"	Himan Brown	Ian Martin	June 11, 1980
After removing an antique from the attic, a pregnant woman is visited by a female specter, who not only tells of the house's previous owners, but also asks the woman to help her find her lost child. Starring: Roberta Maxwell, Bryna Raeburn, Russell Horton
1094	51	"Voice from the Grave"	Himan Brown	Roy Winsor	June 16, 1980
Supposedly based on a true-life tale, this story finds a detective obtaining a peculiar form of assistance in solving a lab technician's murder — through the help of a doctor's wife who can speak in the victim's voice while in her sleep. Starring: Earl Hammond, Court Benson, Carol Teitel
1095	52	"In the Name of Love"	Himan Brown	Sam Dann	June 18, 1980
A powerful ad agency president lives a fantasy of being mother to a famous actress. When that "daughter" goes missing, she asks a wealthy client for help in solving the disappearance. Starring: Teri Keane, Norman Rose
1096	53	"Life Blood"	Himan Brown	Murray Burnett	June 23, 1980
An embittered and vengeful physicist creates a lifelike female robot, Amelia, whose sole purpose is to seduce and destroy an old colleague who mistreated him in the past. Starring: Joan Beal, Marian Seldes
1097	54	"The Sweet Smell of Murder"	Himan Brown	Sam Dann	June 25, 1980
After her husband is caught red-handed with stolen loot from a robbery, a charter boat captain's wife works with a police investigator to prove his innocence. Starring: Bryna Raeburn, Robert Dryden, Joe Silver, Evie Juster
1098	55	"The Old Maid Murders"	Himan Brown	Sam Dann	June 30, 1980
A secretary falls secretly in love with her boss, and then must protect him from his worst impulses when she learns he may be a double agent working with an enemy government. Starring: Tammy Grimes, Norman Rose, Court Benson, Earl Hammond

=== July ===
No. overall	No. in season	Title	Directed by	Written by	Original release date
1099	56	"Maud-Evelyn"	Himan Brown	G. Frederick Lewis	July 2, 1980
Peter Harkness was once obsessed with marrying his fiancée; now, the travel guide has a new love — the beloved daughter of clients who has been dead for 10 years. Starring: Paul Hecht, Carol Teitel, Lloyd Battista; Based on the story by Henry James
1100	57	"Silent Partners"	Himan Brown	Sam Dann	July 7, 1980
A wealthy businessman and his secretary are kidnapped in South America; a daring escape from their captors is only the start of their adventure. Starring: Mandel Kramer, Marian Seldes, Gilbert Mack
1101	58	"Sierra Alpha 638"	Himan Brown	Ian Martin	July 9, 1980
A cult leader and his followers hijack an El Paso-to-Mexico City flight so that he can pick up a supply of marijuana in the California desert. Starring: Robert Dryden
1102	59	"Nightmare in Gillette Castle"	Himan Brown	Elizabeth Pennell	July 14, 1980
A vacationing couple find themselves trapped overnight in the castle home of a late movie actor who once portrayed Sherlock Holmes — and in the middle of a murder investigation led by the famous sleuth himself! Starring: Kevin McCarthy, Jada Rowland
1103	60	"Murder Preferred"	Himan Brown	Henry Slesar	July 16, 1980
A widow fakes a crime scene to make her husband's suicide look like a murder; but when an innocent man is accused of the crime, she confesses her deception to the lawyer she's hired to help clear the man's name. Starring: Teri Keane, Tony Roberts, Earl Hammond, Court Benson
1104	61	"A Ton of Gold"	Himan Brown	Sam Dann	July 28, 1980
An archaeologist, his team, and an Indian guide search for lost tribal gold in the New Mexico desert, and learn first-hand of the curse that envelops the treasure. Starring: Earl Hammond, Ralph Bell
1105	62	"The Death Disk"	Himan Brown	Sam Dann	July 30, 1980
A job applicant conducts her own investigation into the theft of a rare artifact from a charitable organization, who believes she is responsible for the crime and resultingly withdrew their employment offer to her — but it's a heist she did not commit. Starring: Tammy Grimes

=== August ===
No. overall	No. in season	Title	Directed by	Written by	Original release date
1106	63	"This Deadly Fraternity"	Himan Brown	Ian Martin	August 4, 1980
A college fraternity alum is reluctant to attend its reunion celebration, as memories of his involvement in a horrific act during the frat's "Hell Week" still haunt him years later. Starring: Jack Grimes
1107	64	"The Mysterious Hanging of Squire Huggins"	Himan Brown	James Agate, Jr.	August 6, 1980
A young artist embellishes the details of a squire's murder, then winds up becoming the primary suspect in the crime. Starring: Paul Hecht; Adapted from a story by Nathaniel Hawthorne
1108	65	"The Master Minds"	Himan Brown	G. Frederick Lewis	August 11, 1980
A Boston detective works with Scotland Yard to catch a master jewel thief who has stolen priceless diamonds and is in the process of sailing from England to the U.S. Starring: Carol Teitel, Russell Horton, Court Benson; Adapted from a story by Jacques Futrelle
1109	66	"The Return of Edward Blair"	Himan Brown	Roy Winsor	August 13, 1980
A man returns to his home town one rainy night but is greeted with hostility by its residents, who mistake him for a criminal who committed an unspeakable act and escaped justice years earlier. Starring: John Lithgow, Joan Shay, Robert Dryden, Earl Hammond
1110	67	"Human Error"	Himan Brown	Elspeth Eric	August 18, 1980
His inattentive driving causes Harry Margolies to get in an accident that puts a young woman in the hospital; Harry soon finds himself attracted to her and makes up reasons to see her, much to his friend's consternation. Starring: Larry Haines, Jack Grimes, Evie Juster
1111	68	"Kill Now, Pay Later"	Himan Brown	Sam Dann	August 20, 1980
The normally spineless Stuart Belden professes his love for a diner waitress, Maude Henderson. But that only raises the ire of his domineering aunt, Melisande, whose threat to cut Stuart off from the family fortune only strengthens his bond with Maude... but also, just as the town sheriff had feared, leads to a deadly clash of wills. Starring: Tony Roberts, Fred Gwynne, Bryna Raeburn, Teri Keane
1112	69	"Poor Lester"	Himan Brown	Sam Dann	August 25, 1980
Juliet Keyworth wishes it was she who had died in an auto accident and not the agronomist husband, Lester, she believed still had so much to give to the world. But Zeus is there to grant her wish. Now, from the afterlife, Juliet gets to see Lester become well respected... while he falls for her best friend's romantic advances. Starring: Teri Keane, Norman Rose, Joyce Gordon, Earl Hammond
1113	70	"A Feast of Death"	Himan Brown	Elspeth Eric	August 27, 1980
In 1917 Paris, a penniless seamstress marries an older, richer entrepreneur... but becomes appalled when she unexpectedly discovers what he does to earn his wealth. Starring: Jada Rowland, Robert Dryden, Joan Lovejoy, Ray Owens

=== September ===
No. overall	No. in season	Title	Directed by	Written by	Original release date
1114	71	"The Power of Zeus"	Himan Brown	James Agate, Jr.	September 1, 1980
With a massive hole in the ozone layer jeopardizing Earth's food supply, two scientists are dispatched to a remote planet, Zeus, where they must deal with a leader who's arrogant, egotistical... and speaks in a Texas-style drawl. Starring: Russell Horton, Earl Hammond, Court Benson, Tracy Ellis, Patricia Elliott
1115	72	"Leave Well Enough Alone"	Himan Brown	Sam Dann	September 3, 1980
The French novelist Guy de Maupassant serves as marriage counselor to a couple he is friends with; it leads to one of his more famous short stories. Starring: John Beal, Tracy Ellis, Court Benson
1116	73	"Hand in Glove"	Himan Brown	Nancy Moore	September 8, 1980
A shootout in a hospital leaves mass murderer Jed Gant dead and Dr. Dan Crane with an irreparably damaged hand. Dr. Crane then receives Gant's hand in a transplant... but a vengeful Gant isn't done with that hand just yet. Starring: Russell Horton, Diana Kirkwood, Mandel Kramer
1117	74	"Ocean of Emptiness"	Himan Brown	Arnold Moss	September 10, 1980
A married couple pilot the first crewed mission from Earth to Jupiter (three days at near-light speed). But peculiar things occur once in orbit, including their receiving a radio message reporting their deaths. All that's nothing compared to what they discover when they return home. Starring: Paul Hecht, Teri Keane
1118	75	"Number One"	Himan Brown	Sam Dann	September 15, 1980
A movie shoot in a Central American mountain range is disrupted when a warlord (the region's "Numero Uno") takes the crew hostage. The warlord will let the crew go on one condition — that he be allowed to spend one night with the producer/star's wife... who may be willing to take him up on the offer. Starring: Larry Haines, Evie Juster, Earl Hammond
1119	76	"The Threshold"	Himan Brown	G. Frederick Lewis	September 17, 1980
An enigmatic married couple purchase an abandoned Montana town long contaminated by radioactivity. When invisible hands begin to rebuild the town back to its glory days, the neighboring town's mayor and a scientist-turned-hardware store owner become suspicious. Starring: Fred Gwynne, Robert Dryden, Bryna Raeburn, Ian Martin
1120	77	"The Mysterious Rochdale Special"	Himan Brown	Murray Burnett	September 22, 1980
Believing it will get him off the hook for the cold-blooded murder he was recently witnessed committing, Herbert Lernac confesses to an even bigger, more baffling, and unsolved crime — the disappearance years earlier of a train traveling from Liverpool to London. Starring: Ralph Bell, Ian Martin; Adapted from Arthur Conan Doyle's "The Story of the Lost Special"
1121	78	"The Murder of Caesar"	Himan Brown	G. Frederick Lewis	September 24, 1980
The texts of Plutarch, Cicero, and Plutonius are the basis for this telling of Julius Caesar's final days, when after consolidating his hold on the Roman Empire he's strongly warned to "beware the Ides of March."; Starring: Paul Hecht, Earl Hammond, Joan Shay, Gordon Gould
1122	79	"The Ruby Lamp"	Himan Brown	Elspeth Eric	September 29, 1980
A college professor creates a device that can photograph a person's thoughts; he uses the device to help his friend's deeply depressed wife, who wants the answer to one question — the whereabouts of her stillborn twin infants. Starring: Mandel Kramer, Teri Keane, John Beal

=== October ===
No. overall	No. in season	Title	Directed by	Written by	Original release date
1123	80	"Hero's Welcome"	Himan Brown	Sam Dann	October 1, 1980
Six years after being rescued at sea by the natives of a Pacific paradise, a shipwrecked amnesiac regains his memory and begins yearning for home. When he returns there, he discovers his wife, and the town as a whole, have gained monetary and cultural wealth on the belief that he's dead. Starring: Tony Roberts
1124	81	"Second Sight"	Himan Brown	Sam Dann	October 6, 1980
Safecracker Arthur "Fingers" Dickson blinds a police detective who catches him burglarizing a millionaire's safe. When Dickson is later arrested for the millionaire's murder, the detective comes out of retirement to prove that Dickson was set up for the killing. Starring: Fred Gwynne, Robert Maxwell, Carol Teitel, Earl Hammond
1125	82	"Portrait of an Assassin"	Himan Brown	James Agate, Jr.	October 8, 1980
The life of Charles Guiteau, the man responsible for assassinating James A. Garfield after grandiosely believing he helped to get Garfield elected President of the United States. Starring: John Lithgow, Patricia Elliott
1126	83	"Napoleon and the Queen of Sheba"	Himan Brown	Sam Dann	October 13, 1980
Two good witches try to help a small-time con artist stop his life of crime. Starring: Kristoffer Tabori, Evie Juster, Ian Martin, Court Benson
1127	84	"The Bright Golden Murders"	Himan Brown	Sam Dann	October 15, 1980
A nuclear scientist's widow turns to his friend and the police for help in proving her husband was murdered for discovering a great metallurgical secret... though he may actually have been offed by the jealous mobster boyfriend of his cabaret singer mistress. Starring: Tammy Grimes, Russell Horton, Martha Greenhouse, Ray Owens
1128	85	"Honest Mistake"	Himan Brown	Sam Dann	October 20, 1980
An aging hit man agrees to kill an accountant who's ready to testify at trial, but the hired gun may be after the wrong person with a similar name. Starring: Earl Hammond, Ian Martin, Evelyn Juster
1129	86	"Confession"	Himan Brown	G. Fredrick Lewis	October 22, 1980
Wheeling-dealing businessman Edgar Saville turns time with his easy-going brother, David, at a vacation resort into a confrontation with his dishonest broker. But David's attraction to the broker's daughter may complicate things. Starring: Paul Hecht, Fred Gwynne, Norman Rose, Veleka Gray
1130	87	"The Gilbert Stuart"	Himan Brown	James Agate, Jr.	October 27, 1980
An art appraiser is talked into assigning value to and purchasing a painting that he's certain is not the work of a famous artist, even though a museum benefactor he works for believes it to be the real deal. Starring: Gordon Gould, Carol Teitel, Lloyd Battista, Tracy Ellis; Based on Edith Wharton's short story "The Rembrandt"
1131	88	"Bloodline"	Himan Brown	Sam Dann	October 29, 1980
Stockbroker Lewis Olcutt tells of a scam involving his familial lineage, which led him to embezzle $2 million from his investment firm's ledgers. Starring: John Lithgow

=== November ===
No. overall	No. in season	Title	Directed by	Written by	Original release date
1132	89	"Guilty"	Himan Brown	G. Frederick Lewis	November 3, 1980
A has-been playwright kills his uncle, but has difficulty convincing his relatives and a police detective of his motive: Using the uncle's wealth to fund his ailing sister's medical treatments. Starring: Paul Hecht, Joyce Gordon, Lloyd Battista, Ray Owens; Adapted from a short story by Edith Wharton
1133	90	"The Question"	Himan Brown	Elspeth Eric	November 5, 1980
Seeking to regain a sense of self, actress Mary Mannering leaves a long-running Broadway role to return to her family's seaside estate... where its caretaker and a mysterious fan of her work help lead Mary on a self-discovery journey. Starring: Teri Keane, Kristoffer Tabori, Robert Dryden
1134	91	"The Dagger of Almohades"	Himan Brown	Murray Burnett	November 10, 1980
A cunning woman who delights in seeing men fight each other to the death for her amusement meets her match in a man who possesses an ancient dagger. Starring: John Lithgow, Patricia Elliott, Court Benson, Earl Hammond; Adapted from a story by Arthur Conan Doyle
1135	92	"Natural Sugar"	Himan Brown	Sam Dann	November 12, 1980
Cranky actor Emmett Brundage is murdered every night on stage with a poisoned drink... until one night his death is all too real. It's up to a police detective to sort through various scenarios to determine the killer and their motive. Starring: Fred Gwynne
1136	93	"The Eleventh Plague"	Himan Brown	Henry Slesar	November 17, 1980
A U.S. Space Command crew must apprehend a former stage magician/hypnotist marooned on a distant planet for 15 years. But the man now fancies himself as a maniacal potentate, using god-like "powers" to visit biblical-style plagues upon the crew unless they heed his command to depart. Starring: Russell Horton, Ian Martin, Lloyd Battista
1137	94	"The Iron Horse"	Himan Brown	Sam Dann	November 19, 1980
In mid-1800s Central Europe, a chance meeting between a downtrodden dreamer and a con artist leads to riches for both; was it due to their ingenuity... or just plain luck? Starring: Norman Rose, Bryna Raeburn, Evie Juster, Robert Dryden
1138	95	"The Killer Instinct"	Himan Brown	Sam Dann	November 24, 1980
A police detective investigates a series of strange deaths, all of which had unusual circumstances and the involvement of a smooth-talking salesman. Starring: Teri Keane, Martha Greenhouse, Ralph Bell
1139	96	"Breakout"	Himan Brown	James Agate, Jr.	November 26, 1980
Two French flying aces escape from a German POW camp during the First World War, with Holland the destination they have in mind. But a farm house they take shelter in may prove to be either a safe haven or a trap. Starring: Paul Hecht, Bob Kaliban

=== December ===
No. overall	No. in season	Title	Directed by	Written by	Original release date
1140	97	"A Holiday Visit"	Himan Brown	Bob Juhren	December 25, 1980
Waylaid by an accident on their way to visit family for Christmas, Skip and Joan Bartram find shelter in a deserted town that contains only one resident (a mysterious old woman) and many forgotten memories for Joan. Starring: Lloyd Battista, Diana Kirkwood

== Sources ==
- Payton, Gordon; Grams, Martin Jr. (January 1999), The CBS radio mystery theater: an episode guide and handbook to nine years of broadcasting, 1974-1982, McFarland & Company, Inc., ISBN 0-7864-0559-7
