= Elspeth Eric =

American actress (1907–1993)

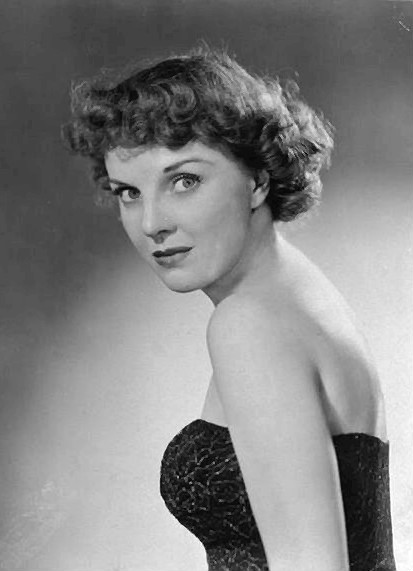
- Elspeth Eric in 1943
- Born: Elspeth Thexton Eric; September 15, 1907; Chicago, Illinois, U.S.
- Died: June 15, 1993 (aged 85); Manhattan, New York City, U.S.
- Education: Wellesley College
- Occupations: Actress, Writer
- Known for: Joyce Jordan, M.D.

Elspeth Thexton Eric (September 15, 1907 – June 15, 1993) was an American actress in old-time radio, "usually cast as the other woman in soaps and serials".

== Early years ==
The daughter of a doctor, Elspeth Thexton Eric was born in Chicago, Illinois. She attended Bradford Academy and graduated from Wellesley College with a double major in economics and English literature. After hearing tales of woe about "girls who had tried to crash the great White Way and failed, she enrolled in a business school and left word with her friends in New York to let her know when a job was to be had there."

She garnered some acting experience in summer stock theatre and moved back to New York, where she worked at various jobs for five years while she tried to find work as an actor. During those years, "She was a switchboard operator, waitress, governess, hostess in a cocktail lounge, publicity writer, model, cook, parlor maid, social secretary to a social secretary, stenographer and book saleswoman."

== Radio ==
Eric's initial work on radio came in Big Sister and Aunt Jenny's Real Life Stories. Her roles on radio programs included those shown in the table below.

Program	Role
Betty and Bob	Jane Hartford
Big Sister	Diane Carvell
Central City	Emily Olson
The Falcon	Nancy
Joyce Jordan, Girl Interne	Joyce Jordan
Lorenzo Jones	Irma Barker
Road of Life	Beth Lambert; Lil Monet
The Second Mrs. Burton	Lillian Anderson
Valiant Lady	Eleanor Richards
Young Doctor Malone	Marsha; Lucia Standish
Crime Club - Murder Rents a Room	Kitty

Other programs on which Eric appeared included The Haunting Hour, The FBI in Peace and War, Abbott Mysteries, Ever Since Eve, Front Page Farrell, Quick as a Flash, Rosemary, Mommie and the Men, Inner Sanctum Mystery, Bulldog Drummond, Manhattan at Midnight, Green Valley, U.S.A., Gang Busters, 21st Precinct, Grand Central Station, and Mr. District Attorney.

== Stage ==
Eric gained early acting experience with the Woodstock Summer Theatre. In 1932, she acted in the troupe at the Westchester Playhouse at Mount Kisco, New York.

Her Broadway credits include The Live Wire, Snafu, Margin for Error, Too Many Heroes, and Dead End.

== Television ==
Eric had the role of Lil Monte in the Road of Life soap opera, which was broadcast on TV and radio in 1955, with the same cast. She also appeared in "His Name Was Death," an episode of Robert Montgomery Presents (March 18, 1957), "Young Man Adam," an episode of Studio One (December 29, 1952), and "The Unfraid," an episode of The Web (November 23, 1952).

In a 1955 newspaper article, Eric indicated her preference for working in radio. "There are no ulcers in radio," she said. The reporter noted, "She reports her eight radio shows a week are easier than one a week on TV, and leave her more time to herself."

== Later years ==
In the late 1970s, Eric wrote over 100 scripts for CBS Radio Mystery Theater and The General Mills Radio Adventure Theater. One of her scripts, "The Black Room," was published (in "novelized" form) in a book, along with two other stories from CBSRMT. Strange Tales From CBS Radio Mystery Theater was published in 1976 by Popular Library.

== Death ==
Eric died of cancer in Manhattan in 1993, aged 85.
