= List of CBS Radio Mystery Theater episodes (1974 season) =

Season of American radio series

This is an episode list for the 1974 season of the radio drama series CBS Radio Mystery Theater. The series premiered on CBS on January 6, 1974, and ended on December 31, 1982. A set of 1,399 original episodes aired between January 1974 and December 1982. The series was broadcast every day of the week for the first six years with re-runs filling in empty slots starting in February 1974. All episodes are available for free at the Internet Archive, on YouTube, and with a subscription on Spotify.

== List of seasons ==
Episode list	# of episodes
List of CBS Radio Mystery Theater episodes (1974 season)	193
List of CBS Radio Mystery Theater episodes (1975 season)	212
List of CBS Radio Mystery Theater episodes (1976 season)	170
List of CBS Radio Mystery Theater episodes (1977 season)	186
List of CBS Radio Mystery Theater episodes (1978 season)	176
List of CBS Radio Mystery Theater episodes (1979 season)	106
List of CBS Radio Mystery Theater episodes (1980 season)	97
List of CBS Radio Mystery Theater episodes (1981 season)	132
List of CBS Radio Mystery Theater episodes (1982 season)	127

== Episodes ==
=== January ===
No. overall	No. in season	Title	Directed by	Written by	Original release date
1	1	"The Old Ones Are Hard to Kill"	Himan Brown	Henry Slesar	January 6, 1974
A spry woman in her golden years rents a room to an ailing boarder with a peculiar confession to make. Starring: Agnes Moorehead, Leon Janney, Roger De Koven
2	2	"The Return of the Moresbys"	Himan Brown	Henry Slesar	January 7, 1974
Richard Moresby murders his wife after she bequeaths her fortune to a religious guru he finds suspicious, but strange animal behaviors lead Richard to believe she's seeking retribution from beyond the grave. Starring: Patrick O'Neal, Marian Seldes, Nick Pryor, Dan Ocko
3	3	"The Bullet"	Himan Brown	Sam Dann	January 8, 1974
A Vietnam War veteran reunites with the good friend he served with; the problem is that the friend was killed during the war... and has returned from the grave for a reason. Starring: Larry Haines, Evie Juster, Ralph Bell, Martin Newman, Leon Janney, Dan Ocko
4	4	"Lost Dog"	Himan Brown	Henry Slesar	January 9, 1974
A woman with a phobia of dogs learns to befriend the fierce canine her husband brought home... and teaches the dog to turn against him. Starring: Kim Hunter, George Mathews, Robert Dryden, Mandy Patinkin, Gilbert Mack
5	5	"No Hiding Place"	Himan Brown	Sidney Slon	January 10, 1974
Thanks to a blackmailer, a well-regarded businessman faces the possibility of a dark secret from his past coming to light. Starring: Larry Haines, Jackson Beck, Anne Meacham, Sydney Walker, Tom Keena
6	6	"Honeymoon with Death"	Himan Brown	George Lowther	January 11, 1974
A policeman must determine who's telling the truth: A newlywed woman who says her husband was murdered... or her sister, who claims that the story (and the marriage) is a fabrication. Starring: Lois Nettleton, Teri Keane, Tony Roberts, Norman Rose
7	7	"I Warn You Three Times"	Himan Brown	Sam Dann	January 12, 1974
Hedy Peterson's husband vanishes while clearing the windshield of the car they're riding in during a snowstorm. After the husband reappears, he tells a newspaper reporter a fantastic tale of his marriage... and of who Hedy really is. Starring: Joan Lorring, Mason Adams, Tom Keena, Alan Manson, Sam Gray
8	8	"Cold Storage"	Himan Brown	Ian Martin	January 13, 1974
A man executes a dark plan to reclaim a wealthy inheritance left to him by his late mother... after discovering she is very much alive. Starring: Ruby Dee, John Baragrey, Bryna Raeburn, Todd Davis, Roxie Roxer
9	9	"Death Rides a Stallion"	Himan Brown	Sam Dann	January 14, 1974
A dead girl returns on a fiery steed to torment the boyfriend suspected of causing her death in a horse riding accident. Starring: Mason Adams, Marian Seldes, Paul McGrath, Barbara Worthington, Harry Bellaver
10	10	"The Resident"	Himan Brown	Elspeth Eric	January 15, 1974
Malvina Thripp's retirement to the countryside is disrupted by a cat and a young girl who forcefully move in with her. Starring: Carmen Matthews, Joan Lorring, Gilbert Mack
11	11	"Accounts Receivable"	Himan Brown	Sidney Slon	January 16, 1974
A case of stolen money brings together an embittered son and the father whose criminal reputation has been a burden on the younger man. Starring: William Prince, Joseph Julian, Ian Martin, Ralph Carter, Joan Lovejoy, Robert Dryden, Himan Brown
12	12	"You Can Die Again"	Himan Brown	Sam Dann	January 17, 1974
Spencer Chadwick offers a police detective a time-bending claim that he murdered his wife and is having an affair with another woman. Starring: Richard Mulligan, Mandel Kramer, Marian Seldes, Bryna Raeburn, Gilbert Mack, Himan Brown
13	13	"A Ring of Roses"	Himan Brown	S. J. Wilson	January 18, 1974
Laurie Thornton and her fiancé discover a mystery surrounding Laurie's college roommate, one that involves an antique ring, a nursery rhyme... and an ancient curse. Starring: Glynnis O'Connor, George Petrie, Sydney Walker, Elspeth Eric, Holland Taylor, Carol Hilliard
14	14	"The Girl Who Found Things"	Himan Brown	Henry Slesar	January 19, 1974
A couple take in a delinquent young girl with a penchant for discovering missing items — including dead bodies. Starring: Norman Rose, Bryna Raeburn, Robert Dryden, Martha Greenhouse, Barbara Caruso, Anne Costello
15	15	"The Chinaman Button"	Himan Brown	Henry Slesar	January 20, 1974
"Everybody's the same when it comes to money; it's the great leveler." An advertising executive devises a ruse to embarrass a scrupulously honest rival, telling him he'll receive a $1 million "inheritance" from a distant, wealthy — and nonexistent — cousin if he authorizes the relative's murder. Starring: Paul Hecht, Mason Adams, Ralph Bell, Evie Juster, Will Hare
16	16	"Dead for a Dollar"	Himan Brown	Murray Burnett	January 21, 1974
Two men burned by ruthless businessman Jason Grant plot Grant's murder, only to pay the price after someone else commits the deadly deed. Starring: Paul Hecht, Joseph Julian, Joan Lovejoy, George Petrie, Tony Roberts, Mary Jane Higby
17	17	"A Very Old Man"	Himan Brown	Elspeth Eric	January 22, 1974
An elderly man possesses an acumen for diagnosing and healing ailments using just the warmth of his hands. Starring: Santos Ortega, Norman Rose, Bryna Raeburn, William Redfield
18	18	"And Nothing But the Truth"	Himan Brown	Ian Martin	January 23, 1974
David Williams is responsible for a hit-and-run accident with a pedestrian; his father, aiming to protect David's college scholarship, takes the blame... but a young investigator thinks otherwise. Starring: Arnold Moss, Ralph Bell, Clarice Blackburn, William Redfield, Kristoffer Tabori
19	19	"Deadly Honeymoon"	Himan Brown	Henry Slesar	January 24, 1974
A cross-country trip turns into a nightmare when a police detective advises a newly wedded woman that her husband was culpable in how his first two honeymoons ended — with the brides meeting their untimely demise. Starring: Betsy von Furstenberg, Michael Wager, Mason Adams, Elspeth Eric
20	20	"Speak of the Devil"	Himan Brown	Ian Martin	January 25, 1974
A bride-to-be and her fiancé join in on a spiritual séance conducted by her aunt, which leads to the unleashing of demons that plague the couple and the baby they conceived. Starring: Jada Rowland, Bryna Raeburn, Nick Pryor, Ian Martin
21	21	"The Ring of Truth"	Himan Brown	Henry Slesar	January 26, 1974
Lorna Kitteredge is torn between lying about a fatal auto accident (for the sake of her fiancé Mark) or telling the truth (which would please her father but jeopardize her engagement with Mark). Starring: Agnes Moorehead, Ian Martin, Mandel Kramer, Santos Ortega, Dan Ocko
22	22	"Time and Again"	Himan Brown	Ian Martin	January 27, 1974
A clockmaker discovers an antique clock that can make time stand still... so long as it remains lubricated with human blood. Starring: John Beal, Grace Matthews, Bryna Raeburn, Ian Martin
23	23	"Three Women"	Himan Brown	Elspeth Eric	January 28, 1974
Despite his publisher's insistence, writer Steven Lake is hesitant to alter the ending of his book, wherein its leading heroine — who's become just as real a person to Lake as his wife and mother-in-law — is killed off. Starring: Ruth Ford, George Petrie, Roger De Koven, Joan Lorring
24	24	"The Man Who Heard Voices"	Himan Brown	Sam Dann	January 29, 1974
A lawyer's life is disrupted by his hearing voices, including that of his late first wife (whom he had killed in mercy). Starring: Larry Haines, Augusta Dabney, Leon Janney, Suzanne Grossman
25	25	"Mother Love"	Himan Brown	Bob Juhren	January 30, 1974
Six thousand bucks and an unusual favor are all the titular fortune teller needs to grant a spell that can give the young, infertile Paula Richards the chance to conceive a child. Starring: Joan Hackett, Evie Juster, Leon Janney, Mason Adams, Roger De Koven, Vinnette Carroll
26	26	"The Man Who Asked for Yesterday"	Himan Brown	Ian Martin	January 31, 1974
Hospitalized with a bullet lodged in his brain, a man is given the chance to relive the previous day that led to his unfortunate circumstance. Starring: Mandel Kramer, Evie Juster, Paul Hecht, Gilbert Mack, Ralph Bell

=== February ===
No. overall	No. in season	Title	Directed by	Written by	Original release date
27	27	"Dead Ringer"	Himan Brown	Murray Burnett	February 1, 1974
A woman discovers a man who looks exactly like her estranged husband, and the two contrive a way to kill the husband and secure his wealth. Starring: Leon Janney, Joan Lovejoy, Larry Haines, Robert Dryden, Paul Hecht
28	28	"A Ghostly Game of Death"	Himan Brown	Murray Burnett	February 2, 1974
A developer hires a ghost hunter to drive three spirits from a condemned seaside house, those of two lovers and the sea captain who murdered them. Starring: William Prince, Joan Tyson, William Redfield, Gilbert Mack, Ralph Bell
29	29	"The Sign of the Beast"	Himan Brown	Sam Dann	February 3, 1974
An impetuous archaeologist disregards tribal customs while on an excavation in South America; her selfish acts result in a native bringing an ancient curse upon her. Starring: Lois Smith, Paul McGrath, Tom Keene, Dan Ocko
30	30	"Here Goes the Bride"	Himan Brown	Ian Martin	February 4, 1974
A newlywed woman arrives at her new husband's seaside estate and encounters savage dogs, a resentful housekeeper... and the spirit of her husband's former wife, a film star who may have died under suspicious circumstances. Starring: Ruby Dee, Michael Wager, Teri Keane, Bryna Raeburn, Ian Martin
31	31	"The Lady Was a Tiger"	Himan Brown	Murray Burnett	February 5, 1974
An out-of-work journalist accepts an assignment in Paris and is soon accused of homicide; the woman who obtains his release from jail may also be the double agent who set him up for the crime. Starring: William Redfield, Joan Lorring, Roger De Koven, Ian Martin, Chris Gampel
32	32	"After the Verdict"	Himan Brown	Henry Slesar	February 6, 1974
A defense attorney ponders what should be done after the client he successfully defended in a murder case admits to the crime post-acquittal. Starring: Tony Roberts, Joseph Julian, Bryna Raeburn, Barbara Caruso, Robert Dryden, Sam Gray
33	33	"Conspiracy to Defraud"	Himan Brown	Sidney Slon	February 8, 1974
A U.S. detective, sent to France to investigate a heroin trafficking case, encounters very unwelcoming people... except for a woman he meets on the flight to Paris and quickly falls head over heels for. Starring: Paul Hecht, Suzanne Grossman, Ruth Warrick, Leon Janney, George Petrie, Gilbert Mack
34	34	"The Deadly Hour"	Himan Brown	Elspeth Eric	February 9, 1974
A traumatized man relays to a psychiatrist a tale of infidelity and vengeance that left him literally scared silent for 25 years. Starring: Norman Rose, Marian Seldes, John Baragrey, Jack Grimes
35	35	"Dead Man's Mountain"	Himan Brown	Sam Dann	February 10, 1974
Firmly determined to turn a mountain in the Adirondacks into a resort, a New York developer sets out to prove that the peak is not as cursed — and life-altering — as the locals insist it is. Starring: Alan Hewitt, Bryna Raeburn, William Redfield, Robert Dryden
36	36	"A Dream of Death"	Himan Brown	Sam Dann	February 12, 1974
A college history professor and his student seem destined to fulfill the 200-year-old tale of a Civil War soldier and the rancorous woman he jilted. Starring: Michael Tolan, Marian Seldes, Evie Juster, Ira Lewis, Robert Dryden
37	37	"Dig Me Deadly"	Himan Brown	S. J. Wilson	February 13, 1974
A detective is summoned to an Arizona archaeological site to examine the mystery of an ancient skeleton attached with the hands of a girl who had recently gone missing. Starring: Louise Larrabee, Mason Adams, Ralph Bell, Corrine Orr, Anne Costello, Kristoffer Tabori
38	38	"Under Grave Suspicion"	Himan Brown	Henry Warner	February 14, 1974
Two storms hit a seaside cottage: A developing hurricane, and a bitter fight between an estranged husband and wife. Starring: Ralph Bell, Patricia Wheel, Robert Dryden, William Redfield
39	39	"A Lady Never Loses Her Head"	Himan Brown	Ian Martin	February 16, 1974
An American woman marries an aristocratic Brit, but upon arriving at his manor house becomes haunted by a headless apparition... one that bears a strikingly familiar resemblance. Starring: Kim Hunter, Nick Pryor, Bryna Raeburn, Court Benson, Ian Martin
40	40	"The Walking Corpse"	Himan Brown	Ian Martin	February 17, 1974
Two newlyweds win a two-week vacation in a Caribbean island country... where a military general uses an army of zombies to take over the government. Starring: Tony Roberts, Jackson Beck, Suzanne Grossman, Vinnette Carroll, Bob Kaliban, Ian Martin
41	41	"Blizzard of Terror"	Himan Brown	George Lowther	February 18, 1974
A couple seeks refuge from a blizzard in a remote cabin, where the man who inhabits it may be an axe murderer wanted by the police. Starring: Lois Smith, Larry Haines, Leon Janney
42	42	"Sea Fever"	Himan Brown	Ian Martin	February 19, 1974
A jealous sea captain has his wife on board, and threatens his crew with death if they glance at or even talk about her. Starring: George Mathews, Bret Morrison, Leon Janney, Marian Seldes, William Redfield
43	43	"The Walls of Jericho"	Himan Brown	Elspeth Eric	February 21, 1974
The steward of a men's club pulls jokes on the club's snobbish members, only to discover he's also bringing up ghostly apparitions who tend to get out of hand. Starring: Robert Dryden, Mary Jane Higby, Ian Martin, Ralph Bell, Guy Sorel, Sydney Walker
44	44	"The Horla"	Himan Brown	Sam Dann	February 22, 1974
A man greets a ship in the harbor, only to realize he's invited an evil spirit that immediately plagues his sanity — and his life. Starring: Paul Hecht, Bryna Raeburn, Dan Ocko, Robert Dryden; Adapted from the short story by Guy de Maupassant
45	45	"The Horse That Wasn't For Sale"	Himan Brown	Henry Slesar	February 24, 1974
To help pay off her late father's monetary debts, Crissie Runyon agrees to sell her family's stable of horses... except for Stargazer, who only obeys Crissie's directions. Starring: Mercedes McCambridge, Arnold Moss, William Redfield, Earl Hammond
46	46	"The Edge of Death"	Himan Brown	Sol Panitz	February 26, 1974
The sight of a mysterious faceless figure terrorizes a rural community, in particular a farmer distressed over his wife's illness. Starring: Patrick O'Neal, Marian Seldes, Ian Martin, Leon Janney
47	47	"A Choice of Witnesses"	Himan Brown	Henry Slesar	February 28, 1974
Even though he's tired of paying off the photographer who blackmailed him, Gordon Bailey is reluctant to join his fellow victims in a plot to kill the crook. Starring: Paul Hecht, Evie Juster, Ralph Bell, Robert Dryden

=== March ===
No. overall	No. in season	Title	Directed by	Written by	Original release date
48	48	"Out of Sight"	Himan Brown	Ian Martin	March 2, 1974
A superstitious astronaut believes the space flight she's on is cursed due to her very presence. Starring: Julia Meade, Sydney Walker, Jack Grimes, Ira Lewis
49	49	"Prognosis Negative"	Himan Brown	Sidney Slon	March 3, 1974
A possibly brainwashed former POW escapes from a veterans' hospital and goes on a killing spree; a spiritual medium is able to corral him... and use him for her own nefarious motives. Starring: William Redfield, Bryna Raeburn, Mason Adams, Martha Greenhouse, Earl Hammond
50	50	"This Will Kill You"	Himan Brown	Murray Burnett	March 4, 1974
A literary reviewer pens a negative assessment about a book on demonology; deeply insulted, the book's author responds by placing a death curse on him. Starring: Norman Rose, Larry Haines, Evie Juster, Roger De Koven, Gilbert Mack
51	51	"A Long Time to Die"	Himan Brown	Sam Dann	March 5, 1974
A criminologist and an American Indian swap lives, only to realize their exchanged circumstances threaten to engulf them (one must provide a deposition before a tribal council, the other the same before Congress). Starring: Mandel Kramer, Grace Matthews, Arnold Moss, Nat Polen, Mason Adams
52	52	"The Sending"	Himan Brown	Robert Newman	March 6, 1974
A professor targets two college students through a form of black magic, with an end result that helps prolong the life of his ailing wife. Starring: Mandel Kramer, Marian Seldes, Tony Roberts, Phoebe Dorin
53	53	"The Creature from the Swamp"	Himan Brown	Ian Martin	March 7, 1974
After a woman is rescued from swampy quicksand, she tells her liberator that she's being pursued by a swamp creature. Starring: Jack Grimes, Joan Lorring, Leon Janney, Robert Dryden, Ian Martin
54	54	"The Thing in the Cave"	Himan Brown	Ian Martin	March 11, 1974
Two couples are trapped in a cave, one already occupied by a mysterious resident. Starring: Teri Keane, Marian Seldes, Michael Wager, Bob Kaliban
55	55	"A Sacrifice in Blood"	Himan Brown	Milt Wisoff	March 12, 1974
Two archaeologists discover and adopt a baby boy found in an ancient Aztec temple — much to their own regret. Starring: Patricia Roe, Ralph Bell, Ian Martin, Don Scardino
56	56	"A Little Night Murder"	Himan Brown	Sam Dann	March 13, 1974
A serial killer stalks women in his town, all to fulfill a childhood promise to kill them. Starring: Tony Roberts, Suzanne Grossman, Jack Grimes, Bryna Raeburn, Robert Dryden
57	57	"The Fall of the House of Usher"	Himan Brown	George Lowther	March 14, 1974
An adaptation of Edgar Allan Poe's classic tale about an insane heir, his cataleptic sister, and macabre incidents that tear apart both a house and a family. Starring: Kevin McCarthy, Arnold Moss, Marian Seldes, Robert Dryden
58	58	"Sea of Troubles"	Himan Brown	Henry Slesar	March 18, 1974
With his brother's help, a man conspires to murder his wife and secure her wealth while on a trans-Atlantic cruise. Starring: Staats Cotsworth, Bryna Raeburn, Dan Ocko, Earl Hammond, Ian Martin
59	59	"Frankenstein Revisited"	Himan Brown	Milt Wisoff	March 19, 1974
A news team plans to cover the 400th anniversary of the death of Baron Von Frankenstein — a commemoration the doctor and his creature are eager to crash. Starring: Michael Wager, Leon Janney, Ralph Bell, Evie Juster, William Redfield
60	60	"The Ghost at the Gate"	Himan Brown	Elspeth Eric	March 20, 1974
A ghostly tale of a two-timing man who continues to romance both his wife and his mistress even after his death. Starring: Beatrice Straight, Paula Trueman, Joan Lorring, John Baragrey
61	61	"Ordeal by Fire"	Himan Brown	Murray Burnett	March 21, 1974
A father and daughter are crippled with 3rd degree burns for refusing a $1 million demand by a man who can control elemental fire. It prompts the father to turn his home into a fortress, and his daughter to ask her beau for assistance. Starring: Mandel Kramer, Julie Newmar, Earl Hammond, Guy Sorel, Sydney Walker
62	62	"Diary of a Madman"	Himan Brown	Sam Dann	March 25, 1974
A magistrate confesses to his secret life as a multiple-times murderer in this retelling of the Guy de Maupassant short story. Starring: Larry Haines, Evie Juster, Robert Dryden, William Redfield
63	63	"Death by Whose Hands"	Himan Brown	Ian Martin	March 26, 1974
In the early 20th century, a prosthetic surgeon transplants the hands of a prodigious musician onto the man who was his rival — with deadly repercussions. Starring: Stefan Schnabel, Ira Lewis, Robert Drivas, Marian Seldes, Roger De Koven
64	64	"It's Simply Murder"	Himan Brown	Ian Martin	March 27, 1974
A hen-pecked husband who's long dreamt of escaping his domineering wife gets caught up in a weekend-long plot to not only kill her, but also rob a bank and escape with another woman. Starring: Jack Gilford, Marian Hailey, Bryna Raeburn, Dan Ocko, Ian Martin
65	65	"The Unearthly Gift"	Himan Brown	Ian Martin	March 28, 1974
A clairvoyant cook at a lumberjack camp takes action when she foresees a horrible premonition of death involving a camp newcomer. Starring: Betsy Palmer, Mason Adams, Jackson Beck, Carmen Matthews, Ian Martin

=== April ===
No. overall	No. in season	Title	Directed by	Written by	Original release date
66	66	"The Black Cat"	Himan Brown	Sam Dann	April 1, 1974
A man marries for the money, but finds his rich new wife and her cat repulsive... and is convinced by the cat that he will eventually murder his wife. Starring: Norman Rose, Marian Seldes, Evie Juster, Robert Dryden, Joe DeSantis; Based on the short story by Edgar Allan Poe
67	67	"The Pharaoh's Curse"	Himan Brown	Ian Martin	April 2, 1974
An ancient curse plagues an archaeologist and a singer as they hunt for a treasure of jewels within an Egyptian tomb. Starring: Kim Hunter, George Petrie, Dan Ocko, Arnold Moss, Ian Martin
68	68	"Die! You're on Magic Camera"	Himan Brown	Murray Burnett	April 3, 1974
An aspiring photographer takes possession of a camera that takes pictures of future events. He's soon pursued by the people who made the camera, as well as its past subjects. Starring: Nick Pryor, Teri Keane, Joan Lovejoy, Joseph Julian, William Redfield
69	69	"The Thing Inside"	Himan Brown	Robert Newman	April 4, 1974
An artist and his wife buy a glass paperweight at a curio store. The artist soon develops a fixation on it, and his wife believes he's being controlled by an evil spirit after suspecting his involvement in a greedy developer's death. Starring: Ralph Bell, Bryna Raeburn, Bob Kaliban, Leon Janney
70	70	"The Locked Room"	Himan Brown	Henry Slesar	April 8, 1974
The bride's mother plays villain when she suspects her son-in-law married her not-very-beautiful daughter solely for her wealth. Starring: Jack Grimes, Corinne Orr, Carmen Matthews, Sydney Smith
71	71	"The Murder Museum"	Himan Brown	Henry Slesar	April 9, 1974
A wax museum dedicated to infamous criminals is preparing to unveil a violent murder's reenactment. When Lisa Brandon is unable to get an advanced showing, she relays to a tour guide the story of a tormented acquaintance who had protested the exhibit's development. Starring: Michael Wager, Marian Seldes, Robert Dryden, Leon Janney
72	72	"Out of Focus"	Himan Brown	Ian Martin	April 10, 1974
A married ad executive with a troubled family life falls madly in love with a mysterious woman he wants to photograph for a lucrative campaign. Problem is, only he can see her... and there's a reason her image is hard to capture. Starring: William Redfield, Joan Lorring, Suzanne Grossman, Dan Ocko, Ralph Bell, Earl Hammond
73	73	"Strange Company"	Himan Brown	Bob Juhren	April 11, 1974
A wealthy elderly woman is terrorized by visitors only she can see; her nephew and his equally unsympathetic wife use his aunt's apparent hallucinations to rob her of her wealth. Starring: Bryna Raeburn, George Petrie, Gilbert Mack, Lori March
74	74	"Only the Dead Remember"	Himan Brown	Sam Dann	April 15, 1974
"Mother Hennessey's chickens are coming home to roost." A Korean War veteran talks two fellow ex-prisoners of war into killing another ex-POW who foiled their escape attempt (and may have caused the disappearance of a compatriot) from a North Korean camp. Starring: Tony Roberts, Mandel Kramer, George Petrie, Bryna Raeburn, Lon Clark
75	75	"Men Without Mouths"	Himan Brown	Henry Slesar	April 16, 1974
An aging mobster is haunted by visions of figures without mouths; the daughter of a mob compatriot (whom he adopted after her father's death) and her fiancé try to aid him through his terror. Starring: Joe Silver, Patricia Elliott, Dan Ocko, Ira Lewis
76	76	"The Horror Within"	Himan Brown	Milt Wisoff	April 17, 1974
After his girlfriend's death, a young man turns to religion, successfully seeking the power to prevent future pain and suffering in the world. But over time, his grief heals, his faith sways... and his desire to wield his powers grows. Starring: Don Scardino, Dolores Sutton, Joseph Julian, Robert Dryden, Earl Hammond
77	77	"A Portrait of Death"	Himan Brown	Sam Dann	April 18, 1974
A police detective looks into the background of his soon-to-be brother-in-law, an arts school failure turned celebrated painter whose portrait subjects die not long after their paintings are finished. Starring: Nat Polen, Marian Seldes, Jack Grimes, Jackson Beck, Roger De Koven
78	78	"The Wishing Stone"	Himan Brown	Ian Martin	April 22, 1974
A young country girl believes an angel gave her a wishing stone, but the hopeful things she wishes for produce nothing but adversity for her downtrodden family and the community around her. Starring: Clarice Blackburn, William Prince, Anne Costello, Jack Grimes, Robert Dryden
79	79	"The Ghost Driver"	Himan Brown	George Lowther	April 23, 1974
The ghost of a driver who killed the past proprietors of a country inn threatens the inn's current owners and their guests. Starring: Augusta Dabney, Mason Adams, Mary Jane Higby, Norman Rose, Nick Pryor, Leon Janney
80	80	"The Hand"	Himan Brown	Ian Martin	April 24, 1974
A man receives a human hand in the mail and believes it to be a harbinger of doom. Starring: Alexander Scourby, Ian Martin, Mildred Clinton, Guy Sorel; Adapted from a short story by Guy de Maupassant
81	81	"Sunrise to Sunset"	Himan Brown	Elspeth Eric	April 25, 1974
The bereaving children of a strong-willed woman fear she may have returned from the dead as a vampire. Starring: Marian Seldes, Bryna Raeburn, William Johnstone, William Redfield
82	82	"All Living Things Must Die"	Himan Brown	Elspeth Eric	April 29, 1974
Barbara is joylessly stuck at home with a domineering husband, a longing to have a baby, and only her houseplants to nurture and talk to. But when Barbara dares to give voice to how she really feels about her husband, her plants take lethal action. Starring: Mercedes McCambridge, Larry Haines, Ralph Bell
83	83	"The Venus d'Ile"	Himan Brown	Sam Dann	April 30, 1974
"I am the Goddess of Love... but I am also the Goddess of Death."; In part to resolve his casino debts, deep-in-the-hole gambler Claude plans to propose marriage to his rich, aristocratic girlfriend. But in a careless moment, he places his ring in the hand of a statue of Venus. It awakens the goddess, who demands Claude give her his heart... or his life. Starring: Norman Rose, Joan Lovejoy, Evie Juster, Dan Ocko, Robert Dryden; Adapted from a short story by Prosper Mérimée

=== May ===
No. overall	No. in season	Title	Directed by	Written by	Original release date
84	84	"The Death Bell"	Himan Brown	Ian Martin	May 1, 1974
An American man encounters worried hosts, IRA sympathizers, and a mysterious woman's voice while journeying to his ancestral home in Ireland. Starring: Michael Tolan, Marian Seldes, William Redfield, Guy Sorel
85	85	"Dracula"	Himan Brown	George Lowther	May 2, 1974
Bram Stoker's classic tale is retold in a story of a young woman being drained of her blood — and her life — by the titular vampire; she and her loved ones must undertake an effort to stop him. Starring: Mercedes McCambridge, Paul Hecht, Stefan Schnabel, Michael Wager, Marian Seldes
86	86	"Murder with Malice"	Himan Brown	Ian Martin	May 6, 1974
A brother attempts to hypnotize his sister into killing their father. Starring: Marcia Rodd, Ira Lewis, Nick Pryor, Staats Cotsworth
87	87	"The Suicide Club"	Himan Brown	George Lowther	May 7, 1974
A high stakes gambler joins a club with a lethal demand: commit murder, or be forced to take their own lives. Starring: Barry Nelson, Marian Seldes, John Baragrey, Dan Ocko, Lloyd Battista; Adapted from a short story by Robert Louis Stevenson
88	88	"The Breaking Point"	Himan Brown	Henry Warner	May 8, 1974
A scientist's work in thought projection turns dangerous when he targets his wife's subconscious with a macabre idea — that she should murder him. Starring: Roger De Koven, Bryna Raeburn, Nat Polen
89	89	"A Tiny Drop of Poison"	Himan Brown	Sam Dann	May 9, 1974
A charismatic politician holds a dark secret: she committed an unsolved murder during her days as a hippie radical. It's a cold case her detective husband has been assigned to crack. Starring: Tammy Grimes, Paul Hecht, Robert Dryden, Earl Hammond
90	90	"The Lodger"	Himan Brown	George Lowther	May 13, 1974
A series of killings of women in the neighborhood worry a boarding house matron, who thinks her new lodger may be responsible. Starring: Kim Hunter, Michael Wager, Robert Dryden, Mary Jane Higby, Joseph Julian
91	91	"Voices of Death"	Himan Brown	Murray Burnett	May 14, 1974
Actor Jason Phillips must use his wiles to avoid killing the widow of noted producer Peter Truro, whose apparition appears through Jason's TV set urging him to commit the deadly deed. Starring: Mandel Kramer, Ralph Bell, Evie Juster, Bob Kaliban
92	92	"The Forever Man"	Himan Brown	Sam Dann	May 15, 1974
A healthy yet delinquent young man is given monetary and material security by an elderly millionaire, in exchange for one thing: The older man wants the younger's body, through "psychic surgery," to regain his youth. Starring: Paul Hecht, Bryna Raeburn, Dan Ocko, William Redfield, Leon Janney
93	93	"The Trouble with Ruth"	Himan Brown	Henry Slesar	May 16, 1974
Two thieves coerce a trying-to-go-straight kleptomaniac into stealing a diamond pin for them, threatening to tell her husband if she doesn't assist. Starring: Marian Seldes, George Petrie, Jack Grimes, Jackson Beck, Gilbert Mack
94	94	"The Crack in the Wall"	Himan Brown	Sidney Slon	May 20, 1974
Grieving over the loss of their daughter in a house fire, a couple try but fail to repair a crack in the basement wall of their new home; then they start to hear their daughter's cries through that crack. Starring: Celeste Holm, Anne Costello, Robert Dryden, Robert Maxwell, Wesley Addy
95	95	"The Longest Knife"	Himan Brown	Sam Dann	May 21, 1974
A woman vows to take revenge upon the third world dictator who killed her son. Starring: Bryna Raeburn, Marian Seldes, Jack Grimes, Leon Janney, Gilbert Mack
96	96	"The Bleeding Statue"	Himan Brown	Ian Martin	May 23, 1974
Disappointing his heirs, a magician leaves his entire estate to his daughter, along with a promise to protect her from harm through a statue in the estate's courtyard. Starring: Patricia Elliott, Tony Roberts, Grace Matthews, Court Benson, Paul Hecht
97	97	"Mirror for Murder"	Himan Brown	Sam Dann	May 27, 1974
Tired of living in the shadow of her husband and his job, a woman sees her reflection in the mirror and starts to reclaim her sense of self. Starring: Celeste Holm, Robert Dryden, William Redfield, Wesley Addy
98	98	"The Phantom Lullaby"	Himan Brown	Elspeth Eric	May 29, 1974
Two parents rent an expensive apartment for their daughter, who's recuperating from a bitter relationship and an abortion. But the apartment holds a resident spirit that soon haunts her. Starring: Rosemary Murphy, Arnold Moss, Mason Adams, Corinne Orr, Robert Dryden
99	99	"Dressed to Kill"	Himan Brown	Bob Juhren	May 30, 1974
An unemployed actor fakes his own "accidental" death, then passes himself off as his "wife" in order to claim the double indemnity policy he took out on himself years earlier. Starring: Robert Morse, Bryna Raeburn, Dan Ocko, Earl Hammond, Michael Tolan

=== June ===
No. overall	No. in season	Title	Directed by	Written by	Original release date
100	100	"To Kill with Confidence"	Himan Brown	Sam Dann	June 3, 1974
A newlywed couple stop off in a small town for car repairs. When the wife steps away to get a quick bite to eat, she returns to find the garage, the car, her husband, and the mechanic have all vanished. Starring: Marian Seldes, George Petrie, Larry Haines, Gilbert Mack
101	101	"An Occurrence at Owl Creek Bridge"	Himan Brown	Sam Dann	June 4, 1974
A Confederate spy escapes the hangman's noose and journeys through enemy territory in this retelling of Ambrose Bierce's classic short story. Starring: William Prince, Mildred Clinton, Jack Grimes, Leon Janney, William Redfield
102	102	"Darling Deadly Dolores"	Himan Brown	Sam Dann	June 6, 1974
A scientist discovers a computer's conspiracy to exterminate all animal life on Earth. Starring: Nat Polen, Marian Seldes, Earl Hammond, Roger De Koven
103	103	"A Bargain in Blood"	Himan Brown	Henry Slesar	June 10, 1974
A young man discovers the ability to trade from others their physical traits and afflictions, using his gift to impress his sweetheart and her hard-to-please father. Starring: Tony Roberts, Mandel Kramer, Evie Juster, Gilbert Mack, Robert Dryden, Jack Grimes; Adapted by Slesar from his 1961 short story "The Self-Improvement of Salvadore Ross" (which was also adapted into a 1964 episode of TV's The Twilight Zone)
104	104	"The Rat"	Himan Brown	George Lowther	June 12, 1974
A genius scientist develops a highly-evolved, super-intelligent rodent, which he sends to attack his unfaithful wife's lover. Starring: Michael Wager, Joan Lorring, Ralph Bell, Bob Kaliban
105	105	"The House of the Seven Gables"	Himan Brown	Ian Martin	June 13, 1974
An adaptation of Nathaniel Hawthorne's novel about the curses and tragedies that befall a mansion's owner and his descendants. Starring: Norman Rose, Arnold Moss, Bryna Raeburn, Jada Rowland, Staats Cotsworth
106	106	"Three Times Dead"	Himan Brown	Sam Dann	June 17, 1974
After a cop is forced to kill two culprits in an attempted store robbery, the grateful shopkeeper offers to the cop's wife a reward of a figurine that will grant the bearer three wishes. Starring: William Redfield, Sam Gray, Suzanne Grossman, Dan Ocko; Based on a short story by W. W. Jacobs
107	107	"Dr. Jekyll and Mr. Hyde"	Himan Brown	George Lowther	June 18, 1974
An adaptation of the Robert Louis Stevenson tale about a sociable doctor and the sinister alter ego he develops after an experiment gone awry. Starring: Kevin McCarthy, Marian Seldes, Ian Martin, Court Benson
108	108	"The Secret Doctrine"	Himan Brown	Elspeth Eric	June 20, 1974
The obsessed French fan of a famous American actor becomes revengeful when he humiliatingly rejects her marriage-minded advances. Starring: Mercedes McCambridge, Mildred Clinton, William Johnstone, Robert Dryden, Nick Pryor
109	109	"Escape! Escape!"	Himan Brown	Bob Juhren	June 24, 1974
With the help of the former's wife, Army stockade escapees Hank Farley and Will Chase take refuge in a house in the woods, one already occupied by an elderly woman with mystic powers. Starring: Teri Keane, Robert Dryden, Bob Kaliban, Bryna Raeburn
110	110	"Where Fear Begins"	Himan Brown	Henry Slesar	June 25, 1974
Prompted by her sister's panicked final words, a woman learns of a drug developed by a mysterious doctor, a prescription that can literally scare a person to death. Starring: Kim Hunter, Mason Adams, Alan Hewitt, Ian Martin, Phoebe Dorin
111	111	"Yesterday's Murder"	Himan Brown	Sam Dann	June 27, 1974
A down-on-her-luck woman is granted the opportunity to go back in time 21 years and right a past wrong to set her life in order. Starring: Mercedes McCambridge, Leon Janney, Patricia Wheel, Robert Maxwell

=== July ===
No. overall	No. in season	Title	Directed by	Written by	Original release date
112	112	"Hurricane"	Himan Brown	George Lowther	July 1, 1974
A couple take refuge from a storm in a secluded beach house, which is already occupied by two men — one of whom is toting a revolver. Starring: Joseph Julian, Evie Juster, Jack Grimes, Gordon Gould
113	113	"The Secret Life of Bobby Deland"	Himan Brown	Elspeth Eric	July 3, 1974
Grieving from the tragic death of their only child, a couple take in a young orphan, who not only cures the woman's migraines... but also robs both of them blind. Starring: Michael Tolan, Gilbert Mack, Hetty Galen, Marian Seldes, Martha Greenhouse
114	114	"The Young Die Good"	Himan Brown	Murray Burnett	July 4, 1974
A married couple move next to a strange house, but their differing visual interpretations of its occupant (the wife sees her as frail, the husband sees her as young and attractive) creates a strain in their marriage. Starring: Patricia Elliott, Carol Teitel, Ira Lewis, Dan Ocko
115	115	"Too Many Women Can Kill You"	Himan Brown	Sam Dann	July 8, 1974
Silas Cunningham is haunted by several women: The blackmailing maid and her sister, who know Silas is responsible for his wife's death... and the spirit of that wife, who haunts him in his dreams. Starring: Larry Haines, Evie Juster, Bryna Raeburn, Guy Sorel
116	116	"And Death Makes Even Steven"	Himan Brown	Ian Martin	July 9, 1974
A profligate young man plots the murder of his twin brother, whom he believes slighted him out of an inheritance from their father. Starring: Michael Tolan, Paul Hecht, Joan Lovejoy, Ian Martin
117	117	"The Devil-God"	Himan Brown	Mary Jane Higby	July 11, 1974
Jeff & Katie Moore inherit her late father's sprawling ranch in the American Southwest, on which roams a mysterious Palomino stallion; the Moores' attempt to claim the horse as their own give the indigenous ranch hands grave concern. Starring: Ruby Dee, Mandel Kramer, Leon Janney, Guy Sorel
118	118	"The Canterville Ghost"	Himan Brown	George Lowther	July 15, 1974
A spirit repeatedly attempts to scare away the new owners of his castle, instead becoming a source of hilarity and amusement. Starring: Arnold Moss, Marian Seldes, Mildred Clinton, William Redfield, Robert Dryden; Adapted from the short story by Oscar Wilde
119	119	"The Real Printer's Devil"	Himan Brown	Ian Martin	July 17, 1974
A young couple luck out in finding an inexpensive apartment in New York's Central Park West, but soon learn it already has an invisible guest for an occupant. Starring: Paul Hecht, Jada Rowland, Bryna Raeburn, Ian Martin
120	120	"The Dream Woman"	Himan Brown	George Lowther	July 18, 1974
A man abandons his loyal wife to pursue a struggling actress he met at a bar; he believes the barfly is his "dream woman" — but soon has dreams that he will die at his new paramour's hands. Starring: Kevin McCarthy, Teri Keane, Grace Matthews, Robert Dryden; Adapted from a short story by Wilkie Collins
121	121	"The Deadly Process"	Himan Brown	Sam Dann	July 22, 1974
In order to save his job, an unskilled engineer pilfers from an old friend the secret to a revolutionary industrial process; it earns him a promotion, but he must lie, cheat, and bribe in order to keep how he got the idea a secret. Starring: Norman Rose, Ralph Bell, Marian Seldes, Robert Maxwell, Jackson Beck
122	122	"Adam's Astral Self"	Himan Brown	Elspeth Eric	July 23, 1974
Adam Farr is able to project his spiritual self to other places; it annoys his wife enough that she leaves him, but Adam has a plan to woo her back. Starring: Michael Wager, Jennifer Harmon, Jacqueline Brookes, William Redfield
123	123	"My Sister — Death"	Himan Brown	George Lowther	July 25, 1974
A twisted tale of Sybil Carter's attempts to drive her sister Andrea insane in order to gain their late brother's estate... or is Andrea already in need of a psychiatrist? Starring: Beatrice Straight, Marian Seldes, Paul Hecht, George Petrie
124	124	"Ghost at High Noon"	Himan Brown	Elizabeth Pennell	July 29, 1974
Stuck in the middle of the desert with a broken down car, two women are rescued by an old man in a covered wagon, who takes them to the nearest town where he and the townsfolk insist that the women stay. Starring: Celeste Holm, Frances Sternhagen, Nat Polen, Gilbert Mack
125	125	"The Only Blood"	Himan Brown	Sam Dann	July 31, 1974
An immigrant shoemaker vows murderous revenge after he and his family are attacked by the local mafia for his refusal to pay "protection" money. Meanwhile, the mafia's head feels torn between his chosen business and the love of his daughter. Starring: Howard DaSilva, Ken Harvey, Robert Dryden, Bryna Raeburn, Jack Grimes

=== August ===
No. overall	No. in season	Title	Directed by	Written by	Original release date
126	126	"The Hit Man"	Himan Brown	Henry Slesar	August 1, 1974
A chance encounter with the wife of his next victim, and hearing the heartbreaking story that the couple shares, changes a hired assassin's mindset. Starring: Mike Kellin, Alan Manson, Earl Hammond, Lon Clark, Marian Seldes
127	127	"I Thought You Were Dead"	Himan Brown	Sam Dann	August 5, 1974
One year after murdering her husband and his writing partner, an author begins to receive phone calls from her deceased spouse, who wants to remind her of who possessed the real writing talent in their relationship. Starring: Arlene Francis, Mary Jane Higby, Guy Sorel, Robert Dryden
128	128	"The Headstrong Corpse"	Himan Brown	George Lowther	August 6, 1974
Set in 1874, this story of murder and mayhem finds the late Lord Burleigh of Moreland laid out in an open crypt (per his wishes; he feared being buried alive), but then his body mysteriously vanishes. Starring: Suzanne Grossman, Gordon Gould, Ann Pitoniak, Ian Martin, Court Benson, George Lowther
129	129	"The Picture of Dorian Gray"	Himan Brown	George Lowther	August 7, 1974
A handsome, narcissistic young man makes a devilish bargain in exchange for eternal youth; but as evil consumes him, his portrait changes to mirror the abomination he has become. Starring: Nick Pryor, Norman Rose, Roger De Koven, Marian Seldes; Adapted from the novel by Oscar Wilde
130	130	"You Only Die Once"	Himan Brown	Ian Martin	August 8, 1974
Marge Miller's blissfulness is shattered when her presumed-dead first husband returns to demand his share of the insurance money she received after his death. Starring: Joan Lorring, Joseph Julian, Dan Ocko, Hetty Galen, Tom Keena
131	131	"The Beach of Falesá"	Himan Brown	Ian Martin	August 12, 1974
After being outcast for marrying a local woman in defiance of the local faith, a South Sea island merchant must fight a voodoo religion and a shrewd business rival to regain his business, his pride, and his family's honor. Starring: Alexander Scourby, Evie Juster, Ian Martin, Robert Dryden; Adapted from the short story by Robert Louis Stevenson
132	132	"The Frontiers of Fear"	Himan Brown	Milt Wisoff	August 13, 1974
At a pawn shop, a down-on-his-luck hustler buys an old typewriter that has the power to prolifically type remarkable stories just by touching its keys. Starring: Jerry Stiller, Paul Tripp, Bryna Raeburn, Bob Kaliban
133	133	"Journey Into Terror"	Himan Brown	George Lowther	August 14, 1974
A police detective tells Jane Stoddard that her new husband, Tom, is a serial killer, and is asked to become bait in the cops' attempt to nab him. Starring: Roy Thinnes, Lynn Loring, Carol Teitel
134	134	"The Final Vow"	Himan Brown	Henry Slesar	August 15, 1974
Distraught after a priceless religious figurine in her possession is stolen, Sister Pamela leaves the convent to devote her time to finding the item and return it to a dying nun. Starring: Rosemary Rice, Bryna Raeburn, Ann Pitoniak, Jack Grimes, Joe Silver, Ken Harvey; Adapted by Slesar from his own short story
135	135	"The Hands of Mrs. Mallory"	Himan Brown	Henry Slesar	August 19, 1974
After a paralyzed Melinda West regains the ability to walk, the recently widowed Ida Mallory asks Melinda's doctor if the same "water of faith" he gave Melinda can help Ida regain the use of her own hands. Starring: Celeste Holm, Patricia Elliott, William Redfield, Evie Juster, Arnold Moss, Leon Janney
136	136	"A Preview of Death"	Himan Brown	Sam Dann	August 20, 1974
Despite reservations, an engineer certifies as safe a cable car at his family's mountain resort. His apprehensions increase when he has dreams of a young woman perishing in that same car. Starring: Russell Horton, Staats Cotsworth, Marian Seldes, Robert Dryden, Clarice Blackburn
137	137	"Having a Horrible Time"	Himan Brown	Bob Juhren	August 21, 1974
After her court testimony brings down a notorious New York drug lord, Amy Hastings and a friend vacation at a singles resort populated by lots of men — one of whom is out to murder Amy on the drug lord's behalf. Starring: Lynn Loring, Frances Sternhagen, Mandel Kramer, Ralph Bell, Nat Polen
138	138	"The Case of M.J.H."	Himan Brown	Henry Slesar	August 22, 1974
A con man persuades a psychiatrist's receptionist into stealing the doctor's private files so that he can blackmail the patients, one of whom plays a hard bargain. Starring: Augusta Dabney, Jack Grimes, Alan Hewitt, Robert Maxwell
139	139	"The Deadliest Favor"	Himan Brown	Sam Dann	August 26, 1974
Edmund Churchill does a favor by harboring an old friend who's on the lam from the law; it immediately causes trouble between Edmund and his wife. Starring: Norman Rose, Marian Seldes, Dan Ocko, Ralph Bell
140	140	"The Fatal Marksman"	Himan Brown	Ian Martin	August 28, 1974
To impress both the girl he loves and her father, an office clerk takes up hunting. His move breaks a vow he made to his late mother, who curses him into making bad shots; but another, more friendly spirit offers a way to reverse his errors — for a price. Starring: Michael Wager, Suzanne Grossman, Bryna Raeburn, Ian Martin, William Johnstone
141	141	"Medium Rare"	Himan Brown	George Lowther	August 29, 1974
Bilked out of big money while he was alive, the demanding ghost of a big-time gambler asks husband-and-wife false psychics to help exact revenge against a Las Vegas blackjack dealer and his wife, the ghost's ex-girlfriend. Starring: Joan Lovejoy, Robert Dryden, Mason Adams, Marian Seldes, George Petrie

=== September ===
No. overall	No. in season	Title	Directed by	Written by	Original release date
142	142	"The Return of Anatole Chevenic"	Himan Brown	Sidney Slon	September 2, 1974
Hans Chevenic works long hours for his sadistic shoemaker uncle Anatole, who in return gives meager pay and no assurance of an inheritance; it leaves Hans fantasizing about Anatole's death — a dream that may come true in ways Hans might not have imagined. Starring: Alexander Scourby, Gilbert Mack, Ann Pitoniak, Sidney Slon
143	143	"The Imp in the Bottle"	Himan Brown	Ian Martin	September 3, 1974
Barry Holden inherits an amulet containing an imp that can grant wishes of wealth... but to save his soul, Barry must sell the talisman for less than he paid for it. Starring: William Redfield, Joan Lorring, Santos Ortega, Ian Martin, Leon Janney; Adapted from the short story by Robert Louis Stevenson
144	144	"Deadline for Death"	Himan Brown	Arnold Moss	September 5, 1974
Sam Rogers testifies against his former partner-in-crime, Johnny Promo, but goes into seclusion in the wake of Johnny's promise that Sam will die within 30 days of his execution. Starring: Joseph Julian, Michael Tolan, June Gable, Guy Repp
145	145	"Double Exposure"	Himan Brown	Ian Martin	September 9, 1974
A cop's widow asks her police detective friend to investigate the backgrounds of two men: one claims she is his former neighbor; the other insists she's the ex-wife who abandoned him and his family years earlier. Starring: Kim Hunter, Larry Haines, Joan Shea, Sam Gray
146	146	"The Hand That Refused to Die"	Himan Brown	George Lowther	September 11, 1974
A gifted concert pianist is devastated when his right hand is amputated after an auto accident... and infuriated when he learns the procedure was unnecessary. Starring: Mandel Kramer, Carol Teitel, Marian Seldes, Russell Horton
147	147	"The Trouble with Murder"	Himan Brown	Ian Martin	September 12, 1974
Brooklyn police are baffled by the deaths of four women found naked and mutilated; the man responsible may be an artist who's been recruited to paint a nude picture of an aristocrat. Starring: Robert Morse, Bryna Raeburn, Evie Juster, Jackson Beck, Ian Martin
148	148	"What Happened to Mrs. Forbush?"	Himan Brown	Elizabeth Pennell	September 16, 1974
Marjorie & Bert Desmond and their son Robbie rent a long-abandoned seaside home for the summer. After they move in, the ghost of a sea captain's wife who lived there two centuries earlier warns Marjorie they'd better leave, lest Bert and Robbie become lost at sea... the same fate as the ghost's own husband and son. Starring: Patricia Wheel, Gordon Gould, Billie Lou Watt, Mary Jane Higby, Guy Sorel
149	149	"Thicker Than Water"	Himan Brown	Henry Slesar	September 17, 1974
A lawyer tries to prove to a jury — and to himself — that his mugger client is innocent of murder by asking to perform a chemical test on the knife allegedly used in the killing. Starring: Jay Gregory, Robert Dryden, Bob Kaliban, Grace Matthews, Ira Lewis
150	150	"The Garden"	Himan Brown	George Lowther	September 19, 1974
A man and woman find themselves imprisoned in a peculiar forest that has two sides: one is as deathly frightening as the giant presiding over it; the other as gentle and enticing as the woman who resides there. Starring: Jennifer Harmon, Jack Grimes, Nancy Coleman, Joe Silver
151	151	"Island of the Lost"	Himan Brown	Arnold Moss	September 23, 1974
A middle-aged man travels to an island resort to surprise his young beloved, but uncertainty about their relationship leads to doubts about himself. Starring: Norman Rose, Marian Seldes, Bob Kaliban, Ian Martin
152	152	"The Deadly Blind Man's Bluff"	Himan Brown	Ian Martin	September 25, 1974
Emotionally distraught after losing his sight in an accident, a construction worker still possesses a strong body and agile mind... traits that come in handy when he comes face-to-face with a murderer on the loose. Starring: Mason Adams, Augusta Dabney, Bryna Raeburn, Leon Janney, Earl Hammond
153	153	"The Spectral Bride"	Himan Brown	Ian Martin	September 26, 1974
"In older days, an alchemist was a man accorded most infinite respect..." but here, it's an alchemist's late daughter that demands respect, and her father's life-restoring potion, from her now-remarried husband. Starring: Michael Wager, Joan Lorring, Patricia Elliott, Robert Dryden, Jordan Charney
154	154	"Murder to Perfection"	Himan Brown	George Lowther	September 30, 1974
Nikki Carpenter is horrified when her fiancé's brother candidly confesses to murdering Nikki's sister, his previous wife. He says he tricked his wife, and others, into killing themselves... and promises that Nikki will be his next victim. Starring: Mercedes McCambridge, Joseph Campanella, John Newland

=== October ===
No. overall	No. in season	Title	Directed by	Written by	Original release date
155	155	"The Bride That Wasn't"	Himan Brown	George Lowther	October 1, 1974
Two weeks after becoming engaged, Amy Prentice travels to the home of her fiancé... who's already married, and has no recollection of ever meeting Amy. Starring: Janet Waldo, William Quinn, Anne Seymour, Lurene Tuttle, Bernard Barrow
156	156	"The Golden Blood of the Sun"	Himan Brown	Sam Dann	October 3, 1974
After moving from New England to Florida, a timeshare salesman hits a run of rainy days and bad luck. Believing him to be cursed, his boss sends the salesman to Mexico City... where he discovers that he's the reincarnation of an Aztec Prince. Starring: John Forsythe, Rita Gam, Arnold Moss, Barry Kroeger
157	157	"Sister of Death"	Himan Brown	Sam Dann	October 7, 1974
At a public auction, a recently married woman purchases a portrait that happens to depict her new husband's first wife... who was murdered during a robbery. Starring: K. T. Stevens, Amzie Strickland, Alan Reed, Bret Morrison
158	158	"Trapped"	Himan Brown	George Lowther	October 9, 1974
An ailing woman is convinced her husband and her new caregiver are plotting to kill her, and conspires with her old nurse to stay alive. Starring: Nina Foch, Charles Aidman, Joe DeSantis, Lesley Woods, Joan Tompkins
159	159	"The Doll"	Himan Brown	Henry Slesar	October 10, 1974
Jealous over the upcoming marriage of his old friend's daughter, an anthropologist arranges to have made a voodoo doll in the woman's likeness to stop the nuptials. Starring: Joanne Linville, Ross Martin, Virginia Gregg, Karl Swenson
160	160	"A Scaffold for Two"	Himan Brown	Sam Dann	October 14, 1974
Waylaid on a small island, a lawyer becomes witness to the locals' own brand of justice — a kangaroo court determined to hang a man who was already acquitted of murder on the mainland. Starring: John Beal, Bret Morrison, Denise Alexander, Casey Kasem
161	161	"Picture on a Wall"	Himan Brown	George Lowther	October 15, 1974
An aspiring stage ingenue finds a visitor in the courtyard of her new Greenwich Village apartment, a man who says he's the grandson — and is also the spitting image — of a figure on a painting in the apartment. Starring: Diane Baker, John Newland, Anne Seymour, Dennis Cole
162	162	"The Last Escape"	Himan Brown	Henry Slesar	October 17, 1974
Aging escape artist The Great Ferlini plans a headline-making endeavor, one that even Harry Houdini couldn't complete; his wife and her lover wants to make sure he does not succeed. Starring: Robert Dryden, Joan Lovejoy, Joseph Julian, Russell Horton, Bob Kaliban; Adapted by Slesar from his script for a 1961 episode of TV's Alfred Hitchcock Presents
163	163	"Mind Over Matthew"	Himan Brown	Elspeth Eric	October 21, 1974
A 40-year-old bachelor marries a woman half his age, but her power to heal leads him to believe she might be a witch. Starring: William Redfield, Evie Juster, Bryna Raeburn, Court Benson
164	164	"See Naples and Die"	Himan Brown	Ian Martin	October 23, 1974
A U.S. Senator fears for his daughter's well-being — and his political future — upon learning she's about to marry the target of his subcommittee's investigation, a known tax felon who's living in exile in Italy. Starring: Michael Wager, Dan Ocko, Ken Harvey, Marian Seldes, Larry Haines
165	165	"A Cage for Augie Karo"	Himan Brown	Sam Dann	October 24, 1974
Incarcerated criminal Augie Karo may have found a way out of prison when an elderly fellow inmate gives him a vial of powder that can put him to sleep for centuries. Starring: Leon Janney, Evie Juster, Robert Maxwell, Earl Hammond
166	166	"Possessed by the Devil"	Himan Brown	Ian Martin	October 28, 1974
A minister's young son is hospitalized with a supposedly fatal skull injury; the boy's recovery may be due to possession by a malign spirit. Starring: Donald Buka, Joan Shea, Ian Martin, Leon Janney, Guy Sorel
167	167	"The Black Room"	Himan Brown	Elspeth Eric	October 29, 1974
The story of a man who, for reasons undisclosed, is kidnapped and imprisoned in a room devoid of light and diversions; those who preceded him died or went insane, yet to his kidnappers' astonishment, he manages to survive. Starring: Larry Haines, George Petrie, Peter Collins
168	168	"The Demon Spirit"	Himan Brown	Milt Wisoff	October 31, 1974
After being told his betrothed's father gave her hand in marriage to another suitor, a student ponders using the evil skills he learned from a miracle worker to prevent the wedding. Starring: Norman Rose, Mason Adams, Marian Seldes, Jack Grimes, Nat Polen, Joe Silver; Based on The Dybbuk by S. Ansky

=== November ===
No. overall	No. in season	Title	Directed by	Written by	Original release date
169	169	"Bury Me Again"	Himan Brown	Henry Slesar	November 4, 1974
A survivor of a horrible train wreck assumes the name of a victim so that he and his wife can collect on the dead man's sizeable life insurance policy. Starring: Michael Tolan, Vicki Vola, Gilbert Mack, Mary Jane Higby, Robert Dryden.
170	170	"Terror on the Heath"	Himan Brown	Murray Burnett	November 6, 1974
A man becomes convinced he's the reincarnation of a famous 19th century murderer. Starring: Shepperd Strudwick, Marian Seldes, Lon Clark, William Redfield, Chris Gampel.
171	171	"How Eberhard Won His Wings"	Himan Brown	Arnold Moss	November 7, 1974
Timid bank teller Eberhard Edwards is so righteous to everyone that he literally grows angel wings; now the butt of embarrassing jokes, he and his wife must find a sinful way to shed them. Starring: Hans Conried, Marian Hailey, Jackson Beck, Bryna Raeburn, Martha Greenhouse, Arnold Moss.
172	172	"Wave of Terror"	Himan Brown	Ian Martin	November 11, 1974
As a great tidal wave heads for Hawaiʻi, two young lovers' proposed marriage is frowned upon by both the groom's mother (a Polynesian queen) and the bride's father (a wealthy plantation owner). Starring: Paul Hecht, Carmen Matthews, Gordon Gould, Suzanne Grossman, Ian Martin.
173	173	"I Must Kill Edna"	Himan Brown	Sam Dann	November 12, 1974
Soon after marrying an older, wealthy woman, a man begins an affair with a younger, aspiring stage actress. Starring: Elliot Reid, Joan Lorring, Evie Juster, Earl Hammond, Leon Janney.
174	174	"The 36th Man"	Himan Brown	Sam Dann	November 14, 1974
The Devil aims to tempt a shopkeeper in order to prevent him from joining a group of 36 righteous men who can save a sinful world. Starring: Ross Martin, Ann Pitoniak, Robert Harris, Carol Teitel, Robert Dryden.
175	175	"The Strange Voyage of the Lady Dee"	Himan Brown	Mary Jane Higby	November 18, 1974
A young couple and their daughter become lost in fog on a boat trip; a spirit lures them to a strange island whose lone inhabitant may not have the family's best interests at heart. Starring: Paul Hecht, Augusta Dabney, Corinne Orr, Dan Ocko, Margaret Barker.
176	176	"Tattooed for Murder"	Himan Brown	Nancy Moore	November 20, 1974
Two sisters join a carnival as tattooed women in order to insult and humiliate their domineering father... but one sister has a scheme to end his oppressiveness. Starring: Teri Keane, Stefan Schnabel, Rosemary Rice, Ralph Bell.
177	177	"The Death Watch"	Himan Brown	Ian Martin	November 21, 1974
A man wins a cursed pocket watch in a game of chance and becomes obsessed with keeping it wound. Starring: Jay Gregory, Marian Seldes, Robert Dryden, Ian Martin.
178	178	"The Sighting"	Himan Brown	Fielden Farrington	November 25, 1974
Sarah and David Hughes have different reactions after witnessing a UFO landing: He wants to deny what he saw, while she becomes amiable to the aliens. Starring: Kim Hunter, Nat Polen, Ralph Bell, Joe Silver, Robert Dryden.
179	179	"Courtyard of Death"	Himan Brown	Murray Burnett	November 26, 1974
The tale of Grigori Rasputin, the lecherous monk who became advisor to Russian Emperor Nicholas II and his family. Starring: Norman Rose, Ann Pitoniak, Mason Adams, Jean Gillespie, Jackson Beck, Roger De Koven
180	180	"The Aaron Burr Murder Case"	Himan Brown	Sam Dann	November 28, 1974
A movie recreation of the Burr–Hamilton duel ends with the actor playing Aaron Burr fatally shooting the man portraying Alexander Hamilton. The ensuing police investigation determines the culprit: The real Aaron Burr. Starring: Jack Grimes, George Petrie, Joan Shea, William Redfield, Leon Janney

=== December ===
No. overall	No. in season	Title	Directed by	Written by	Original release date
181	181	"The Dice of Doom"	Himan Brown	Ian Martin	December 2, 1974
Through the use of two special dice, a 19th century gambler tries to outwit The Devil and alter the fate he was bound to by an ancestor's mistake. Starring: Michael Wager, Carol Teitel, Gordon Gould, Ian Martin, Robert Dryden
182	182	"A Bride for Death"	Himan Brown	Sam Dann	December 4, 1974
An unlucky poet finds love and affection from a neighbor, a melancholic woman awaiting her fiancé's return from the war. The question is... which war? Starring: Tony Roberts, Bryna Raeburn, Marian Seldes, Earl Hammond
183	183	"The Body Snatchers"	Himan Brown	Ian Martin	December 5, 1974
The sight of a medical school classmate prompts a drunkard to ruefully recall how he got caught up in a sordid trade — robbing graves to sell cadavers to the school "in the name of medicine and research". Starring: Howard DaSilva, Patricia Elliott, Ralph Bell, Court Benson, Ken Harvey; Adapted from Robert Louis Stevenson's short story "The Body Snatcher"
184	184	"The Fatal Connection"	Himan Brown	Fielden Farrington	December 9, 1974
Expectant couple Hal & Norma Glenford inherit a New York City brownstone once owned by Hal's great-grandfather; the home contains 1890s decor, including an antique phone that sends the Glenfords back in time to relieve their ancestors' sordid, unscrupulous lives. Starring: Jennifer Harmon, Nick Pryor, Robert Maxwell, Joan Shea
185	185	"The Damned Thing"	Himan Brown	Arnold Moss	December 10, 1974
A coroner conducts an inquest into a wealthy man's death; witnesses offer different recollections of the incident, including one who says the victim died at the hands of an invisible creature. Starring: Robert Dryden, Joan Tompkins, Arnold Moss, Bob Kaliban, Evie Juster; Adapted from the short story by Ambrose Bierce
186	186	"Is the Lady Dead?"	Himan Brown	Sam Dann	December 12, 1974
While on a trip to England, American businessman Barney Kreuger marries a woman on a whim. But two weeks after the nuptials, his wife dies, causing Barney to become obsessed with bringing her back to life — even if it costs him his fortune. Starring: Larry Haines, Joan Lorring, Ann Pitoniak, Leon Janney
187	187	"Stephanie's Room"	Himan Brown	Bob Juhren	December 16, 1974
After a housewife moves with her husband back to her hometown of New York City, she visits the house in which she grew up, soon developing a symbiotic relationship with the aged, childless woman who now resides there. Starring: Mercedes McCambridge, Mary Jane Higby, Robert Dryden, William Redfield
188	188	"Charity Is Never Dead"	Himan Brown	Ian Martin	December 18, 1974
Two patients are brought into a hospital ER: An elderly woman, badly injured in a department store explosion, who cannot find the granddaughter she was just reunited with; and a younger woman with a head injury and amnesia. Starring: Virginia Payne, Rosemary Rice, William Prince, Patricia Wheel, George Petrie
189	189	"The House of the Voodoo Queen"	Himan Brown	Murray Burnett	December 19, 1974
The story of a New Orleans house haunted by a malicious spirit; the couple who just inherited it; and another woman who seduces the husband in order to gain possession of it. Starring: Jordan Charney, Joan Lorring, Gilbert Mack, Renee Roy, Dan Ocko
190	190	"Give the Devil His Due"	Himan Brown	Nancy Moore	December 23, 1974
An over-the-hill dancer sells her soul to the devil to regain her youth and talent... but consequences arise when she reneges on the deal. Starring: Mercedes McCambridge, Joe Silver, Ian Martin, Bryna Raeburn, Peter Donald
191	191	"A Very Private Miracle"	Himan Brown	Ian Martin	December 24, 1974
A touching Christmas tale about a cantankerous multimillionaire and a little girl who wants him to play Santa Claus. Starring: Howard DaSilva, Jennifer Marlowe, Evie Juster, Virginia Payne, Ian Martin
192	192	"Turnabout is Foul Play"	Himan Brown	Sidney Slon	December 26, 1974
A man conspires with his girlfriend to kill his wealthy, sickly wife. He changes his mind at the last moment, but someone carries out the job. Now, with the evidence he created pointing toward him, the man must try to prove his innocence. Starring: Mason Adams, Vicki Vola, Marian Seldes, Jackson Beck, Sidney Slon
193	193	"The Golem"	Himan Brown	Sam Dann	December 30, 1974
As a man tries to save a young Jewish woman and her grandfather from Nazi pursuers, the old man begins to construct a creature from ancient Hebrew legend to save them. Starring: Robert Lansing, Mildred Clinton, Patricia Elliott, Ralph Bell, Robert Dryden

== Sources ==
- Payton, Gordon; Grams, Martin Jr. (January 1999), The CBS radio mystery theater: an episode guide and handbook to nine years of broadcasting, 1974-1982, McFarland & Company, Inc., ISBN 0-7864-0559-7
