= List of CBS Radio Mystery Theater episodes (1978 season) =

Season of American radio series

This is an episode list for the 1978 season of the radio drama series CBS Radio Mystery Theater. The series premiered on CBS on January 6, 1974, and ended on December 31, 1982. A set of 1,399 original episodes aired between January 1974 and December 1982. The series was broadcast every day of the week for the first six years with re-runs filling in empty slots starting in February 1974. All episodes are available free at the Internet Archive.

== List of episodes ==
Episode list	# of episodes
List of CBS Radio Mystery Theater episodes (1974 season)	193
List of CBS Radio Mystery Theater episodes (1975 season)	212
List of CBS Radio Mystery Theater episodes (1976 season)	170
List of CBS Radio Mystery Theater episodes (1977 season)	186
List of CBS Radio Mystery Theater episodes (1978 season)	176
List of CBS Radio Mystery Theater episodes (1979 season)	106
List of CBS Radio Mystery Theater episodes (1980 season)	97
List of CBS Radio Mystery Theater episodes (1981 season)	132
List of CBS Radio Mystery Theater episodes (1982 season)	127

== 1978 episodes ==
=== January ===
No. overall	No. in season	Title	Directed by	Written by	Original release date
762	1	"Peter, Peter, Pumpkin Eater"	Himan Brown	Sam Dann	January 2, 1978
Unrespected at both work and home, Peter Perkins creates fantasies in which he is the infallible hero. But eventually, just as in his real life, the criticisms from others permeate into his dream state. Starring: Fred Gwynne
763	2	"Family Album"	Himan Brown	Roy Winsor	January 4, 1978
After arriving in Europe to report on the death of a notorious gangster, a reporter's behavior turns strange. His investigation leads him to an underworld where the crook isn't dead… yet. Starring: Paul Hecht
764	3	"The Laughing Maiden"	Himan Brown	Percy Granger	January 13, 1978
Three sailors try to locate Captain Kidd's treasure while eluding both a mysterious organization that's seeking the loot and the curse of the dead pirate. Starring: Norman Rose, Arnold Moss, William Griffis
765	4	"In Another Place"	Himan Brown	Sam Dann	January 16, 1978
A rich, young couple believe they've committed a flawlessly executed crime. The local sheriff knows they did it, but can't quite prove it. Starring: Fred Gwynne, Court Benson, Evie Juster, Gilbert Mack
766	5	"A Model Murderer"	Himan Brown	Ian Martin	January 17, 1978
A traveling salesman poses as a charming photographer to rape young models; he's able to elude suspicion… until he one day progresses to murder. Starring: Larry Haines, Marian Seldes
767	6	"Sophia and the Pilgrim"	Himan Brown	G. Frederick Lewis	January 19, 1978
A gentleman steps in after his friend's daughter falls under the spell of a traveling Pied Piper-like mystic; the guru has a propensity of luring young women into leaving their homes and families, forgetting their pasts… and into eventual states of depression and death. Starring: Gordon Heath, Jada Rowland, Robert Dryden, Bryna Raeburn, Russell Horton
768	7	"The Enchanted Child"	Himan Brown	Elspeth Eric	January 20, 1978
Using just the force of his thoughts, a young boy has the power to kill people at will, in particular those who speak positively about death in his presence. The boy's parents become suspicious… and fearful that they might be his next victims. Starring: Teri Keane, Ralph Bell
769	8	"The Forgetful Ghost"	Himan Brown	Ian Martin	January 23, 1978
An affable spirit returns to the world of the living for an altruistic purpose he's forgotten. Instead, he teams with a living mortal to pull off a card hustle to benefit the ghost's living daughter. Starring: Mandel Kramer, Ian Martin, Martha Greenhouse
770	9	"Ranee of Rajputana"	Himan Brown	Sam Dann	January 24, 1978
A copper statue of "The Queen of Thieves" lures a deceitful stockbroker into a lucrative career as a thief. When the statue talks him into committing murder, the man finds his back to the wall. Starring: Kevin McCarthy, Marian Seldes
771	10	"The Safety Match"	Himan Brown	Percy Granger	January 26, 1978
With a spent match as their only clue, two detectives make great progress on solving a mysterious murder… until suddenly everything stops making sense. Starring: Robert Dryden, Russell Horton; Adapted from a story by Anton Chekhov
772	11	"The Defectors"	Himan Brown	Sam Dann	January 27, 1978
After catching a married senator in a compromising situation with another woman, a foreign spy blackmails the lawmaker into backing legislation that may hurt U.S. interests. His patriotism being stronger than his morals, the senator fights back. Starring: Fred Gwynne, Bryna Raeburn, Robert Kaliban, Ken Harvey
773	12	"Yesterday's Giant"	Himan Brown	G. Frederick Lewis	January 30, 1978
After a nuclear test in remote Nevada, a pair of scientists discover a family of Neanderthals; they use the living fossils for their own agendas. Starring: Norman Rose, Ralph Bell, Howard Ross
774	13	"The Ice Palace"	Himan Brown	Percy Granger	January 31, 1978
Sailors on an ice-breaking mission find that the polar ice caps are melting. When the pilot sent to investigate disappears, a team is dispatched to find out why. Starring: Tony Roberts, Earl Hammond, Arnold Moss, Ian Martin

=== February ===
No. overall	No. in season	Title	Directed by	Written by	Original release date
775	14	"Don't Look Back"	Himan Brown	Sam Dann	February 2, 1978
A famous country singer falls for a small-town girl he meets at a service station… but she is reluctant to reciprocate, fearful that the singer's manager will do anything, even commit murder, to keep her out of his life. Starring: Don Scardino, Marian Seldes
776	15	"The Postmistress of Laurel Run"	Himan Brown	G. Frederick Lewis	February 3, 1978
The titular character works to save an admiring Postal Service colleague from the next town over, after the latter is subjected to a criminal inquiry about the theft of money transferred between the two towns. Starring: Marian Seldes; Adapted from a story by Bret Harte
777	16	"The Talking Women"	Himan Brown	Sam Dann	February 6, 1978
An unscrupulous, adulterous man decides to change his ways both professionally and maritally. But when his ex-mistress is found dead, a blackmailer appears. Starring: Ed Ames
778	17	"Dr. Heidegger's Experiment"	Himan Brown	Percy Granger	February 7, 1978
An old doctor offers his old schoolmates water from the Fountain of Youth, part of an experiment to see if his friends will repeat their youthful mistakes if given a second chance to be young. Starring: Gordon Heath, Robert Dryden, Mary Jane Higby, Guy Sorel; Adapted from the short story by Nathaniel Hawthorne
779	18	"All Unregistered Aliens"	Himan Brown	Victoria Dann	February 9, 1978
A doctor treats an illegal immigrant with a gunshot wound. But when the patient dies, his body vanishes… and it's not a cheap trick. Starring: Ann Williams
780	19	"Reflected Terror"	Himan Brown	Sam Dann	February 10, 1978
A young woman tells a gothic tale of her employment at a country manor, where its lord does not permit mirrors — lest he be forced to see the image of the wife he murdered. Starring: Marian Seldes, Russell Horton, Court Benson, Bryna Raeburn
781	20	"Nighteyes"	Himan Brown	Sam Dann	February 13, 1978
A race track stable hand is killed after discovering that a slow racehorse has been replaced by a nearly identical horse. But when bizarre coincidences blow the lid off the plan, the horse owner's wife sets out to sort out the facts. Starring: Ralph Bell, Earl Hammond, Joan Lovejoy, Sam Gray
782	21	"Revenge is Sweet"	Himan Brown	G. Frederick Lewis	February 14, 1978
After serving a prison sentence for a crime he didn't commit, a former swindler leads a clean life as an upscale athletic club employee. But when a club member frames him for pilfering a wallet, the ex-con risks a return to jail to get revenge. Starring: Mandel Kramer, Lloyd Battista, Robert Dryden, William Griffis; Adapted from the Guy de Maupassant short story "The Piece of String"
783	22	"Something in the Air"	Himan Brown	Elspeth Eric	February 16, 1978
A father attempts to stop his young daughter from marrying an older, poorer man. But a strange psychic link seems to re-attract the lovers. Starring: Gordon Heath, Ralph Bell, Ann Williams, Corrine Orr
784	23	"The Church of Hell"	Himan Brown	Ian Martin	February 17, 1978
A couple returns from vacation to find the tenant and caretaker of their home has been murdered, and must fight off supernatural forces to reclaim their domicile. Starring: Roberta Maxwell, Paul Hecht, Lloyd Battista, Roger DeKoven
785	24	"Angel from England"	Himan Brown	G. Frederick Lewis	February 20, 1978
The true story of a nurse who risked her life to help more than 200 British soldiers escape occupied Belgium during World War I. Starring: Marian Seldes
786	25	"A Phantom Yesterday"	Himan Brown	Ian Martin	February 21, 1978
A renowned actress must use her wartime espionage experience to save herself from the clutches of a Nazi war criminal after returning to her native Germany. Starring: Kim Hunter, Michael Tolan, Arnold Moss, Ray Owens
787	26	"Vanishing Lady"	Himan Brown	Murray Burnett	February 23, 1978
With no help from police, local press, or even her mother, Peter Carlsen investigates the disappearance of his true love, Lois… only to suspect a convoluted plot upon seeing a curious stranger caring for Lois' fish. Starring: Tony Roberts, Evelyn Juster, Russell Horton, Nat Polen
788	27	"Loser Take All"	Himan Brown	Arnold Moss	February 24, 1978
A young man appears to be content at being second fiddle to a friend who seems more capable than him at everything. But the man has a plan to put himself ahead in at least one area. Starring: Paul Hecht, Russell Horton; Adapted from a story by Peter Bulwer Lytton
789	28	"Second Sight"	Himan Brown	Percy Granger	February 27, 1978
Larry Millard is framed and executed for a murder he didn't commit. The evil businessman who did commit the crime receives Millard's eyes in a surgical transplant… and begins seeing things he never expected to afterwards. Starring: Court Benson, Earl Hammond, Bryna Raeburn, Robert Kaliban
790	29	"A Message from Space"	Himan Brown	Ian Martin	February 28, 1978
A reporter tries to disprove the existence of UFOs, but a first-hand encounter forces him to change his views on the subject. Starring: Tony Roberts

=== March ===
No. overall	No. in season	Title	Directed by	Written by	Original release date
791	30	"You Tell Me Your Dream"	Himan Brown	Sam Dann	March 2, 1978
A psychiatrist tries to help a wealthy businessman with constant dreams about death. But then she starts having those same dreams. Starring: Teri Keane, Ralph Bell, Robert Dryden
792	31	"The Assassin"	Himan Brown	Murray Burnett	March 3, 1978
A professional hit man suffers amnesia after a car accident, then tries to reconstruct his life and his memory in order to fulfill the biggest assignment he's ever had to carry out. Starring: Larry Haines
793	32	"The House and the Brain"	Himan Brown	Percy Granger	March 6, 1978
The persistent appearance of a spirit at a local house prompts two men to investigate a mysterious tale of intrigue spanning over 100 years. Starring: Gordon Heath, Robert Dryden, Court Benson; Adapted from a novelette by Edward Bulwer-Lytton
794	33	"The Red Scarf"	Himan Brown	Sam Dann	March 7, 1978
A woman ditches her lover after he kills her husband. But the paramour isn't about to let her go. Starring: Ralph Bell, Teri Keane, Bryna Raeburn, Russell Horton
795	34	"The Instant Millionaires"	Himan Brown	Ian Martin	March 9, 1978
Despite having moral reservations, three warehouse workers quit their jobs after splitting $3 million cash they found in an old trunk. Years later, they learn that money doesn't bring contentment… and that the criminal figure who hid the cash in the trunk is hunting them down. Starring: Bob Kaliban, Ray Owens, Ian Martin, Evelyn Juster, Ralph Bell
796	35	"Who Is George Williams?"	Himan Brown	G. Frederick Lewis	March 10, 1978
An amnesiac stumbles into an Alaskan cabin during a blizzard and is cared for by its occupants. A year later, after the man earns a job as a police officer, he is asked to work a case of discovered human remains… and begins to realize he may be responsible. Starring: Larry Haines, Robert Dryden, Court Benson, Joan Shay
797	36	"The Wheel of Life"	Himan Brown	Sam Dann	March 13, 1978
A Vietnam War vet runs into an old Army buddy he thought perished in combat. Turns out the friend is a leader in a growing political movement — an ascent that fate has preordained. Starring: Russell Horton, Lloyd Battista
798	37	"The Impossible Is True"	Himan Brown	Ian Martin	March 14, 1978
Police offer to help a young woman haunted by images of ghosts and the Grim Reaper after inheriting a family estate. Starring: Anne Williams, Catherine Byers, Michael Wager, Paul Hecht, Earl Hammond
799	38	"The Time Fold"	Himan Brown	Ian Martin	March 16, 1978
Turbulence causes a corporate jet to be thrust into a space-time anomaly; when its passengers are rescued by the residents of a space station, they learn they've been thrust 1000 years into the future. Starring: Paul Hecht, Ian Martin, Evelyn Juster, Fred Gwynne
800	39	"Identified Flying Objects"	Himan Brown	Sam Dann	March 17, 1978
An alien sees his spacecraft impounded after he's stopped for a traffic violation. A young Earth woman lends him the money to get the ship out of hock… and joins him on a journey back to his home planet. Starring: Bryna Raeburn, Earl Hammond
801	40	"All Things Are Possible"	Himan Brown	G. Frederick Lewis	March 20, 1978
An innocent man struggles to keep his faith in God after he is framed and imprisoned for murdering a colleague at a sales convention. Starring: Paul Hecht
802	41	"The Golden Amulet"	Himan Brown	Roy Winsor	March 21, 1978
An ancient Japanese ghost story involving a samurai's son who reaps bad karma after falling in love with a ghost. Starring: Tony Roberts, Bob Dryden, Evelyn Juster
803	42	"The Judas Kiss"	Himan Brown	Elspeth Eric	March 23, 1978
A misogynistic clairvoyant witnesses a woman commit the murders of her boyfriend and her husband. Starring: Fred Gwynne, Teri Keane, Lloyd Battista, Don Scardino
804	43	"Wise Child"	Himan Brown	Sam Dann	March 24, 1978
A couple discovers and adopts an abandoned baby at a hotel, but worries when it appears the child does not seem to grow or mature. Starring: Ralph Bell, Ann Williams
805	44	"The Pretend Person"	Himan Brown	Elspeth Eric	March 27, 1978
Imaginary friends assist a woman dealing with recuperation from open heart surgery and other issues in her life. Starring: Teri Keane
806	45	"The Ghost in the Well"	Himan Brown	Murray Burnett	March 28, 1978
The ghost of a woman who died after falling down a well tells her tale to an artist… who feels strangely compelled to paint her picture — over and over again. Starring: Tony Roberts, Patricia Elliott
807	46	"Big City Blues"	Himan Brown	G. Frederick Lewis	March 30, 1978
After a newlywed couple is robbed in the big city, media attention inspires the public and the government to give them monetary aid. But things turn pear-shaped after the couple is arrested for passing bad checks. Starring: Russell Horton, Marian Hailey
808	47	"Shark Bait"	Himan Brown	Sam Dann	March 31, 1978
A gambler schemes to pay off his debts by enlisting his bookie's help to murder his brother and aunt and inherit their wealth. Starring: Tony Roberts

=== April ===
No. overall	No. in season	Title	Directed by	Written by	Original release date
809	48	"Fortune's Favorite"	Himan Brown	Sam Dann	April 3, 1978
An elderly spinster smells a con when she's randomly selected to receive free vacations from a rich benefactor. Starring: Mary Jane Higby, Earl Hammond, Joan Shay, William Griffis
810	49	"Delusion of Reprieve"	Himan Brown	Percy Granger	April 4, 1978
A police investigator, Jewish by descent, struggles to solve the murder mysteries surrounding former members of the German Schutzstaffel who were expatriated to the United States. Starring: Paul Hecht
811	50	"A Tragedy of Error"	Himan Brown	G. Frederick Lewis	April 6, 1978
Repulsed by her tyrant husband and adoring her sweet yet diffident lover, a woman enlists the help of a mysterious boatman and a ghost in a graveyard to put her life in order. Starring: Tammy Grimes, Robert Dryden, Fred Gwynne, Russell Horton; Adapted from a short story by Henry James
812	51	"The Parasite"	Himan Brown	G. Frederick Lewis	April 7, 1978
Long dismissive of the power of hypnosis, a university professor soon changes his mind… and starts believing a beautiful hypnotist is trying to seduce him. Starring: Norman Rose, Bryna Raeburn, Robert Kaliban, G. Frederick Lewis; Adapted from the novelette by Arthur Conan Doyle
813	52	"Childish Laughter"	Himan Brown	Sam Dann	April 10, 1978
After wrecking his car to avoid hitting a little child, a scientist finds himself isolated in a remote home, where tormented memories and the sound of a girl's laughter soon plague him. Starring: Alexander Scourby, Lori March, Court Benson
814	53	"Blackmail"	Himan Brown	Roy Winsor	April 11, 1978
The daughter of a Hollywood celebrity finds herself the target of a blackmailing scheme thanks to a photo that shows her in the embrace of an infamous gangster. Starring: Larry Haines, Teri Keane, Jada Rowland
815	54	"The Shriek of the Mandrake"	Himan Brown	Percy Granger	April 13, 1978
A film crew is attacked by a spirit occupying the ancient manor house they're using for a movie shoot. Starring: Anne Williams, Ian Martin, Paul Hecht, Ray Owens
816	55	"Chapter of Errors"	Himan Brown	Ian Martin	April 14, 1978
A modest art dealer is robbed of a valuable Picasso painting; when he places an ad asking the robber to return it, more than one person responds… and disastrous consequences result. Starring: Court Benson, Bryna Raeburn, Russell Horton, Ian Martin
817	56	"Murder at Troyte's Hill"	Himan Brown	G. Frederick Lewis	April 17, 1978
In Victorian-era England, a female detective and a Scotland Yard officer team to solve the murder of a gamekeeper and his dog on an ancient estate. Starring: Marian Hailey, Robert Dryden, Earl Hammond, Ray Owens; Adapted from a story by Catherine Louisa Pirkis
818	57	"Uncle Louis"	Himan Brown	Sam Dann	April 18, 1978
A young police detective falls in love with a witness while gathering proof against a known mobster… who discovers a secret from the investigator's past. Starring: Tony Roberts, Ann Williams, Ralph Bell, Jackson Beck, Ken Harvey
819	58	"The Avocado Jungle"	Himan Brown	Elspeth Eric	April 20, 1978
An aging actress, being assisted by a writer in composing her autobiography, divulges a deep secret that winds up recorded on tape. Starring: Larry Haines, Teri Keane, Howard Ross, Lois Kibbee
820	59	"Bet with Angels"	Himan Brown	Murray Burnett	April 21, 1978
Gambling fever overcomes an amiable advertising professional after he receives betting advice from his deceased friend, who himself was an addicted gambler. Starring: Mason Adams, Mandel Kramer, Marian Seldes
821	60	"The Grandee of Terra Loco"	Himan Brown	Percy Granger	April 24, 1978
A big-city reporter travels to a small Texas town to do a posthumous profile on a famously honest politician; he discovers that the mayor had a private personal background that the locals prefer to keep secret. Starring: Paul Hecht, Robert Dryden, Joan Shay, Earl Hammond
822	61	"International Dateline"	Himan Brown	Ian Martin	April 25, 1978
A womanizing World War II pilot keeps his wife on one side of the International Dateline and his lover (a lieutenant/nurse who cared for him while he was in a coma) on the other. Trouble arises when the two women meet and the pilot starts being pursued by a malevolent ghost. Starring: Michael Tolan, Evie Juster, Ian Martin
823	62	"The Queen of Palmyra"	Himan Brown	Sam Dann	April 27, 1978
Worried that his uncle is being conned, a financier's nephew asks a private eye to investigate an enigmatic woman the financier has become acquainted with; she claims to be the reincarnation of an ancient Roman empress. Starring: Fred Gwynne, Bryna Raeburn, Jack Grimes, Court Benson
824	63	"The House on Chimney Pot Lane"	Himan Brown	Bob Juhren	April 28, 1978
A professional couple buy a home infamous for the disappearance of its former inhabitants… and for housing a mysterious painting that seems to come to life. Starring: Marian Seldes, Teri Keane, Earl Hammond, Sam Gray

=== May ===
No. overall	No. in season	Title	Directed by	Written by	Original release date
825	64	"A Drink with Dionysius"	Himan Brown	Sam Dann	May 1, 1978
A nuclear warhead (poetically named after the Greek god of wine) falls into the hands of a petty thief and swindler, who attempts to sell it to a foreign agent. Starring: Fred Gwynne
826	65	"The Figure in the Moonlight"	Himan Brown	Roy Winsor	May 2, 1978
The search is on for the meaning of a mysterious engraving that depicts not only a Victorian mansion… but also a mysterious figure acting out a long-forgotten crime. Starring: Patricia Elliott, Paul Hecht; An adaptation of a M. R. James short story
827	66	"Journey to Somewhere"	Himan Brown	Ian Martin	May 4, 1978
A train carries lost souls to a wintry town, where the spirits are destined for their own unique reasons. Starring: Carol Teitel, Russell Horton, Norman Rose, Evelyn Juster
828	67	"Cool Killer Carl"	Himan Brown	G. Frederick Lewis	May 5, 1978
The mother of a victimized family befriends an infamous killer who took them hostage while hiding from the police. Starring: Mason Adams, Marian Seldes
829	68	"Death and Desire"	Himan Brown	Elspeth Eric	May 8, 1978
Two retired circus actors fabricate a scheme of passing themselves off as fake mediums. But problems arise when one spirit dies. Starring: Mercedes McCambridge, Robert Dryden
830	69	"Room 418"	Himan Brown	Sam Dann	May 9, 1978
A man charms his way into renting an already-reserved room at a fully-booked hotel. But problems arise when the room's rightful guest turns up. Starring: Michael Tolan, Carol Teitel
831	70	"The Guilt of the Innocent"	Himan Brown	G. Frederick Lewis	May 11, 1978
A young, poor, and naive transient in a Russian harbor town falls for a master thief's trickery. Starring: Fred Gwynne, Bob Kaliban; Adapted from a story by Maxim Gorky
832	71	"The Secret of Shen-Si"	Himan Brown	Arnold Moss	May 12, 1978
College professor Joshua Neale becomes worried when his former actress wife, Maddy, suddenly begins recounting minute personal experiences of the sinking of the Titanic. It's only the start of Maddy's recollections. Starring: Carol Teitel, Arnold Moss
833	72	"Edmund Orme"	Himan Brown	Roy Winsor	May 15, 1978
A young man is thwarted by a ghost every time he starts to propose marriage to the woman he loves. The woman's mother offers some explanation. Starring: Lamont Johnson, Gordon Gould, Mary Jane Higby, Jada Rowland; Adapted from a story by Henry James
834	73	"Girl Talk"	Himan Brown	Sam Dann	May 16, 1978
Two women who were friends in high school reconnect to take stock of their lives. One has chosen to be a homemaker, the other a lawmaker… and one of the two is contemplating committing murder. Starring: Teri Keane, Anne Williams
835	74	"Time Out of Mind"	Himan Brown	Percy Granger	May 18, 1978
Unconscious and hospitalized following a car accident, a college student journeys through time and takes the place of his uncle during World War II, when he must fulfill a task to aid the man who would be his father. Starring: Russell Horton, Lloyd Battista, Ian Martin
836	75	"The Hundred Dollar Difference"	Himan Brown	Sam Dann	May 19, 1978
A down-on-his-luck gambler conspires with his girlfriend to murder his wealthy aunt and obtain her fortune. But he finds that the job has already been carried out for him. Starring: Mason Adams, Carol Teitel
837	76	"The Girl He Left Behind"	Himan Brown	Percy Granger	May 22, 1978
A soldier on leave from the Army proposes to his girlfriend, who rejects him under pressure from her mother. When the soldier dies in a car crash, his ghost returns to haunt the woman. Starring: Anne Williams, Robert Dryden
838	77	"Window to Oblivion"	Himan Brown	Ian Martin	May 23, 1978
Spirit mediums attempt to establish communications with the widow of a World War II pilot who disappeared while on routine patrol over the Bermuda Triangle. Starring: Russell Horton, Teri Keane, Ian Martin, Bryce Bond
839	78	"The Spy and the Traitor"	Himan Brown	G. Frederick Lewis	May 25, 1978
A fictionalized narration of Benedict Arnold's betrayal of West Point to the British during the American Revolutionary War. Starring: Gordon Heath
840	79	"Arctic Encounter"	Himan Brown	Sam Dann	May 26, 1978
American and Soviet planes crash in the Arctic Circle after encountering an energy-draining dead spot near the North Pole; the surviving crews are left to encounter a new, peculiar world. Starring: Mason Adams, Mandel Kramer, Bryna Raeburn
841	80	"The Rich Ostrich"	Himan Brown	G. Frederick Lewis	May 29, 1978
An ostrich from a circus snatches and swallows a sizable, valuable diamond from an Arab diplomat. Starring: Don Scardino, Patricia Elliott
842	81	"The Bittersweet Honeymoon"	Himan Brown	Ian Martin	May 30, 1978
A honeymooning couple believe themselves lucky when a cruise line erroneously puts them up in a ship's luxury suite. But their minds soon change when a nine-fingered thief breaks into their suite. Starring: Jada Rowland, Russell Horton, Ian Martin, Gordon Heath

=== June ===
No. overall	No. in season	Title	Directed by	Written by	Original release date
843	82	"The Silent Woman"	Himan Brown	Percy Granger	June 1, 1978
A woman goes into a 27-year-long silent state after being forced into a marriage against her wishes. Starring: John Beal, Robert Dryden, Norman Rose, Carol Teitel, Joan Shay; Adapted from a short story by Leopold Kompert
844	83	"Diamond Cut Diamond"	Himan Brown	G. Frederick Lewis	June 2, 1978
A con artist poses as a psychic and pulls off a swindle on a wealthy man vacationing in Monte Carlo. Starring: Fred Gwynne, Norman Rose, Earl Hammond, Barbara Sohmers
845	84	"The Undying Heart"	Himan Brown	Ian Martin	June 5, 1978
Instead of handing off the $50,000 his bookie owes to a gangster, gambler Sid Parks loses it at the roulette wheel; needing to recoup the loss, Sid ponders icing off his rich aunt, whose life insurance policy designates Sid as beneficiary. Starring: Mandel Kramer, Bryna Raeburn
846	85	"Miracle in Sharon City"	Himan Brown	Sam Dann	June 6, 1978
The titular city's mayor is hailed as a job creator for luring a chemical manufacturer to town, but learning from an ex-employee about terrifying side effects from the company's products gives him second thoughts. Starring: John Beal
847	86	"Death Spell"	Himan Brown	Elspeth Eric	June 8, 1978
A starving artist and his actress wife move into the estate of a wealthy friend, who believes his spouse wants to kill him with black magic. Starring: Ralph Bell, Joan Lovejoy
848	87	"A Long Way from Home"	Himan Brown	Arnold Moss	June 9, 1978
Two buddies enlist in the Union Army during the Civil War and agree to look after each other in battle. But when the fighting gets hot and heavy, one friend cuts and runs… and faces dire consequences after the other is mortally wounded. Starring: Russell Horton, Arnold Moss, Evelyn Juster, Lloyd Battista; Adapted from a story by Ambrose Bierce
849	88	"Alias Mr. Aladdin"	Himan Brown	Roy Winsor	June 12, 1978
A scheming woman and her loser paramour attempt to discover where her late husband kept his money, while the deceased's best friend tries to impede them. Starring: John Beal, Robert Dryden, Teri Keane, Roberta Maxwell
850	89	"Charlie, the Actor"	Himan Brown	Sam Dann	June 14, 1978
A police officer is assigned to protect the king of an obscure country during his visit to the U.S. The cop, however, immediately recognizes the monarch as an escaped convict from his old neighborhood. Starring: Leon Janney, Earl Hammond, Bryna Raeburn
851	90	"The Unholy Miracle"	Himan Brown	Ian Martin	June 16, 1978
A couple discovers that the daughter they adopted from Russia 20 years earlier may be the product of a strange Soviet experiment. Starring: Mandel Kramer, Carol Teitel, Betsy Beard, Ian Martin, Barbara Sohmers
852	91	"Dr. Jekyll and Mrs. Hyde"	Himan Brown	G. Frederick Lewis	June 19, 1978
A police sheriff elucidates the twisted story of a successful couple who disappeared under mysterious circumstances. Starring: William Prince, Earl Hammond, Evelyn Juster
853	92	"A Matter of Faith"	Himan Brown	Percy Granger	June 21, 1978
On a trip to Rio de Janeiro, a businessman encounters a woman who bears a strong resemblance to a long lost love executed during a revolution 12 years earlier. Despite witnessing that execution, he is certain she is the same woman; she, however, doesn't know who he is talking about. Starring: Michael Wager, Carol Teitel
854	93	"The Black Door"	Himan Brown	G. Frederick Lewis	June 23, 1978
Before receiving an inheritance on his 21st birthday, Michael Cartwright is forced to live in an ancient mansion; the key to said inheritance lies behind a secret room in the mansion's top floor. Starring: Kevin McCarthy, Russell Horton, Guy Sorel; Adapted from a story by Arthur Conan Doyle
855	94	"Lady Bluebeard"	Himan Brown	Sam Dann	June 26, 1978
Luana Pilbeam is an attractive 35-year-old who was married to 6 elderly husbands, each of whom died within 2 years of marrying Luana and left her as their estates' beneficiary. Insurance investigator Raymond Poindexter believes Luana poisoned them all… and that he may become her 7th victim. Starring: Fred Gwynne, Marian Haley, Robert Dryden
856	95	"The Quadruple"	Himan Brown	Ian Martin	June 28, 1978
A trapeze artist sells his soul for the ability to perform the ultimate stunt. Starring: Michael Tolan
857	96	"The Good Times Express"	Himan Brown	Ian Martin	June 30, 1978
It's strange that a snowstorm in June cancels a salesman's flight to Boston. What's even stranger are the destinations of the alternate means of transportation he's forced to rely on. Starring: Ralph Bell, Roberta Maxwell, Robert Dryden

=== July ===
No. overall	No. in season	Title	Directed by	Written by	Original release date
858	97	"King Bankrobber"	Himan Brown	G. Frederick Lewis	July 3, 1978
A normally law-abiding architect becomes a masterful bankrobber to avenge the justice system's leniency toward the young scoundrel who murdered his parents. Starring: Mason Adams
859	98	"My Kingdom for a Horse"	Himan Brown	Sam Dann	July 5, 1978
The strange tale of a gambler's conversations with his equine companion. Starring: Joe Silver, Mandel Kramer
860	99	"The Four-Fifteen Express"	Himan Brown	Elizabeth Pennell	July 7, 1978
On a train journey, a man meets an ex-acquaintance who reportedly made off with £75,000. The man, at first, is accused of complicity in the theft before being written off as mistaken identity. Starring: William Prince, Ann Williams, Ian Martin, Earl Hammond
861	100	"Sound Advice"	Himan Brown	Victoria Dann	July 10, 1978
An advice columnist feels honor bound to pursue the case of a woman whom she had advised to walk out on her husband… and who was found dead the very next day. Starring: Carol Teitel
862	101	"Guardian Angel"	Himan Brown	Elspeth Eric	July 11, 1978
A rising businessman falls for a young woman who says she's been reincarnated and can talk to animals; when she's committed to an asylum, he tries to relinquish everything to be with her. Starring: John Beal, Jada Rowland
863	102	"The Village of Fools"	Himan Brown	Sam Dann	July 13, 1978
Mendele-Moishe is assigned to find a mysterious village known as "Chelm"; when he does, he is appointed its magistrate… and is assigned with saving the Moon. A farcical tale laced with Yiddishisms and fourth-wall breaks from series host E. G. Marshall. Starring: Fred Gwynne, Robert Dryden, Bryna Raeburn
864	103	"The Hanging Judge"	Himan Brown	G. Frederick Lewis	July 14, 1978
An English shopkeeper has his assistant arrested on accusations of theft. The helper is released due to lack of evidence… and sets down on a chilling revenge spree against both his accuser and the judge who let him free. Starring: Court Benson, Teri Keane, Earl Hammond, William Griffis
865	104	"The Tell-tale Scar"	Himan Brown	Roy Winsor	July 17, 1978
A crime journalist and a district attorney pursue a supposedly deceased mobster. Starring: Tony Roberts, Russell Horton, Ralph Bell, Ray Owens
866	105	"The Absent-Minded League"	Himan Brown	Gerald Keane	July 18, 1978
A Sherlock Holmes-like detective from France is recruited by Scotland Yard to aid in a counterfeiting investigation. Starring: Norman Rose; Adapted from a short story by Robert Barr
867	106	"The Further You Go, the Less You Know"	Himan Brown	Sam Dann	July 20, 1978
A spiritual guru convinces a con artist into believing he's the reincarnation of Leonardo da Vinci and gets him to paint a modern-day Mona Lisa. Starring: Mandel Kramer
868	107	"The Locked Trunk"	Himan Brown	Roy Winsor	July 21, 1978
Two sisters in pre-Revolution Massachusetts pine for the same man; when Perdita marries him, Rosalind seeks revenge… and after she gains it, desires something else Perdita vowed would never be surrendered to her. Starring: Patricia Elliott, Russell Horton; Adapted from Henry James' short story "The Romance of Certain Old Clothes"
869	108	"Close Shave"	Himan Brown	Sam Dann	July 24, 1978
A con artist passes off his blackjack-dealer girlfriend as the queen of a South American country, and dupes a lonely millionaire into marrying the fake empress. Starring: Larry Haines
870	109	"The Stranger Inside"	Himan Brown	Sam Dann	July 25, 1978
With a police investigator's help, an aristocratic woman goes on a voyage of self-discovery (and culpability) after the murder of her stepdaughter. Starring: Ralph Bell, Carol Teitel
871	110	"The Cabinet of the Unsolved"	Himan Brown	G. Frederick Lewis	July 27, 1978
A small-time actor turns deceiver when he sets out to hustle wealthy poker players, only to wind up dead in a railway compartment. In its investigation, Scotland Yard receives a letter detailing the murder from a man involved in the crime. Starring: Robert Dryden, Ray Owens, Lloyd Battista, Robert Kaliban; Adapted from a story by Arthur Conan Doyle
872	111	"Double-Take"	Himan Brown	Percy Granger	July 28, 1978
Without knowing of the other's existence, two women realize they've written the same novel… and are also living its plot. Starring: Marian Seldes, Patricia Elliott
873	112	"The Vanishing Point"	Himan Brown	Sam Dann	July 31, 1978
On a trip to Germany, Dr. William Carstairs searches for an aged physicist who once worked on an antimatter device… and stumbles onto a plot to restore the Nazi regime with what may be just such a weapon. Starring: Fred Gwynne, Bryna Raeburn, Court Benson, Earl Hammond

=== August ===
No. overall	No. in season	Title	Directed by	Written by	Original release date
874	113	"The Devil's Brew"	Himan Brown	Ian Martin	August 2, 1978
The devil lays claim to the soul of a professional baseball player and devout Christian, stating the young man shamed his parents when he embarked on his career. Starring: Russell Horton, Leon Janney, Rosemary Rice, Ian Martin
875	114	"The Avenging Ghost of Kitty Morgan"	Himan Brown	Sam Dann	August 4, 1978
A jilted woman takes her own life and vows to haunt the home she had made for her cheating beloved, haunting its future residents for generations before getting a chance at full-blown revenge. Starring: Mandel Kramer, Evelyn Juster, Bryna Raeburn, Sam Gray
876	115	"The Sixth Commandment"	Himan Brown	Ian Martin	August 7, 1978
A story, told from three different perspectives, of a man coveting his younger brother's wife while they try to co-exist on a failing family farm. Starring: Teri Keane, Ian Martin, Russell Horton, Gilbert Mack
877	116	"The Versegy Case"	Himan Brown	Gerald Keane	August 9, 1978
Police in late-19th century Budapest suspect an unstable college professor of robbing the valuable contents of his own safe in an effort to claim the insurance. Starring: Arnold Moss, William Griffis
878	117	"Doctor Eduardo"	Himan Brown	Gerald Keane	August 11, 1978
Dr. Eduardo Columbo moves to a tiny fishing village and wins over its normally hard-to-please residents… except the mayor's son, who is suspected of murdering Columbo after the doctor had sought to wed the man's sister. Starring: Norman Rose, Betsy Beard, Robert Dryden, Earl Hammond, Lloyd Battista; Adapted from the Arthur Conan Doyle short story "The Black Doctor"
879	118	"The Black Sheep and the Captain"	Himan Brown	G. Frederick Lewis	August 14, 1978
William Hutchens is summoned by his long lost uncle, Arthur, to his house in the desolate moors of northern England. Arthur is seeking protection from an old enemy who had accused the uncle of cheating him. Starring: Jack Grimes, Jackson Beck, Ian Martin, Ray Owens; Adapted from the Arthur Conan Doyle short story "The Winning Shot"
880	119	"Raptures of the Deep"	Himan Brown	Ian Martin	August 16, 1978
A Greek diver searching for a sunken Spanish galleon and its treasure stumbles onto Atlantis, where he learns how the lost kingdom fell into the ocean… and how its inhabitants survived. Starring: Michael Tolan, Catherine Byers, Sam Gray, Ray Owens
881	120	"Our Own Jailer"	Himan Brown	Sam Dann	August 18, 1978
An unhappy capitalist finds himself in a magical commune, where he indulges his passion for painting. Did he commit murder to get there? Starring: John Beal, Robert Kaliban
882	121	"Cross Fire"	Himan Brown	Percy Granger	August 21, 1978
A cabbie gets caught up in murder, intrigue, and thievery when he takes a wealthy man to a burned-out building in South Bronx. Starring: Russell Horton
883	122	"Eavesdropper"	Himan Brown	Elspeth Eric	August 23, 1978
Trapped in a loveless marriage, Myrtle Chapman finds the answers to the questions in her life through a statue in a bar. Starring: Teri Keane
884	123	"The Other Soul"	Himan Brown	Gerald Keane	August 25, 1978
While on a trip to Greece, Dr. Adam Parks receives a card written in Greek from a fainting woman; when he asks others to decipher it, they learn a vile secret they cannot divulge to him. Starring: Russell Horton, Mandel Kramer
885	124	"Will the Real Amy Stand Up?"	Himan Brown	Ian Martin	August 28, 1978
Amy Trowbridge is a young yet mentally unstable heiress in late-1800s Massachusetts who must deal with visiting relatives from Chicago who'll do anything — including murder — to acquire her inheritance. Fortunately for Amy, a voice from her past returns to help her. Starring: Jennifer Harmon, Ray Owens, Ian Martin, Bryna Raeburn
886	125	"The Biggest Fish in the World"	Himan Brown	Sam Dann	August 30, 1978
The story of a man who's accidentally swallowed by a whale at an amusement park, his wife's efforts to rescue him, and an organization of whale lovers who impede the effort. Starring: Joan Shea, Leon Janney

=== September ===
No. overall	No. in season	Title	Directed by	Written by	Original release date
887	126	"Flash Point"	Himan Brown	Gerald Keane	September 1, 1978
Magazine reporter John Roth goes on assignment to a Pennsylvania steel town, begins an affair with the wife of a blast furnace operator, and experiences the worker's jealous wrath while touring the mill… where several other people have had fatal accidents. Starring: Kevin McCarthy, Felicia Farr, Court Benson; Adapted from a story by H. G. Wells
888	127	"Devil's Gold"	Himan Brown	Bob Juhren	September 4, 1978
As reward for turning in a shoplifter at a mysterious antique shop, Rusty West is bestowed a gold coin from the grateful shopkeeper. But try as he may, Rusty discovers he can't get rid of the coin. Starring: Russell Horton, Lloyd Battista, Betsy Beard, Earl Hammond
889	128	"Dead Wrong"	Himan Brown	Ian Martin	September 6, 1978
Newly appointed as a collector of souls for Heaven, Elmer Potts misplaces the invoice for one Peter P. Pell. Instead, he claims the soul of Peter P. Bell. When Elmer realizes his mistake and tries to put things right, Peter Pell states he doesn't want to go just yet. Starring: Jack Grimes, Ralph Bell, Court Benson, Teri Keane
890	129	"Ignorant Armies"	Himan Brown	Sam Dann	September 8, 1978
Walter Patterson is a timid man of few vices, but he gets into trouble for falsehoods he told a young German girl during his time in the American military. He must tell even more dangerous lies to get out of the situation. Starring: Mandel Kramer
891	130	"End of a Memory"	Himan Brown	Gerald Keane	September 11, 1978
A visually-impaired man inadvertently finds himself at a murder scene, narrowly escaping with his life. Years later, he falls in love with a woman who was at that scene, but has no recollection of the incident. Starring: Tony Roberts, John Lithgow, Carol Teitel, Ian Martin; Adapted from a story by Frederick Fergis
892	131	"High Caqueta"	Himan Brown	Percy Granger	September 13, 1978
The mysterious disappearance of their only daughter in a mountain climbing trip in the Andes forces a couple to attempt a search-and-rescue mission. But the escort they've hired seems to know a secret about the mountain that he's not set to divulge. Starring: Marian Seldes, John Beal, Earl Hammond
893	132	"The Secret of Crow's Nest"	Himan Brown	Gerald Keane	September 15, 1978
A man takes a return journey back to a mountain dwelling that holds a horrible surprise for him. Starring: Mandel Kramer, Carol Teitel
894	133	"It's Hard to Be Rich"	Himan Brown	Sam Dann	September 18, 1978
The need to write in peace drives wealthy author Stephen Brooks to rent an inexpensive apartment in a dilapidated building. But newfound tranquility is shattered by the sound of piano music from a previous tenant… who died there a century ago. Starring: Lloyd Battista, Martha Greenhouse, Jada Rowland, William Griffis
895	134	"The Beheading"	Himan Brown	Elspeth Eric	September 20, 1978
Joyce paints a verbal picture of her distressful family history and her frequent asthma attacks. She also talks of meeting a kindly, elderly physician who offers a cure for her maladies — a head transplant. Starring: Teri Keane
896	135	"The Conversion Factor"	Himan Brown	Sam Dann	September 22, 1978
Research scientist Dr. Frederick Lanners needs just one mathematical equation to complete his breakthrough study. The answer apparently resides within the mind of a truck stop waitress who apparently possesses ESP… and who has no interest in assisting Dr. Lanners. Starring: Norman Rose, Jada Rowland
897	136	"A Table for Two"	Himan Brown	Sam Dann	September 25, 1978
Herbie Lister barges into an upscale restaurant and strongly lures the maitre'd, Henri de la Tour, into a blackmail proposition: Be Herbie's lookout while he burglarizes the homes of the cafe's wealthiest customers, or he'll tell the management about Henri's previous life as an ex-con. Starring: Larry Haines, Ann Williams, Court Benson, Catherine Byers
898	137	"The Headhunters"	Himan Brown	Ian Martin	September 27, 1978
On a trip to their native island in the Philippines, newlyweds Tim & Mary Lang are blackmailed by Tim's grandmother, Lola: If Tim acquiesces to beheading Mary's grandfather, Dondoc (who Lola believes killed her husband, Tali), revenge will be gained and Tali's soul will be eased; if not, the life of Mary's unborn baby is at risk. Starring: Tony Roberts, Evelyn Juster, Ian Martin, Mary Jane Higby
899	138	"A Thousand-Year-Old Story"	Himan Brown	Percy Granger	September 29, 1978
The extremely wealthy Sir Dabney mysteriously dies aboard his luxury yacht after entering port in the Mariana Islands, with Dabney's personal secretary, Clive Chubb, branded as the suspect. But an old schoolmate of Chubb's believes otherwise and comes to his defense. Starring: Ralph Bell, Gordon Heath, Carol Teitel

=== October ===
No. overall	No. in season	Title	Directed by	Written by	Original release date
900	139	"The Forever Alley"	Himan Brown	Sam Dann	October 2, 1978
A police detective tries to shame his brother-in-law into paying heed to his family, unaware that the man is about to embark into a metaphysical plane with his true obsession — bowling. Starring: Larry Haines, Robert Kaliban, Marian Seldes, Catherine Byers
901	140	"Shadow of Love"	Himan Brown	James Agate, Jr.	October 4, 1978
A college professor who disdains human affection is haunted by an unseen entity that radiates pure love. He asks a priest for help, but the man's pet parrot unwittingly hinders that plan. Starring: Robert Dryden, Norman Rose; Adapted from a story by Robert Hichens
902	141	"The Captain of the PoleStar"	Himan Brown	Murray Burnett	October 6, 1978
While on a treasure-hunting quest through the North Pole's icy waters, a whaling ship's crew begins to doubt their captain's sanity when they hear strange noises and one-sided conversations coming from his quarters. Starring: Paul Hecht, Court Benson, Earl Hammond, Jane Ives; Adapted from a story by Arthur Conan Doyle
903	142	"The Triple Crown"	Himan Brown	Ian Martin	October 9, 1978
Convinced he's found the next great racing thoroughbred, a poor stable hand purchases a horse and encounters a motley crew of characters in his quest to find the financial backing needed to enter the steed in stakes races. Starring: Jack Grimes
904	143	"The Man in Black"	Himan Brown	Victoria Dann	October 11, 1978
A woman witnesses a murder near Washington's Embassy Row, but the crime's evidence vanishes by the time police arrive, pitching the woman into an international conspiracy. Starring: Kim Hunter
905	144	"How Much Land Does a Man Need?"	Himan Brown	Sam Dann	October 13, 1978
A Native American chief gives a greedy Colonial aristocrat an enticing offer: For just 100 pounds sterling, the nobleman can purchase the entire expanse of land he can travel around in one day. Starring: Paul Hecht, Gordon Heath, Ray Owens, Patricia Elliott; Based on the short story by Leo Tolstoy
906	145	"The Winds of Time"	Himan Brown	Ian Martin	October 16, 1978
Plagued by incessant and debilitating migraines, a woman visits a paranormal expert, who guides her on a journey through time to secure closure for things left unresolved in her past lives. Starring: Carol Teitel, Bryce Bond, Ian Martin, Robert Dryden
907	146	"Never Answer an Advertisement"	Himan Brown	James Agate, Jr.	October 18, 1978
"Wanted: A man of steady nerves and strong physique." Struggling to attract new clientele, a doctor answers a want ad for a physician with expertise in entomology, but soon finds himself captive to a crazed man with strange tastes. Starring: Russell Horton, Evelyn Juster, Court Benson, Joan Beal; Adapted from a short story by Arthur Conan Doyle
908	147	"The Outside Girl"	Himan Brown	--	October 20, 1978
An alcoholic living with his wealthy mother is obsessed with a years-old portrait he painted of his father; when he awakens from a drunken stupor, he discovers that the portrait, and the house's newly-hired cleaning lady, have vanished. Starring: Paul Hecht, Ann Pitoniak, Ralph Bell, Catherine Byers
909	148	"The Lazarus Syndrome"	Himan Brown	Sam Dann	October 23, 1978
Fearing he's now worth less to a company that's been firing older workers without mercy, a fifty-something manager starts acting young and edgy, believing that's the kind of employee the company desires. His change concerns his wife and doctor, who warn him not to overtax his already ailing heart. Starring: Mandel Kramer, Lloyd Battista, Ann Williams, Bryna Raeburn
910	149	"Family Ties"	Himan Brown	Percy Granger	October 25, 1978
A woman's husband disappears after he receives a strange phone call; her search for him reveals his peculiar and mysterious familial relations. Starring: Teri Keane, Russell Horton, Ray Owens
911	150	"The Sound of Terror"	Himan Brown	Ian Martin	October 27, 1978
A police detective's girlfriend answers a ringing pay phone and finds herself involved with a terrorist kidnapping of a diplomat. Starring: Patricia Elliott

=== November ===
No. overall	No. in season	Title	Directed by	Written by	Original release date
912	151	"The Midas of Castle Hill"	Himan Brown	James Agate, Jr.	November 1, 1978
A rich patriarch hides the family fortune in his castle; his son hires famed French detective Eugène Valmont to help him discover its whereabouts, in the belief that doing so will gain his disappointed father's approval. Starring: Norman Rose, Russell Horton, Robert Dryden; Adapted from a story by Robert Barr
913	152	"The Man with the Claret Mark"	Himan Brown	Ian Martin	November 3, 1978
An Irish family's matron warns her younger relatives of a familial curse: Each of them will be haunted by a man who bears a claret-colored birthmark on his face. Starring: Teri Keane; Adapted from a story by Joseph Sheridan Le Fanu
914	153	"Hit and Run"	Himan Brown	Sam Dann	November 6, 1978
A professional accident victim unexpectedly dies when he jumps out in front of a car. His hired witness soon blackmails the senator riding that car after he flees the scene. Starring: Ann Williams, Ralph Bell, Court Benson, Earl Hammond
915	154	"Second Sight"	Himan Brown	James Agate, Jr.	November 8, 1978
A pilot is grounded after claiming he sees things in the sky that others cannot. When a psychiatrist recommends he take up painting as a means of relaxation, the pilot obliges… but the pictures he creates foretell of death and destruction that occur the next day. Starring: Michael Tolan
916	155	"A Better Mousetrap"	Himan Brown	Ian Martin	November 10, 1978
After she discovers his infidelity, a man kills his wealthy wife, then stages his own kidnapping in order to secure an air-tight alibi. Starring: John Beal, Joan Lovejoy, Ian Martin, Bryna Raeburn
917	156	"The Pilgrim Soul"	Himan Brown	Percy Granger	November 13, 1978
An American nurse travels to England to assist at a hospital during World War II. Her charming nature allows the patients to open up to her… and causes British Intelligence to suspect her as a Nazi spy. But a morally wounded officer she had fallen for proves to be her savior. Starring: Carol Teitel, Gordon Heath, Bryna Raeburn, Gordon Gould
918	157	"The Conspiracy"	Himan Brown	Elspeth Eric	November 15, 1978
A vengeful model conspires to embarrass the first photographer — and first love — who abandoned her. Starring: Teri Keane
919	158	"The Favor of Women"	Himan Brown	Sam Dann	November 17, 1978
In the year 3039, a resource-depleted Earth runs out of a vital energy source from another planet. An astronaut is dispatched to convince the planet's queen to resume shipments (after she cut them off), but he soon finds that Earth may not be the only one in need. Starring: Lloyd Battista, Evelyn Juster, Ray Owens, William Griffis
920	159	"The Thing at Nolan"	Himan Brown	Arnold Moss	November 20, 1978
In 1879 Missouri, a rebellious young man is suspected in the disappearance of his domineering father; the young man's mother is the only one who believes in his innocence. Starring: Russell Horton, Court Benson, Bryna Raeburn, Arnold Moss; Adapted from a story by Ambrose Bierce
921	160	"The Grey Slapper"	Himan Brown	Sam Dann	November 22, 1978
A woman tries to save the life of her former college professor from someone who's disappointed in the corrupt politician he has become. That someone, she insists, is the professor's younger self. Starring: Carol Teitel, Gordon Heath
922	161	"Night Visitor"	Himan Brown	Elspeth Eric	November 24, 1978
A supposedly dead young woman shows up in the bed of her parents' visitor. Scandal ensues. Starring: Teri Keane
923	162	"Alien Presences"	Himan Brown	Ian Martin	November 27, 1978
An elderly couple witness a UFO crash and discover a baby onboard the wreckage; the couple raise the infant as an earthling, but the lad eventually longs to return to his own planet and people. Starring: John Beal, Joan Shea, John Lithgow, Ian Martin
924	163	"The Romany Revenge"	Himan Brown	James Agate, Jr.	November 29, 1978
A quartet of heirs to a $2 million diamond fortune start disappearing; only a band of gypsies residing in the area can provide a detective with answers to the case. Starring: Earl Hammond, Court Benson, Bryna Raeburn; Adapted from a story by T. L. Neuger

=== December ===
No. overall	No. in season	Title	Directed by	Written by	Original release date
925	164	"Squaring the Triangle"	Himan Brown	Sam Dann	December 1, 1978
A CEO finds himself stranded at a remote airport along with the wife of one of his employees, a woman he falls head over heels for… and whose husband he later sends on a dangerous assignment in the hopes he will be killed. Starring: Felicia Farr, Ian Martin
926	165	"The Serpent of Saris"	Himan Brown	Sam Dann	December 4, 1978
A retired cop steps in to help save a boxer's life from the god of athletics, Saris, who has already administered fatal punishment on another pugilist. Starring: Fred Gwynne, Russell Horton, Evelyn Juster, Ray Owens
927	166	"The Devil's Bargain"	Himan Brown	James Agate, Jr.	December 6, 1978
A con artist steals valuable items, then poses as a psychic in an effort to find the goods for a fee. However, he may meet his comeuppance via an equally elaborate scheme. Starring: Robert Dryden, Joan Shay, Gordon Heath, Jackson Beck; Adapted from a story by Guy Boothby
928	167	"The Exploding Heart"	Himan Brown	Ian Martin	December 8, 1978
Dr. Matt Bard must tell his future brother-in-law that he needs a risky heart operation. But the hospital's chief surgeon overrules him out of fear that the patient's father — the hospital's biggest benefactor — will pull his funding if the procedure were to fail. Starring: Bob Kaliban, Gordon Gould, Evelyn Juster, Ian Martin
929	168	"A Horror Story"	Himan Brown	Elspeth Eric	December 11, 1978
How do a gourmet chef and a shoemaker make the finest cuisine and footwear around? The secret is in how the ingredients are obtained. Starring: Robert Dryden
930	169	"Ward Six"	Himan Brown	Percy Granger	December 13, 1978
Dr. Andrei Yefimych is assigned to a dilapidated hospital in the Russian heartland, and is upset most by the state of its mental ward and the well-being of its residents, in particular the one man with whom Dr. Yefimych can carry on an intelligent conversation. Starring: Norman Rose, Eugene Troobnick, Earl Hammond, Russell Horton, Bryna Raeburn; Adapted from the Anton Chekhov short story "Ward Number Six"
931	170	"The Search for Myra"	Himan Brown	Sam Dann	December 15, 1978
Wealthy industrialist George Hastings inexplicably starts calling his secretary and his wife "Myra." The former doesn't mind, but the latter demands George see a psychiatrist. When he does, memories of an old flame resurface from his subconscious. Starring: Mandel Kramer, Marian Seldes, Court Benson, Carol Teitel
932	171	"The Familiar Ghost"	Himan Brown	Ian Martin	December 18, 1978
On the verge of marriage, retired British Navy captain James Barton becomes paranoid when he is pursued by footsteps only he can hear. A psychic detective advises Barton that he must determine his pursuer's identity before his wedding takes place. Starring: Gordon Heath, Charles Irving, Teri Keane, Ian Martin
933	172	"It Has to Be True"	Himan Brown	Sam Dann	December 20, 1978
On his way to Chicago, a traveling salesman is arrested and imprisoned for a woman's death. The evidence against him is overwhelmingly incriminating… but he has no recollection of ever meeting her. Starring: John Beal
934	173	"The Power of Evil"	Himan Brown	James Agate, Jr.	December 22, 1978
Deep in debt from gambling losses, an employee of the U.S. consulate in Hong Kong is approached by a mysterious woman who lends him cash and tips on winning at the roulette wheel. When the man starts winning big, the woman demands more than just love. Starring: Lloyd Battista, Evelyn Juster
935	174	"If I Can't Have You"	Himan Brown	Sam Dann	December 25, 1978
Agents of "the people's government" keep two classical musical rivals in check as the men compete for the romantic affections of the woman who completes their trio. Starring: Bob Kaliban, Russell Horton, Anne Williams, Carol Teitel
936	175	"No Way Out"	Himan Brown	Elspeth Eric	December 27, 1978
An elderly man becomes obsessed with the number 12172 when it repeatedly appears in random patterns during the course of his life. Starring: Earl Hammond, Charles Irving, Roberta Maxwell
937	176	"The Dead House"	Himan Brown	Ian Martin	December 29, 1978
In an adaptation of a Mark Twain story (from Life on the Mississippi), the famous writer, while traveling in Germany, listens to a morgue caretaker's tale of a man who exacted revenge on those who killed his family. Starring: Robert Dryden (as Twain), Leon Janney, Ian Martin, Bryna Raeburn

== Sources ==
- Payton, Gordon; Grams, Martin Jr. (January 1999), The CBS radio mystery theater: an episode guide and handbook to nine years of broadcasting, 1974-1982, McFarland & Company, Inc., ISBN 0-7864-0559-7
