= CBS Radio Mystery Theater =

American radio program, 1974–1982

- Approximation of CBSRMT logo
- Other names: Mystery Theater
- Genre: Radio drama
- Running time: 45 minutes
- Country of origin: United States
- Language: English
- Home station: WOR (AM)
- Hosted by: E. G. Marshall (1974–82); Tammy Grimes (1982)
- Created by: Himan Brown
- Written by: Sam Dann, Ian Martin, Elspeth Eric, Bob Juhren, Henry Slesar, Alfred Bester
- Directed by: Himan Brown
- Produced by: Himan Brown
- Original release: January 6, 1974 – December 31, 1982
- No. of episodes: 1,399
- Audio format: Monaural sound

CBS Radio Mystery Theater (a.k.a. Radio Mystery Theater and Mystery Theater, sometimes abbreviated as CBSRMT) is a radio drama series created by Himan Brown that was broadcast on CBS Radio Network affiliates from 1974 to 1982, and later in the early 2000s was repeated by the NPR satellite feed. In New York City it was not aired by the then all-news WCBS but by its originating station, WOR, which produced and announced it as simply Radio Mystery Theater.

The format was similar to that of classic old time radio shows like The Mysterious Traveler and The Whistler, in that the episodes were introduced by host E. G. Marshall who provided pithy wisdom and commentary throughout. Unlike the hosts of those earlier programs, Marshall is fully mortal, merely someone whose heightened insight and erudition plunge the listener into the world of the macabre.

As with Himan Brown's prior Inner Sanctum Mystery, each episode of CBS Radio Mystery Theater opened and closed with the ominous sound of a creaking door. This sound effect is accompanied by Marshall's greeting, "Come in!… Welcome. I'm E. G. Marshall." At each show's conclusion, the door swings shut, and Marshall signs off with: "Until next time, pleasant… dreams?" This is followed by an extended variation of the show's theme music.

CBSRMT was broadcast each weeknight, at first with a new program each night. Later in the run, three or four episodes were new originals each week, and the remainder repeats. There were 1,399 original episodes. The total number of broadcasts, including repeats, was 2,969. Each episode was allotted a full hour of airtime, but after commercials and newscasts, a typical episode ran for approximately 45 minutes.

== Hosts ==
E. G. Marshall hosted the program from January 1974 until February 1, 1982, when actress Tammy Grimes took over for the remainder of the series' final season, maintaining the format. Himan Brown re-recorded E. G. Marshall's original host segments for NPR's broadcast of the show in the 2000s.

== Music ==
The series' theme music features three descending notes from double basses, a stopped horn sting and timpani roll, then a low, eerie theme played by the bass clarinet. The opening and closing themes for CBSRMT are excerpted from the music from the score for Twilight Zone episode "Two", composed by Nathan Van Cleave. Series listeners will immediately recognize the "RMT Theme" beginning about 1:35 on the "Two" soundtrack selection from the Twilight Zone CD boxed set. Other background tracks from the Twilight Zone music library, to which CBS owned full rights, were featured repeatedly in episodes of CBSRMT. The theme song and the other music was also previously used in the 1950s and 1960s in other CBS-owned radio and television dramas (Perry Mason; Rawhide; The Fugitive; Gunsmoke; Have Gun Will Travel; Suspense; Yours Truly, Johnny Dollar; etc.), in addition to Twilight Zone, as it was all owned by CBS.

== Scope ==
Despite the show's title, Brown expanded its scope beyond mysteries to include horror, science fiction, historical drama, westerns and comedy, along with seasonal dramas during the Christmas season: An adaptation of A Christmas Carol, starring host E.G. Marshall as Scrooge, was broadcast every Christmas Eve with the exception of 1974 (which has a different Christmas special) and 1982.

In addition to original stories, there were adaptations of classic tales by such writers as O. Henry, Ambrose Bierce, Algernon Blackwood, Wilkie Collins, Arthur Conan Doyle, Charles Dickens, H. Rider Haggard, Henry James, Guy de Maupassant, Edith Wharton, Oscar Wilde and others. Brown typically devoted the first full week of each January to a five- or seven-part series on a common theme. These included a full week of stories by an American writer, (Edgar Allan Poe in 1975, Mark Twain in 1976); week-long adaptations of classic novels (The Last Days of Pompeii in 1980, Les Misérables in 1982); and original dramas about historical figures (Nefertiti in 1979, Alexander the Great in 1981). The works of Russian writers, including Gogol, Dostoevsky and Tolstoy, were also adapted.

== Criticism ==
Radio historian John Dunning has criticized the quality of the show's script writing, arguing that Brown used writers for many scripts "who were by their nature performers" rather than writers.

== Notable performers ==
Prominent actors from the stage, radio, film and television performed on the series. Notable regulars included Mason Adams, Lloyd Battista, John Beal, Robert Dryden, Teri Keane, Ralph Bell, Howard Da Silva, Keir Dullea, Patricia Elliot, Morgan Fairchild, Bernard Grant, Veleka Gray, Jack Grimes, Fred Gwynne, Marian Hailey, Larry Haines, Paul Hecht, Celeste Holm, Russell Horton, Kim Hunter, Richard Kiley, Beatrice Straight, John Lithgow, Roberta Maxwell, Mercedes McCambridge, Kevin McCarthy, Arnold Moss, William Redfield, Tony Roberts, Norman Rose, Alexander Scourby, Marian Seldes, Kristoffer Tabori and Michael Tolan.

The series introduced a new generation of listeners to many of the voices from radio's golden age, including Agnes Moorehead, Joan Banks, Jackson Beck, Virginia Gregg, Victor Jory, Lon Clark, Mandel Kramer, Marvin Miller, Dan Ocko, Santos Ortega, Alan Reed, Rosemary Rice, Anne Seymour, Arnold Stang, Les Tremayne, Lurene Tuttle and Janet Waldo.

A number of well-known veteran and future stars of stage, film and TV made appearances, including:

- Diane Baker ("Picture on a Wall," October 15, 1974; "The Little Old Lady Killer," September 15, 1975))
- Theodore Bikel ("Just One More Day," May 29, 1975)
- Joseph Campanella ("Murder to Perfection," September 30, 1974)
- Len Cariou ("The Man of Two Centuries," April 29, 1981; "The Headhunters," May 22, 1981)
- Ralph Carter ("Accounts Receivable", January 16, 1974)
- Hans Conried
- Richard Crenna ("Ghost Plane," September 12, 1975)
- Ruby Dee
- Sandy Dennis ("Snake in the Grass," July 14, 1975)
- Nina Foch
- John Forsythe ("The Golden Blood of the Sun," October 3, 1974)
- Vincent Gardenia
- Jack Gilford ("It's Simply Murder," March 27, 1974)
- Joan Hackett ("Mother Love," January 30, 1974; "The Eye of Death," March 7, 1975)
- Margaret Hamilton ("Triptych for a Witch," October 30, 1975)
- Mariette Hartley
- Casey Kasem ("The Headless Hessian," September 23, 1975)
- John Lithgow ("The Deserter," February 6, 1980)
- Anne Meara ("The Killer Inside," April 1, 1975)
- Agnes Moorehead ("The Old Ones Are Hard to Kill" (January 6, 1974; "The Ring of Truth," January 26, 1974)
- Julie Newmar ("Ordeal by Fire," March 21, 1974)
- Patrick O'Neal
- Jerry Orbach ("The Follower," January 25, 1975)
- Sarah Jessica Parker ("The Child Cat's Paw", May 17, 1977)
- Mandy Patinkin ("Lost Dog," January 9, 1974)
- Brock Peters ("The Black Whale," September 25, 1975)
- Kathleen Quinlan ("Ring of Evil," April 16, 1979)
- Stephan Schnabel
- Frances Sternhagen
- Jerry Stiller ("The Frontiers of Fear," August 13, 1974)
- Holland Taylor
- Roy Thinnes ("Journey Into Terror," August 14, 1974)
- Ruth Warrick ("Conspiracy to Defraud," February 8, 1974)

When the program began in 1974, actors were paid union scale; at the time around $73.92 per episode. Writers earned a flat rate of $350 per episode. Production took place with assembly-line precision. Brown met with actors at 9:00 a.m. for the first script reading. After roles were assigned, recording began. By noon, the recording of the actors was complete, and Brown handed everyone checks. The program was taped in New York at the CBS Studio Building, 49 East 52nd Street in Studio G, formerly Studio 27 (renamed Studio 'G' in honor of Arthur Godfrey whose programs originated in the building for decades).

== Episodes ==
Below is a list of the number of first-run episodes broadcast on each of the nine seasons of the series, with links to a list of each season's episodes.

Episode list	# of episodes
List of CBS Radio Mystery Theater episodes (1974 season)	193
List of CBS Radio Mystery Theater episodes (1975 season)	212
List of CBS Radio Mystery Theater episodes (1976 season)	170
List of CBS Radio Mystery Theater episodes (1977 season)	186
List of CBS Radio Mystery Theater episodes (1978 season)	176
List of CBS Radio Mystery Theater episodes (1979 season)	106
List of CBS Radio Mystery Theater episodes (1980 season)	97
List of CBS Radio Mystery Theater episodes (1981 season)	132
List of CBS Radio Mystery Theater episodes (1982 season)	127

== Awards ==
In 1974, CBSRMT won a Peabody Award, and in 1990 it was inducted into the National Radio Hall of Fame. On May 6, 1979, Himan Brown was presented a Broadcast Preceptor Award by San Francisco State University for his contributions with the CBSRMT.

== Continuing popularity ==
From June 3 to November 27, 1998, CBSRMT was rebroadcast over CBS radio affiliates and, in 2000, on some NPR stations, in both cases, Himan Brown re-recorded the original introduction and narrations of E. G. Marshall and Tammy Grimes.

CBSRMT remains popular with listeners of audio drama, with numerous websites and podcasts devoted to the series. All episodes are available, and many recordings include original network and local news and commercials, providing insights into the period in which the episodes were broadcast.

== Related publications ==
The episode "Children of Death", broadcast February 5, 1976, written by Sam Dann, served as the basis for Dann's 1979 novel The Third Body, published by Popular Library. Another of his stories for Mystery Theater, "Goodbye, Karl Erich" from the 1975 season, was also turned into a novel by the same name, first published in 1985.

In 1976, a paperback anthology with three short stories adapted from the series' radio scripts was published by Pocket Library, Strange Tales from the CBS Radio Mystery Theater, edited and with a foreword by Himan Brown.

In January 1999, McFarland & Company, Inc. published The CBS Radio Mystery Theater: An Episode Guide and Handbook to Nine Years of Broadcasting. 1974–1982. The book, by Gordon Payton and Martin Grams, Jr., includes a brief history of the program and an episode guide. A partial list of errors in this guide is maintained on The Long Trek website.

In October 2006, Michael Anthony Stahl published The CBS Radio Mystery Theater As An Educational Degree. And also a journal article illustrating the series's educational benefits entitled "Drama as an aid in Academic Learning and Creative Writing: The CBS Radio Mystery Theater" in the October 2024 issue of the International Journal of Innovative Science and Research Technology.

== See also ==
- The Zero Hour, a weekday anthology radio series from 1973–74, created and hosted by Rod Serling over syndication and the Mutual Broadcasting System
- Sears Radio Theater/Mutual Radio Theater, an hour-long weekday anthology series on CBS Radio which followed CBSRMT during much of its run before moving to the Mutual Broadcasting System.
- Mollé Mystery Theatre, a 30-minute anthology radio program (1943—1948) on NBC, later, CBS
