= Sidney Slon =

American radio and television writer and actor

Sidney Slon (May 27, 1910, in Chicago - January 21, 1995) was an American radio and TV writer and actor. He contributed greatly to early radio and television as the head writer for the famous radio shows The Shadow and Dick Tracy; as an actor playing the doctor in "The Goldberg's," also a radio show; and as a producer of many hit TV series in the 1950s and '60s.

== Family and early life ==
Sidney's father, originally named Samuel Slonimsky, emigrated to the United States from Russia around 1885 and found work handing glasses of water to theater patrons for tips. He was eight years old upon arrival, and this is how he learned English. Several years later, he became a salesman in a large furniture store in Chicago, which had just installed a speaker and microphone to summon salesmen to the desk. The manager asked Samuel Slonimsky if he would change his last name because, he said, it sounded too ethnic over the loud speaker. Samuel complied, shortening it to Slon.

About five years later, Sidney was born. When Sidney was 12, in 1922, he won a citywide award for designing a model airplane and flying it in a civic auditorium. Sponsored by a local Chicago newspaper, the prize was a ride in a biplane to Ohio. A reporter from the paper was a fellow passenger. But the plane crashed after take-off, unable to gain altitude with the weight onboard. No one was killed, but the pilot was knocked unconscious. Though shaken up, Sidney was otherwise unharmed. The story hit the front page of a local newspaper, and the following week, the paper asked whether Sidney would be willing to try again—his mother, Mabel Finklestein, said no. Sidney later attended Northwestern University as a pre-med student around 1929, though he dropped out after two years to join the Goodman Theater. After completing its training program, he and fellow actor, Barry Kelley, who later starred in the movie "Asphalt Jungle," moved to New York together, hoping to land Broadway roles. But, with the Great Depression in full swing, it proved impossible to eke out a living in the theater business. So, the two men ultimately returned home to Chicago despondent.

== Introduction to radio ==
A relatively new radio station, WLW, had started up in Cincinnati, Ohio, a strategic location amid Eastern, Southern, and Midwestern states. This powerful 500,000-watt station was hiring actors for live radio dramas, an emerging market. With his Goodman Theater training, his ability to play multiple characters with different accents, and his sight-reading skills, Slon was hired right away. Several months into his employment, WLW introduced a popular new show, The Shadow. The producer asked Slon what he thought of it. He replied that the idea seemed okay for radio, but he didn't like the script he had seen. The producer challenged him to create a better one, which he did. The producer loved it, and Slon advanced from head writer to sole writer for this new venture, soon to become the nation's most popular radio show.

Slon continued radio acting, show announcing, and writing. His salary in the mid-1930s was $400 a week, enough to buy a brand new Chevrolet.

He played Mr. Trent in the Valiant Lady radio soap opera . He also took on other roles in Valiant Lady and Bright Horizon.

== World War II ==
Slon moved to New York, where he wrote for CBS and NBC radio shows in the late 1930s. As part of the war effort, he was enlisted to work in the broadcast division of the United States Office of War Information. There, under the direction of John Houseman, he produced programs that aired in many languages for overseas markets. This work eventually evolved into 'The Voice of America.'

Meanwhile, he met Jean MacInnis, they fell in love, and were married in 1947.

== Television ==
After the war, he returned to NBC, becoming executive producer for the show Big Town. Television production was then done in a studio, but this aspect of the show soon moved to the West Coast, where large programs could be shot year-round outdoors. Sidney's schedule became extremely hectic during this period, as a cross-country airplane trip took 12 hours, and he was required to shuttle back and forth between New York and Los Angeles every two weeks. When the show's sponsor, the huge agency Ruth, Roth, and Rhine, dissolved, Sidney had a major decision to make, and chose to remain in New York, rather than relocate to LA, as many of his fellow writers and producers were doing.

In 1961, he was the writer and producer for the ABC special, "Invitation to Paris," shot on location in France. He wrote himself into the movie as a befuddled American tourist, a bit part.

== Theater producing in the 1970s ==
A friend of Sidney's, Hal James, convinced him to invest in a new production, called "Man of La Mancha." Though weary and unconvinced by the script's sentimentality, Sidney took the plunge, and was handsomely rewarded when the show became a huge hit.

== Family life ==
Sidney and Jean Slon had three children together: Steve, editor of AARP Magazine from 1998 to 2008; Jonathan, a film maker; and Allison Slon, a graphic designer. His daughters from a previous marriage were Shannon Simon and Terry Heekin. Sidney's eight grandchildren were Matt and Mathew Heekin, Jason and Jenny Simon, and Shawn Slon, Sidney Charles Slon, Maeve Elizabeth Slon, and Nigel Reid Slon. He got to meet all his grandchildren, except the last three, who were born after his death, in 1995.
