= Marian Hailey-Moss =

American actress (born 1941)

- Born: February 1, 1941 (age 85); Portland, Oregon, U.S.
- Education: University of Washington (BA)
- Occupations: Actress, author
- Spouse: John Thackray (m. 1965)
- Website: www.marianhaileymoss.weebly.com

Marian Hailey-Moss (born February 1, 1941) is an American actress, author, and humanitarian.

== Biography ==
Hailey-Moss was born on February 1, 1941, in Portland, Oregon. She has a BA degree in drama from the University of Washington. She began her acting career in the early 1960s with performances in Shakespearean festivals. She moved to New York City a few years later where she was cast in a series of Broadway plays, avant-garde productions, and motion pictures. She played the critically acclaimed role of Brenda in the 1970 film Lovers and Other Strangers.

Broadway plays in which Hailey-Moss performed included Mating Dance (1965), The Best Laid Plans (1966), Keep It in the Family (1967), Harvey (1970), Company (1970), The Castro Complex (1970), and The Women (1973).

Hailey-Moss married author John Thackray in March 1965.

== Partial filmography ==
- Jenny (1970) - Kay
- Lovers and Other Strangers (1970) - Brenda
- Harvey (1972) - Myrtle Mae Simmons
- Why We Need Reading (1975) - Narrator
- The Seduction of Joe Tynan (1979) - Sheila Lerner
- The Survivors (1983) - Jack's Wife
- Random House Beginner Book Video (1989-1991) Narration and Additional Voices

== Bibliography ==
- Hailey-Moss, Marian; Wilk, Mark (2012). A Dog Named Randall. CreateSpace Independent Publishing. ISBN 978-1470175610.
- Hailey-Moss, Marian; End, Andrea (2012). A Palace for Peepers. Illustrated by Marc Chalvin. CreateSpace Independent Publishing. ISBN 978-1475087703.
- Hailey-Moss, Marian (2013). Dreams Need Feet to Walk On. CreateSpace Independent Publishing. ISBN 978-1479355976.
- Hailey-Moss, Marian (2013). A Flower in my Chest. CreateSpace Independent Publishing. ISBN 978-1479197552.
- Hailey-Moss, Marian (2013). Teatime with Sophie. Illustrated by Marc Chalvin. CreateSpace Independent Publishing. ISBN 978-1481953634.
- Hailey-Moss, Marian (2013). Milky Whey's Dream. CreateSpace Independent Publishing. ISBN 978-1492201564.
- Hailey-Moss, Marian (2014). The Chicken in Apartment 15L. Illustrated by Marc Chalvin. CreateSpace Independent Publishing. ISBN 978-1494298326.
- Hailey-Moss, Marian; Meredith, Lois (2014). An Elephant Called Butterfly. CreateSpace Independent Publishing. ASIN B00V1DEHWM.
- Hailey-Moss, Marian (2014). Mister Pepper's Secret. CreateSpace Independent Publishing. ISBN 978-1499690958.
