= Alias Jimmy Valentine =

Alias Jimmy Valentine may refer to:

- Alias Jimmy Valentine (play), a 1909 play by Paul Armstrong, based on the O. Henry short story, "A Retrieved Reformation"
  - Alias Jimmy Valentine (1915 film), an American silent film directed by Maurice Tourneur, based on the play
  - Alias Jimmy Valentine (1920 film), an American silent film directed by Edmund Mortimer and Arthur Ripley, based on the play
  - Alias Jimmy Valentine (1928 film), an American film directed by Jack Conway, based on the play
  - Alias Jimmy Valentine (radio program), an American radio broadcast 1938–1939, based on the play

== See also ==
- The Affairs of Jimmy Valentine, a 1942 American film directed by Bernard Vorhaus, based on the play by Paul Armstrong
