= Jimmy Valentine =

Jimmy Valentine may refer to:

- Alias Jimmy Valentine, a 1910 play by Paul Armstrong, based on the O. Henry short story, "A Retrieved Reformation"
  - Alias Jimmy Valentine (1915 film), a 1915 American silent crime film directed by Maurice Tourneur, based on the play
  - Alias Jimmy Valentine (1920 film), a 1920 American silent film crime drama directed by Edmund Mortimer and Arthur Ripley, based on the play
  - Alias Jimmy Valentine (1928 film), a 1928 American crime drama film directed by Jack Conway, based on the play
  - Alias Jimmy Valentine (radio program), an American radio crime drama broadcast in 1938 - 1939, based on the play

== See also ==
- The Affairs of Jimmy Valentine, a 1942 American comedy crime film directed by Bernard Vorhaus, based on the play by Paul Armstrong
