= Alias Jimmy Valentine (play) =

1909 play by Paul Armstrong

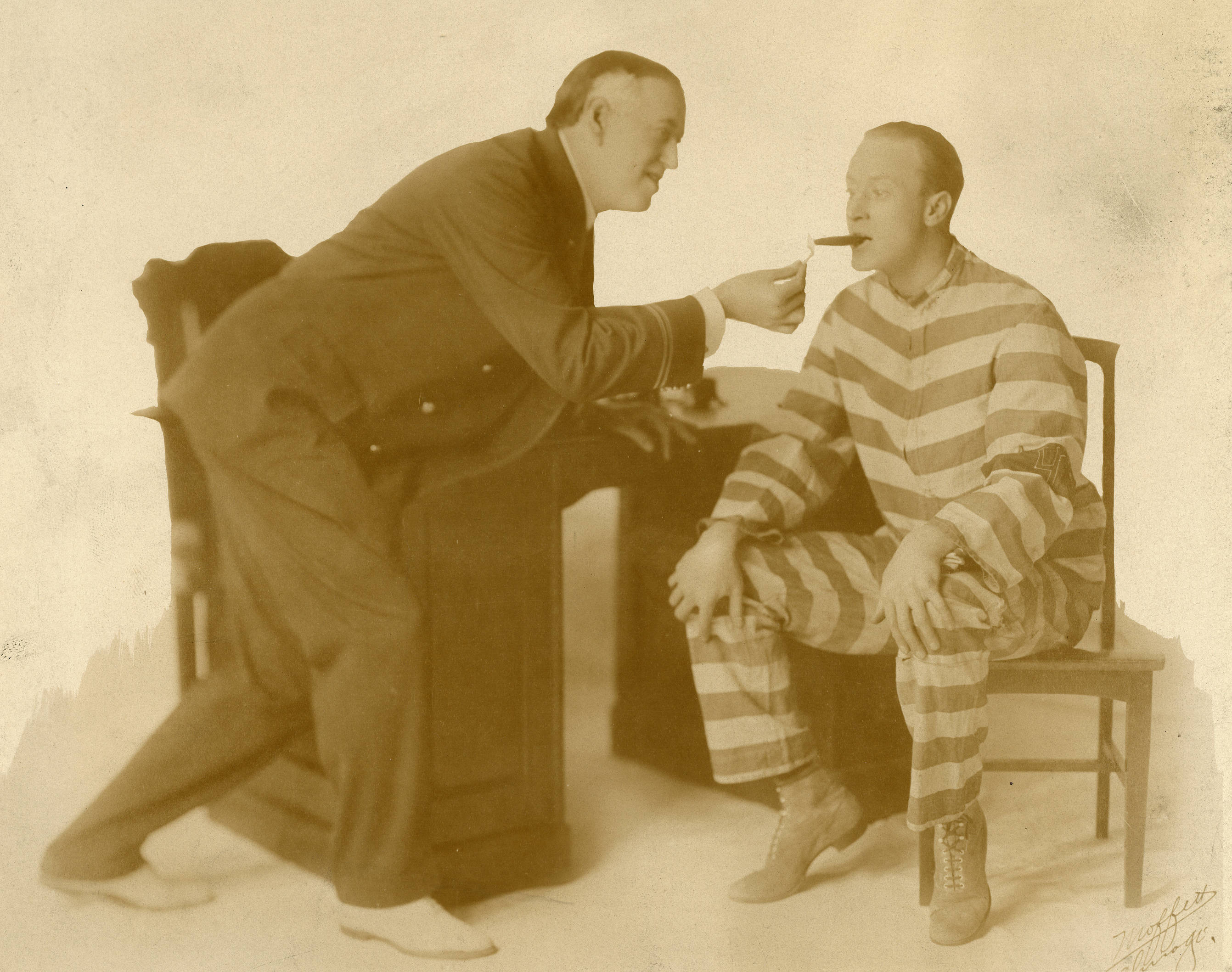
- Harold Hartsell and H. B. Warner in Alias Jimmy Valentine (1910)
- Original language: English
- Written by: Paul Armstrong
- Based on: A Retrieved Reformation by O. Henry (1903)
- Subject: Safecracker goes straight
- Genre: Melodrama
- Setting: Sing Sing, an Albany hotel, a Springfield bank

Premiere
- Date: January 21, 1910
- Place: Wallack's Theatre
- Directed by: Hugh Ford

Alias Jimmy Valentine is a 1909 play written by Paul Armstrong, based on the 1903 short story A Retrieved Reformation by O. Henry. It has four acts, a large cast, four settings, and fast pacing. The story follows a former safecracker's attempt to go straight, and the choice he must make between saving a child's life and exposing himself to arrest.

The play was produced by Liebler & Company, staged by Hugh Ford, with settings from Gates and Morange. The play starred H. B. Warner and introduced Laurette Taylor. It opened Christmas night 1909 in Chicago, moving to Broadway during January 1910 where it played through June 1910.

Alias Jimmy Valentine had a brief Broadway revival during December 1921, was adapted for motion pictures in 1915, 1920, 1928, 1936 and 1942, and was turned into a radio program during 1938–1939.

== Characters ==
Lead

- Rose Lane is a young woman once saved from crooks by Valentine.
- Lee Randall alias Jimmy Valentine is a former safecracker trying to go straight.

Supporting

- Handler is the bullying warden at Sing Sing prison.
- Robert Fay is Lt. Governor of New York state and uncle to Rose.
- Doyle is a police detective from Springfield, Massachusetts on the trail of Randall.
- Bill Avery is an old convict from Sing Sing, who was freed before Randall.
- William Lane is Rose's father and president of the Fourth National Bank in Springfield, Illinois.
- Red Joclyn is a reformed "yegg" (safecracker), whom Randall takes with him to Springfield.

Featured

- Blickendolfenbach is a German inventor who has created a new keyed lock.
- Blinky Davis is a forger and prisoner at Sing-Sing.
- Dick the Rat is a sneak thief and lockpick, also a prisoner at Sing-Sing.
- Mrs. Moore is a member of the Gate of Hope Society, advocate of prison reform.
- Mrs. Webster is another member of the Gate of Hope Society.
- Bobby Lane is Rose's teenage brother, who is prone to mischief.
- Kitty Lane is about 8, Rose's little sister, who becomes well-acquainted with the bank vault.

Bit Players

- Smith is the Warden's assistant at Sing Sing.
- Williams is a clerk in the Fourth National Bank

== Synopsis ==
The following was compiled from a large extract of the play published in Current Literature during 1910, and from newspaper reviews of 1909–1910.

Act I (The Warden's office at Sing Sing prison.) Rose Lane and two women from the Gate of Hope Society are visiting the Warden. Rose has brought along her mom's brother, Robert Fay. The four of them are discussing prison reform and criminal types with the Warden. Also present is Blickendolfenbach, with his new keyed lock that he hopes to sell to the state prison. Smith fetches Blinky Davis, who casually alters a $5.00 check into $50,000. Then Smith brings in Dick the Rat, who picks the new lock with just a hairpin. Smith, the prisoners and the inventor depart. The women ask the Warden about other convict types, and he promises to show them a romantic one. While he's gone, Rose tells the others about how a criminal tried to molest her on a train two years ago, but was thwarted by a young stranger. The Warden returns with Jimmy Valentine. Rose instantly recognizes him as the young stranger. Valentine enrages the Warden by refusing to pick the combination lock of the prison safe, claiming he has no knowledge of safecracking. Fay intervenes when the Warden berates Valentine, and urges the latter to apply for a pardon. (Curtain)

Act II (Hotel parlor in Albany, New York, a few weeks later.) Valentine has been pardoned and released. He is due to meet Rose and her father at the hotel. While waiting, he is approached by old friends Bill Avery and Red Joclyn, fellow yeggs. They urge Valentine to resume his old profession, but he has fallen in love with Rose and repudiates crime. Suddenly Detective Doyle is spotted. Red and Bill hide, while Valentine verbally spars with Doyle, who wants him to sell out Bill Avery. Valentine refuses, and Doyle threatens to prosecute him over a safecracking in Springfield, Massachusetts. He leaves frustrated by Valentine's aplomb. Bill and Red reappear, and Valentine hands Bill a message from Rose, promising him a job out west. Bill thanks Valentine and departs promising to go straight. Rose and her father now appear. William Lane offers Valentine a position in his bank. Valentine allows himself to be persuaded, and reveals his real name, Lee Randall. When they leave, he tells Red to follow him to Illinois, where he'll get him an honest job. (Curtain)

Act III (Randall's office at Fourth National Bank of Springfield, three years later.) Randall is now Assistant Cashier of Lane's bank, while Red Joclyn has been appointed a watchman. Randall's clerk Williams brings in a man called Cronin, who is actually Bill Avery. He is now prosperous through marriage, and brings a "doctored" photo for Randall to alibi himself for the Massachusetts safecracking. They both know Doyle is in town. After he leaves, Rose visits Randall with her younger siblings, Bobby and Kitty. Rose and Valentine are close to being engaged. Rose goes to her father's office, while the kids leave to inspect the newly installed bank vault. Doyle now enters, and begins to question Valentine, who stymies him by claiming to be Lee Randall. (Note: Randall was named after a slightly older cousin, now deceased, whose life documented in clippings and photos he has usurped for his own protection.) Doyle isn't quite fooled, but can't find a way to break Randall's alibi. Doyle starts to leave but lingers when he hears Red rush into Randall's office. Bobby has accidentally locked Kitty into the new vault, the combination for which hasn't been delivered by the manufacturer. (Curtain)

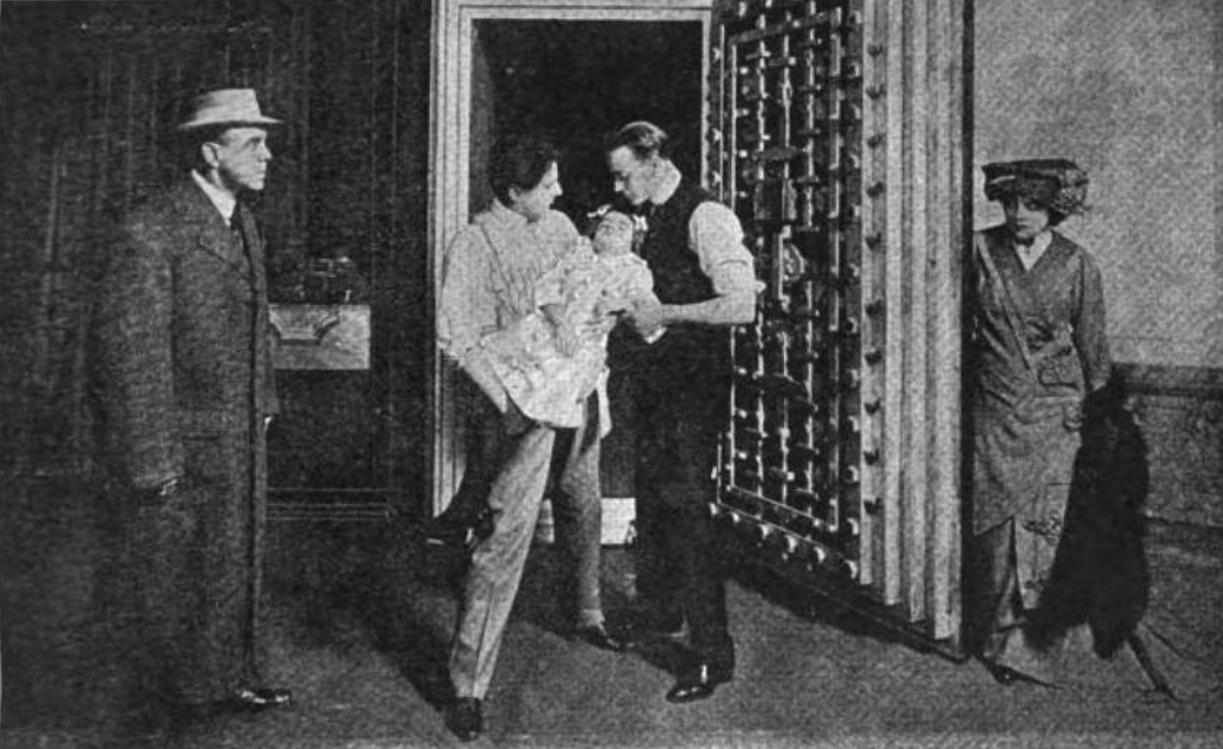

Act IV (Vault room of bank, moments later.) Red Joclyn has cleared the bank to cut down on noise. They can hear Kitty's muffled cries for help. Randall turns off the lights to avoid distraction as he tries to feel the tumblers click. Each time he feels one, Red lights a match to check the dial number. Doyle has crept silently into the room to watch, and a moment later, so does Rose. Randall sandpapers his fingertips to sensitize them. Painstakingly he works the dial, number by number. Joclyn grows worried; he can no longer hear Kitty. Finally, the last number is felt, and the vault door is swung open. Kitty is unconscious but alive; Red picks her up and rushes her to a doctor. Randall spots Doyle and realizes the game is up. But Doyle yields his captive to Rose, who now knows the truth about Randall but still wants him. (Curtain)

== Original production ==
=== Background ===
Liebler & Company was a partnership between investor T. A. Liebler and producer George C. Tyler. In his 1934 memoir, Tyler mentioned having bought the stage rights to A Retrieved Reformation as soon as he read it. Tyler commissioned Paul Armstrong to dramatize it, having been burnt before by Sydney Porter on turning his The World and the Door into a stage play. Armstrong wrote the play in a week, as he had for Liebler & Company's Salomy Jane in 1907.

Tyler intended the play as a reward for H. B. Warner, who had performed in several Liebler & Company productions. He also wanted Laurette Taylor for the female lead. Taylor was then appearing on Broadway in a supporting role for Mrs. Dakon's Daughter, and drawing praise from critics. Chicago Tribune critic Percy Hammond informed his readers "Miss Loretta Taylor... has precipitately left that play for reasons not made public and will appear as Mr. Warner's leading woman". Taylor penned a tart reply to the Tribune: "Just to ease your curiosity about why I have left the cast of Mrs. Dakon... I inform you that the Messrs. Shubert have rented me like real estate to the Messrs. Liebler to play in Alias Jimmy Valentine. My part is not good, but the play, I think, is original and wonderful and Mr. Warner is going to be splendid. What sins I have committed that I should be punished by having to play this role I don't know."

=== Cast ===
Principal cast for the Chicago opening and original Broadway run
Role	Actor	Dates	Notes and sources
Rose Lane	Laurette Taylor	Dec 25, 1909 - Jun 11, 1910	Despite her disdain for being "rented out" for a lightweight role, Taylor garnered favorable reviews.
Lee Randall	H. B. Warner	Dec 25, 1909 - Jun 11, 1910	This was Warner's first Broadway starring role; he had top billing in newspaper ads.
Handler	Harold Hartsell	Dec 25, 1909 - Jun 11, 1910	
Doyle	Frank Monroe	Dec 25, 1909 - Jun 11, 1910	
Bill Avery	Edmund Elton	Dec 25, 1909 - Jun 11, 1910	
William Lane	William T. Clifton	Dec 25, 1909 - Jun 11, 1910	
Red Joclyn	Joseph Touhy	Dec 25, 1909 - Jan 15, 1910	Touhy strained his vocal cords just before the Broadway premiere and had to be replaced.
Red Joclyn	Earl Brown	Jan 21, 1910 - Jun 11, 1910	
Blickendolfenbach	Loudan McCormack	Dec 25, 1909 - Jun 11, 1910	
Blinky Davis	Edward Bayes	Dec 25, 1909 - Jun 11, 1910	
Dick the Rat	Charles E. Graham	Dec 25, 1909 - Jun 11, 1910	
Mrs. Moore	Gail Y. Towers	Dec 25, 1909 - Jun 11, 1910	
Mrs. Webster	Maude Turner Gordon	Dec 25, 1909 - Jun 11, 1910	
Robert Fay	Frank Kingdon	Dec 25, 1909 - Jun 11, 1910	
Bobby Lane	Donald Gallaher	Dec 25, 1909 - Jun 11, 1910	
Kitty Lane	Alma Sedley	Jan 21, 1910 - Jun 11, 1910	This character was added during the rewrite for Broadway.
Smith	Albert Elliott	Jan 21, 1910 - Jun 11, 1910	This character was added during the rewrite for Broadway.
Williams	E. Coddington	Jan 21, 1910 - Jun 11, 1910	This character was added during the rewrite for Broadway.

=== Chicago opening ===
The play opened on December 25, 1909, at the Studebaker Theater in Chicago. The leading lady, Laurette Taylor had been in a taxicab accident the night before, and appeared on stage with a discolored eye and patches coverings cuts on her face. The Chicago Tribune reviewer remarked on how quickly Paul Armstrong had written the play and said it showed on stage: "It is palpably patched, with most of the characters and some of the scenes obviously introduced for the mere purposes of exposition and then fading away into unimportance". However, they admitted the play as entertainment worked well and the audience loved it. H. B. Warner's "prediliction to be artificial was not greatly in evidence" according to the Tribune critic, who saved their greatest accolades for Laurette Taylor. The Inter Ocean reviewer called Alias Jimmy Valentine "a likeable play, an effective play" and was generous with praise for the supporting actors.

Between Chicago and the Broadway premiere there was some minor rewriting, as evidenced by cast list and review discrepancies. Three minor characters were added: Smith, Williams and Kitty Lane. The latter became the child locked in the bank vault, instead of Bobby Lane.

=== Broadway premiere ===
Alias Jimmy Valentine opened at Wallack's Theatre on January 21, 1910. Originally scheduled for Tuesday, January 18, the unusual Friday premiere came as a result of an actor's vocal chord injury. Joseph Touhy, who was to play the major supporting role of Red Joclyn, could not go on. The producers cancelled performances until replacement Earl Brown was ready.

In spite of the delay, the first night audience was receptive to the melodrama. The reviewer for the Brooklyn Daily Times said: "...last night a good-sized crowd of Broadway's most proud and skeptical first nighters, armed with a polar coutenance and prepared to dislike anything, was thrilled". That reviewer also reported "The play occasionally rose above melodrama, but as one lady in the orchestra, who was low-necked in both gown and vocabulary, said, it was 'loose-jointed'." The New-York Tribune critic praised the acting and Armstrong's writing, saying each act had "an effective climax", but noted Police Headquarters declared safecracking by touch impossible.

The author gave a curtain speech at the audience's insistence, (Note: George C. Tyler said that Paul Armstrong had "a notorious if innocent passion to give curtain speeches" (Tyler and Furnas, p.175). The practice of audiences demanding curtain speeches from authors was a phenomenon of American theater from the 1890's to just prior to World War I.) in which he acknowledged the play's debt to O. Henry's A Retrieved Reformation.

=== First season close ===
The play closed on Saturday, June 11, 1910, at Wallack's Theatre. The production then went on hiatus for two months, reopening for its second season on August 22, 1910, again at Wallack's Theatre, but with Elsie Leslie as the leading lady.

== Revival ==
Alias Jimmy Valentine had a brief revival on Broadway starting December 8, 1921, at the Gaiety Theatre. It starred Otto Kruger and Margalo Gillmore, with Harold Hartsell, Edmund Elton, and Earl Brown reprising their original roles.

== Adaptations ==
=== Film ===
- In 1915 Alias Jimmy Valentine directed by Maurice Tourneur and starring Robert Warwick that was distributed by World Film.
- In 1920 Alias Jimmy Valentine directed by Edmund Mortimer and Arthur Ripley, and starring Bert Lytell, released through Metro Pictures.
- In 1928 Alias Jimmy Valentine directed by Jack Conway and starring William Haines that was Metro-Goldwyn-Mayer's first sound film with dialogue sequences.
- In 1936 The Return of Jimmy Valentine directed by Lewis D. Collins and starring Roger Pryor, Charlotte Henry, Robert Warwick, Edgar Kennedy and J. Carrol Naish
- In 1942 The Affairs of Jimmy Valentine directed by Bernard Vorhaus and starring Dennis O'Keefe, Ruth Terry, and Gloria Dickson.

=== Radio ===
The story was adapted into a radio series, Alias Jimmy Valentine, that was broadcast from 1938 to 1939.

The story was adapted into a radio episode of CBS Radio Mystery Theater as Jimmy Valentine's Gamble on January 16, 1977.

== Bibliography ==
- George C. Tyler and J. C. Furnas. Whatever Goes Up. Bobbs Merrill, 1934.
