= A Retrieved Reformation =

- Short story by O. Henry
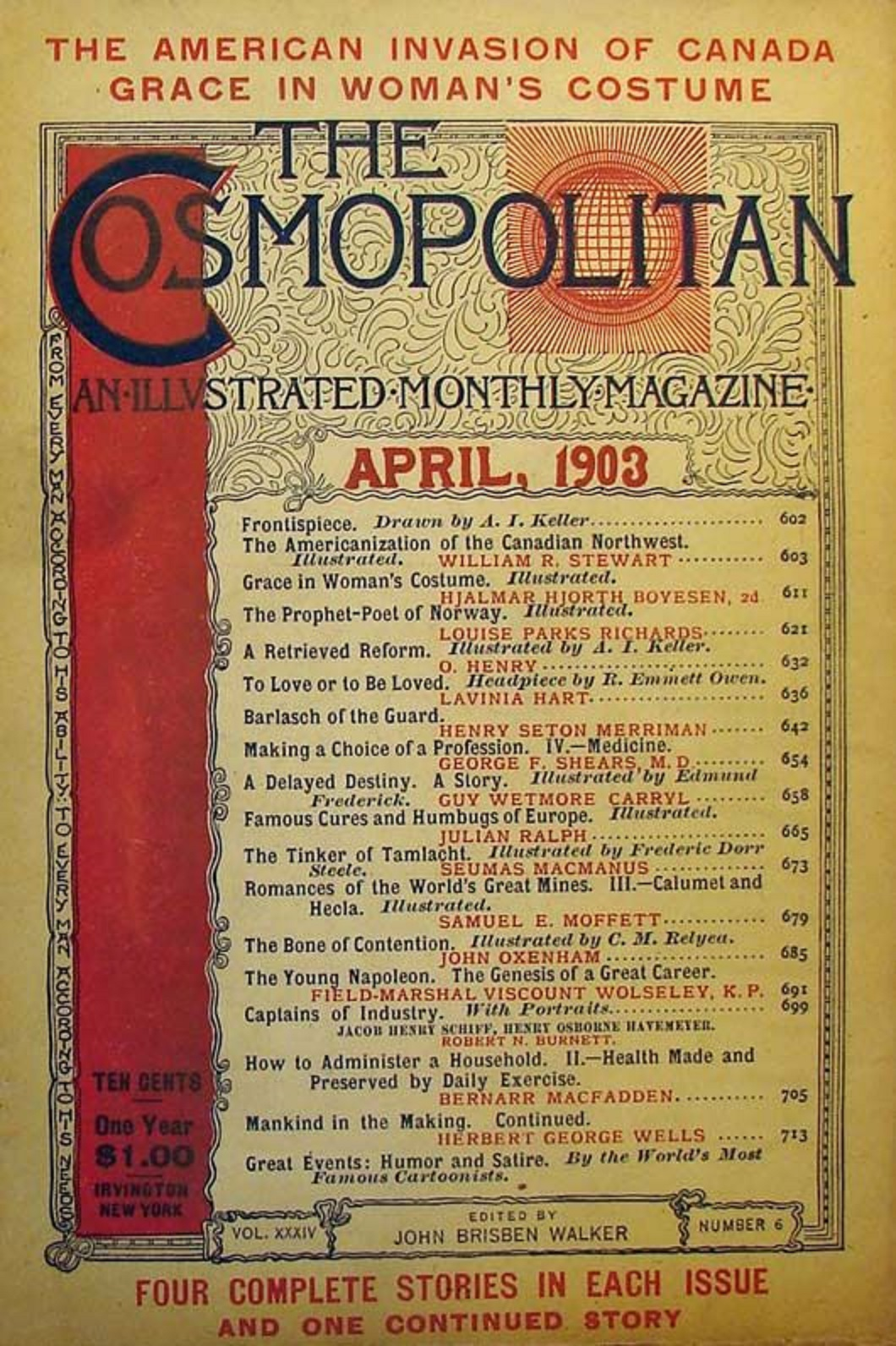
- Original title: A Retrieved Reform
- Country: United States
- Language: English
- Genre: Short story

Publication
- Published in: The Cosmopolitan Magazine
- Publication date: April 1903

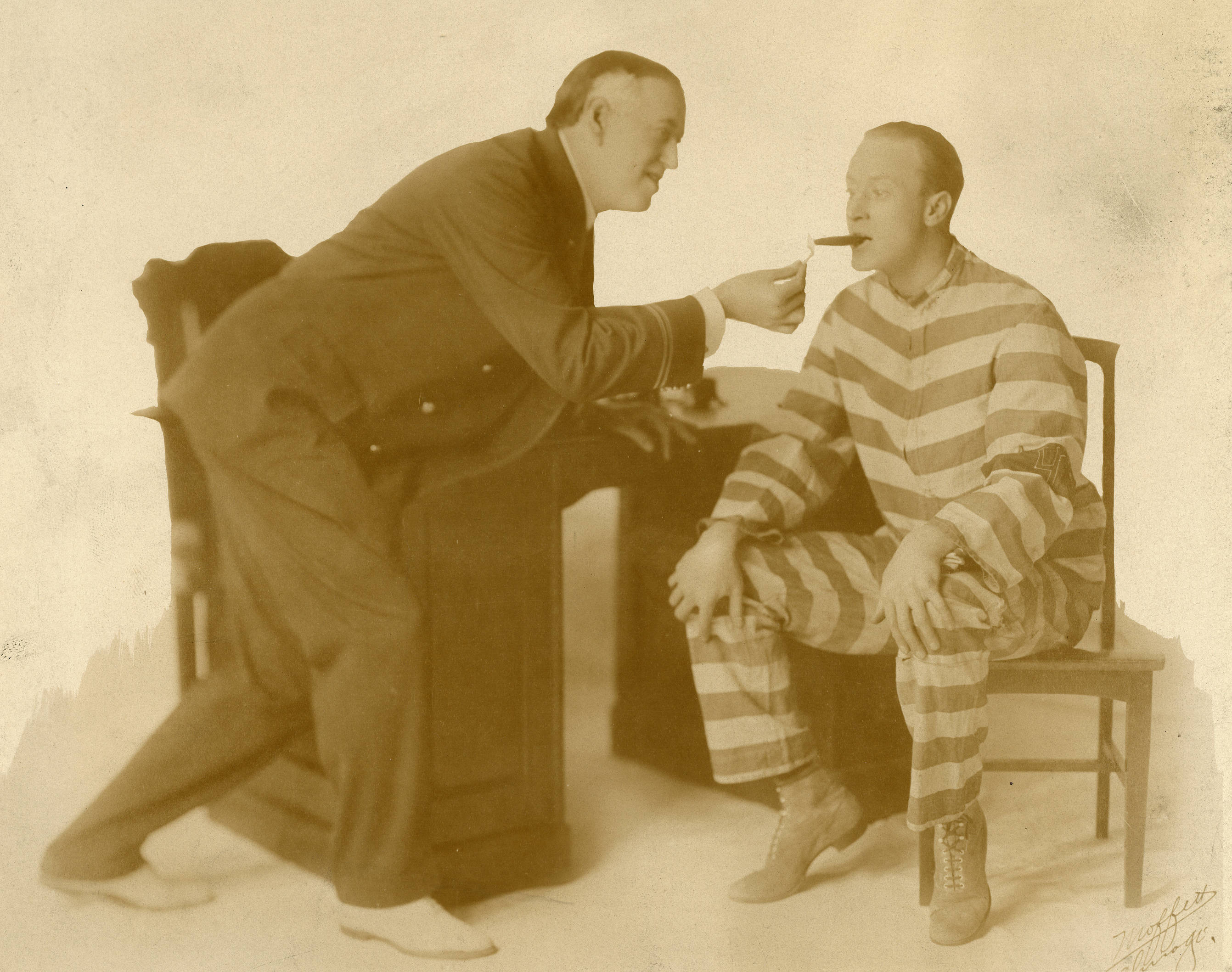
Harold Hartsell and H. B. Warner in the original Broadway production of Alias Jimmy Valentine (1910)

"A Retrieved Reformation"
The Cosmopolitan Magazine, April 1903. (text)

"A Retrieved Reformation" is a short story by American author O. Henry first published in The Cosmopolitan Magazine, April 1903. The original title was "A Retrieved Reform". It was illustrated by A.I. Keller.

== History ==
The story describes the events which lead up to the reformation of an ex-convict. In 1910, dramatist Paul Armstrong adapted the story into a highly successful Broadway play under the title Alias Jimmy Valentine which ran 155 performances at Wallack's Theatre in New York.

The play was subsequently adapted for many film versions:

- In 1915, Alias Jimmy Valentine directed by Maurice Tourneur and starring Robert Warwick that was distributed by World Film.
- In 1920, Alias Jimmy Valentine directed by Edmund Mortimer and Arthur Ripley, and starring Bert Lytell, released through Metro Pictures.
- In 1928, Alias Jimmy Valentine directed by Jack Conway and starring William Haines that was Metro-Goldwyn-Mayer's first sound film with dialogue sequences.
- In 1936, The Return of Jimmy Valentine directed by Lewis D. Collins and starring Roger Pryor, Charlotte Henry, Robert Warwick, Edgar Kennedy and J. Carrol Naish
- In 1942, The Affairs of Jimmy Valentine directed by Bernard Vorhaus and starring Dennis O'Keefe, Ruth Terry, and Gloria Dickson.

The popularity of the story as a motion picture added greatly to the author's vogue, though in the English, French, and Spanish versions O. Henry's name was not mentioned. The character of Jimmy Valentine is taken from life, but there is a close parallel to the leading incident in chapter XLII of Hugo's Les Misérables.

The story was adapted into a radio series, Alias Jimmy Valentine, that was broadcast from 1938 to 1939.

The story was adapted into a radio episode of CBS Radio Mystery Theater as Jimmy Valentine's Gamble on January 16, 1977.

== Synopsis ==
Safecracker Jimmy Valentine was released from prison after serving less than ten months of a four-year sentence, due to his criminal connections. He goes to his old apartment, packs up his tools, and leaves. In the following weeks, a few cash robberies are committed, and the detective who landed Valentine in jail in the first place, Ben Price, is called to work on the new case. He realizes that the robberies are committed in Jimmy's style.

Valentine shows up sometime later in Elmore, Arkansas. He goes to the town bank with the intention of checking it over before robbing it. However, as he walks to the hotel, he catches the eye of the banker's beautiful daughter, Annabel Adams. He falls in love with her immediately and instantly decides to give up his criminal career. He moves into the town, taking up the identity of Ralph D. Spencer, a shoemaker: he had been assigned shoemaking as forced labor in prison.

At the end of the year, Jimmy has risen socially and in business and has become engaged to Annabel. Two weeks before the wedding, he writes a letter to a friend, telling the friend to pick up the safe-cracker's tools that Valentine will not need anymore.

By this time, Price has tracked him down and shows up at the bank while Jimmy and Annabel's family are inside. Carrying the tool case, Jimmy watches as Annabel's father shows them the bank's new safe. Annabel's nieces are fascinated by it, and as they are playing, one accidentally shuts the other inside and locks the door, without the time lock's clock having been wound nor any combination set. Everyone panics, and Annabel begs Jimmy to do something. Jimmy, knowing that it will reveal his true identity, uses his case of tools to open the door and save the child. Unbeknownst to Valentine at that time, Price has witnessed the whole incident.

Valentine starts to leave the bank afterwards, and he sees Price standing by the door. Sheepishly, he gives himself up, but much to his surprise, Price pretends not to recognize him and walks away.
