= The Return of Jimmy Valentine =

1936 film by Lewis D. Collins

- Theatrical release poster
- Directed by: Lewis D. Collins
- Screenplay by: Olive Cooper; Jack Natteford
- Story by: Paul Armstrong Jr. William Scott Darling; Wallace Sullivan
- Produced by: Victor Zobel
- Starring: Roger Pryor; Charlotte Henry; Robert Warwick; James P. Burtis; Edgar Kennedy; J. Carrol Naish
- Cinematography: William Nobles
- Edited by: Dan Milner
- Production company: Republic Pictures
- Distributed by: Republic Pictures
- Release date: February 22, 1936
- Running time: 71 minutes
- Country: United States
- Language: English

The Return of Jimmy Valentine is a 1936 American crime film directed by Lewis D. Collins and written by Olive Cooper and Jack Natteford. The film is based on the 1909 play Alias Jimmy Valentine written by Paul Armstrong, that was based on the 1903 short story A Retrieved Reformation by O. Henry.

The film stars Roger Pryor, Charlotte Henry, Robert Warwick, James P. Burtis, Edgar Kennedy and J. Carrol Naish. The film was released on February 22, 1936, by Republic Pictures. Released for TV as Prison Shadows. The Return of Jimmy Valentine was remade in 1942 as The Affairs of Jimmy Valentine.

== Plot ==
A wisecracking newspaper reporter comes up with what he believes to be the ultimate publicity stunt: have the newspaper offer a $5000 prize to whoever can find Jimmy Valentine, a once notorious safecracker who seemed to have just disappeared from the scene, supposedly retired, but the reporter decides to try to collect the prize himself.

== Cast ==
- Roger Pryor as Gary Howard
- Charlotte Henry as Midge Davis
- Robert Warwick as Jimmy Davis
- James P. Burtis as Mac
- Edgar Kennedy as Callahan
- J. Carrol Naish as Tony Scapelli
- Lois Wilson as Mary Davis
- Charles C. Wilson as Kelley
- Wade Boteler as Red Dolan
- Gayne Whitman as Radio Actor
- Dewey Robinson as Augie Miller
- Hooper Atchley as Rocco
- William P. Carleton as Warden Keeley
- Frank Melton as Dixon
