= Tear Gas Squad =

- Directed by: Terry O. Morse
- Written by: Charles Belden; Don Ryan; Kenneth Gamet
- Produced by: Bryan Foy
- Starring: Dennis Morgan; John Payne; Gloria Dickson
- Cinematography: Sidney Hickox
- Edited by: Louis Hesse; Ernest J. Nims
- Music by: Jack Scholl; M.K. Jerome
- Production company: Warner Bros. Pictures
- Distributed by: Warner Bros. Pictures
- Release date: May 4, 1940
- Running time: 55 minutes
- Country: United States
- Language: English

Tear Gas Squad is a 1940 American drama film directed by Terry O. Morse and starring Dennis Morgan, John Payne and Gloria Dickson. The film was made under the working title of State Cop. It includes the song I'm an Officer of the Law (M.K. Jerome, Jack Scholl).

== Plot ==
Tommy McCabe (Dennis Morgan) is a cocky nightclub singer who gets his jollies out of making fun of the local police force. In fact, his act includes a parody of a policeman. This does not prove amusing to pretty Jerry Sullivan (Gloria Dickson), the daughter of a police lieutenant (Harry Shannon), nor to Jerry's flatfoot boyfriend Bill Morrissey (John Payne). Tommy falls in love with Jerry, but initially receives a cool reception from her father and brothers, who are also police officers. Tommy's singing in the Sullivan parlor melts the hearts of everyone but Morissey. Due to his love for Jerry, Tommy joins the police force. Jealous, Morrissey subjects him to a rigorous training program beyond what is typical for cadets. Eventually suspended from the police because of his carelessness, Tommy ends up saving the day by saving Morrisey's life. Tommy is finally reinstated in the force, thus rewarding Jerry's faith in him.

== Cast ==
- Dennis Morgan as Tommy McCabe
- John Payne as Bill Morrissey
- Gloria Dickson as Jerry Sullivan
- George Reeves as Joe McCabe
- Frank Wilcox as Sgt. Crump
- Herbert Anderson as Pliny Jones
- Julie Stevens as Lois
- Harry Shannon as Lt. Sullivan
- Mary Gordon as Mrs. Sullivan
- William Gould as Capt. Henderson
- John Hamilton as Chief Ferris
- Edgar Buchanan as Cousin Andy
- Dick Rich as Cousin Pat
- William Hopper as George (as DeWolf Hopper)
- Adrian Morris as Crusty, The Hit-Man

== Critical reception ==
In The New York Times, Bosley Crowther wrote, "Tear Gas Squad, now at the Palace, is not the sort of propaganda to inspire confidence in the guardians of the public peace, nor, for that matter, in its highly improbable plot...if the film is dubious as a tribute to the police force, it is even more so as entertainment"; while Allmovie wrote, "Tear Gas Squad manages to pack thrills, comedy, romance and songs into a neat 55-minute package."
