= Alias Jimmy Valentine (1915 film) =

1915 film directed by Maurice Tourneur

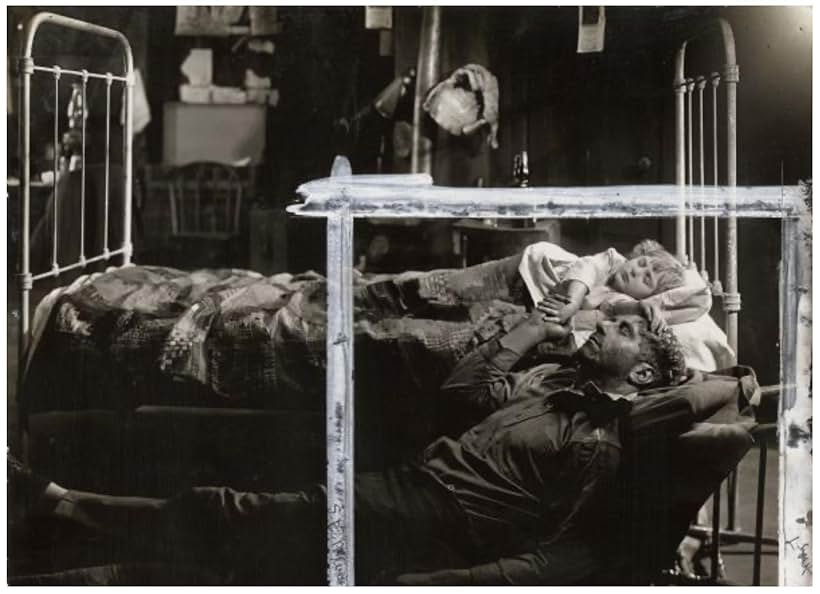
- Directed by: Maurice Tourneur
- Written by: Maurice Tourneur
- Produced by: William A. Brady
- Starring: Robert Warwick; Robert Cummings; Alec B. Francis
- Production company: Peerless Productions
- Distributed by: World Film
- Release date: February 22, 1915
- Running time: 50 minutes
- Country: United States
- Languages: Silent; English intertitles

Alias Jimmy Valentine is a 1915 American silent crime film directed by Maurice Tourneur and starring Robert Warwick, Robert Cummings and Alec B. Francis. It is based on the 1909 play Alias Jimmy Valentine, which was subsequently made into films again in 1920 and 1928. The play was based on the O. Henry short story "A Retrieved Reformation".

== Plot ==
According to a film magazine, "Rose Fay one day is riding in a railroad parlor car and suffers an insult by a fellow passenger, from whose brutality she is defended and saved by a handsome young stranger, who, assured that she will not be further molested, disappears from the scene. But Rose has fallen in love with her savior, and her love does not diminish by the lapse of three years. One day she is visiting Sing Sing in company of her father, the Lieutenant Governor of the State, and among the convicts she recognizes her deliverer in the person of Lee Randall alias Jimmy Valentine, who is suffering imprisonment for a crime of which he so vehemently and convincingly pleads his ignorance that the Lieutenant Governor secures his release.

He is given a chance of retrieving his reputation: his appointment to a position in a bank of which Mr. Lane is president is the means. He goes straight. His old associates are after him, but he wards them off. The detectives try to pounce on him for offenses of which he may be convicted, but he adroitly proves an alibi every time.

Jimmy enjoys a reputation of being the most expert safe opener known. The touch of his delicate, sensitive finger tips is irresistible. One day a little girl, sister to Rose Fay, his fiancee, is accidentally locked in the bank safe. Nobody is at hand who knows the combination that will open it. The child seems doomed to suffocation. In the crisis Lee Randall comes forward. With finger tips that have been pared to the quick for the work, he toils steadfastly and silently until he opens the safe. The child is released. But on the evidence of his marvelously nefarious skill the waiting detective arrests him. The intervention of Rose, however, secures Lee's final deliverance as the detective concedes that she has more need of him than the State of Massachusetts."

== Cast ==
- Robert Warwick as Jimmy Valentine
- Robert Cummings as Doyle
- Alec B. Francis as Bill Avery
- Frederick Truesdell as Lt. Gov. Fay
- Ruth Shepley as Rose Fay
- Johnny Hines as Red Joclyn
- D.J. Flanagan as Cotton
- Walter Craven as Handler
- John Boone as Blinkey Davis
- Thomas Mott Osborne as himself
- Nora Cecil as Nurse
- Madge Evans as Child Locked in Vault

== Production ==
Scenes of prisoners working in a quarry, marching, and at recreation were shot on location at Sing Sing prison, with the prisoners acting as extras. On February 14, the film was screened at the prison.

== See also ==
- Alias Jimmy Valentine (radio program)

== Bibliography ==
- Waldman, Harry. Maurice Tourneur: The Life and Films. McFarland, 2001.
