= The Big Boss (1941 film) =

1941 film

- Directed by: Charles Barton
- Written by: Howard J. Greene
- Produced by: Wallace MacDonald
- Starring: Otto Kruger; Gloria Dickson; John Litel
- Cinematography: Benjamin H. Kline
- Edited by: Viola Lawrence
- Production company: Columbia Pictures
- Distributed by: Columbia Pictures
- Release date: April 28, 1941
- Running time: 70 minutes
- Country: United States
- Language: English

The Big Boss is a 1941 American crime drama film directed by Charles Barton and starring Otto Kruger, Gloria Dickson and John Litel. It was produced and distributed by Columbia Pictures.

== Cast ==
- Otto Kruger as Jim Maloney
- Gloria Dickson as Sue Peters
- John Litel as Bob Dugan
- Don Beddoe as Cliff Randal
- Robert Fiske as George Fellows
- George Lessey as Williams
- Joe Conti as Tony

== Bibliography ==
- Dick, Bernard F. Columbia Pictures: Portrait of a Studio. University Press of Kentucky, 2015.
- Fetrow, Alan G. Feature Films, 1940-1949: a United States Filmography. McFarland, 1994.
- Langman, Larry & Finn, Daniel. A Guide to American Crime Films of the Forties and Fifties. Greenwood Press, 1995.
