= List of CBS Radio Mystery Theater episodes (1977 season) =

Season of American radio series

This is an episode list for the 1977 season of the radio drama series CBS Radio Mystery Theater. The series premiered on CBS on January 6, 1974, and ended on December 31, 1982. A set of 1,399 original episodes aired between January 1974 and December 1982. The series was broadcast every day of the week for the first six years with re-runs filling in empty slots starting in February 1974. All episodes are available free at the Internet Archive.

== List of seasons ==
Episode list	# of episodes
List of CBS Radio Mystery Theater episodes (1974 season)	193
List of CBS Radio Mystery Theater episodes (1975 season)	212
List of CBS Radio Mystery Theater episodes (1976 season)	170
List of CBS Radio Mystery Theater episodes (1977 season)	186
List of CBS Radio Mystery Theater episodes (1978 season)	176
List of CBS Radio Mystery Theater episodes (1979 season)	106
List of CBS Radio Mystery Theater episodes (1980 season)	97
List of CBS Radio Mystery Theater episodes (1981 season)	132
List of CBS Radio Mystery Theater episodes (1982 season)	127

== 1977 episodes ==
=== January ===
No. overall	No. in season	Title	Directed by	Written by	Original release date
576	1	"Whose Little Girl Are You?"	Himan Brown	Sam Dann	January 3, 1977
A tennis star recounts how she lost her stellar backhand shot and other events that put her into a pill-induced, suicidal, manic-depressive state. Starring: Marian Seldes
577	2	"This Breed Is Doomed"	Himan Brown	Ian Martin	January 4, 1977
A con man tricks a small town's residents and takes away a piece of baggage known as irony. Starring: Howard Da Silva
578	3	"The Man From Ultra"	Himan Brown	Alfred Bester	January 6, 1977
An interstellar traveler who can't comprehend love inadvertently ruins the mind of a talented but mentally fragile artist. Starring: Court Benson, Robert Burr
579	4	"Conquest of Fear"	Himan Brown	Ian Martin	January 7, 1977
In Spain, a desperado abducts a famous actress who convinces him to leave behind his life of crime and return to a previous career that made him famous — bullfighting. Starring: Tammy Grimes, Sam Gray
580	5	"Two Renegades"	Himan Brown	Sam Dann	January 10, 1977
A case of mistaken identity turns a con artist into a Panamanian army general; his incompetence attracts the interest of Panama's enemies. Starring: Robert Dryden, Ralph Bell; Note: The first of a weeklong series of adaptations from the short stories of O. Henry, with Bob Dryden providing the voice of the writer.
581	6	"The Passing of Black Eagle"	Himan Brown	Sam Dann	January 11, 1977
A panhandler has two personalities: When drunk, he's a meek, easygoing beggar; when sober, he's a fearsome, grandiose, train-robber. Starring: Robert Dryden (as O. Henry), Larry Haines; Adapted from a short story by O. Henry
582	7	"Tobin's Palm"	Himan Brown	Sam Dann	January 12, 1977
An adaptation of the O. Henry story finds the titular character having his palm read in order to help find his missing fiancée. Instead, the fortune teller sends him on an amusing series of misadventures. Starring: Robert Dryden (as O. Henry), Fred Gwynne, Marian Seldes
583	8	"Don't Die Without Me"	Himan Brown	Sam Dann	January 13, 1977
O. Henry curiously observes a police investigation of two people who appeared to have committed suicide in the same room of a seedy boarding house. Starring: Robert Dryden (as O. Henry), Marian Seldes, Russell Horton, Joan Shay; Adapted from O. Henry's short story "The Furnished Room"
584	9	"A Departmental Case"	Himan Brown	Sam Dann	January 14, 1977
In Austin, Texas, O. Henry learns why an insurance commissioner tracked down and killed a wife-beating, bank-robbing desperado... and how the killer and the victim weren't all that different. Starring: Robert Dryden (as O. Henry), Joe Silver; Adapted from a short story by O. Henry
585	10	"Cherchez la Femme"	Himan Brown	Sam Dann	January 15, 1977
A French Quarter restaurateur hires a private eye to track down the $10,000 she entrusted to a long-time customer who unexpectedly died. Starring: Robert Dryden (as O. Henry), Bryna Raeburn; Adapted from a short story by O. Henry
586	11	"Jimmy Valentine's Gamble"	Himan Brown	Sam Dann	January 16, 1977
Ready to crack safes again (after serving prison time for doing so), Jimmy Valentine has a change of heart when a banker's daughter steals his heart. But Jimmy must reuse his old skills when a crisis forces him to perform one last job. Starring: Robert Dryden (as O. Henry), Paul Hecht, Catherine Byers, Court Benson, Kenneth Harvey; Adapted from O. Henry's short story "A Retrieved Reformation"
587	12	"Son of Satan"	Himan Brown	Elspeth Eric	January 17, 1977
A couple rekindle acquaintances with an old friend who's joined a devil-worshiping cult, going so far as to entrust him to babysit their infant son. Starring: Gordon Gould, Ralph Bell
588	13	"The Woman in Red"	Himan Brown	Sam Dann	January 19, 1977
A famous painting is stolen by an unlikely thief, one who has specific long-term plans for the work of art. Starring: Robert L. Green
589	14	"Happy Death Day"	Himan Brown	Ian Martin	January 21, 1977
An obese woman seeks help from a renowned psychologist to help explain her recurring nightmares of being pushed to her death by a faceless man. Starring: Marian Seldes, Mandel Kramer
590	15	"License to Kill"	Himan Brown	Sam Dann	January 24, 1977
Defensive end Billy Chapman loses his spot on the football team, his coach believing he lacks a "killer instinct" on the field. But with his wife facing a difficult (and expensive) medical crisis, Billy asks the coach for another shot. When the coach obliges, Billy gives "killer instinct" a horrifying new meaning. Starring: Tony Roberts, Fred Gwynne, Marian Seldes, Robert Maxwell
591	16	"The White Wolf"	Himan Brown	Ian Martin	January 26, 1977
A werewolf stalks a family living in the remote wilderness; despite the mystery surrounding the creature, the children have strong suspicions as to who it really is. Starring: Norman Rose, Kristoffer Tabori, Jada Rowland, Ann Sheppard, Paul Tripp
592	17	"My Fair Lady-Killer"	Himan Brown	Sam Dann	January 28, 1977
A police detective investigates a series of deaths involving promiscuous women, but is puzzled when evidence points to the one person who doesn't fit the criminal profilers' description. Starring: Michael Tolan
593	18	"A Casual Affair"	Himan Brown	Sam Dann	January 31, 1977
While traveling for business, Richard Pomeroy meets a woman at a restaurant and begins an affair with her. Soon, however, he is blackmailed into a dangerous situation, one he must take part in lest his wife and boss learn of his infidelity. Starring: Mason Adams, Evelyn Juster, Robert Dryden

=== February ===
No. overall	No. in season	Title	Directed by	Written by	Original release date
594	19	"The Cat is Dead"	Himan Brown	Ian Martin	February 2, 1977
Returning to France for an old friend's funeral, a married couple reminisce the first time they met in that country, when the wife was a member of the French Resistance and the husband was an American soldier. Starring: Marian Seldes, Ian Martin
595	20	"The Ripple Effect"	Himan Brown	Sam Dann	February 4, 1977
A politician attempts to recover several scandalous love letters from a bitter ex-mistress, unwittingly setting off a chain of events that may ruin several lives as well as his own. Starring: Les Tremayne
596	21	"I Pronounce You Dead"	Himan Brown	Elspeth Eric	February 7, 1977
Teenage angst leads a girl to witchcraft... and a fear, after awaking from a dream, that she has killed her family. Starring: Morgan Fairchild
597	22	"The Aurora Group"	Himan Brown	Sam Dann	February 8, 1977
"We have a peculiar situation here... a juxtaposition of the old and the new." A quarter with a mint mark nine years into the future is only the first peculiar thing Zachary Eberhardt notices while realizing a mysterious business organization is impacting his life... to the point that he may be driven to kill his wife. Starring: Larry Haines, Ann Williams, Bryna Raeburn, Joe DeSantis, Leon Janney
598	23	"The Recluse"	Himan Brown	Roy Winsor	February 10, 1977
A man inherits a family inn from his grandmother, and with it a trove of familial secrets, namely what happened to his missing father and his fortune. Starring: Tony Roberts, Patricia Elliott
599	24	"Masquerade"	Himan Brown	Ian Martin	February 11, 1977
The disappearance of a valuable set of pearls at a masquerade ball throws a singer and her boyfriend into a case of espionage. Starring: Paul Hecht, Marian Seldes
600	25	"Stamped for Death"	Himan Brown	Elizabeth Pennell	February 14, 1977
Two greedy brothers inherit their late father's priceless stamp collection; when they misplace it, they try to swindle their elderly aunt and uncle out of theirs. Starring: Lloyd Battista, Russell Horton, Robert Dryden, Ann Pitoniak
601	26	"The Star Killers"	Himan Brown	Sam Dann	February 15, 1977
A top nuclear researcher recounts for her therapist how she fell in love with a supposed space alien... and was ultimately convicted of his murder. Starring: Mercedes McCambridge
602	27	"If Mischief Follow"	Himan Brown	Ian Martin	February 17, 1977
Just as a doctor is ready to announce her engagement to a colleague, her supposedly-dead first husband reappears, not only ready to resume their marriage... but also undergo an operation that the fiancé is best suited to perform. Starring: Anne Williams, Gordon Gould, Ralph Bell, Bryna Raeburn, Bob Readick
603	28	"A Heart of Gold"	Himan Brown	Bob Juhren	February 18, 1977
An evil, greedy, and murderous woman fulfills a desire to imprint her portrait on gold coins... but the stamped image is more indicative of her vainglorious character. Starring: Frances Sternhagen
604	29	"Orient Express"	Himan Brown	Ian Martin	February 21, 1977
An estranged couple are reunited — and are caught up in international intrigue — on the legendary train bound for Czechoslovakia. Starring: Mandel Kramer, Marian Seldes, Hans Conried, Leon Janney, Earl Hammond
605	30	"Jane Eyre"	Himan Brown	Elizabeth Pennell	February 22, 1977
An adaptation of Charlotte Brontë's classic tale of love and loss in 19th century England, where a governess falls for the lord of the manor, and then makes a new life for herself when she discovers he is married. Starring: Patricia Elliott, Arnold Moss
606	31	"Last Judgement"	Himan Brown	Roy Winsor	February 24, 1977
A young nurse becomes live-in caregiver to her father-in-law, but her world is shaken when she unwittingly learns how and why he's being haunted by dreams of his past. Starring: Norman Rose, Carmen Matthews, Teri Keane, Michael Wager, Nat Polen
607	32	"Legend of Phoenix Hill"	Himan Brown	Ian Martin	February 25, 1977
An archeologist takes his adopted son on an expedition to China that is besieged by setbacks; the reason may be the young man's dreams of the reincarnation of an ancient Chinese princess. Starring: Howard Da Silva, Robert Kaliban, Evie Juster, Ian Martin
608	33	"The Light That Failed"	Himan Brown	Sam Dann	February 28, 1977
A painter and war correspondent aims to amass a fortune to win over the woman he loves, but his plans fall apart when he scorns a woman he considers beneath his station. Starring: Mason Adams, Tony Roberts, Bryna Raeburn, Jackson Beck; An adaptation of the novel by Rudyard Kipling

=== March ===
No. overall	No. in season	Title	Directed by	Written by	Original release date
609	34	"The Hound of the Baskervilles"	Himan Brown	Murray Burnett	March 1, 1977
An adaptation of Arthur Conan Doyle's famous novel that finds Sherlock Holmes and Dr. Watson investigating murder and ghostly legend at a Devon estate. Starring: Kevin McCarthy, Lloyd Battista, Carol Teitel, Robert Dryden, Court Benson
610	35	"The Overcoat"	Himan Brown	Ian Martin	March 3, 1977
An underpaid Russian government clerk devotes his monetary savings (such as they are) to purchasing a tailor-made coat, but his hardships don't stop once it's on his shoulders. Starring: Hans Conried; Adapted from a short story by Nikolai Gogol
611	36	"Answer Me"	Himan Brown	Elspeth Eric	March 4, 1977
Distraught over his wife's death, a failed writer chucks it all and sets out for Mexico on foot. Along the way, he encounters a mother and daughter who share a strange bond. Starring: Larry Haines, Joan Banks, Rosemary Rice, Danny Ocko
612	37	"Beyond the Barrier"	Himan Brown	Stella Moss	March 7, 1977
After he is gravely injured in a car accident, a young research scientist has an out-of-body experience that reacquaints him with the people who greatly impacted his life. Starring: Russell Horton
613	38	"The Sign of the Four"	Himan Brown	Murray Burnett	March 8, 1977
A case of missing pearls leads Sherlock Holmes and Dr. Watson to a secret society that plagues its former members long after they break from the pact. Starring: Kevin McCarthy, Court Benson, Jackson Beck, Earl Hammond, Joan Shay; Adapted from the novel by Arthur Conan Doyle
614	39	"The Pleading Voice"	Himan Brown	Roy Winsor	March 10, 1977
A teenager recuperating from illness hears a voice begging to be let into a ruined building. Starring: Corinne Orr, William Griffis, Gordon Gould, Robert Dryden, Bryna Raeburn
615	40	"Till Death Do Us Part"	Himan Brown	Sam Dann	March 11, 1977
A spinster becomes romantically entangled with her boss... but when she learns he promised never to leave his wife, she hatches a plan to end that setup. Starring: Tammy Grimes, Ian Martin, Evelyn Juster
616	41	"Look Backward Sometimes"	Himan Brown	Ian Martin	March 14, 1977
A tennis pro flees for Europe after a fight with her husband, but her character-judging skills come in handy as she and her fellow plane passengers try to survive after their plane crashes. Starring: Roberta Maxwell
617	42	"The Shining Man"	Himan Brown	Ian Martin	March 15, 1977
After relocating to Scotland for new employment, a young couple call on their parapsychologist uncle to investigate why the windows of their new house mysteriously glow at night. Starring: Robert Kaliban, Morgan Fairchild, Ian Martin, Ralph Bell; Adapted from a story by E. & H. Heron
618	43	"Jobo"	Himan Brown	Henry Slesar	March 17, 1977
An archeologist and his daughter investigate why a slow-witted farmhand would be considered heir to the gods of Easter Island. Starring: Earl Hammond, William Griffis, Russell Horton, Evelyn Juster, Jason Beck
619	44	"Little Green Death"	Himan Brown	Sam Dann	March 18, 1977
A hot-shot big-city lawyer is called on to defend a small-town bookstore owner accused of murder. The client doesn't remember committing the murder, but begins to believe his own guilt upon seeing the overwhelming evidence. Starring: Kim Hunter, Robert Dryden, Carol Teitel, Nat Polen
620	45	"The Eighth Deadly Sin"	Himan Brown	Ian Martin	March 21, 1977
A famous writer falls in love with a seductive actress with a taste for adventure; but the relationship becomes strained when she risks her life and fortune in a high-stakes gamble. Starring: Patricia Elliott, Larry Haines
621	46	"The Imposter"	Himan Brown	Elspeth Eric	March 22, 1977
A woman with no previous theatrical experience writes a full-length play with the assistance of an actor who's been dead for 50 years. But the spirit asserts himself when the woman takes full credit for the story before its premiere. Starring: Bryna Raeburn, Don Scardino, Norman Rose, Ann Pitoniak
622	47	"The Gift of Doom"	Himan Brown	Arnold Moss	March 24, 1977
The ancient Greek tragedy Medea is the inspiration for this episode set during the Klondike Gold Rush, where a snowbound prospector is saved by, falls for, and later desires to be rid of an indigenous witch whose magical touch has the power to heal — or kill. Starring: Kim Hunter, Arnold Moss, Mason Adams, Russell Horton, Bryna Raeburn
623	48	"A Study in Scarlet"	Himan Brown	Murray Burnett	March 25, 1977
An adaptation of the Arthur Conan Doyle novel that first paired Sherlock Holmes and Dr. Watson on a murder case involving a valuable engagement ring and a mysterious word scrawled in blood. Starring: Kevin McCarthy, Court Benson, Mary Jane Higby, Earl Hammond, Ian Martin
624	49	"The Warriors from Loanda"	Himan Brown	Roy Winsor	March 28, 1977
Heat, humidity, and disease take their toll on two unscrupulous ivory hunters after they're stranded in an isolated African jungle. Starring: Robert Dryden, William Griffis, Joan Arliss, Joseph Silver; Adapted from Joseph Conrad's short story "An Outpost of Progress"
625	50	"The Coldest Killer"	Himan Brown	Sam Dann	March 29, 1977
Completely enamored with each other, a faithless wife and her husband's business partner scheme to dispatch the two hindrances to their affair — her nosy mother-in-law and her husband himself. Starring: Joan Lovejoy, Bobby Reddick, Lloyd Battista, Joan Shay, Gilbert Mack
626	51	"Death Is Blue"	Himan Brown	Sam Dann	March 31, 1977
Edward Bascomb hires private eye Julia Hoffman to look into the playboy fiancé of his unattractive sister. Edward believes the lothario is only in it for the money... but, in a way, so is Edward. Starring: Frances Sternhagen, Ralph Bell, Ian Martin, Bryna Raeburn, Marian Seldes

=== April ===
No. overall	No. in season	Title	Directed by	Written by	Original release date
627	52	"You Bet Your Life"	Himan Brown	Ian Martin	April 1, 1977
An expectant father and gambling addict swears off his addiction after a big loss... but is back to playing the ponies after he loses his job. Starring: Paul Hecht, Morgan Fairchild
628	53	"So Shall Ye Reap"	Himan Brown	Arnold Moss	April 4, 1977
A small town in 1850s New Mexico suffers a curse that includes children dying and women becoming barren. The town's mayor desperately seeks a solution... but in doing so discovers an unspeakable horror from his past. Starring: Russell Horton, John Beal
629	54	"The Sensitive"	Himan Brown	Elspeth Eric	April 5, 1977
An occult-averse skeptic joins in on a séance with his wife and his boss, and soon realizes that he can manifest spirits into the physical world. Starring: Gordon Gould, Teri Keane
630	55	"The High Priest"	Himan Brown	Sam Dann	April 7, 1977
A swindler tries to convince an art appraiser into declaring that his counterfeit painting is a million-dollar genuine article. Starring: Robert Dryden
631	56	"Blood, Thunder and a Woman in Green"	Himan Brown	Fletcher Markle	April 8, 1977
In the 1940s, a private detective stumbles into a murder investigation when his tabloid photographer friend is brutally slain over a controversial photo he captured. Starring: Mandel Kramer
632	57	"The Meteorite"	Himan Brown	Roy Winsor	April 11, 1977
A meteorite that crashed into a farm field is claimed by a college professor, who discovers upon examination that it's much more than it appears to be. Starring: John Beal, Marian Seldes, Joe Silver, Evie Juster, Russell Horton.
633	58	"Man-Size in Marble"	Himan Brown	Ian Martin	April 12, 1977
An American on an extended working holiday in the British Isles discovers they're linked to a prophetic local legend centered around a blasphemous act in a cursed church. Starring: Paul Hecht, Roberta Maxwell, Frances Sternhagen, Fred Gwynne; Adapted from a short story by Edith Nesbit
634	59	"The Phantom House"	Himan Brown	Ian Martin	April 14, 1977
While summering in turn-of-the-century rural Virginia, a young girl is haunted by the image of a house destroyed more than 50 years before. Starring: Marian Seldes, Mason Adams, Ian Martin, Morgan Fairchild, Anne Pitoniak
635	60	"Borderline Case"	Himan Brown	Sam Dann	April 15, 1977
The clairvoyant young daughter of a town sheriff gazes into an old woman's smoky-gray pearl, not only learning of its terrible history but also foreseeing its owner's murder. Starring: Murray Flersheim, Ken Harvey, Russell Horton, Bryna Raeburn, Ray Owens
636	61	"A House Divided"	Himan Brown	Arnold Moss	April 18, 1977
A man returns from four years of Army service to seek revenge for the murder of his district attorney father, who was killed by his mother and her mob-connected lover. Starring: Larry Haines, Joan Lovejoy
637	62	"The Book of Abaca"	Himan Brown	Sam Dann	April 19, 1977
A doomed oil freighter's captain and engineer are subjected to the contents of the ship's log when the freighter's owner claims it for his own. Starring: Allen Swift, Robert Dryden, Court Benson
638	63	"Come Away Death"	Himan Brown	Ian Martin	April 21, 1977
An old lawyer swaps jobs with The Grim Reaper in an effort to forestall his passing. Starring: William Griffis, Norman Rose
639	64	"The Prisoner of Zenda"	Himan Brown	Robert Newman	April 22, 1977
A new king's coronation is disrupted when he is drugged by his brother and replaced by a distant relative who bears a close resemblance to the new monarch. Starring: Howard Ross, Leon Janney, Evelyn Juster, Lloyd Battista, Dan Ocko; Adapted from the novel by Anthony Hope
640	65	"Bound East for Haiti"	Himan Brown	Roy Winsor	April 25, 1977
The first mate aboard a tramp steamer attempts to curse his captain with black magic in an effort to claim his girlfriend. Starring: Mason Adams, Fred Gwynne
641	66	"The Adventure of the Red-Headed League"	Himan Brown	Murray Burnett	April 26, 1977
Sherlock Holmes aids a friend who's been swindled by a group of red-headed men... and in doing so uncovers a much larger scheme. Starring: Kevin McCarthy, Court Benson, Robert Dryden, Ian Martin; Adapted from a short story by Arthur Conan Doyle
642	67	"The Second-Chance Lady"	Himan Brown	Sam Dann	April 28, 1977
A door-to-door cosmetics saleswoman tries to stay alive after unwittingly stumbling onto a bank robber's lair. Starring: Marian Seldes, Teri Keane
643	68	"Wuthering Heights"	Himan Brown	Elizabeth Pennell	April 29, 1977
A prodigal son returns to his family's homestead hellbent on seizing control from the relatives that mistreated him during his youth. Starring: Paul Hecht, Bryna Raeburn, Russell Horton, Roberta Maxwell, Lloyd Battista; Adapted from the novel by Emily Brontë

=== May ===
No. overall	No. in season	Title	Directed by	Written by	Original release date
644	69	"Much Too Much"	Himan Brown	Gerald Keane	May 2, 1977
Based on a Leo Tolstoy story, this farce finds the ruler of a tiny kingdom not desiring the money needed to purchase a guillotine... but no other more cost-effective means to execute or punish a prisoner can be found. Starring: Robert Dryden, Court Benson, Ian Martin, Earl Hammond
645	70	"The Luck Sisters"	Himan Brown	Sam Dann	May 3, 1977
The story of twin sisters cursed by opposite types of luck (one good, the other bad), and what their superstitious mining town neighbors will do to ensure a chance to get rich won't escape them. Starring: Bryna Raeburn, Fred Gwynne, Russell Horton, Carol Teitel
646	71	"Reunion Fever"	Himan Brown	Sam Dann	May 5, 1977
As a mysterious virus strikes attendees of a class reunion (some fatally), one member of the class receives an offer: For a $10,000 fee, an antidote can be his. Starring: Phyllis Newman, Paul Hecht, Robert Kaliban, Evie Juster, Joe Silver
647	72	"Bottom of the World"	Himan Brown	Arnold Moss	May 6, 1977
Set far in the future, this story follows a team of scientists fleeing a planet in deep freeze, while dodging an unknown set of "others" who want to prevent their departure. Starring: Tony Roberts, Kristoffer Tabori, William Griffis, Robert Maxwell
648	73	"Mayerling Revisited"	Himan Brown	Nancy Moore	May 16, 1977
An engaged couple must confront the groom's rich, domineering father and his opposition to the nuptials — a situation that, in the bride's dreams, plagued a similar couple 100 years earlier in the same house. Starring: Marian Seldes, Paul Hecht, Ian Martin, Joan Shay
649	74	"The Child's Cat's Paw"	Himan Brown	Ian Martin	May 17, 1977
A young girl and a peculiar cat aim to spark a love connection between an elderly man and a gold-digging woman. The girl's motives are sincere; the cat's, on the other hand... Starring: Sarah Parker, Bryna Raeburn, Earl Hammond, Evie Juster, Guy Sorel
650	75	"A Matter of Customs"	Himan Brown	Ian Martin	May 19, 1977
A detective novel enthusiast and her husband go on a sea cruise, where they repeatedly encounter another couple. But one couple's constant changing of husbands arouses suspicion in the other. Starring: Mary Jane Higby, Court Benson
651	76	"Wine, Women and Murder"	Himan Brown	Sam Dann	May 20, 1977
A mild-mannered book seller is framed for murder while attending a literary festival in Germany; his only hope is an assistant secretary at the consulate who displays only mild interest in his predicament. Starring: Robert Dryden, Robert Kaliban, Carol Teitel, William Griffis
652	77	"The Briefcase Blunder"	Himan Brown	Karen Thorsen	May 23, 1977
Harry finds a briefcase full of money in the back of his cab, but trouble befalls him when he turns it in to the police in the hopes its owner will claim it. Starring: Paul Hecht, Anne Williams
653	78	"Transmutation, Inc."	Himan Brown	Sam Dann	May 24, 1977
Small-time gambler Bones Terwilliger must decide between good and evil when he does an act of kindness for a man who reveals himself as the Devil and makes Terwilliger a tempting offer — great wealth, in exchange for his soul. Starring: Norman Rose, Robert Dryden, Bryna Raeburn
654	79	"The Countess"	Himan Brown	Gerald Keane	May 26, 1977
A French countess recounts her brief attraction to a Spanish prisoner of war and her marriage to a brutal French dignitary. Starring: Marian Seldes, Roberta Maxwell; Adapted from the story by Honoré de Balzac
655	80	"Guilty Secret"	Himan Brown	Sam Dann	May 27, 1977
A U.S. Senator is worried that an indiscretion from his past will be used against him while he campaigns for the presidency. Starring: Mandel Kramer
656	81	"The Silent Witness"	Himan Brown	Roy Winsor	May 30, 1977
Visions of an open grave, and memories triggered by his new assistant's wife, plague a banker in Hawai'i. Starring: Ralph Bell
657	82	"The Boscombe Pool Mystery"	Himan Brown	Murray Burnett	May 31, 1977
Sherlock Holmes investigates when the son of a wealthy land owner is murdered; despite irrefutable evidence against the lad, Holmes doubts his guilt. Starring: Kevin McCarthy, Court Benson, Patricia Elliott, Ian Martin, Dallas Cole; Based on the short story "The Boscombe Valley Mystery" by Arthur Conan Doyle

=== June ===
No. overall	No. in season	Title	Directed by	Written by	Original release date
658	83	"A God Named Smith"	Himan Brown	Henry Slesar	June 2, 1977
A child prodigy creates an entire planet of his own, and establishes himself as its god, with the intent to make it a better world than Earth. Starring: Norman Rose, Russell Horton
659	84	"The Two-Dollar Murders"	Himan Brown	Sam Dann	June 3, 1977
A man kills a cop in an effort to cover up a romantic affair and a murder, but his plan is uncovered in the unlikeliest of manners. Starring: Robert Dryden, Larry Haines
660	85	"The Blood Red Wine"	Himan Brown	Sam Dann	June 6, 1977
Joel and Myra welcome into their home a stranger caught in a storm. But when the man dies of a heart attack, the couple ponder what to do with not only his dead body but also the $250,000 in stolen money that was on his person. Starring: Joan Lovejoy, Ralph Bell
661	86	"The Curse of Conscience"	Himan Brown	Ian Martin	June 7, 1977
A hustler encounters an elderly woman who tries to put him on the straight and narrow. But when he winds up in a bind, he takes advantage of her — and does so at his own risk. Starring: Tony Roberts, Mary Jane Higby, Bryna Raeburn, Earl Hammond
662	87	"Dialogue with Death"	Himan Brown	Elspeth Eric	June 9, 1977
A man reunites with a childhood love, but soon finds difficulty dealing with her peculiar habit of talking to her parents and her horse — who are all deceased. Starring: Paul Hecht, Evelyn Juster, Fred Gwynne
663	88	"The Night We Died"	Himan Brown	Henry Slesar	June 10, 1977
A veteran of a "lunar revolt" tries to scam a war widow in this story that blends elements of sci-fi, con artistry, and murder mystery. Starring: Bob Readick, Joan Shea, William Griffis, Jason Beck
664	89	"First Woman in Space"	Himan Brown	Victoria Dann	June 13, 1977
A pioneering female astronaut returns to Earth with a passenger — an alien living inside her and fighting to control her body in order to survive. Starring: Phyllis Newman
665	90	"Murder One"	Himan Brown	G. Frederick Lewis	June 14, 1977
A wealthy widow is blackmailed by her maid for killing her husband, so she tries to turn the tables and frame the maid for her own crime. Starring: Tammy Grimes, Teri Keane, Leon Janney
666	91	"Little Lucy's Lethal Libation"	Himan Brown	Sam Dann	June 16, 1977
A male ad executive is assigned to an account with an overbearing, publicity-shy female client... and soon starts to believe he's the victim of a plot by women to take over the world. Starring: Larry Haines, Bryna Raeburn, Joan Shay, Earl Hammond
667	92	"Two Motives for Murder"	Himan Brown	Roy Winsor	June 17, 1977
A young broker believes he's in hot water when $100,000 in bonds entrusted to him goes missing. But his troubles really begin when his boss invites him on his yacht to discuss the matter. Starring: Don Scardino, Evelyn Juster, Robert Dryden, Ian Martin
668	93	"The Birthmark"	Himan Brown	Elspeth Eric	June 20, 1977
A scientist develops a means of removing a birthmark on his wife's cheek, a blemish he believes to be holding her back from perfect beauty. Starring: Tony Roberts, Marian Seldes, Gordon Heath; Adapted from a story by Nathaniel Hawthorne
669	94	"Tomorrow, Cloudy and Cold"	Himan Brown	Bob Juhren	June 21, 1977
Dr. Herman Bruno subjects a young drifter to experiments that can allow the young man to control the weather with just his emotions. But what might happen when the test subject escapes? Starring: Norman Rose, Russell Horton
670	95	"The Red Circle"	Himan Brown	Roy Winsor	June 23, 1977
A housewife receives an unexpected visitor, an old friend whom she hasn't seen in years but has an incredible tale to tell her. Starring: Anne Pitoniak, Robert Dryden, Catherine Byers, Joe Silver
671	96	"Fan Mail"	Himan Brown	Sam Dann	June 24, 1977
A tale of husband-and-wife soap opera actors whose show's storyline finds one of their characters killed off, and an overly obsessed fan who can't separate real life from fantasy. Starring: Mandel Kramer, Anne Williams, Teri Keane, Ian Martin, William Griffis
672	97	"Come, Fill My Cup"	Himan Brown	Sam Dann	June 27, 1977
A commuter train conductor recounts how a regular poker game on one train's club car turned into murder by poison. Starring: Larry Haines, William Griffis
673	98	"The Adventure of the Speckled Band"	Himan Brown	Murray Burnett	June 28, 1977
A young heiress hires Sherlock Holmes to find out who killed her sister in a sealed-room murder, and what her sibling's dying words signified. Starring: Kevin McCarthy, Court Benson, Patricia Elliott, Jackson Beck; Adapted from the short story by Arthur Conan Doyle
674	99	"Dead Men Do Tell Tales"	Himan Brown	Ian Martin	June 30, 1977
As a pair of detectives pursue his killer, a dead man recounts how he played conscience for a group of men who committed a horrible act 20 years earlier. Starring: Mason Adams, Howard Ross, Robert Kaliban, Marian Seldes

=== July ===
No. overall	No. in season	Title	Directed by	Written by	Original release date
675	100	"Revenge"	Himan Brown	Percy Granger	July 1, 1977
A wealthy man arrives in an Old West town bent to gain revenge (for startling reasons) on the three men who wronged him many years prior. Starring: Gordon Heath
676	101	"Boomerang"	Himan Brown	Elspeth Eric	July 4, 1977
A young witch enlists the Devil's help in casting spells on the man who continues to spurn her romantic advances — spells that only backfire against her. Starring: Ann Shepherd, Corrine Orr, Michael Wager, Norman Rose
677	102	"Hexed"	Himan Brown	Nancy Moore	July 5, 1977
A newlywed tries to convince her husband to sell their Caribbean plantation and move, all due to her belief that his resentful manservant is trying to put a curse on her. Starring: Roberta Maxwell, Paul Hecht, Ian Martin
678	103	"A Stranger Among Us"	Himan Brown	Elspeth Eric	July 7, 1977
Based on the actual documented story of one "Lisa X," this tale finds a woman arrested for auto theft, but claims she is a victim... of an alien abduction. It takes a parapsychologist and hypnosis to get to what really happened. Starring: Marian Seldes, Court Benson, Lloyd Battista
679	104	"The Gift"	Himan Brown	Sam Dann	July 8, 1977
Rita Holland and Walter Powers pull off the long-planned murder of Rita's husband. Despite their telling the police that a burglar was to blame, Walter begins to think they know he's guilty. Starring: Ralph Bell, Robert Dryden, Evelyn Juster, Sam Gray
680	105	"A Scandal in Bohemia"	Himan Brown	Murray Burnett	July 11, 1977
Sherlock Holmes meets a cunning and deductive equal while seeking to recover a scandalous photo for a Bohemian monarch. Starring: Kevin McCarthy, Court Benson, Marian Seldes, William Griffis; Adapted from the short story by Arthur Conan Doyle
681	106	"The Colonel Chabert"	Himan Brown	Karen Thorsen	July 12, 1977
A supposedly dead French colonel reemerges and tries to recover part of his fortune from his since-remarried wife... who's personally reluctant to do so. Starring: Alexander Scourby, Lori March; Adapted from a story by Honoré de Balzac
682	107	"A Matter of Conscience"	Himan Brown	Arnold Moss	July 14, 1977
Defying his parents who are loyal to the Confederacy, a young Kentuckian joins the Union Army, is sent to spy on a Rebel regiment... and meets an unlikely enemy. Starring: Kristoffer Tabori; Adapted from a story by Ambrose Bierce
683	108	"The Kingdom Below"	Himan Brown	Sam Dann	July 15, 1977
A wealthy American financier and his wife travel to Europe to help their daughter find a husband. The hope is that their daughter will marry an aristocrat, but the man she falls for does not meet her father's approval. Starring: Phyllis Newman, Fred Gwynne, Paul Hecht, Bryna Raeburn, Roger Baron
684	109	"The Bisara of Pooree"	Himan Brown	Sam Dann	July 18, 1977
A British soldier buys a small, mysterious jewelry box that gives him bad luck both before and after it's stolen, but he must steal it back if he is to succeed romantically with the woman he desires. Starring: Paul Hecht; Adapted from a story by Rudyard Kipling
685	110	"The Mysterious Island"	Himan Brown	Ian Martin	July 19, 1977
After escaping a Confederate prison camp via hot air balloon, two Union soldiers and a reporter land on a mysterious island where an unseen benefactor sees to their needs. Starring: Leon Janney, Earl Hammond; Adapted from the novel by Jules Verne
686	111	"Rendezvous with Death"	Himan Brown	Ian Martin	July 21, 1977
A football player with incurable cancer goes mountain climbing and meets a mysterious woman who provides him love and comfort. But he is the only person who knows she exists. Starring: Kristoffer Tabori, Roberta Maxwell, Arnold Moss, Anne Pitoniak, Mandel Kramer
687	112	"The Secret of the Aztecs"	Himan Brown	Percy Granger	July 22, 1977
A ghost instructs a man, stranded in the desert with a broken-down car, to protect an ancient Aztec treasure from a "savage" being. But the man can't convince anyone of what he encountered. Starring: Mason Adams
688	113	"The Adventure of the Blue Carbuncle"	Himan Brown	Murray Burnett	July 25, 1977
A hat and a Christmas goose containing a valuable gemstone send Sherlock Holmes and Dr. Watson on a hunt for who was gifted the goose. Starring: Kevin McCarthy, Court Benson, William Griffis, Lloyd Battista
689	114	"The Rocket's Red Glare"	Himan Brown	Percy Granger	July 26, 1977
A scientist working on a top-secret weapons project takes his own life in full view of his colleagues. But a local cop suspects foul play, and in his investigation runs into a case of espionage. Starring: Mason Adams, Robert Dryden, Catherine Byers, Sam Gray
690	115	"The Secret of Laurels"	Himan Brown	Roy Winsor	July 28, 1977
A man is convicted of killing his best friend but has no memory of committing it; his son and daughter-in-law set out to prove his innocence. Starring: Norman Rose, Don Scardino, Ann Williams, Evelyn Juster
691	116	"The Thousand and First Door"	Himan Brown	Ian Martin	July 29, 1977
A man narrates the final days of his life, revealing that his demise was not so much due to a stroke (as doctors determined) but more due to an uncaring wife and her lover. Starring: Russell Horton, Carol Teitel, Earl Hammond, Jackson Beck

=== August ===
No. overall	No. in season	Title	Directed by	Written by	Original release date
692	117	"Hope Springs Eternal"	Himan Brown	Percy Granger	August 8, 1977
A woman waits 40 years for the return of her fiancé, who disappeared without a trace after exiting their remote cabin. Starring: Court Benson, Anne Williams
693	118	"Case Closed"	Himan Brown	Sam Dann	August 10, 1977
Chester Jones holds up a bank and makes one demand, that the company who fired him from an engineering job rehire him. The lone hostage he's holding, teller Joanna Butler, soon begins to understand that regaining employment may not be all that he really wants. Starring: Mandel Kramer, Evelyn Juster, Joan Shay, Joe Silver, Earl Hammond
694	119	"For Want of a Nail"	Himan Brown	Sam Dann	August 12, 1977
Plane trouble grounds a woman in a North Dakota town that's home to her husband's biggest business client. When she seeks to tour its factory, she learns that the company doesn't exist. Starring: Betsy Palmer, Ian Martin, Robert Dryden, Bryna Raeburn
695	120	"The Together Place"	Himan Brown	Elspeth Eric	August 15, 1977
A country doctor treats a woman who lives with her daughter on a remote island. The daughter has been communicating with a twin sister who lives in another dimension. Starring: Norman Rose, Mary Jane Higby, Marian Seldes, Rosemary Rice
696	121	"In the Fog"	Himan Brown	Roy Winsor	August 17, 1977
Losing direction in foggy weather, a shell-shocked World War I veteran comes to the aid of a woman anxious to meet an appointment. Later, however, the woman turns up dead. Starring: Gordon Gould, Martha Greenhouse, Ian Martin, William Griffis; Adapted from a story by Algernon Blackwood
697	122	"The Instrument"	Himan Brown	Sam Dann	August 19, 1977
A writer retains his incompetent agent's services because the agent saved him from drowning years before. But when he's finally ready to fire him, the writer finds himself in need of his agent's services... again and again. Starring: Ralph Bell, Robert Kaliban, Evelyn Juster
698	123	"Return to Pompeii"	Himan Brown	Victoria Dann	August 22, 1977
Jennifer Matthews and a colleague are traveling Italy when their bus breaks down. The pair spend the night in Pompeii, where Jennifer has a dream of life in the ancient city before its destruction. Starring: Marian Seldes, Patricia Elliott, Paul Hecht, Larry Haines
699	124	"The Adventures of Don Quixote"	Himan Brown	Arnold Moss	August 24, 1977
An adaptation of Miguel de Cervantes' classic novel about a hidalgo and his misadventures against windmills in 15th Century Spain. Starring: Arnold Moss, Larry Haines, Bryna Raeburn, Court Benson
700	125	"Area Thirteen"	Himan Brown	Murray Burnett	August 26, 1977
In 2176 A.D., all children are registered and programmed, through genetic engineering, with personality and skill sets. When one child slips through the registry and is located, it becomes a matter of security. Starring: Mandel Kramer, Ian Martin, Marian Seldes
701	126	"To Be a Rose"	Himan Brown	Sam Dann	August 29, 1977
A man who was once a gentle poet recalls how the woman he loved broke his heart and drove him over the edge enough to commit murder and serve time in a mental asylum. Starring: Paul Hecht, Leon Janney, Catherine Byers, Joan Shay, Earl Hammond
702	127	"The Reunion"	Himan Brown	Percy Granger	August 31, 1977
Ten years to the day after the Normandy landings, an American GI reunites in Paris with a fellow soldier... who, he soon discovers, is leading a Jekyll-and-Hide life. Starring: Paul Hecht, Percy Granger, Mildred Clinton, Sam Gray, William Griffis

=== September ===
No. overall	No. in season	Title	Directed by	Written by	Original release date
703	128	"Olive Darling and Morton Dear"	Himan Brown	Sam Dann	September 2, 1977
A demure accountant heads for a stress-relieving wilderness adventure, sharing a cabin with another man who claims to be a writer but may actually be a murderous robber. Starring: Fred Gwynne, Ralph Bell
704	129	"The Waiting Room"	Himan Brown	Bob Juhren	September 5, 1977
A young couple is cordially invited to a weekend stay at the mansion home of an older couple... whose solicitation hides a sinister intent. Starring: Larry Haines, Marian Seldes, Russell Horton
705	130	"Silent Shock"	Himan Brown	Elspeth Eric	September 7, 1977
A woman in a mental asylum talks to people who aren't there and awaits the return of a beau who does not exist. But is she really insane... or being deliberately destabilized by her keepers? Starring: Mercedes McCambridge
706	131	"The Woman in the Green Dress"	Himan Brown	Roy Winsor	September 9, 1977
A visitor is haunted by a portrait in his friend's residence and an escutcheon in an abandoned church's stained glass window, both of which reference a woman who may have been mysteriously murdered 80 years earlier. Starring: Michael Tolan, Eileen Heckart, Lois Kibbee, Guy Sorel, Earl Hammond
707	132	"First Childhood"	Himan Brown	Sam Dann	September 12, 1977
Her detractors are up for a surprise when a clever yet senile old lady must prove herself mentally competent in order to preserve ownership of her house and her accustomed lifestyle. Starring: Eileen Heckart
708	133	"The Way to Dusty Death"	Himan Brown	Arnold & Stella Moss	September 13, 1977
Two sisters try to reclaim the remains of their father, who was killed on land owned by a baron whose family has long fought with theirs. Despite the sisters' pleas and that of his son, the baron would rather let the body rot. An adaptation of Sophocles' play Antigone set in the Kentucky/West Virginia backwoods in the years after the Civil War. Starring: Arnold Moss, Marian Seldes, Evelyn Juster, Don Scardino, Gilbert Mack
709	134	"Passport to Freedom"	Himan Brown	Ian Martin	September 15, 1977
A husband-and-wife spy team travel behind the Iron Curtain to help a talented scientist and his wife defect. But trouble soon follows when the scientist prefers that his mistress accompany him instead of his wife. Starring: Paul Hecht, Martha Greenhouse, Ian Martin, Bryna Raeburn
710	135	"Death on Project X"	Himan Brown	Victoria Dann	September 16, 1977
A government inspector performs a routine check at a weapons manufacturing facility, and encounters a group of seemingly deranged scientists who say they've developed the ultimate weapon... and plan to use it. Starring: Larry Haines, Robert Dryden, Court Benson, Catherine Byers
711	136	"The Wind and the Flame"	Himan Brown	Sam Dann	September 19, 1977
A blackmailer makes calls to a wealthy industrialist, prompting the maid answering the calls to become suspicious of her employer's past. But the maid may have a mysterious past of her own. Starring: Celeste Holm, Norman Rose, Earl Hammond
712	137	"The Tunnel Man"	Himan Brown	Percy Granger	September 20, 1977
A deranged scientist invents a machine that can easily cut through elemental rock, and uses it to threaten a city with an earthquake lest its government meet his demands. Starring: Ralph Bell, Court Benson, Earl Hammond, Robert Maxwell
713	138	"The Plan"	Himan Brown	Sam Dann	September 22, 1977
A wealthy woman is struck with guilt when she learns that her whimsical desires led to the death of her faithful maid. Starring: Kim Hunter
714	139	"The Burning Whirlwind"	Himan Brown	Ian Martin	September 23, 1977
A naive, aged woman withdraws $8 million cash from her bank account and stashes it in her home. The teller who helped in the transaction recruits an accomplice to con her out of it. Starring: Michael Tolan, Mary Jane Higby, Bryna Raeburn, Ian Martin
715	140	"The Guy de Maupassant Murders"	Himan Brown	Sam Dann	September 26, 1977
An aloof judge and his well-read housekeeper trail a serial killer who preys on young women and leaves next to their bodies tantalizing notes with an oddly familiar writing style. Starring: Fred Gwynne, Marian Seldes, Martha Greenhouse, Nat Polen
716	141	"The Wintering Place"	Himan Brown	Sam Dann	September 27, 1977
An aged widower forces himself sexually on and later murders a young scientist. He is soon haunted by the scientist's spirit, who with that of the man's wife urge him to confess his crime. Starring: Robert Dryden, Evelyn Juster, Earl Hammond
717	142	"The Solitary"	Himan Brown	Elspeth Eric	September 29, 1977
A prison guard befriends an inmate who's locked in solitary confinement and is regularly tormented by another, less-compassionate guard. Starring: Larry Haines, Fred Gwynne, Ralph Bell, Nat Polen
718	143	"Trilby"	Himan Brown	James Agate, Jr.	September 30, 1977
An arrogant hypnotist makes a popular singer out of a depressed young woman... who can't remember her performances while not under the spell. Starring: Marian Seldes, Ian Martin, Mandel Kramer, Gordon Gould

=== October ===
No. overall	No. in season	Title	Directed by	Written by	Original release date
719	144	"Mother Knows Best"	Himan Brown	Sam Dann	October 3, 1977
A down-on-his-luck ex-college football star (and former juvenile delinquent) tries to hit his wealthy uncle up for cash, and he is later widely considered the lead suspect in his murder. Even his mother believes he did it... at first. Starring: Bryna Raeburn, Russell Horton
720	145	"The Sea Nymph"	Himan Brown	Ian Martin	October 5, 1977
A deep-sea diver is commissioned by a greedy antique collector to rescue an ancient statue from an Aegean Sea shipwreck. But the diver finds two other things during the mission: A mysterious inhabitant of the shipwreck, and a beautiful girl under the collector's care. Starring: Norman Rose, Paul Hecht, Jada Rowland
721	146	"The Adventure of the Beryl Coronet"	Himan Brown	Murray Burnett	October 7, 1977
A financier red-handedly catches his son stealing jewels from an ancient ornamental crown that was left in his care as loan collateral. Sherlock Holmes is called on to obtain a confession, and soon finds that silence reveals a whole lot more than words. Starring: Kevin McCarthy, Court Benson, Russell Horton, Catherine Byers; Adapted from the short story by Arthur Conan Doyle
722	147	"The Actress"	Himan Brown	Elspeth Eric	October 10, 1977
A stage thespian obsesses with the part she is playing, the mythological Greek character Medea, to the point that she slowly loses her own sense of self and takes on Medea's traits. Starring: Tammy Grimes
723	148	"The Case of Chateau-Margaux"	Himan Brown	James Agate, Jr.	October 12, 1977
An adaptation of the Edgar Allan Poe tale of a wealthy man's disappearance; his horse, who was the only witness; his ne're-do-well nephew, who is arrested for the crime; and a case of expensive wine that may be the link to identifying the real culprit. Starring: Jackson Beck, William Griffis, Robert Dryden, Lloyd Battista
724	149	"The People of Sissora"	Himan Brown	Sam Dann	October 14, 1977
A man spots another in a restaurant diner and pins him down as a threat to the world. The question is... which world? Starring: Ralph Bell, Evelyn Juster, William Griffis
725	150	"Return Engagement"	Himan Brown	James Agate, Jr.	October 17, 1977
Once a famed Shakespearian actor, Roy Rayburn now has no qualms about committing petty thefts and other mischief. But does his heart also harbor thoughts of murder? Starring: Fred Gwynne
726	151	"The Island on Silvertree Lake"	Himan Brown	Victoria Dann	October 19, 1977
After a back-road car accident, a woman is forced to catch a short boat ride to an island resort... where she finds herself imprisoned within mysterious circumstances. Starring: Patricia Elliott, Lloyd Battista, Teri Keane, Earl Hammond
727	152	"Sorry to Let You Go"	Himan Brown	Ian Martin	October 21, 1977
This tale of technology as governance finds computers determining that a middle-aged man is too old to be productive; when he tries to kill himself for the life insurance money, another computer prevents him from doing so. Starring: Mandel Kramer
728	153	"Trial for Murder"	Himan Brown	James Agate, Jr.	October 24, 1977
After two murder mystery writers are empaneled on a murder trial's jury, they encounter victim's ghost, who aims to ensure his killer's guilt. Starring: Paul Hecht, Earl Hammond, Court Benson, Robert Maxwell; Adapted from a short story by Charles Dickens
729	154	"Just to Keep Busy"	Himan Brown	Sam Dann	October 25, 1977
A betrothed man starts courting his best friend's secretary... who takes drastic action when she learns of his double game. Starring: Robert Dryden, Judy Lewis, Larry Haines, Evelyn Juster
730	155	"The House by the Seine"	Himan Brown	Ian Martin	October 27, 1977
A famous actress and former French Underground member receives a recently-fired pistol in the mail; when the firearm is later used to frame her for her lover's murder, she must use every ounce of her talents and wit to discover the real killer's identity. Starring: Marian Seldes
731	156	"A Question of Identity"	Himan Brown	Roy Winsor	October 28, 1977
A young jewel trader awakens in a hotel room to find out his identity has been stolen. He is certain it's due to a conspiracy to steal the valuable diamonds in his possession. Starring: Russell Horton
732	157	"Trial by Fire"	Himan Brown	Nancy Moore	October 31, 1977
A con artist uses technology to convince a primitive tribe that he's their fire god's appointed messiah, and that their valuable jeweled crown be given to him. The swindle goes perfectly... until the fire god himself shows up! Starring: Norman Rose, Michael Tolan, Evelyn Juster

=== November ===
No. overall	No. in season	Title	Directed by	Written by	Original release date
733	158	"Last Train Out"	Himan Brown	Ian Martin	November 1, 1977
An American film crew documenting the last run of the Orient Express to Istanbul are kidnapped after stumbling on a communist espionage plot. Starring: Anne Williams, Robert Dryden, Earl Hammond, Ian Martin
734	159	"Land of the Living Dead"	Himan Brown	Arnold Moss	November 3, 1977
While searching for a remote Brazilian village, two scientists find themselves stranded at an airport in another village — a strange locale populated by a diverse and ritualistic tribe. Starring: Don Scardino, Russell Horton
735	160	"The Final Judgement"	Himan Brown	Sam Dann	November 4, 1977
Three merchants seek the wisdom and counsel of the legendary King Solomon, who employs a unique strategy to determine which among the trio is a thief. Starring: Gordon Heath, Bryna Raeburn, Ralph Bell, Nat Polen, Roger DeKoven
736	161	"The Therapeutic Cat"	Himan Brown	Elspeth Eric	November 7, 1977
Lonely and desperate for company, an elderly man adopts a cat... which possesses a literally bewitching insight into the human male. Starring: Fred Gwynne, Paul Hecht, Bryna Raeburn, Jada Rowland
737	162	"The Haunted Mill"	Himan Brown	James Agate, Jr.	November 8, 1977
While Dr. James Patmore travels overseas, the woman he loves falls for another man. When Patmore returns, she falls for him all over again, angering the new suitor. Starring: Ralph Bell, Russell Horton
738	163	"A Tale of Two Worlds"	Himan Brown	Ian Martin	November 10, 1977
A soap opera actor becomes so involved with the role he plays that he's inconsolable when his character is killed off, necessitating his castmates to try reasoning with the show's arrogant producer over the plot twist. Starring: Robert Kaliban, Ian Martin, Augusta Dabney, Robert Dryden
739	164	"We Meet Again"	Himan Brown	Sam Dann	November 11, 1977
A detective's wife is certain that the murderer her husband has just apprehended — who also happens to be her first love — is innocent. So she sets out to prove the man's innocence... with her husband's help. Starring: Teri Keane, Catherine Byers, Larry Haines, Earl Hammond, Lloyd Battista
740	165	"The Gloria Scott"	Himan Brown	Ralph Goodman	November 14, 1977
Sherlock Holmes uses his powers of deduction on a case of high-seas mutiny aboard an ill-fated ship, a key clue being a coded message. Starring: Kevin McCarthy, William Griffis, Court Benson, Paul Hecht; Adapted from a short story by Arthur Conan Doyle
741	166	"A Point of Time"	Himan Brown	Victoria Dann	November 15, 1977
In 2057, with Gen. Franklyn Ulysses Morgan savagely ruling all of North America, Dr. Otto Segrim and his sister, Leta, concoct a plan to send Morgan into the past and give him the chance to become more compassionate. Starring: Norman Rose, Jackson Beck, Ralph Bell, Evelyn Juster
742	167	"Hunted Down"	Himan Brown	James Agate, Jr.	November 17, 1977
When a man's sweetheart is murdered in an insurance fraud scam, he vows to catch the killer and bring him to justice. Starring: Gordon Heath; Adapted from a story by Charles Dickens
743	168	"A Grain of Salt"	Himan Brown	Sam Dann	November 18, 1977
A young Irish woman living in America asks a cop to help find her lost purse. Among the purse's contents: A magical salt shaker, acquired by her father from a mystical "Old Man of the Stone" in her homeland. Starring: Teri Keane, Fred Gwynne
744	169	"She"	Himan Brown	Roy Winsor	November 21, 1977
An explorer and the son of his late colleague travel to a remote island to find a mythic goddess who killed the young man's ancestors. But they also find an ancient — and vengeful — queen. Starring: Gordon Gould, Gordon Heath; Adapted from the novel by H. Rider Haggard
745	170	"The Pinkerton Method"	Himan Brown	James Agate, Jr.	November 23, 1977
The story of the origins of the legendary Pinkerton Detective Agency, which started by pursuing train robbers in Missouri who killed an innocent railway worker. Starring: Ian Martin, Lloyd Battista
746	171	"Indian Giver"	Himan Brown	Sam Dann	November 25, 1977
Believing her estate is apparently haunted by a ghost that drives away her guests and hired help, an elderly old woman hires an affable private detective to help her solve the problem. Starring: Fred Gwynne, Mary Jane Higby, Robert Dryden, Bryna Raeburn
747	172	"The Man is Missing"	Himan Brown	Elspeth Eric	November 28, 1977
A detective obliges a woman's request to find her missing husband. As he finds himself becoming attracted to the woman, his wife takes interest in the case as well... and what she uncovers is astonishing. Starring: Anne Williams, Larry Haines
748	173	"The Teddy Bear"	Himan Brown	James Agate, Jr.	November 30, 1977
A reporter investigates a Soviet plan to read and control the thoughts of others through the use of a satellite. Starring: Michael Wager

=== December ===
No. overall	No. in season	Title	Directed by	Written by	Original release date
749	174	"Neatness Counts"	Himan Brown	Sam Dann	December 2, 1977
An investigator must work a murder mystery where the victim was so despised that everyone he knew in his lifetime could be a suspect. Starring: Ralph Bell, Joan Shea, Robert Maxwell, Evie Juster, Earl Hammond
750	175	"The Lost Tomorrows"	Himan Brown	Stella Moss	December 5, 1977
A pair of American cave explorers plan an expedition to retrieve rare artifacts from a Yucatán cavern, despite warnings from the locals that no one should trespass on the sacred site. Starring: Mandel Kramer, Ann Williams
751	176	"Fire and Ice"	Himan Brown	Sam Dann	December 7, 1977
A father and daughter have differing ideas over which of two men she should marry, leading the father to arrange a grueling expedition to reveal the suitors' true characters. Starring: Fred Gwynne, Marian Hailey
752	177	"This Time Around"	Himan Brown	Sam Dann	December 9, 1977
Kenneth B. Sturgis is a businessman struggling to save both his career and his marriage. But his mind lapses into visions of medieval battle, so much so that "Sir Kenneth" takes over his mind completely. Starring: Gordon Heath
753	178	"The Ten Million Dollar Heist"	Himan Brown	James Agate, Jr.	December 12, 1977
In 1876, two old-pro burglars and a well-meaning youngster attempt to pull off the biggest bank heist ever. Starring: Joe Silver, Robert Dryden, Skip Hinnant
754	179	"The Death Shot"	Himan Brown	Ian Martin	December 14, 1977
A honeymoon in Greece turns nightmarish for a newlywed couple after the husband, by chance, photographs a murder committed by a prominent political figure. Starring: Anne Williams, Court Benson, Jason Beck, Michael Tolan
755	180	"The Ghost with a Knife"	Himan Brown	James Agate, Jr.	December 16, 1977
Supposedly based on true events, this tale chronicles a family threatened by a knife-wielding spirit and the paranormal investigators who attempt to communicate with the ghost to understand his bizarre behavior. Starring: Arnold Moss, Patricia Elliott
756	181	"Brothers of the Angle"	Himan Brown	Sam Dann	December 19, 1977
The wealthy Henrietta Augusta Buttweiser is certain her late husband is trying to reach her from beyond the grave. A duo of con artists set out to use the deceased's peculiarities (namely those involving fishing) to gain Mrs. Buttweiser's trust — and her money. Starring: Joan Shea, Evie Juster, Ralph Bell
757	182	"The Big Ten-Cent Hustle"	Himan Brown	Sam Dann	December 21, 1977
A rare, shiny mercury dime tells the story of its own circulation and the people who possessed it. Starring: Earl Hammond
758	183	"The Witching Well"	Himan Brown	Ian Martin	December 23, 1977
After learning in a letter from his late father that payments must continue to be made to a certain woman in Branwell, Ireland, Patrick Kinsella travels to Branwell to meet the recipient, who reluctantly tells Patrick of the dark heritage the town and his family share. Starring: Paul Hecht, Carol Teitel, Ian Martin
759	184	"The Ghosts of Yesterday"	Himan Brown	Victoria Dann	December 26, 1977
Wealthy socialite Marge Stafford is asked by a Nazi hunter to identify the man responsible for the death of her family and the destruction of their village in a World War II pogrom. But she's more concerned about how the revelation of her dark past will hurt her social standing in the present. Starring: Teri Keane
760	185	"The Missouri Kid"	Himan Brown	James Agate, Jr.	December 28, 1977
A Pinkerton detective is murdered in cold blood, and his brother vows to vengefully pursue and kill the notorious criminal who's responsible, in this tale based on a true-life incident. Starring: Lloyd Battista
761	186	"The Ninth Volume"	Himan Brown	Percy Granger	December 30, 1977
In 1998, an oil company geologist obsesses over an archaeological discovery buried in the Rocky Mountains for 12 billion years: A fully furnished, modern-style house, and a multi-book set of world history chronicles — with a missing volume that tells of history to come. Starring: Michael Wager, Court Benson, Robert Dryden

== Sources ==
- Payton, Gordon; Grams, Martin Jr. (January 1999), The CBS radio mystery theater: an episode guide and handbook to nine years of broadcasting, 1974-1982, McFarland & Company, Inc., ISBN 0-7864-0559-7
