= Gloria Dickson =

American actress (1917–1945)

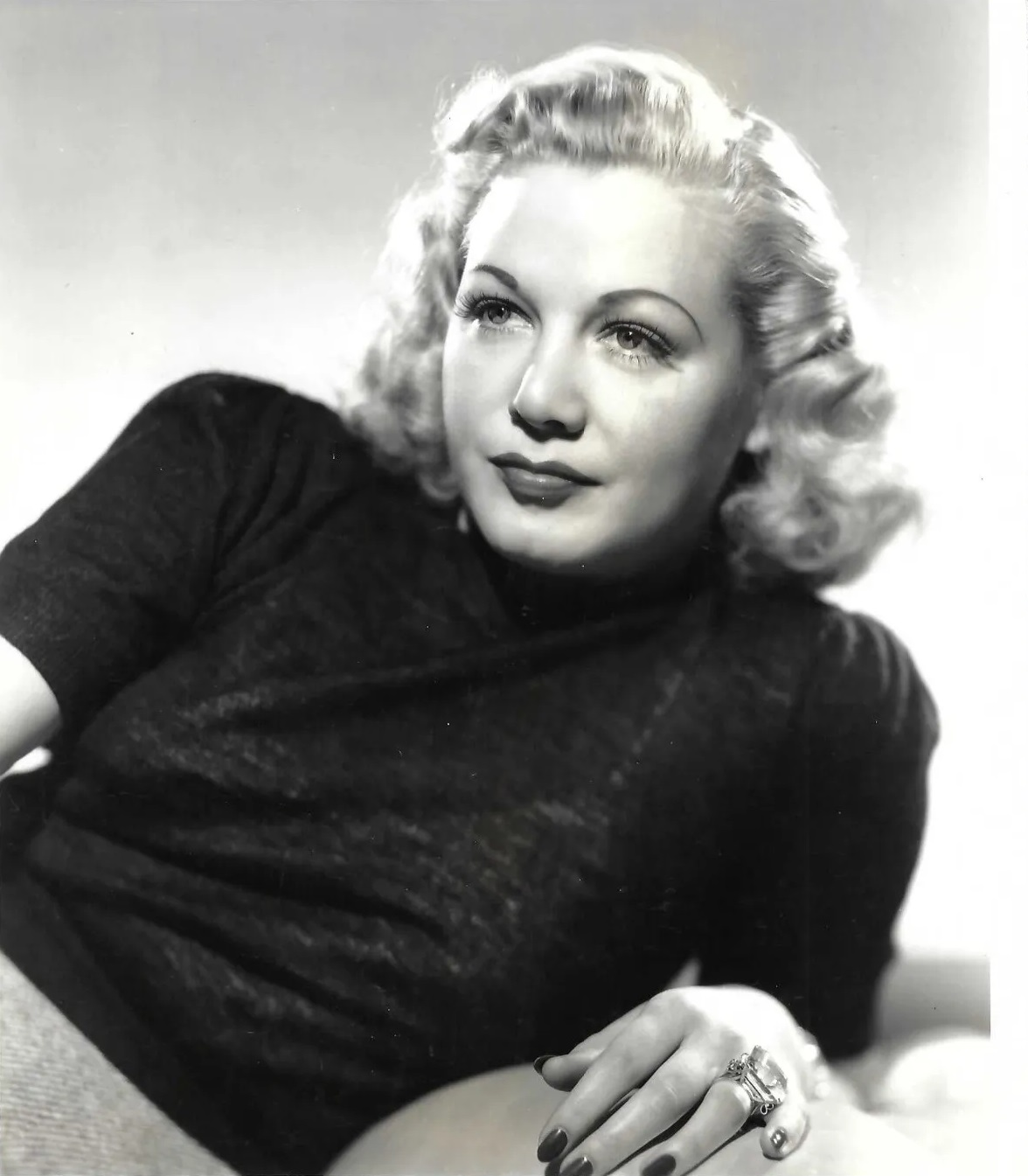
- Dickson, circa 1940s
- Born: Thais Alalia Dickerson; August 13, 1917; Pocatello, Idaho, U.S.
- Died: April 10, 1945 (aged 27); Los Angeles, California, U.S.
- Resting place: Hollywood Forever Cemetery
- Occupation: Actress
- Years active: 1937–1945
- Spouses: Perc Westmore (m. 1938; div. 1941) Ralph Murphy (m. 1941; div. 1944) William Fitzgerald (m. 1944)

Gloria Dickson (born Thais Alalia Dickerson; August 13, 1917 – April 10, 1945) was an American stage and screen actress of the 1930s and 1940s.

== Early years ==
Born in Pocatello, Idaho, Dickson was the daughter of a banker. After her father's death in 1929, the family moved to California. She graduated from Long Beach Polytechnic High School.

She began acting during high school in amateur theatre productions.

== Career ==
In April 1936, as she worked in a production of the Federal Theatre Project, she was spotted by Warner Bros. talent scout Max Arnow, who signed her to a contract. Her film debut was in 1937's They Won't Forget.

== Personal life ==
Dickson was married to the famous makeup artist Perc Westmore on June 20, 1938, in Santa Barbara, California, then filed suit for divorce from him on May 17, 1940. Their uncontested divorce was granted on June 22, 1941, in Los Angeles, California.

Her second marriage, in late 1941, was to film director Ralph Murphy, whom she divorced in 1944.

Later in 1944, she married William Fitzgerald, a former boxer to whom she remained married until her death at age 27 on April 10, 1945.

== Death ==
Dickson died during a fire on April 10, 1945, at the Los Angeles home she was renting from actor Sidney Toler, caused by an unextinguished cigarette that ignited an overstuffed chair on the main floor, while she slept upstairs. Her body, and that of her pet dog, were found in the bathroom, and she is assumed to have attempted to escape through the bathroom window. She died from asphyxiation; flames had seared her lungs, and her body had suffered first- and second-degree burns.

== Partial filmography ==
- They Won't Forget (1937) - Sybil Hale
- Talent Scout (1937) - Blonde on Bus (uncredited)
- Gold Diggers in Paris (1938) - Mona Verdivere
- Racket Busters (1938) - Nora Jordan
- Secrets of an Actress (1938) - Carla Orr
- Heart of the North (1938) - Joyce MacMillan
- They Made Me a Criminal (1939) - Peggy
- Waterfront (1939) - Ann Stacey
- The Cowboy Quarterback (1939) - Evelyn Corey
- No Place to Go (1939) - Gertrude Plummer
- On Your Toes (1939) - Peggy Porterfield
- Private Detective (1939) - Mona Lannon
- King of the Lumberjacks (1940) - Tina Martin Deribault
- Tear Gas Squad (1940) - Jerry Sullivan
- I Want a Divorce (1940) - Wanda Holland
- This Thing Called Love (1940) - Florence Bertrand
- The Big Boss (1941) - Sue Peters
- Mercy Island (1941) - Leslie Ramsey
- The Affairs of Jimmy Valentine (1942) - Cleo Arden
- Power of the Press (1943) - Edwina Stephens
- Lady of Burlesque (1943) - Dolly Baxter
- The Crime Doctor's Strangest Case (1943) - Mrs. Keppler / Evelyn Fenton Cartwright
- Rationing (1944) - Miss McCue (final film role)

== Stage credits ==
- Wise Tomorrow (1937)
