= Alias Jimmy Valentine (radio program) =

1938-1939 old-time radio crime drama

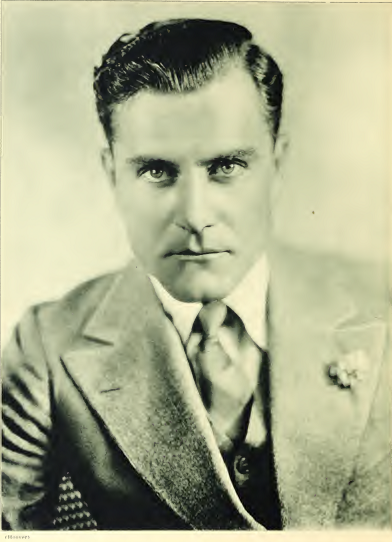
- Bert Lytell starred as Jimmy Valentine (1918 photo)
- Genre: Crime drama
- Running time: 15 minutes
- Country of origin: United States
- Language(s): English
- Syndicates: NBC-Blue
- Starring: Bert Lytell; James Meighan
- Announcer: Dick Joy
- Written by: Doris Halman
- Produced by: Frank and Anne Hummert
- Narrated by: Ford Bond
- Original release: January 18, 1938 – February 27, 1939
- Other themes: If I Should Love You
- Sponsored by: Edgeworth Tobacco; Dr. Lyon's Tooth Powder

Alias Jimmy Valentine is an old-time radio crime drama in the United States. It was broadcast on NBC-Blue January 18, 1938 - February 27, 1939.

== Format ==
The concept for Alias Jimmy Valentine came from writer O. Henry in his short story "A Retrieved Reformation". That story was adapted into the 1909 play Alias Jimmy Valentine by Paul Armstrong.

The program's stories focused on Lee Randall, described by Jim Cox in his book, Radio Crime Fighters: More Than 300 Programs from the Golden Age as "an ex-con and reformed safecracker [who] applied his talents and enormous underworld contacts to abet the forces of law and order". While doing so, he became an honest bank clerk and fell in love with the daughter of the banker.

== Producers ==
The series was produced by Frank and Anne Hummert, who were described by Jim Cox in his book, Frank and Anne Hummert's Radio Factory: The Programs and Personalities of Broadcasting's Most Prolific Producers as "the most prolific creatives in eight decades of broadcast history". They originated more than 100 radio series, about half of which were soap operas.

Cox wrote that Alias Jimmy Valentine episodes raised "the never-to-be-resolved query: 'Can a protagonist go straight and overcome his impasse?'" That query, Cox wrote, "was true formulaic Hummert".

== Personnel ==
Bert Lytell and James Meighan each played the lead at different times. William Bennett Kilpack and Earle Latimore also appeared on the program.

Dick Joy was the announcer. Doris Halman was the writer. Ford Bond narrated.

== See also ==
- Alias Jimmy Valentine (1915 film)
- Alias Jimmy Valentine (1920 film)
- Alias Jimmy Valentine (1928 film)
