= Alias Jimmy Valentine (1920 film) =

1920 American film

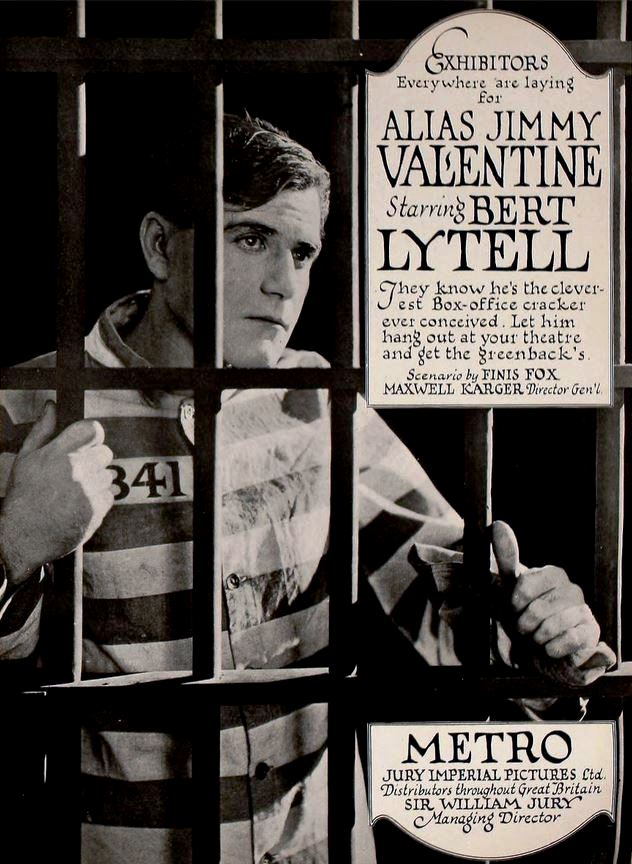
- Ad for the film
- Directed by: Edmund Mortimer; Arthur D. Ripley
- Written by: Finis Fox
- Based on: Alias Jimmy Valentine by Paul Armstrong
- Produced by: Maxwell Karger
- Starring: Bert Lytell
- Cinematography: Sol Polito
- Edited by: Edward M. McDermott
- Distributed by: Metro Pictures
- Release date: April 14, 1920
- Running time: 6 reels
- Country: United States
- Language: Silent film (English intertitles)

Alias Jimmy Valentine is a 1920 American silent crime drama film starring Bert Lytell, directed by Edmund Mortimer and Arthur Ripley, and released through Metro Pictures.

The film was based on the 1909 stage play Alias Jimmy Valentine by Paul Armstrong, which in turn was based on the 1903 short story "A Retrieved Reformation" by O. Henry. An earlier version of the play was filmed in 1915, and a later version, also called Alias Jimmy Valentine (1928) and starring William Haines, was produced by Metro-Goldwyn-Mayer.

== Plot ==
Based upon a review in a film magazine, Jimmy Valentine, a prisoner in Sing Sing for safe-cracking, although guilty, maintains his innocence. When he obtains a pardon, he goes straight, influenced by a beautiful girl. He assumes a new identity as Lee Randall and diligently works at a bank for three years. When he is about to get married, Detective Doyle comes to town with proof of Valentine's guilt. However, the Randall identity is complete, and just as the detective is convinced and about to leave, word comes that a little girl is trapped in the bank safe and no one has the combination. Although the detective is nearby, Valentine uses his skills to open the safe, knowing that it will give away his identity. After the girl is rescued, the detective decides to leave without arresting Valentine.

== Cast ==
- Bert Lytell - Lee Randall/Jimmy Valentine
- Vola Vale - Rose Lane
- Eugene Pallette - 'Red' Jocelyn
- Wilton Taylor - Detective Doyle
- Marc Robbins - Bill Avery
- Robert Dunbar - Lt. Gov. Fay
- Winter Hall - William Lane
- Jim Farley - Cotton

== Preservation status ==
This 1920 film is now considered a lost film.

== See also ==
- Alias Jimmy Valentine (radio program)
