= Alias Jimmy Valentine (1928 film) =

1928 film by Jack Conway

Jimmy Valentine
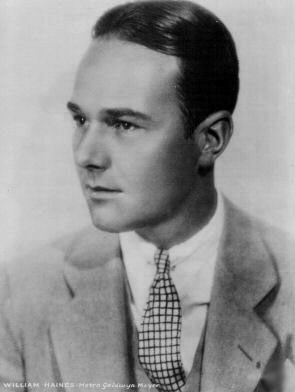
- Publicity still of William Haines released for the film
- Directed by: Jack Conway
- Written by: Sarah Y. Mason; A. P. Younger (adaptation); Joseph Farnham (intertitles)
- Based on: Alias Jimmy Valentine by Paul Armstrong
- Starring: Lionel Barrymore; William Haines
- Cinematography: Merritt Gerstad
- Edited by: Sam Zimbalist
- Music by: William Axt
- Production company: Metro-Goldwyn-Mayer
- Distributed by: Loew's Inc. (Note: Loews was the parent company of MGM.)
- Release date: November 15, 1928 (United States)
- Running time: 88 minutes
- Country: United States
- Languages: Sound (Part-Talkie); English Dialogue and Intertitles

Alias Jimmy Valentine is a 1928 American sound part-talkie crime drama film directed by Jack Conway and starring William Haines, Leila Hyams, Lionel Barrymore, and Karl Dane. The film features talking sequences along with a synchronized musical score with sound effects using both the sound-on-disc and sound-on-film process. The film is based on the 1909 play Alias Jimmy Valentine by Paul Armstrong, which itself was based on an O. Henry short story. The play toured in travelling production companies making it extremely popular. It was revived on Broadway in 1921. Two previous film adaptations had been produced at the old Metro Studios. A 1915 film version was directed by Maurice Tourneur and a 1920 version starring Bert Lytell was directed by Edmund Mortimer and Arthur Ripley.

Released on November 15, 1928, the film was Metro-Goldwyn-Mayer's first partially talking film. It was completed as a silent film before Irving Thalberg sent back Lionel Barrymore and William Haines to repeat their performances for the last two reels with sound.

The film was shot in the middle of the night to avoid ambient noise infiltrating the soundtrack. Haines described the discomfort of working with sound: "You are confined to working quarters... that are almost airtight. You can hardly breathe, and in the hot weather it's like working in a boiler room... The sweat rolled off me until I could hardly stand it, and once I nearly felt like fainting".

== Plot ==
Jimmy Valentine (William Haines) is a slick, highly skilled safecracker with a reputation as one of the best in the business. Operating alongside his devoted but dimwitted partner Swede (Karl Dane), Jimmy is lured into planning a major bank heist with the help of the shady and ruthless criminal Avery (Tully Marshall) and other underworld figures. Jimmy, however, remains something of a rogue with a conscience—his charm and swagger hint at more than just criminal instinct.

As the crew scopes out a new job, they take lodging near a small-town bank. It is there that Jimmy meets Rose Lane (Leila Hyams), the sweet and intelligent daughter of the local bank president, Mr. Lane (Howard C. Hickman). Jimmy is instantly smitten by her honesty, dignity, and innocence—qualities entirely absent from the world he comes from. In Rose, he sees a life he never knew he wanted.

Falling genuinely in love, Jimmy makes a bold decision: he leaves the criminal world behind. Assuming the alias “Lee Randall,” he reinvents himself as a respectable man, and decides to settle in Rose's town. The transformation is sincere. Under this new identity, Jimmy becomes a trusted community member and employee of the very bank he once considered robbing.

But not everyone is convinced by his sudden change. Detective Doyle (Lionel Barrymore), a seasoned and relentless investigator who has been on Jimmy's trail for years, suspects that the man calling himself “Randall” is none other than the elusive Valentine. Doyle comes to town, quietly observing and gathering evidence. His instincts tell him that Jimmy is hiding something—but his moral compass begins to shift as he sees the man's conduct and the depth of his love for Rose.

As Jimmy prepares to marry Rose and leave his past behind completely, tragedy strikes. During a visit to the bank, a young girl—Bobby's sister (played by Evelyn Mills), the child of a local family—is accidentally locked inside the vault, which is set to automatically time-lock for the night. The vault cannot be opened by conventional means, and the girl's life is at stake.

Jimmy is faced with a harrowing choice: either maintain his new identity and let the child suffocate, or reveal his criminal skill and open the vault, exposing himself in the process. He makes the only moral choice—he cracks the safe with expert precision and rescues the child, while townspeople look on in astonishment.

Doyle, witnessing the event, now has the proof he needs to arrest Jimmy Valentine. But instead of turning him in, Doyle chooses to let him go, recognizing that Jimmy has truly reformed. The act of saving the child is seen as the final evidence of Jimmy's redemption. The detective quietly destroys any remaining evidence linking Randall to the Valentine case.

In the final moments of the film, Jimmy and Rose remain together, with the truth of his past now known only to them and Doyle. Jimmy's journey from criminal to citizen is complete—not through punishment, but through love, choice, and self-sacrifice.

== Cast ==
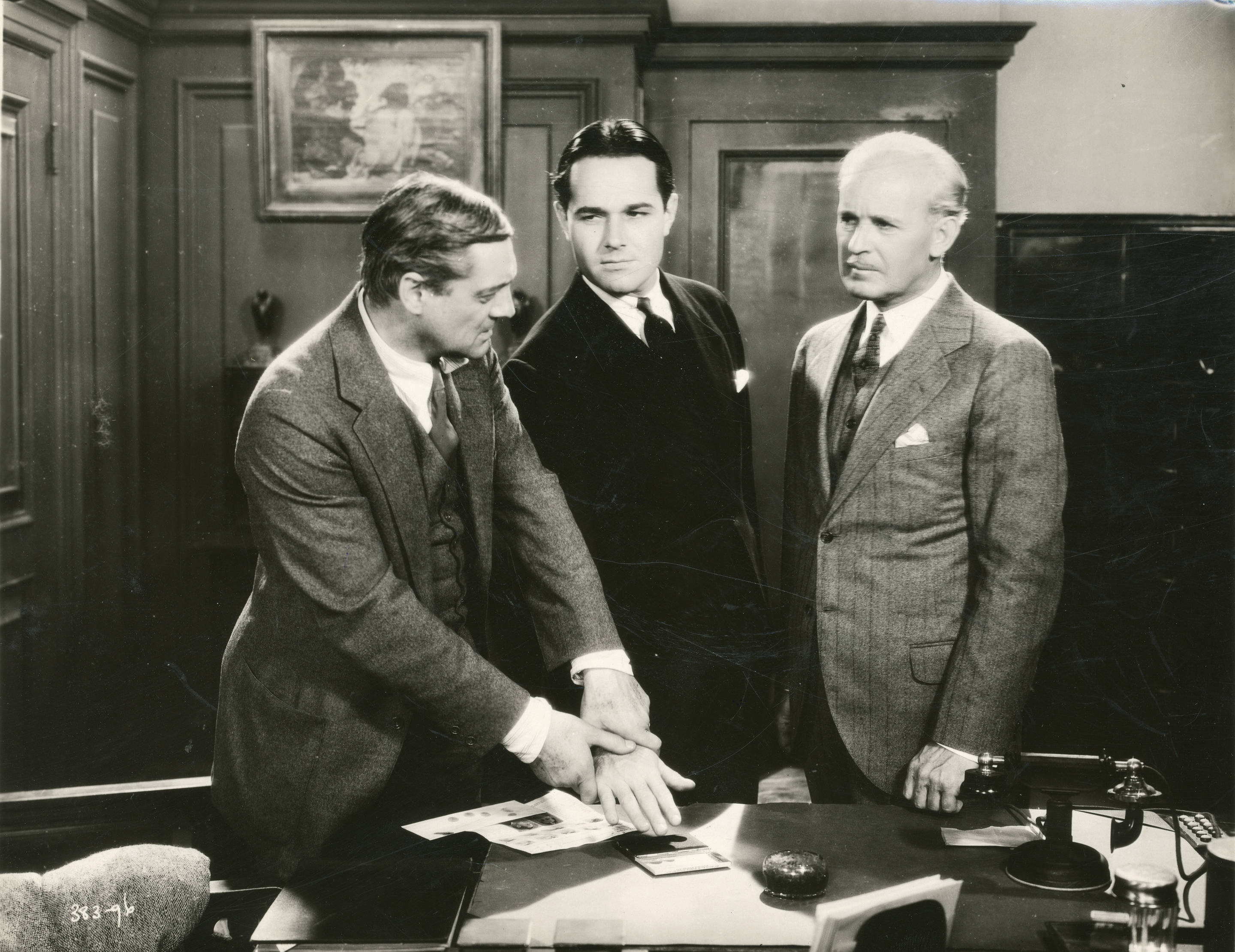
Scene from Alias Jimmy Valentine

- William Haines as Jimmy Valentine
- Lionel Barrymore as Doyle
- Leila Hyams as Rose
- Karl Dane as Swedeas
- Tully Marshall as Avery
- Howard C. Hickman as Mr. Lane
- Billy Butts as Bobby
- Evelyn Mills as Little Sister
- Dolores Brinkman as Chorus girl
- Johnny Hines in a bit part

== Music ==
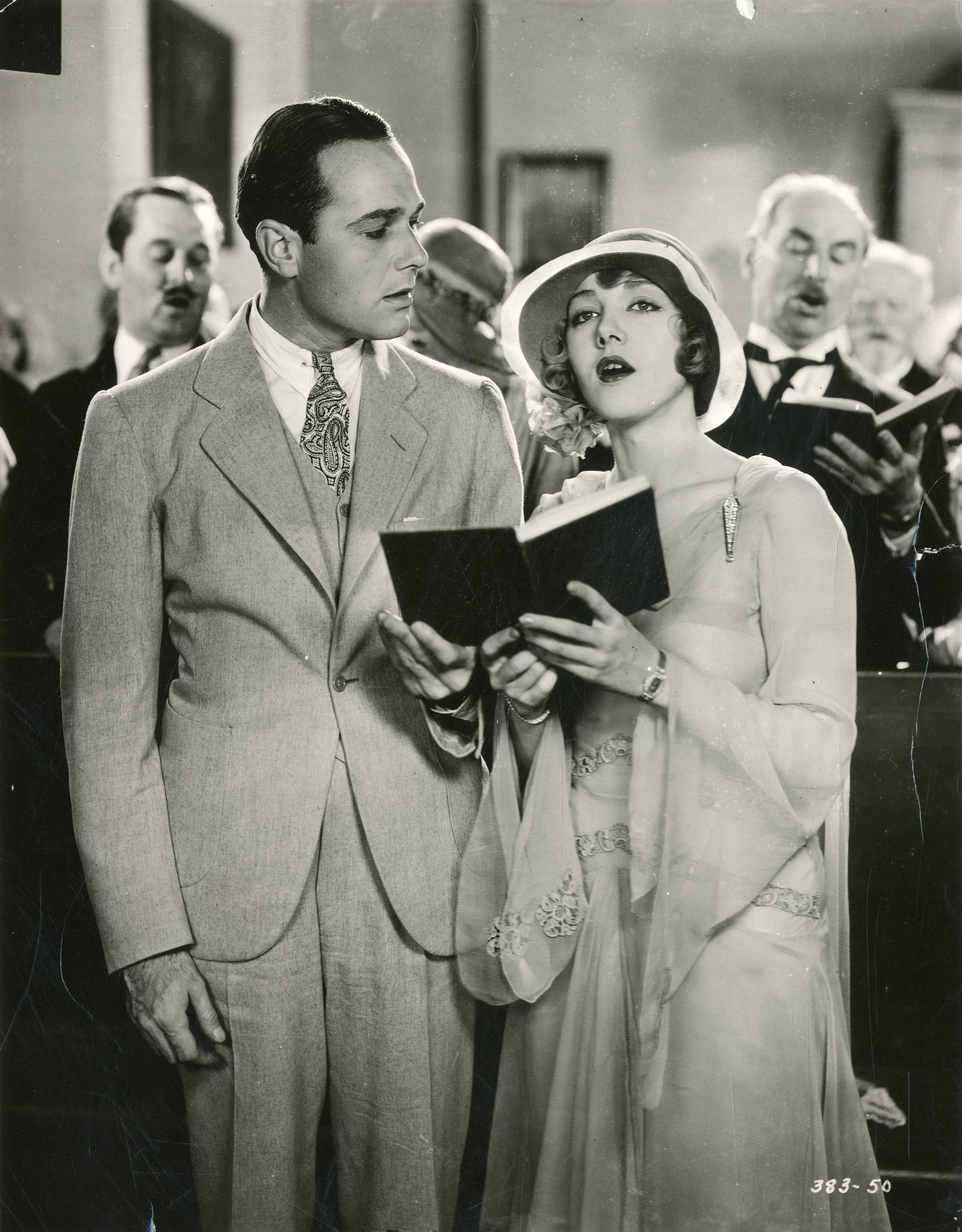
Scene from Alias Jimmy Valentine

The film featured a theme song entitled "Love Dreams" which was composed by William Axt, David Mendoza, Mort Harris and Raymond Klages. An additional song featured on the soundtrack was entitled "Think Of Me Thinking Of You" was composed by Charlie Abbott, Johnny Marvin & Dale Wimbrow. An old comedy song, entitled "Jimmy Valentine" (composed by Madden/Edwards in 1910), was recorded by Nat Shilkret and his Orchestra, with vocals by Billy Murray & Chorus in 1928 and associated with the film on the record label but this song does not appear in the actual film soundtrack.

== Preservation status ==
The full film is now considered lost, but a silent French 9.5mm abridgement, which condenses the film's original ten-reels to four, exists in a private collection. Parts of the soundtrack survive on Vitaphone disks.

== See also ==
- List of early sound feature films (1926–1929)
- List of lost films
- Lionel Barrymore filmography
- Alias Jimmy Valentine, radio program
