= The Affairs of Jimmy Valentine =

1942 film directed by Bernard Vorhaus

- Directed by: Bernard Vorhaus
- Written by: Paul Armstrong Jr. (story); Olive Cooper; Robert Tasker
- Produced by: Leonard Fields (associate producer)
- Starring: Dennis O'Keefe; Ruth Terry; Gloria Dickson
- Cinematography: John Alton
- Edited by: Howard O'Neill
- Music by: Mort Glickman; Samuel Kaylin
- Production company: Republic Pictures
- Distributed by: Republic Pictures
- Release date: March 27, 1942 (United States)
- Running time: 72 minutes 53 minutes (edited version)
- Country: United States
- Language: English

The Affairs of Jimmy Valentine is a 1942 American comedy crime film directed by Bernard Vorhaus and starring Dennis O'Keefe, Ruth Terry, and Gloria Dickson.

The film is also known as Unforgotten Crime (American TV title) and Find Jimmy Valentine. The original film was cut to 53 minutes due to its B-movie billing and later for television. The film was based on the 1910 play, Alias Jimmy Valentine, by Paul Armstrong.

== Plot ==
To boost listener ratings, radio personality Mike Jason encourages sponsors, of his murder mystery radio show, to offer a reward to anyone who can locate safe cracker Jimmy Valentine, who is reportedly retired. The reward for the person who finds the legendary gentleman burglar is set to $10,000.

There's little tough guy Mousey, who becomes over zealous over the possibility of winning the reward. Valentine is rumored to have thrown down his hat in a picturesque small town called Fernville in Illinois. Jason and co-worker Cleo Arden lead the hunt, together with Mousey, and it takes them to the small and previously quiet town.

The search begins in the small town's local newspaper, where Jason hopes to find some old files that can reveal Jimmy Valentine's whereabouts. Jason meets the daughter of the newspaper editor, Bonnie Forbes, who takes him to see her father, Tom Forbes.

It turns out Tom isn't willing to help out in the search for Valentine. But Bonnie has taken a romantic interest in Jason, and offers to help out. She takes the party to Tom's gardener, Pinky, who she has heard tell stories about Valentine in the past.

The lead is a dead end, as Pinky claims to know nothing about Valentine of use to Jason. But when Jason and Mousey visits the Forbes' house, Mousey finds Pinky rummaging about in Tom's office, destroying old files, and there is a photo of Pinky when he was younger, where his hair color matches the color of Valentine's side kick back in the day.

Mousey turns out to be the son of an infamous mobster who was framed by Valentine, and kills Pinky to revenge his father. When Jason finds out about the killing, he suspects Valentine of being the murderer. He goes about town to collect fingerprints of important persons, and stirs up the whole town, since they are all ex-convicts, having settled down in this peaceful place to live a quiet law-abiding life.

The fingerprints are stored in a safe at the sheriff's office, and Jason plans to ambush Valentine and catch him red-handed when he tries to crack the safe open to get hold of the prints. Just as planned, Jason catches Tom, who turns out to be Jimmy Valentine, as he breaks the safe. In an effort to save the rest of the town from being caught, Tom wants to give Jason his prints in exchange for all the others'.

Mousey enters the scene and tries to get his revenge on Tom/Jimmy. Mousey manages to kill himself, and Jason realizes that Tom/Jimmy wasn't the one who killed Pinky. Jason tells the police that Pinky was Jimmy Valentine in disguise, thus saving Tom and his daughter from ruin. Then Jason decides to stay in the small town with Bonnie.

== Cast ==
- Dennis O'Keefe as Mike Jason
- Ruth Terry as Bonnie Forbes
- Gloria Dickson as Cleo Arden
- Roman Bohnen as Tom Forbes / Jimmy Valentine
- George E. Stone as Mousey
- Spencer Charters as Cheevers Snow
- William B. Davidson as Cyrus Ballard
- Roscoe Ates as Dan Kady
- Bobby Larson as Mickey Forbes
- Joe Cunningham as Charles Stanton
- Harry Shannon as Pinky
- Jed Prouty as Maxwell B. Titus
- Patsy Parsons as Marlene Titus
- Linda Brent as Letitia Hinkle
- Wade Boteler as Warden Carl Jones
- Emmett Vogan as District Attorney
- Ray Erlenborn as Sound Effects Man
- Olaf Hytten as Butler
- Lois Collier as Receptionist
- William "Billy" Benedict as Bellboy
- Dorothy Christy as Mrs. Updyke
- Guy Usher as Inspector
- Douglas Evans as Announcer
- Sven Hugo Borg as Olaf
- Al Bridge as Trustee
- Fred Burns as Westerner
- Mary Davenport as Hotel Telephone Operator
- Virginia Farmer as Mrs. Brighton
- Dick Elliott as Tim Miller
- Charles Williams as The Pitchman
- Mary Currier as Felice Winters
- Joel Friedkin
- Jack Raymond as Hot Dog Man
- Jimmie Fox as Window Cleaner
- Edmund Cobb as Sergeant
- Frank Fanning as Wilbur
- Ben Hall as Attendant
- Ralph Peters
- Sada Simmons
- Morgan Brown
- Margaret Marquis
- Rand Brooks
