= D. M. Ladd =

FBI agent

Daniel Milton Ladd
- Born: October 30, 1903; Fargo, North Dakota, US
- Died: July 11, 1960 (aged 56); Sanford, Florida, US
- Other name: Mickey Ladd
- Education: George Washington University
- Occupation: federal special agent
- Years active: 1925–1954
- Era: Great Depression, World War II, early Cold War
- Employer: Federal Bureau of Investigation
- Known for: Hiss-Chambers Case, Julius and Ethel Rosenberg Case
- Spouse: Katharine Pfeiffer

D.M. Ladd, also known as D. Milton Ladd and "Mickey" Ladd (1903–1960), was a special agent and assistant (number 3 position) at the Federal Bureau of Investigation (FBI) to its director J. Edgar Hoover, who was "one of the earliest members" of the FBI.

== Background ==
Daniel Milton Ladd was born on October 30, 1903, in Fargo, North Dakota. His parents were U.S. Senator Edwin F. Ladd and Rizpah Sprogle. He attended public school. Following his father's election to the Senate in 1921, he moved to Washington, DC, where he attended the George Washington University (GW). In 1925, he obtained A.B. from GW, where he played basketball and was a member of the District of Columbia Alpha chapter of the Sigma Phi Epsilon fraternity. In 1928, after several years of night school, he obtained a law degree from GW.

== Career ==
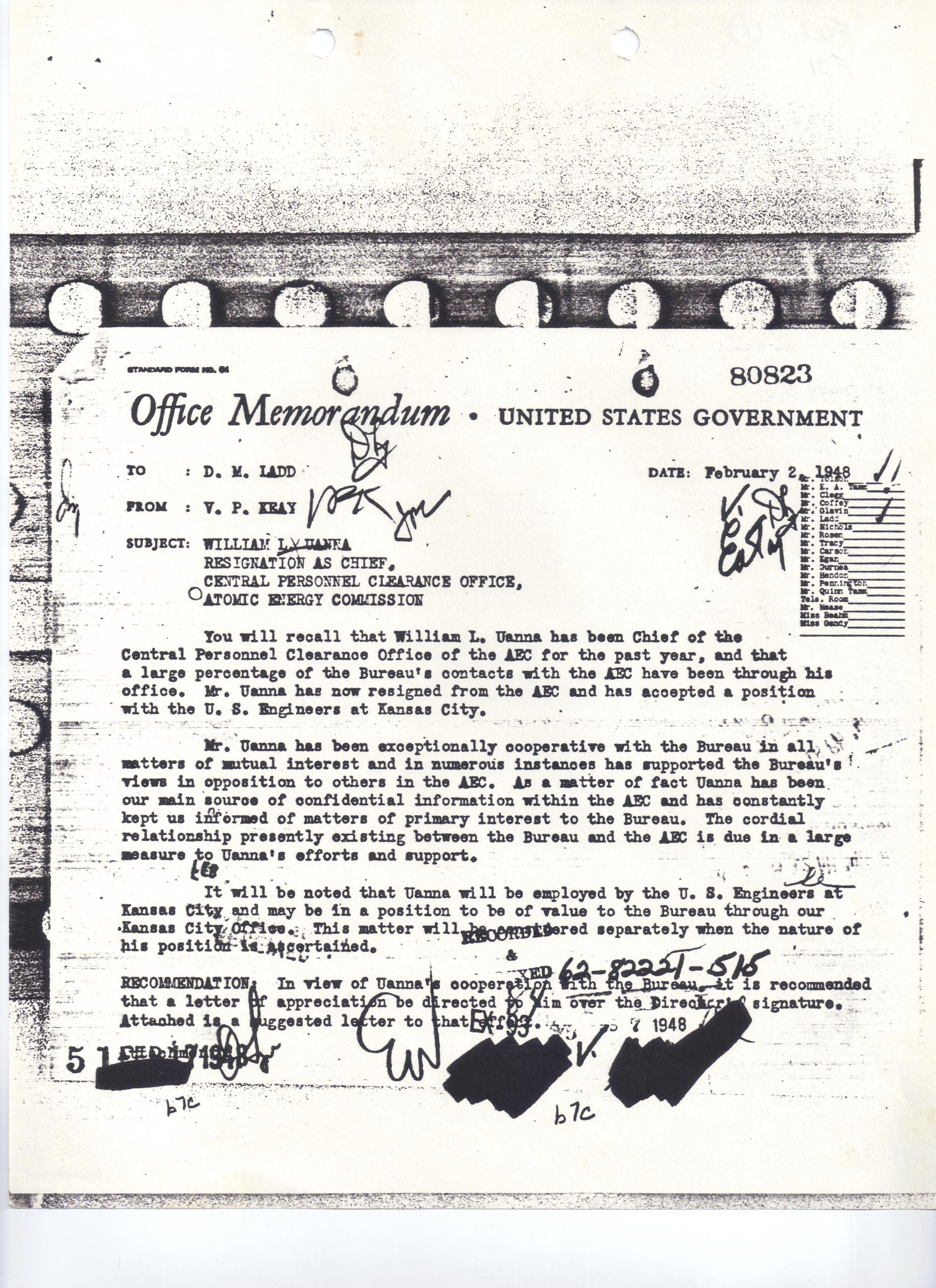
FBI memo dated 2 February 1948, to Ladd regarding William L. Uanna of the Atomic Energy Commission as subject (person of interest)

Ladd worked at his father's office initially, then helped run subway cars between US Capitol office buildings.

On November 5, 1925, having finished law school, Ladd joined the FBI as an agent. His first assignment was in Butte, Montana, followed by New Orleans, Louisiana. In 1931, he became a special agent, assigned to St. Louis, Missouri; St. Paul, Minnesota; Chicago, Illinois; and Washington, DC, field offices.

In 1939, Ladd became assistant director of the FBI's Technical Laboratory, AKA Identification Division and Laboratory. In 1941, Ladd became head of the Security Division, which in 1942 became the FBI's Domestic Intelligence Division (in the 21st Century known as "counterintelligence"). In this role, Ladd led investigations into Nazis (e.g., Operation Pastorius) during World War II and into Communists during WWII and the early Cold War including major cases like the Amerasia affair, Hiss-Chambers Case, and Julius and Ethel Rosenberg case as well as alleged spies Alexander Koral, Robert Talbott Miller, William L. Uanna, Harry Dexter White, and Duncan Chapin Lee Case and even movies stars like Lucille Ball and subjects such as UFOs.

On May 5, 1949, Hoover appointed Ladd to the Number 3 position of Assistant to the Director, succeeding Edward Allen Tamm, as second only to Clyde Tolson. As Hoover's "assistant," Ladd's role was "supervision of all the FBI's investigative activities in both criminal and subversive fields."

In 1954, Ladd retired from the FBI.

In 1960, Ladd ran for Congress in the district for Sanford, Florida, the town where he was living.

== Personal life and death ==
On June 15, 1937, Lad married Katharine Pfeiffer.

On July 11, 1960, D.M. Ladd died in an automobile accident in Sanford, Florida; his wife survived the crash with injuries.

== Legacy ==
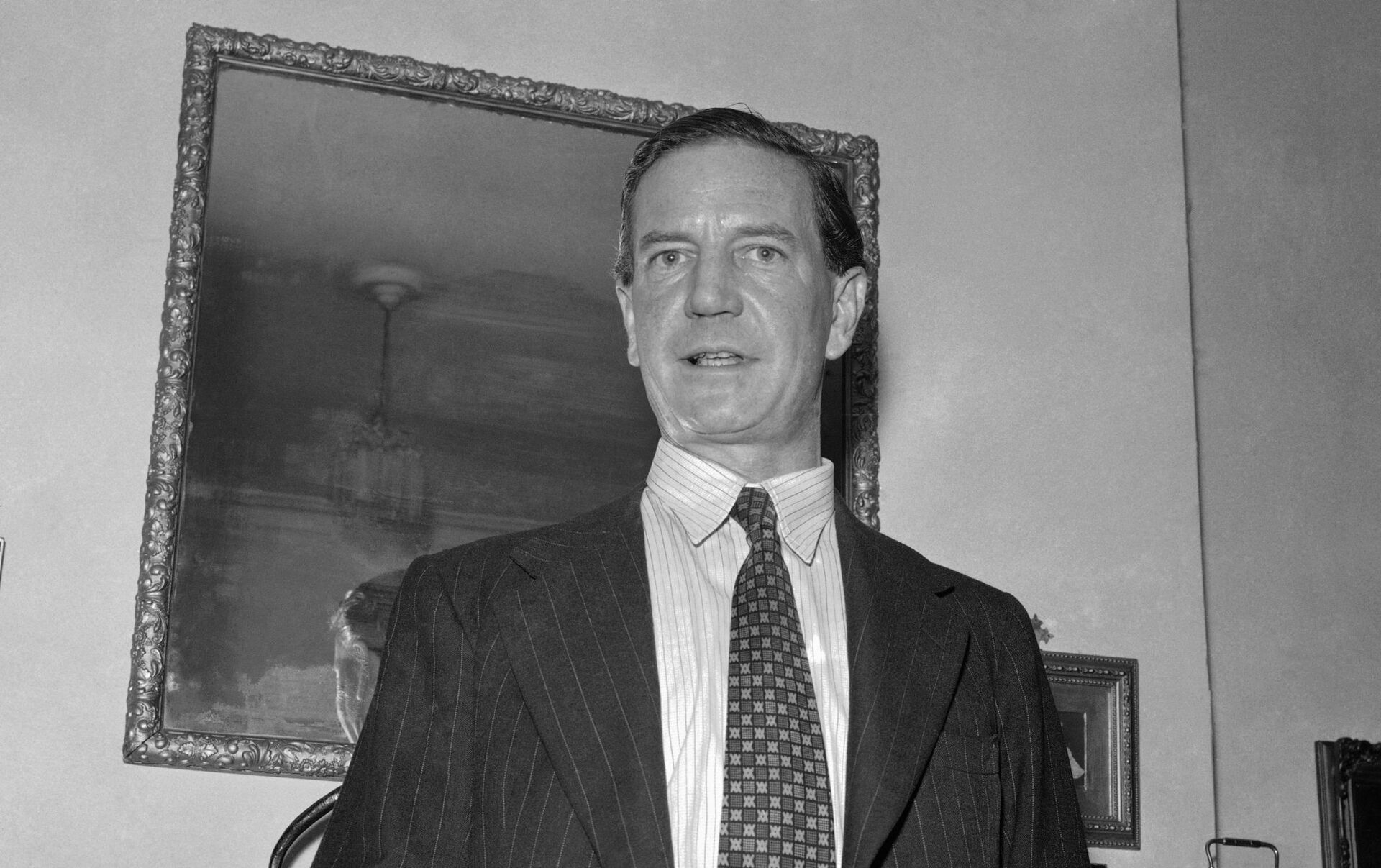
In 1968, Soviet spy Kim Philby (here in 1955) claimed that Ladd believed FDR was a Comintern agent

At time of death, the Washington Evening Star wrote: "Mr. Ladd never liked to talk about cases in which he participated. Although it was known that he had taken significant roles in the capture many of the leading gangsters in the '30s, he said on his retirement, 'I don't approve of people who go out and write books'."

In 1998, the CIA released a report that in 1968 Izvestia published an interview with Soviet spy Kim Philby, who states that Ladd had made an "indelible impression" on Philby due to Ladd's conviction that Franklin Delano Roosevelt was a Comintern agent."

== See also ==
Other contemporary FBI colleagues include:

- Edward Allen Tamm
- J. Edgar Hoover
- Clyde Tolson
- William C. Sullivan
- Louis J. Russell
- Alvin Williams Stokes
- Jacob Spolansky
