= Koral =

Koral may refer to:

- Koral, Pakistan, a village and Union Council in Islamabad Capital Territory, Pakistan
- Zastava Koral or Yugo, a Yugoslav/Serbian car produced from 1980 to 2008
- KORAL Electronic Warfare System

== People ==
- Alexander Koral (fl. 1939–1948), American Soviet spy
- Helen Koral (fl. 1939–1948), American Soviet spy, wife of Alexander Koral
- Füreya Koral (1910–1997), Turkish ceramic artist
- Mehmet Emin Koral (1881–1959), Turkish general

== See also ==
- Coral (disambiguation)
- Korall, a Russian cheese
