= Coral (disambiguation) =

Coral is a type of marine animal.

Coral may also refer to:

- Precious coral, a red or pink gem made from the skeleton of a coral species
- Coral (color), several colors similar to that of the gem
- Coral (given name), a given name
- Coral snake, a type of a venomous snake found in the Americas

== Places ==
=== Australia ===
- Coral Sea, a region of the north-east coast of Australia

=== United States ===
- Coral, Illinois, an unincorporated community
- Coral City, Wisconsin, an unincorporated community

== Entertainment and media ==
- The Coral, a British band
  - The Coral (album), a 2002 album by the band
- Coral Pictures, a Radio Caracas Televisión subsidiary based in Miami, Florida
- Coral Records, a Decca Records subsidiary
- Coral Smith (born 1979), American reality television personality known as a cast member on MTV's The Real World: Back to New York
- Coral, a character in the film Finding Nemo
- Coral, the main protagonist of the Aqua Pups subseries of Paw Patrol

== Computing ==
- CORAL 66 programming language, a block-structured programming language for real-time systems
- Coral Consortium, a cross-industry group to promote interoperability between digital rights management (DRM) technologies used in the consumer media market

== Other uses ==
- Coral (cypher machine), a Japanese WWII naval cypher
- Coral beer, a lager from Madeira, Portugal
- Coral (bookmaker), a chain of betting shops in the UK
- Coral Reef Alliance, a non-profit organization
- Coral, the unfertilized eggs of a scallop, which turn a reddish color when cooked
- MV Coral, a cruise ship operated by Louis Cruises

== See also ==
- Corail (disambiguation)
- Corral (disambiguation)
- Koral (disambiguation)
- Korall, a Russian cheese
- Choral
