= Courtney E. Owens =

American investigator for the federal government

- Born: Courtney Elwell Owens; January 5, 1924; Washington, DC, US
- Died: November 18, 2014 (aged 90); Laguna Niguel, CA, US
- Occupation: HUAC chief investigator (1954-1957)
- Years active: 1943-1982
- Employer: HUAC
- Organization: United States House of Representatives

Courtney E. Owens (1924–2014), AKA Courtney Owens, was a 20th-century American civil servant, best known as chief investigator for the House Un-American Activities Committee (HUAC) from 1954 to 1957.

== Background ==
Courtney Elwell Owens was born on January 5, 1924, in Washington, DC.

== Career ==
Owens served in the US Navy during World War II from January 1943 to August 1946, discharged from the Office of Naval Intelligence. He then obtained a degree from Tulane University.

In March 1947, Owens started work as an investigator for the House Un-American Activities Committee (HUAC). Cases included the Hiss-Chambers Case, e.g., investigating witness and alleged Soviet spy Julian Wadleigh. His superior was senior investigator Louis J. Russell and colleague Donald T. Appell, all of whose names regularly appear in congressional hearings, e.g., the August 28, 1950, testimony of Lee Pressman. From 1954 to 1957, he serve as HUAC's chief investigator. Occasionally, his name appeared in the news, along with colleagues such as Russell.

In 1957, Owens moved with his family to Southern California. In 1959, he started work with Townsend Engineering in nearby Santa Ana, California, and led marketing and sales of its "Identi-Kit," a visual identification system for law enforcement. He retired in 1982.

== Personal life and death ==
Owens married and had three children.

Courtney Owns died age 99 on November 18, 2014, at his home in Laguna Niguel, California.

== Legacy ==
Owens appears in many books regarding HUAC investigations, including:

- 1997: Whittaker Chambers: A Biography
- 2010: I Was a Communist for the FBI: The Unhappy Life and Times of Matt Cvetic
- 2011: Frank Capra: The Catastrophe of Success
- 2019: Professor Berman: The Last Lecture of Minnesota's Greatest Public Historian

== See also ==
- Louis J. Russell
- Alvin Williams Stokes
- House Un-American Activities Committee
- Office of Naval Intelligence
