= William Mandel =

American writer and activist (1917–2016)

William "Bill" Mandel
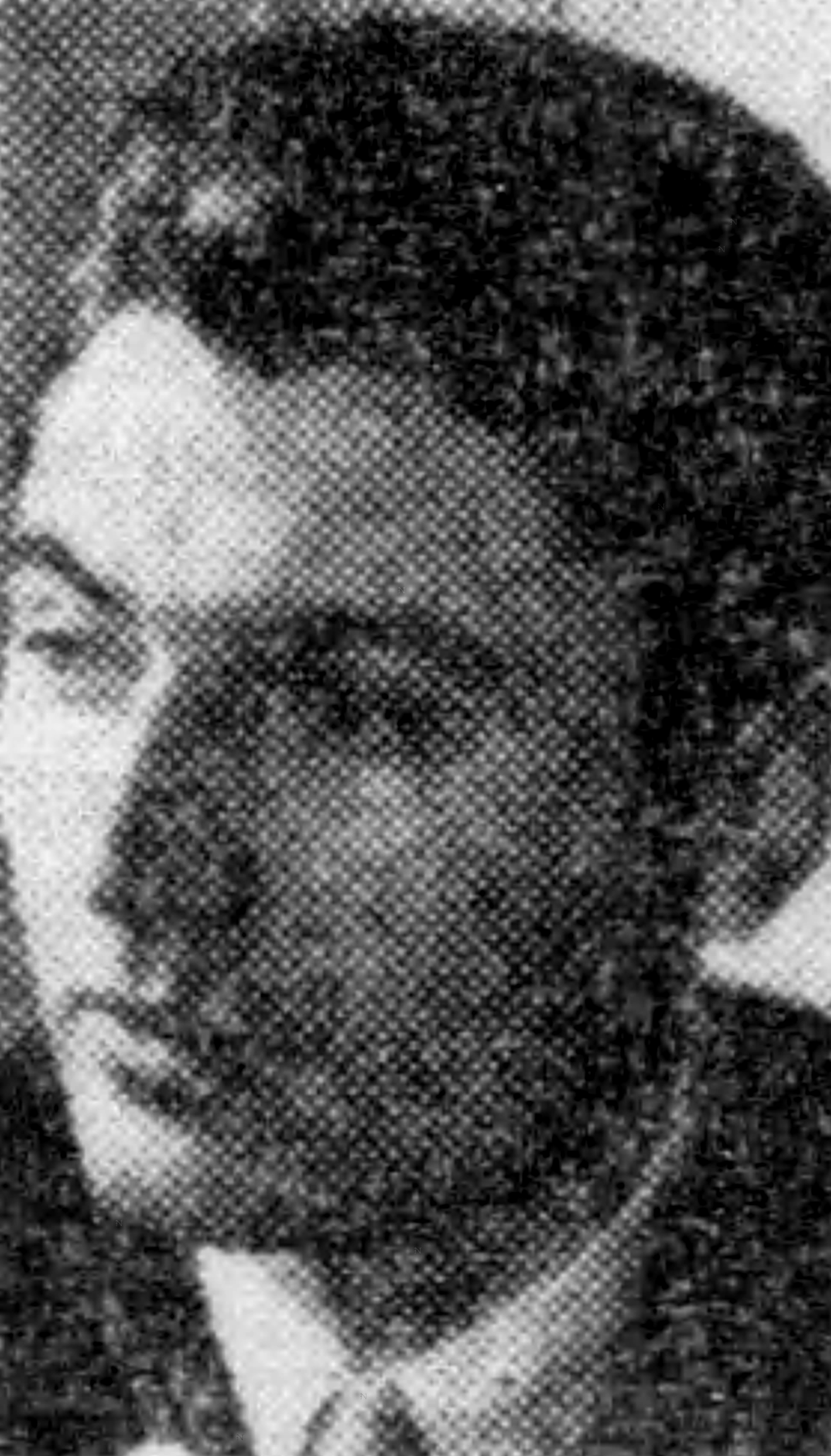
- Mandel c. 1952
- Born: William Marx Mandel; June 4, 1917; New York City, New York, U.S.
- Died: November 24, 2016 (aged 99); Kensington, California, U.S.
- Resting place: Kensington, Ca. (ash-scattering)
- Occupations: Author; broadcast journalist; political activist
- Employer(s): Self; pro bono at KQED TV, KPFA Radio
- Known for: Soviet affairs expert, analyst & educator; political activist
- Spouse: Tanya Millstein Mandel (1917–2001)
- Children: Phyllis, Robert and David
- Parent(s): Max Mandel [born Mordka Gimpel Mandelman], civil engineer; Dora Schachter Mandel
- Relatives: Eugene Victor Mandel (brother; electrical engineer, teacher)

William Marx Mandel (June 4, 1917 – November 24, 2016) was an American broadcast journalist, left-wing political activist, and author, best known as a Soviet affairs analyst. He was born in New York City.

== Senator McCarthy and the House Un-American Activities Committee ==
External videos
- The Investigation of William Mandel by Sen. Joseph McCarthy on YouTube, Radical Films

Considered a leading Sovietologist during the 1940s and 1950s, Mandel was a fellow at Stanford University's Hoover Institution, but lost his position there due to the political pressures of the McCarthy era. He is perhaps best known for standing up to Senator Joseph McCarthy during a televised 1953 Senate committee hearing in which Mandel pointedly told the senator, "This is a book-burning! You lack only the tinder to set fire to the books as Hitler did twenty years ago, and I am going to get that across to the American people!"

In 1960, Mandel was again subpoenaed, this time by the House Un-American Activities Committee. He testified on May 13 in a hearing held at the San Francisco City Hall. Outside the hearing, hundreds of protesting Bay Area college students were blasted with firehoses and dragged down the marble steps by police officers, leaving some seriously injured. Newsreel cameras recorded Mandel's scathing response to the question posed by Lead Counsel Richard Arens, "Are you now or have you ever been a member of the Communist Party?":

Honorable beaters of children, sadists, uniformed and in plain clothes, distinguished Dixiecrat wearing the clothing of a gentleman, eminent Republican who opposes an accommodation with the one country with which we must live at peace in order for us and all our children to survive. My boy of fifteen left this room a few minutes ago in sound health and not jailed, solely because I asked him to be in here to learn something about the procedures of the United States government and one of its committees. Had he been outside where a son of a friend of mine had his head split by these goons operating under your orders, my boy today might have paid the penalty of permanent injury or a police record for desiring to come here and hear how this committee operates. If you think that I am going to cooperate with this collection of Judases, of men who sit there in violation of the United States Constitution, if you think I will cooperate with you in any way, you are insane!

Mandel "spent the remainder of his testimony respectfully telling his inquisitors to go to hell."

Recordings of the hearing were aired repeatedly on KPFA and other Pacifica Radio stations in subsequent years, and "literally represented the final hours of the 1950s" for young people who had come of age in the McCarthy era. Scenes from the hearings and protest were later featured in the award-winning 1990 documentary, Berkeley in the Sixties.

== Broadcaster and activist ==
Mandel began his career as a broadcaster in 1958, with a 15-minute-long weekly broadcast on Pacifica Radio station KPFA-FM in Berkeley, California. Within six months he was asked to expand to a half-hour; over a 32-year run, he went to an hour-long weekly program, then back to the half-hour format. Originally called Soviet Press and Periodicals, the program stayed on the air under various names until 1995, when it was abruptly cancelled by KPFA's national parent organization Pacifica Foundation—which eventually acknowledged that its dismissal first of Rolling Stone co-founder and renowned jazz critic Ralph Gleason and then Mandel was solely out of fear that the federal Corporation for Public Broadcasting would cut funding to Pacifica if "leftist" commentators were retained.

Mandel appears in the documentary film KPFA On the Air (Independent Television Service, 2000). Subsequently, Mandel hosted a weekly show on Free Radio Berkeley.

In his book, In Battle for Peace, the noted Black American scholar and activist Dr. W. E. B. Du Bois referred to William Mandel's "defense" of him when Du Bois was "under federal indictment for heading the circulation of a peace petition".

Mandel was the only non-student asked by its founders to sit on the Steering Committee of the Free Speech Movement in Berkeley, California in the early 1960s.

In 1968, he signed the "Writers and Editors War Tax Protest" pledge, vowing to refuse tax payments in protest against the Vietnam War.

Mandel's radio program on KPFA was, during its later decades, titled The Soviet Union: A Closer Look Until the early 1970s, Mandel was a vocal supporter of the 1968 Soviet-led invasion of Czechoslovakia on this program. During the 1970s and 1980s he vigorously denied the existence of state-directed anti-Semitism in the Soviet Union, disputing from personal experience the decades of scholarly research and the testimonies of Soviet emigres in the Bay Area, dissidents like Nobel prize winner Joseph Brodsky and the quotas on Jewish students. His common refrain during KPFA broadcasts was "the Soviet Union is 100 races living together in harmony". Mandel's denial of Soviet governmental anti-Semitism was maintained as late as his 1985 book "Soviet but not Russian: The Other Peoples of the Soviet Union" which stated that at most 10% of Soviet Jews would want to leave the Soviet Union. Approximately 290,000 Jews left the Soviet Union from 1970 to 1988, when emigration was restricted; over 224,000 left in 1990 alone, the first full year when emigration was liberalized.

In January 1982, Mandel wrote an article in the Stanford Daily supporting the coup of Polish General W. Jaruzelski which imposed martial law as an attempt to crush the Solidarity trade union.

In 1992 he served as the consulting editor to the production of "The Rise and Fall of the Soviet Union Trading Cards: From Lenin to Yeltsin," a history of the USSR in the form of a series of baseball cards, written by David Thorpe and illustrated by Greg Copeland.

Mandel died on Thanksgiving Day, November 24, 2016 at the age of 99 at his home in Kensington, California.

== Writings ==
The introduction to Mandel's autobiography, Saying No To Power, was written by the left-wing historian and author Howard Zinn. The book was praised by, among others, author and senior editor of The Black Scholar, Robert L. Allen, musician and activist Pete Seeger and poet Lawrence Ferlinghetti.

The Hoover Institution Archives, Wisconsin Historical Society and the Bancroft Library at the University of California have collections of Mandel's papers.

=== Books ===
- 'The Soviet Far East and Central Asia', Institute of Pacific Relations, 1944
- A Guide to the Soviet Union, The Dial Press, 1946
- Soviet Marxism and Social Science reprint Ramparts Press, 1984, ISBN 9780878670970
- Russia Re-Examined, 1967
- Soviet Women, Anchor Books, 1975, ISBN 9780385032551
- Soviet But Not Russian: The ‘Other’ Peoples of the Soviet Union, Palo Alto, Calif.: University of Alberta Press and Ramparts Press, 1985, ISBN 9780878670956
- Saying No To Power, Berkeley: Creative Arts Book Company, 1999, ISBN 9780887392863
