= Louis J. Russell =

FBI agent and private detective

- Born: Louis James Russell; December 16, 1911; Louisville, Kentucky, U.S.
- Died: July 2, 1973 (aged 61); Calvert County, Maryland, U.S.
- Other name: Damon Runyon
- Education: Catholic University of America
- Occupations: Special agent, investigator
- Known for: Watergate scandal involvement
- Police career
- Agency: Federal Bureau of Investigation
- Service years: 1937–1944
- Rank: Special agent
- Other work: HUAC chief investigator

Louis James Russell (December 16, 1911 – July 2, 1973) was an American special agent and investigator for the Federal Bureau of Investigation, the House Un-American Activities Committee, and a private detective agency involved in the Watergate scandal.

== Career ==
=== Federal Bureau of Investigation ===
Russell graduated from the Catholic University of America, and joined the Federal Bureau of Investigation on June 7, 1937, as a special agent. Author Jim Hougan characterized Russell as an alcoholic and womanizer, and his resignation was requested in 1944, after misuse of an official automobile.

=== Anti-communism ===
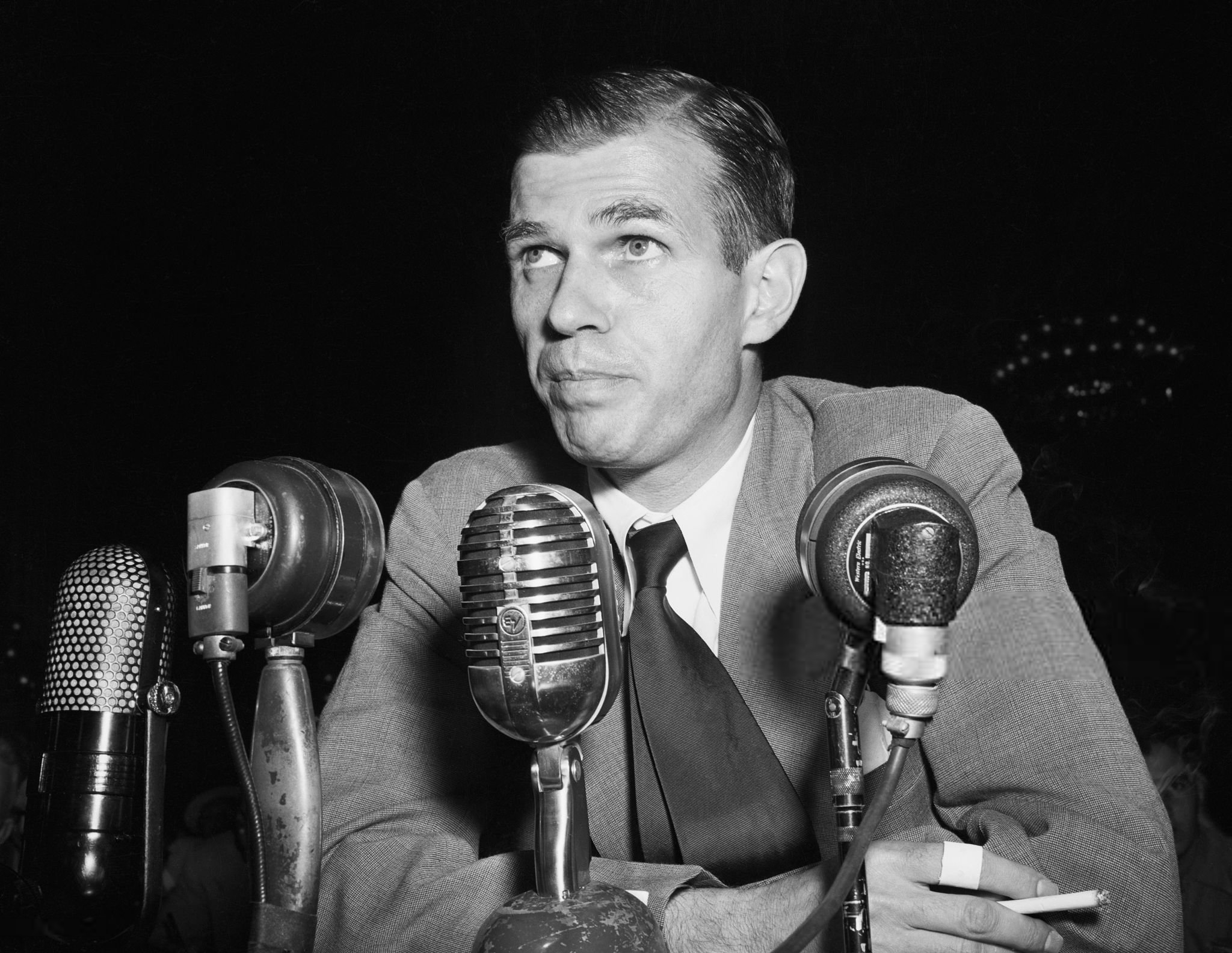
Alger Hiss, whom Russell restrained from striking Whittaker Chambers in 1948

In 1945, Russell joined the House Un-American Activities Committee (HUAC) as an investigator. Robert E. Stripling has Russell testify on what he knew about Gerhart Eisler and Hollywood industry people. He also testified about Leon Josephson and Alexander Koral.

By 1948, Russell was a HUAC senior investigator in the Alger Hiss–Whittaker Chambers case. In his memoir Six Crises, Richard Nixon recalled that Russell restrained Hiss when it seemed Hiss was about to strike Chambers. Russell served under Robert E. Stripling and his successor Frank S. Tavenner Jr. Investigators who reported to him included Courtney E. Owens and Donald T. Appell.

He helped uncover evidence of Soviet spy rings and leaks of atomic secrets and materials to the Soviet Union. In 1952, he helped try to find Communist influence in the motion picture industry. In January 1954, Russell was dismissed by committee chair, Representative Harold H. Velde. Russell had borrowed $300 from actor Edward G. Robinson. In 1956, Russell was rehired and remained with HUAC for a decade.

=== Private investigator ===
In 1966, Russell became a private investigator. To undermine the credibility of investigative report Jack Anderson, the Richard M. Nixon campaign hired Russell "to spy" on him. In return for leads, Anderson gave Russell odd jobs for the "Washington Merry-Go-Round," enabling Russell to send information back to the campaign, whose director of security was James W. McCord

=== Watergate scandal ===
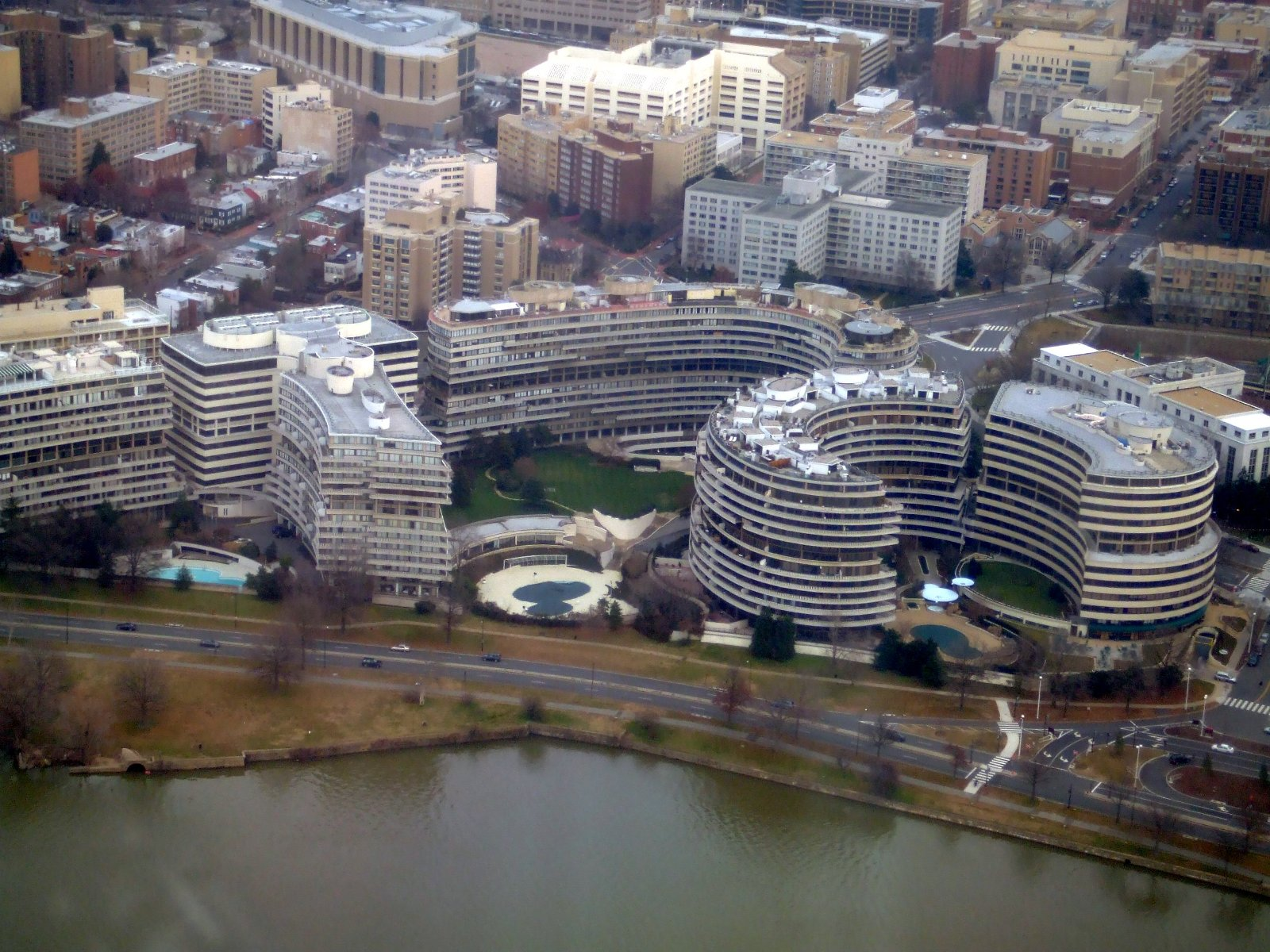
Russell was involved in the Watergate scandal

In 1971, Russell was working for General Security Services a security guard service whose clients included the Watergate offices. After the Watergate break-in in 1972, James W. McCord Jr. "refused to discuss Russell under any circumstances and ... would not discuss Watergate with any writer who so much as expressed interest in Lou Russell." From June 20 to July 2, 1973, Russell was working for a detective agency that was helping George Herbert Walker Bush—then chairman of the Republican National Committee—prepare for a press conference.

According to attorney Gerald Alch, McCord hired "an old associate of his" [Russell] to his company Security International, Inc. Bob Smith, aide and office manager to attorney Bernard Fensterwald recounted that McCord had obtained a contract to provide security to the Republican National Committee. Unable to cash McCord's checks, Russell brought some dozen checks over time to Fensterwald's office at the "Committee to Investigate Assassinations", which Fensterwald would cash. During the Watergate break-in, Russell was checked into a Howard Johnson's Motel across from Watergate.

Russell died of a massive heart attack on July 2, 1973, at his daughter's home in Calvert County, Maryland.

== See also ==
- Jacob Spolansky
- Alvin Williams Stokes
