= Alexander Koral =

American spy for Soviet Union

- Born: April 18, 1897; London
- Died: July 1, 1968 (aged 71)
- Occupations: engineer (1922-1948), spy
- Spouse: Helen Koral
- Espionage activity
- Allegiance: Soviet Union
- Service branch: NKVD, Communist Party of the United States
- Service years: 1939-1948 (estimated)

Alexander Koral (1897 – 1968) was an American member of the Communist Party of the United States (CPUSA) who headed a network of spies for Soviet intelligence during World War II called the "Art" or "Berg" group. Koral's wife, Helen Koral, also was involved with the group.

== Background ==
Koral was born in London on April 18, 1897.

== Career ==
Koral began to work for New York City's Board of Education in 1926 as an engineer. By 1948, he was assistant engineer of construction.

=== FBI surveillance ===
The FBI first detected Koral in 1941 while surveiling Gaik Ovakimian, whom the FBI did not realize at the time was the head of KGB operations in the United States. The FBI noted Ovakimian meeting several times with Koral, though no espionage could be proved.

After the War, in 1947, Koral confessed, when confronted by the FBI, that he was a courier for the KGB from 1939 to 1945. Koral told the FBI he was paid two thousand dollars to travel to different cities to pick up and deliver small packages and envelopes to different persons, including Nathan Gregory Silvermaster and Helen Silvermaster. In December 1945, Koral had been sent to tell Silvermaster “no more visits would be made to him”, at the time of Elizabeth Bentley's defection and the Soviet networks were being compromised. Koral identified Semyon Semenov as one of his contacts in Soviet intelligence to whom he had delivered materials.

Koral was also a contact of Michael Straight. Koral's code name in the Soviet intelligence, and as deciphered in the Venona decrypts is "Berg".

=== Public exposure ===
On August 8, 1948, the Washington Post reported:

The curtain will rise again Monday morning [April 9, 1948] on Washington's current spy thriller when the House Committee on Un-American Activities calls upon two key witnesses to tell the public what they know of Communist espionage here... One witness will be Victor Perlo... The other will be Alexander Koral, described by Chairman Karl Mundt (R., S. Dak.) as a former "contact" man between New York and Washington.

When asked to testify before HUAC on August 9, 1948, however, he pled the Fifth Amendment and refused to answer any questions about communist affiliations. On August 10, 1948, the Washington Post reported:

Two ashen-faced men stood up in the crowded caucus room of the Old House Office Building and were confronted by Miss Elizabeth T. Bentley, confessed courier for Communist underground... Both men, on the advice of counsel, refused to say whether or not they knew Ms. Bentely on the ground that an answer might tend to incriminate them... One was Victor Perlo... The other was Alexander Koral, a 51-year-old maintenance man employed by the New York City Board of Education, who was reminded when he was on the stand that he had already signed a confession to Government authorities of his part in a Washington-New York spy circuit. Koral refused to affirm or deny that he had made such a confession, and he refused to say on grounds of self-incrimination whether or not he is now or ever had been a Communist... Investigator Louis J. Russell, former FBI agent, took the stand... "Koral... had a sone who was ill and had a large amount of hospital and medical bills." Koral was linked by Russell to Nathan Gregory Silvermaster.

=== Dismissal ===
In late September 1948, Koral was dismissed from his job for failing to cooperate with HUAC per Chapter 40 Section 903 of the New York City Charter.

== Venona ==
Alexander Koral is referenced in the following Venona project decrypts:

- 1251 KGB New York to Moscow, 2 September 1944
- 1332 KGB New York to Moscow, 18 September 1944
- 1582 KGB New York to Moscow, 12 November 1944
- 1636 KGB New York to Moscow, 21 November 1944
- 1803 KGB New York to Moscow, 22 December 1944
- 50 KGB New York to Moscow, 11 January 1945
- 1052 KGB New York to Moscow, 5 July 1945
- 275 KGB Moscow to New York, 25 March 1945
- 337 KGB Moscow to New York, 8 April 1945

== After Venona ==
The Cold War International History Project (CWIHP) has the full text of former KGB agent Alexander Vassiliev's Notebooks containing new evidence on Koral's cooperation with the Soviet Union.

== See also ==
- Elizabeth Bentley
- Whittaker Chambers
- Alger Hiss
- Victor Perlo
- Alexander Vassiliev
- Venona

== Sources ==
Documentation:

- New York FBI memo, 7 December 1945, FBI Silvermaster file, serial 248.
- Ladd to Hoover, 12 December 1945, FBI Silvermaster file, serial 235.
- Koral statement, 11 June 1947, FBI Silvermaster file, serial 2608.
- Alexander Koral interview summary, 9 June 1947, FBI Silvermaster file, serial 2571.
- FBI memorandum, “Existing Corroboration of Bentley's Overall Testimony,” 6 May 1955, FBI Silvermaster file, serial 4201.
- Klehr, Harvey; Haynes, John Earl (March 21, 2005). "Professors of Denial, Ignoring the Truth About American Communists". The Weekly Standard. 25 (10). Archived from the original on March 4, 2007 – via FindArticles.
- FBI Silvermaster File

Books:

- David Caute, The Great Fear: The Anti-Communist Purge under Truman and Eisenhower (New York: Simon and Schuster, 1978), pg. 156.
- John Earl Haynes and Harvey Klehr, Venona: Decoding Soviet Espionage in America, Yale University Press (1999), pgs. 151–152, 157, 353, 415n91, 455.
- Michael Straight, After Long Silence (New York: Norton, 1983)
- Vassiliev, Alexander (2003). Alexander Vassiliev's Notes on Anatoly Gorsky's December 1948 Memo on Compromised American Sources and Networks. Cold War International History Project.
- Allen Weinstein and Alexander Vassiliev, The Haunted Wood: Soviet Espionage in America—the Stalin Era (New York: Random House, 1999).
- Nigel West and Oleg Tsarev, The Crown Jewels: The British Secrets at the Heart of the KGB Archives (London: HarperCollins, 1998)
