= Corral (disambiguation) =

A corral is an enclosure for livestock.

Corral may also refer to:

== Places ==
- Corral, Chile, a town and municipality in Chile
- Corral, Idaho, an unincorporated community in the United States
- Corral Bay

== Other uses ==
- Corral (defense), a defense circle of wagons
- Corral (film), a 1954 National Film Board of Canada documentary
- Corral (puzzle), a logic puzzle
- Corral (surname), a surname

== See also ==
- Corral del Carbón, a building in Granada, Andalusia (Spain)
- Coral (disambiguation)
