= Jacob Spolansky =

FBI agent and private detective

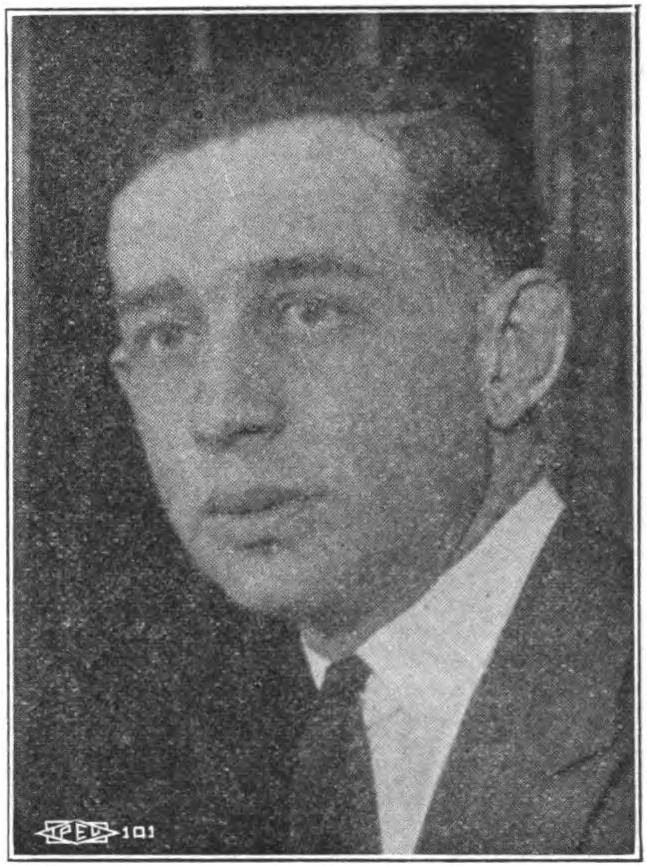
- Born: Jacob Sehpoliansky c. 1890; Kiev, Kiev Governorate, Russian Empire
- Died: August 1966
- Other name: Jake Spolansky
- Police career
- Department: Federal Bureau of Investigation, Wayne County, Michigan police
- Service years: 1918-1951
- Rank: detective
- Other work: writer

Jacob Spolansky (born Jacob Sehpoliansky; c. 1890 – August 1966) was an American born Jew from the Russian Empire (today Ukraine) who rotated between government and private (corporate) investigative agencies as "part of a class of professional spies fostered by the growth of anticommunism during the First World War and first Red Scare, perhaps best known as "chief of the 'red squad'", a "professional enemy of communism," and a key player in the government raid on the 1922 Bridgman Convention.

== Background ==
Jacob Spolansky was born around 1890 near Kyiv, Ukraine (then part of the Russian Empire). He studied two years at university in Kiev and another year at the University of Zurich. In 1910 (or 1909 or 1912), he arrived in the United States. He studied two years at a law school in Chicago.

== Career ==
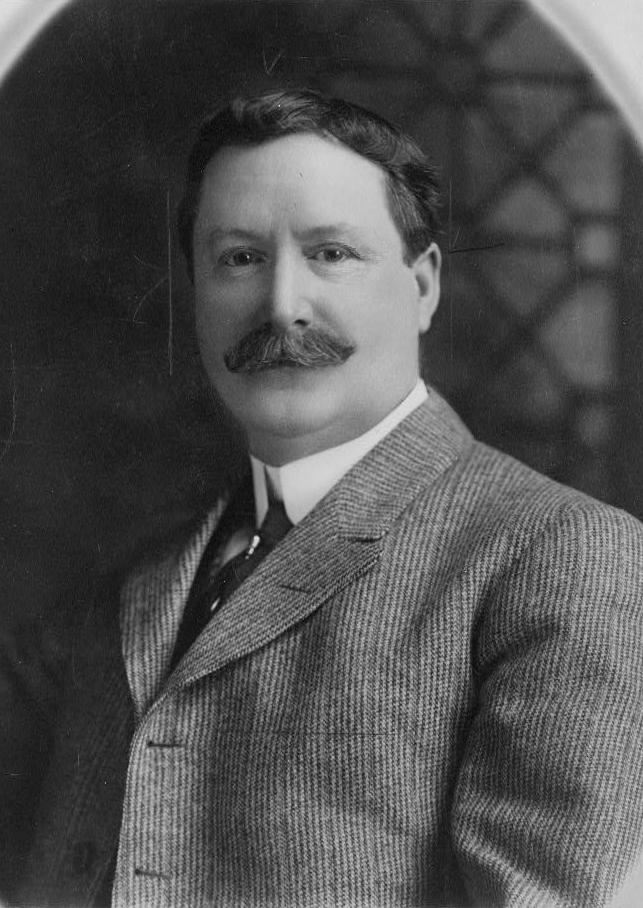
William J. Burns (undated photo) hired Spolansky to his private detective agency in 1924

Initially a lumberjack and elevator operator, from 1911 to 1915, Spolansky sold newspapers in Chicago and then "operated a newspaper" in Chicago, the first-ever Russian-language newspaper there.

In April 1918, Spolansky joined US Army's Military Intelligence Division for a year. On July 19, 1919, he joined the Bureau of Investigation or BI (the future Federal Bureau of Investigation or FBI), the latter as a special agent for six years specializing in "subversive activities." He also worked for the Dies Committee.

Over the next three decades, whether for governmental or corporate agencies, he "spied on and infiltrated radical and labor organizations." Further, Spolansky worked with government committees, business associations, and media to gather support for legislation against political and industrial radicals. In 1918 during the First Red Scare, he ran an informant in Chicago among the Industrial Workers of the World (IWW or "Wobblies") who posed as a radical agitator at steel factory in Gary, Indiana. In September 1922 during the Great Railroad Strike of 1922 (AKA the Railway Shopmen's Strike), Spolansky led a group of BI and Secret Service staff who protected US Attorney General Harry M. Daugherty. In December 1922, he located and led the raid on the Bridgman Convention of the still-nascent US communist party and personally arrested William Z. Foster. (Spolansky, "a Department of Justice stool pigeon," had infiltrated the event by posing as a member of "the Socialist and other radical parties.") On January 23, 1924, Spolansky submitted his letter of resignation to BI director William J. Burns; soon after, articles appeared in the Chicago Daily News under his name with information believed to have come from the BI. In mid-October 1924, the CPUSA's Daily Worker newspaper complained of Chicago Daily News articles as lies by that "discharged federal fink." The paper ridiculed him: "Spolansky Exposes Own Plots." In late October 1924, the newspaper reported that "Jake" had joined the Burns Detective Agency in Chicago, run by his former BOI boss Burns, "King of Dicks." In February 1926, the a Philadelphia businessman informed the FBI that Spolansky was working for the National Clay Products Industries Association in Chicago. In August 1926, the Federated Press's Labor's News outed Spolansky as a "faded stool" and "expert" on Reds (with allegedly 20 years experience from Scotland Yard, "U.S. militant and navy intelligence," and the BI), working for the Botany Worsted Mills during the 1926 Passaic textile strike, following the failure of predecessors in a frame-up of strike leader Albert Weisbord. Spolansky also helped track Comintern agent Mikhail Borodin in the USA. In 1931, he helped write Michigan's 1931 "Spolansky Act." During the 1920s and 1930s, he donated further time to assist Army and Navy intelligence. In 1933, he became a Michigan state trooper and later that year a detective for Wayne County, Michigan. In 1935, he served as a detective for the Chrysler Corporation. In February 1935, FBI director J. Edgar Hoover refused to back Spolansky's "reputation and reliability" when the Detroit Times asked for a reference for him as a source. and Later, he served as investigator for the National Association of Manufacturers. At some point in time, he worked for the Detroit Sheriff's Office and the Detroit Employers Association. From February to August 1939, Spolansky worked for Gerald L.K. Smith. In 1940, he ran unsuccessfully for sheriff of Wayne County. In late 1940 and into 1942, Spolansky worked for George Mintzer of the American Jewish Committee. In the fall of 1941, Spolansky unsuccessfully tried to launch a Nonsectarian League for Americanism. In November 1941, he had a letter from the Dies Committee that claimed he was an investigator for it in the Detroit area regarding Nazis and the National Workers League.

== Testimony ==
In 1930, Spolansky testified before the Fish Committee. At the time, he was considered "the country's leading red-hunter specializing in the labor movement."

On October 12, 1938, while serving as a Wayne County detective, Spolansky testified in Detroit, Michigan, before the Dies Committee. He related his involvement in the arrest and deportation of Joseph Kowalski, an alleged communist, Cheka, and Comintern member, sentenced by Judge Julian Mack, and deported to Russia. He provided lists of: Slavic-named foreign workers, CPUSA publications, labor publications, CPUSA resolutions, Detroit Workers School materials, a list of communist organizations from the American Federation of Labor (AFL), copies of International Press Correspondence, and other materials he considered incriminating. He boasted of his years in "combating communism... and... combating communistic activities."

== Personal life and death ==
Spolansky married Maria and had two daughters.

According to his application to join the US Department of Justice, dated November 8, 1923, Spolansky spoke: Russian, Ukrainian, Bohemian (Czech), Bulgarian, Serbian, Croatian, French, Yiddish, and Lithuanian (Lithuanian).

Jacob Spolansky died age 76 in August 1966.

== Legacy ==
In 1957, a photo of Spolansky dated 1923 appeared in Theodore Draper's book The Roots of American Communism.

In the 2006 article "The Founders of American Anti-communism," academic Nick Fischer described the "multi-lingual" Spolansky as "a leading anticommunist agent" who "abhorred radicalism" and helped arrest more than 650 foreigners, of whom 400 faced deportation. In his 2016 book Spider Web: The Birth of American Anticommunism, Fischer devotes an entire chapter to Spolansky.

== Works ==
In his 1951 The Communist Trail in America, Spolansky describes his leadership in finding raw recruits who knew "comparatively little about the radical movements and their methods" and indoctrinating them into "the craft of trailing and investigating the enemies of the United States." Reviewing the book for the New York Times, Orville Prescott noted that the book contained stories of Spolansky's exploits as well as biographical sketches of communist leaders or fellow travelers but ultimately found it "superficial, disorderly, and tiresome." In a second review, Frank S. Adams ridicules Spolansky for asserting that Earl Browder was trying to create a new Communist International with Josip Broz Tito and wrote that "his book is most interesting when he confines himself to his personal observations and experiences."

Bureau of Investigation reports

- The Conference of Russian Branches of the American Socialist Party in Chicago: Organization, Representation, and Activities (August 9, 1919)
- Communist Party Convention: Day 2 — Sept. 2, 1919 (September 4, 1919)
- Communist Party of America Convention Day 3 — Sept. 3, 1919 (September 4, 1919)
- In Re: Communist Meeting at West Side Auditorium, Chicago, Sept. 21, 1919 (September 26, 1919)
- “The Red Evening”: Bureau of Investigation Report on the Mass Meeting Held at West Side Auditorium, Chicago, Nov. 1, 1919 (November 3, 1919)
- The Martens Controversy in the Russian Federation of the CPA: Undercover Report of a Meeting in Chicago (December 1, 1919)
- Military Intelligence Department Undercover Surveillance Reportof the Communist Labor Party (January 12, 1920)

Articles

- "Hunt $250,00.00 Smuggled Jews Here," Chicago Daily News (February 7, 1924)
- "Foster at Bridgman" (unsigned), St. Joseph Herald-Press (March 16, 1923)
- "Chicago Plots of the Reds Exposed by a United States Secret Service Agent,"Chicago Daily News (date?)
- "'Red' Plotters in America," Chicago Daily News (October 14, 1924)

Books

- The Red Trail in America (1924)
- The Communist Trail in America (1951)

== See also ==
- Louis J. Russell
- Alvin Williams Stokes
- First Red Scare
- Palmer Raids
- Bridgman Raid
- Federal Bureau of Investigation
- Dies Committee

== External sources ==
- Ernie Lazar FOIA: FBI Employees: Spolansky, Joseph 1-2-3
- Library of Congress - photo Joseph Spolansky (1938)
- Nick Fischer (May 2016). "Jacob Spolansky: The Rise of the Career Anticommunist Spook". Spider Web: The Birth of American Anticommunism. Vol. 1. University of Illinois Press. pp. 128–143. doi:10.5406/illinois/9780252040023.003.0007.
