= House Un-American Activities Committee =

American investigative committee (1938–1975)

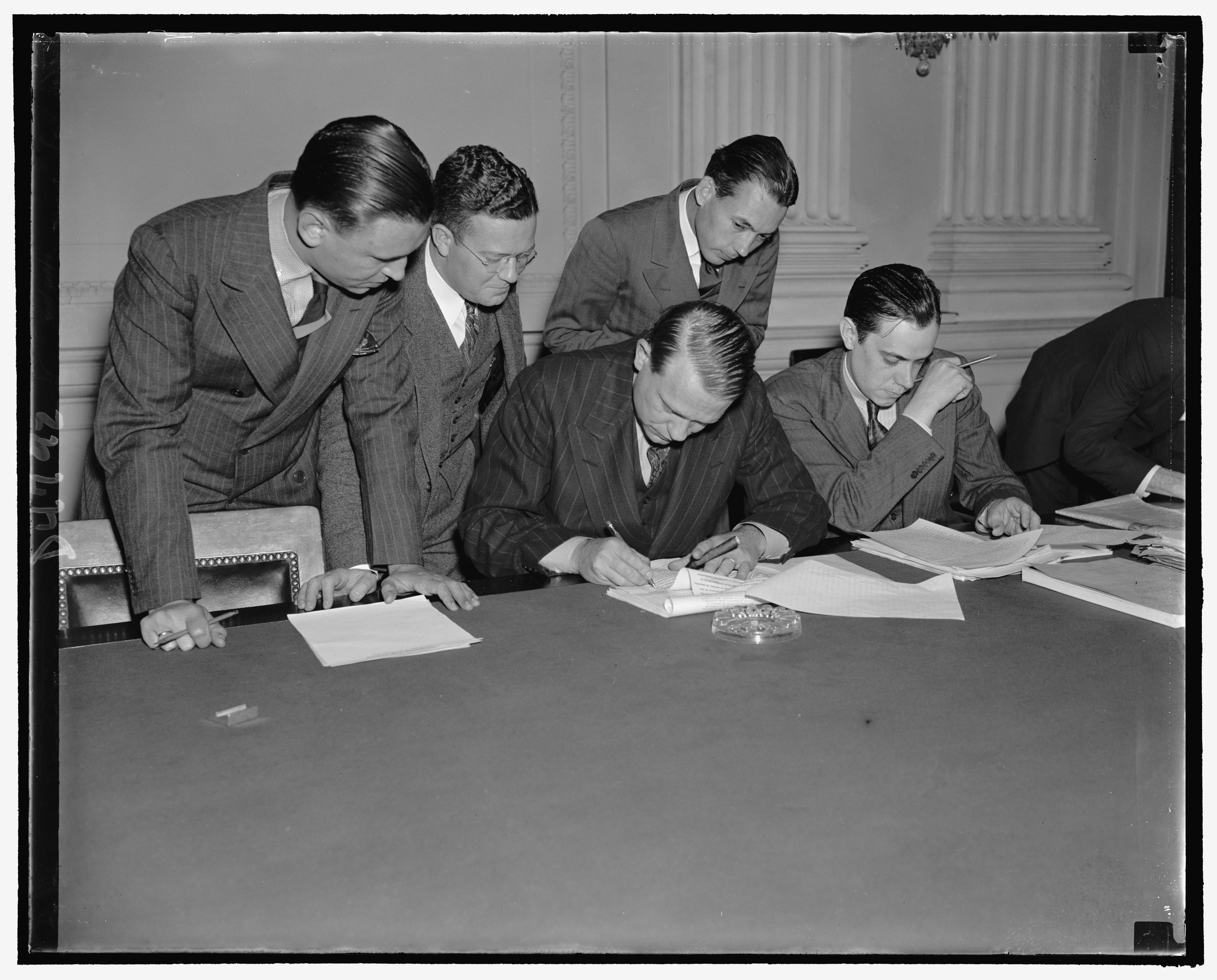
Chairman Martin Dies of the House Un-American Activities Committee proofreads his October 26, 1938, letter replying to President Roosevelt's attack on the committee.

The House Committee on Un-American Activities (HCUA), popularly the House Un-American Activities Committee (HUAC), was an investigative committee of the United States House of Representatives created in 1938. Their goal was to investigate alleged disloyalty and subversive activities on the part of private citizens, public employees, and those organizations suspected of having communist ties. It became a standing (permanent) committee in 1946. Then, from 1969 and onward, it was known as the House Committee on Internal Security. When the House abolished the committee in 1975, its functions were transferred to the House Judiciary Committee.

The committee's anti-communist investigations are often associated with McCarthyism, although Joseph McCarthy himself (as a U.S. senator) had no direct involvement with the House committee. McCarthy was the chairman of the Government Operations Committee and its Permanent Subcommittee on Investigations of the U.S. Senate, not the House.

== History ==
=== Precursors to the Committee ===
During the mid-20th century, the American public became increasingly concerned about the potential infiltration of foreign ideologies within the United States government. In response to this distress, several congressional committees were established to investigate and prevent possible subversive activities. Among these was the House Un-American Activities Committee, which conducted a series of high-profile investigations. Often characterized as "witch hunts", they aimed to identify alleged communist sympathizers and spies within American institutions.

==== Overman Committee (1918–1919) ====
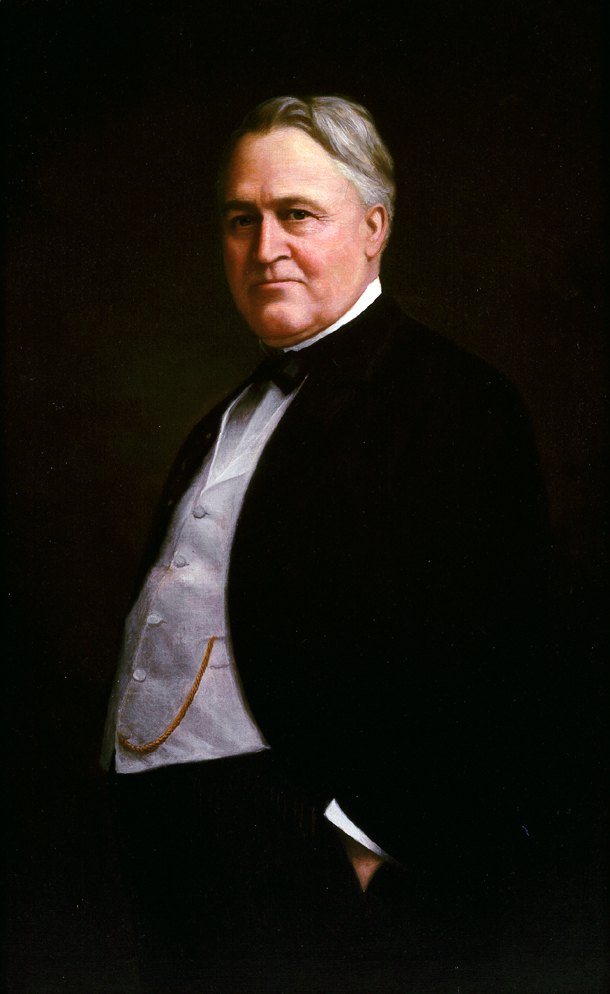
Lee Slater Overman headed the first congressional investigation of American communism in 1919.

The Overman Committee, chaired by North Carolina Democratic senator Lee Slater Overman, was a subcommittee of the Senate Judiciary Committee that operated from September 1918 to June 1919. The subcommittee investigated German as well as "Bolshevik elements" in the United States.

This subcommittee was initially concerned with investigating pro-German sentiments in the American liquor industry. After World War I ended in November 1918, and the German threat lessened, the subcommittee began investigating Bolshevism, which had appeared as a threat during the First Red Scare after the Russian Revolution in 1917. The subcommittee's hearing into Bolshevik propaganda, conducted from February 11 to March 10, 1919, played a decisive role in constructing an image of a radical threat to the United States during the first Red Scare.

==== Fish Committee (1930) ====
Congressman Hamilton Fish III (R-NY), who was a fervent anti-communist, introduced, on May 5, 1930, House Resolution 180, which proposed to establish a committee to investigate communist activities in the United States. The resulting committee, Special Committee to Investigate Communist Activities in the United States commonly known as the Fish Committee, undertook extensive investigations of people and organizations suspected of being involved with or supporting communist activities in the United States. Among the committee's targets were the American Civil Liberties Union and communist presidential candidate William Z. Foster. The committee recommended granting the United States Department of Justice more authority to investigate communists, and strengthening immigration and deportation laws to keep communists out of the United States.

==== McCormack–Dickstein Committee (1934–1937) ====
From 1934 to 1937, the committee, now named the Special Committee on Un-American Activities Authorized to Investigate Nazi Propaganda and Certain Other Propaganda Activities, chaired by John William McCormack (D-Mass.) and Samuel Dickstein (D-NY), held public and private hearings and collected testimony filling 4,300 pages. The Special Committee was widely known as the McCormack–Dickstein committee. Its mandate was to get "information on how foreign subversive propaganda entered the U.S. and the organizations that were spreading it." Its records are held by the National Archives and Records Administration as records related to HUAC.

In 1934, the Special Committee subpoenaed most of the leaders of the fascist movement in the United States. Beginning in November 1934, the committee investigated allegations of a fascist plot to seize the White House, known as the "Business Plot". Contemporary newspapers widely reported the plot as a hoax. While historians have questioned whether a coup was actually close to execution, most agree that some sort of "wild scheme" was contemplated and discussed.

It has been reported that while Dickstein served on this committee and the subsequent committee, Special Investigation, he was paid $1,250 a month by the Soviet NKVD, which sought to obtain secret congressional information on anti-communists and pro-fascists. A 1939 NKVD report stated Dickstein handed over "materials on the war budget for 1940, records of conferences of the budget sub commission, reports of the war minister, chief of staff and etc." However the NKVD was dissatisfied with the amount of information provided by Dickstein, after he was not appointed to HUAC to "carry out measures planned by us together with him." Dickstein unsuccessfully attempted to expedite the deportation of Soviet defector Walter Krivitsky, while the Dies Committee kept him in the country. Dickstein stopped receiving NKVD payments in February 1940.

==== Dies Committee (1938–1944) ====
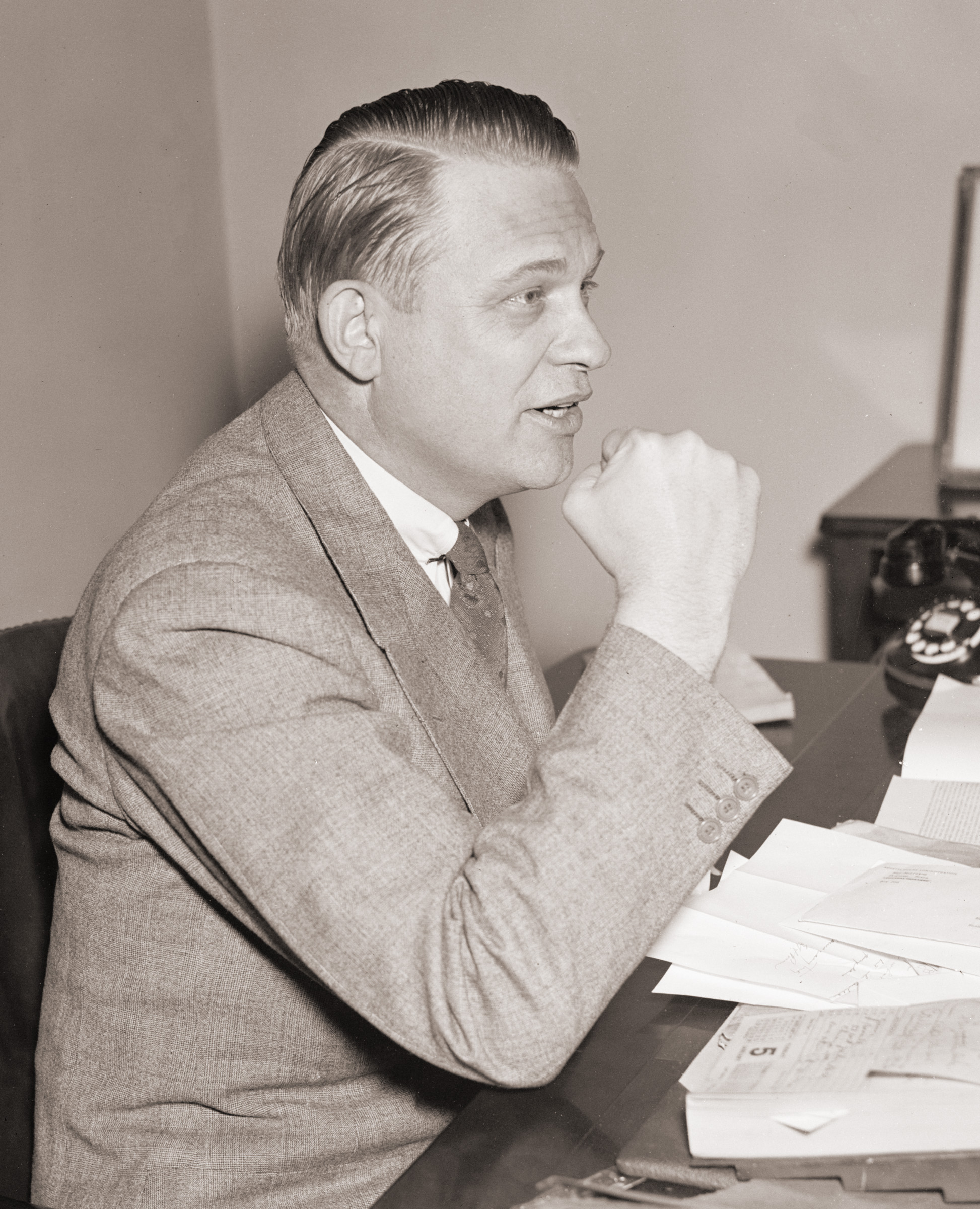
Texas Democrat Martin Dies Jr. served as chair of the Special Committee on Un-American Activities, predecessor to the permanent committee, for its entire seven-year duration.

On May 26, 1938, the House Committee on Un-American Activities was established as a special investigating committee, which was reorganized from its previous incarnations: Fish Committee and the McCormack-Dickstein Committee. The goal of this committee was to investigate alleged disloyalty and subversive activities as part of private citizens, public employees, and those organizations suspected of having communist or fascist ties. On the contrary, it concentrated its efforts on communists. It was chaired by Martin Dies Jr. (D-Tex.), and therefore known as the Dies Committee. Its records are held by the National Archives and Records Administration as records related to HUAC.

In 1938, Hallie Flanagan, the head of the Federal Theatre Project, was subpoenaed to appear before the committee to answer the charge the project was overrun with communists. Flanagan was called to testify for only a part of one day, while an administrative clerk from the project was called in for two entire days. It was during this investigation that one of the committee's members, Joe Starnes (D-Ala.), famously asked Flanagan whether the English Elizabethan era playwright Christopher Marlowe was a member of the Communist Party, and mused that ancient Greek tragedian "Mr. Euripides" preached class warfare.

In 1939, the committee investigated people involved with pro-Nazi organizations such as Oscar C. Pfaus and George Van Horn Moseley. Moseley testified before the committee for five hours about a "Jewish Communist conspiracy" to take control of the U.S. government. Moseley was supported by Donald Shea of the American Gentile League, whose statement was deleted from the public record as the committee found it so objectionable.

The committee also put together an argument for the internment of Japanese Americans known as the "Yellow Report". Organized in response to rumors of Japanese Americans being coddled by the War Relocation Authority (WRA) and news that some former inmates would be allowed to leave camp and Nisei soldiers to return to the West Coast, the committee investigated charges of fifth column activity in the camps. A number of anti-WRA arguments were presented in subsequent hearings, but Director Dillon Myer debunked the more inflammatory claims. The investigation was presented to the 77th Congress, and alleged that certain cultural traits – Japanese loyalty to the Emperor, the number of Japanese fishermen in the US, and the Buddhist faith – were evidence for Japanese espionage. With the exception of Rep. Herman Eberharter (D-Pa.), the members of the committee seemed to support internment, and its recommendations to expedite the impending segregation of "troublemakers", establish a system to investigate applicants for leave clearance, and step up Americanization and assimilation efforts largely coincided with WRA goals.

=== Standing Committee (1945–1975) ===
Democrat Francis E. Walter of Pennsylvania was chair of HUAC from 1955 until his death in 1963.

The House Committee on Un-American Activities became a standing (permanent) committee on January 3, 1945. Democratic Representative Edward J. Hart of New Jersey became the committee's first chairman. Under the mandate of Public Law 600, passed by the 83rd Congress, the committee could compel testimony " ...relating to any interference with or endangering of, or any plans or attempts to interfere with or endanger the national security or defense of the United States...". Under this mandate, the committee focused its investigations on real and suspected communists in positions of actual or supposed influence in the United States society. A significant step for HUAC was its investigation of the charges of espionage brought against Alger Hiss in 1948. This investigation ultimately resulted in Hiss's trial and conviction for perjury, and convinced many of the usefulness of congressional committees for uncovering communist subversion.

The chief investigator was Robert E. Stripling, senior investigator Louis J. Russell, and investigators Alvin Williams Stokes, Courtney E. Owens, and Donald T. Appell. The director of research was Benjamin Mandel.

In 1946, the committee considered opening investigations into the Ku Klux Klan, but decided against doing so, prompting white supremacist committee member John E. Rankin (D-Miss.) to remark, "After all, the KKK is an old American institution." Twenty years later, in 1965–1966, however, the committee did conduct an investigation into Klan activities under chairman Edwin Willis (D-La.).

=== Hollywood Blacklist ===
In 1947, the committee held nine days of hearings into alleged communist propaganda and influence in the Hollywood motion picture industry. After conviction on contempt of Congress charges for refusal to answer some questions posed by committee members, "The Hollywood Ten" were blacklisted by the industry. Eventually, more than 300 artists – including directors, radio commentators, actors, and particularly screenwriters – were boycotted by the studios. Some, like Charlie Chaplin, Orson Welles, Alan Lomax, Paul Robeson, and Yip Harburg, left the U.S. or went underground to find work. Others like Dalton Trumbo wrote under pseudonyms or the names of colleagues. Only about ten percent succeeded in rebuilding careers within the entertainment industry.

In 1947, studio executives told the committee that wartime films—such as Mission to Moscow, The North Star, and Song of Russia—could be considered pro-Soviet propaganda, but claimed that the films were valuable in the context of the Allied war effort, and that they were made (in the case of Mission to Moscow) at the request of White House officials. In response to the House investigations, most studios produced a number of anti-communist and anti-Soviet propaganda films such as The Red Menace (August 1949), The Red Danube (October 1949), The Woman on Pier 13 (October 1949), Guilty of Treason (May 1950, about the ordeal and trial of Cardinal József Mindszenty), I Was a Communist for the FBI (May 1951, Academy Award nominated for best documentary 1951, also serialized for radio), Red Planet Mars (May 1952), and John Wayne's Big Jim McLain (August 1952). Universal-International Pictures was the only major studio that did not purposefully produce such a film.

The committee conducted many investigations into the Hollywood film industry. Some people within the industry gave names of people who were allegedly communists to HUAC. In total, 43 people were summoned to testify in front of the Washington hearing. Out of those subpoenaed, only 10 refused to testify, and they were cited for contempt in front of Congress. Those 10 ended up being sentenced; one of them being Albert Maltz. Maltz had parents who were Russian immigrants, leading people to believe he was a communist. Once his name was on the Blacklist, he refused to testify in front of the Washington hearings in October. He was then convicted and was sentenced with nine other people. The other nine people included Alvah Bessie, Herbert Biberman, Lester Cole, Edward Dmytryk, Ring Lardner Jr., John Howard Lawson, Samuel Ornitz, Adrian Scott, and Dalton Trumbo.

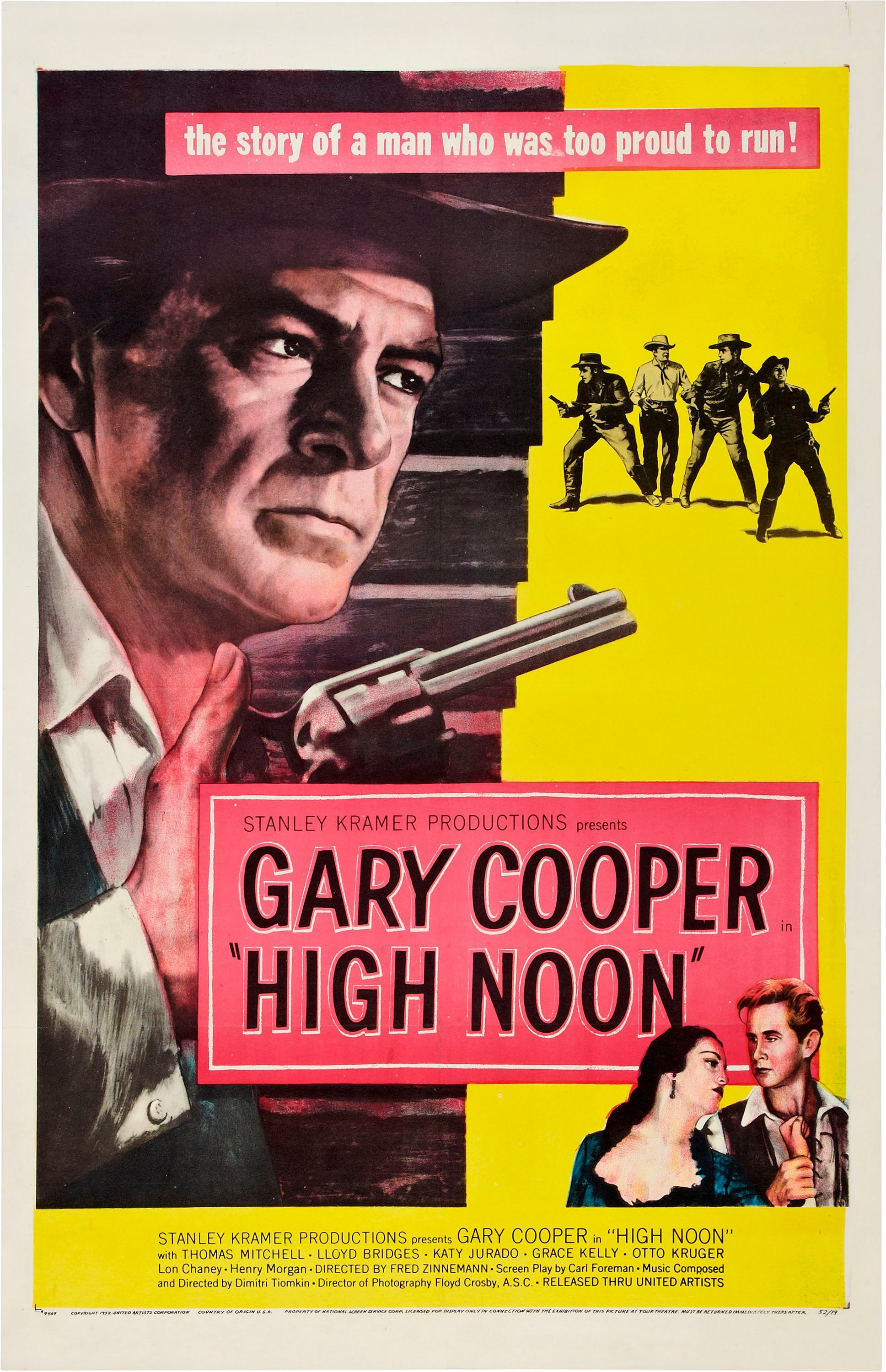
High Noon, featuring Gary Cooper, sparked the longtime debate about Hollywood Blacklisting.

High Noon (Fred Zinnemann, 1952) was overwhelmingly glorified as a classic based on the situational awareness around the House of Un-American Activities Committee. The writer of the movie, Carl Foreman, sparked controversy regarding his intended political message. High Noon was focused on Marshal Will Kane (Gary Cooper); a retiring sheriff in a small town named Hadleyville. Ultimately, he decides to postpone his retirement to combat a recently released criminal named Frank Miller (Ian MacDonald), who sought revenge over the one that incarcerated him. Kane took it upon himself to recruit help from the Hadleyville citizens for Miller's re-arrest. When the people turned him down, Kane was forced to face Miller's threat by himself. The story was widely perceived as the outward representation of a cowardly community that hides from the government and the HUAC. Concurrently, High Noon encouraged viewers to question the government's frequent speculation of its American people. Soon after the movie was released, Foreman refused to confirm or deny his involvement with the Communist Party and was blacklisted by the major Hollywood studios.

=== Labor Movement ===
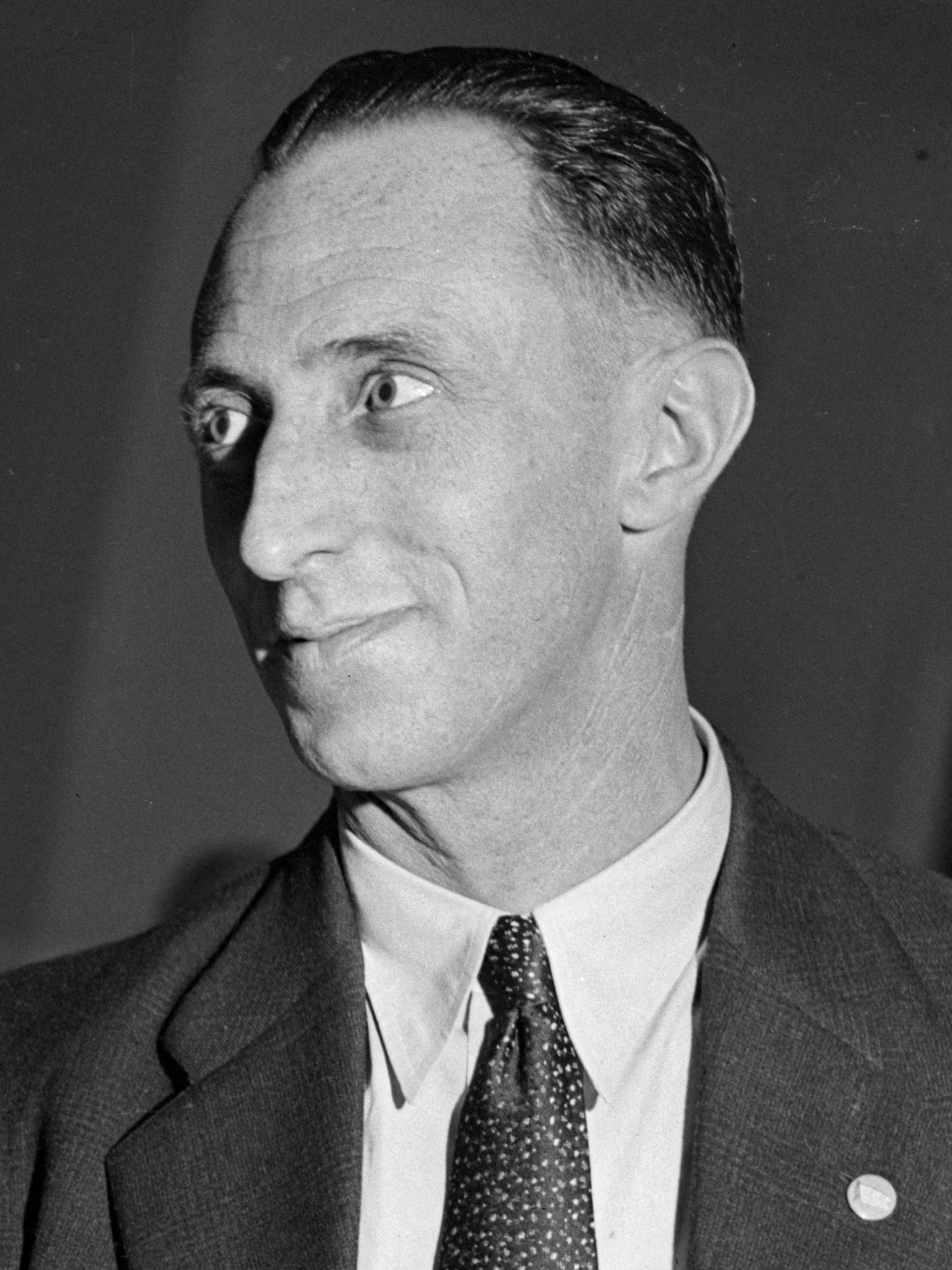
Harry Bridges, a labor union activist and founder of the ILWU, was among the targets of HUAC.

The HUAC's strict anti-communist agenda during the Red Scare primarily targeted prominent union activists and leaders within the Labor Movement. HUAC frequently attached a communist stigma to various unions' organizations and individuals, which gave them grounds for pursuit. Harry Bridges, a notable union activist and eventual union president of the International Longshore and Warehouse Union (ILWU), was a direct target of such attacks. A campaign led by the committee chairman, at the time Martin Dies, focused on deporting the Australian American union activist directly based on testimony from John Frey claiming his Communist Party associations, despite his multiple public denials of such claims. Harry Bridges did although share a close intimacy with the Communist Party by aligning himself with certain aspects and ideals commonly targeted by HUAC, giving reason for the subpoena and deportations attempts.

=== Advocacy Movement ===
Elizabeth Gurley Flynn, cofounder and board member of the American Civil Liberties Union (ACLU), was a large target of the Dies Committee. She joined the Communist Party in 1937 and was even included in the party's Central Committee the following year. Because of her political associations, she was an easy individual for HUAC to target as they could also attack the ACLU. Martin Dies decided to publicly prosecute the organization in 1939 which forced a response from the ACLU. The response came in the form of shearing any connection with the Communist Party by ridding individuals with communist ties as an attempted plea to Martin Dies. This of course included Elizabeth Gurley Flynn who was expelled from the ACLU, even after being a part of the founding committee.

=== Whittaker Chambers and Alger Hiss ===
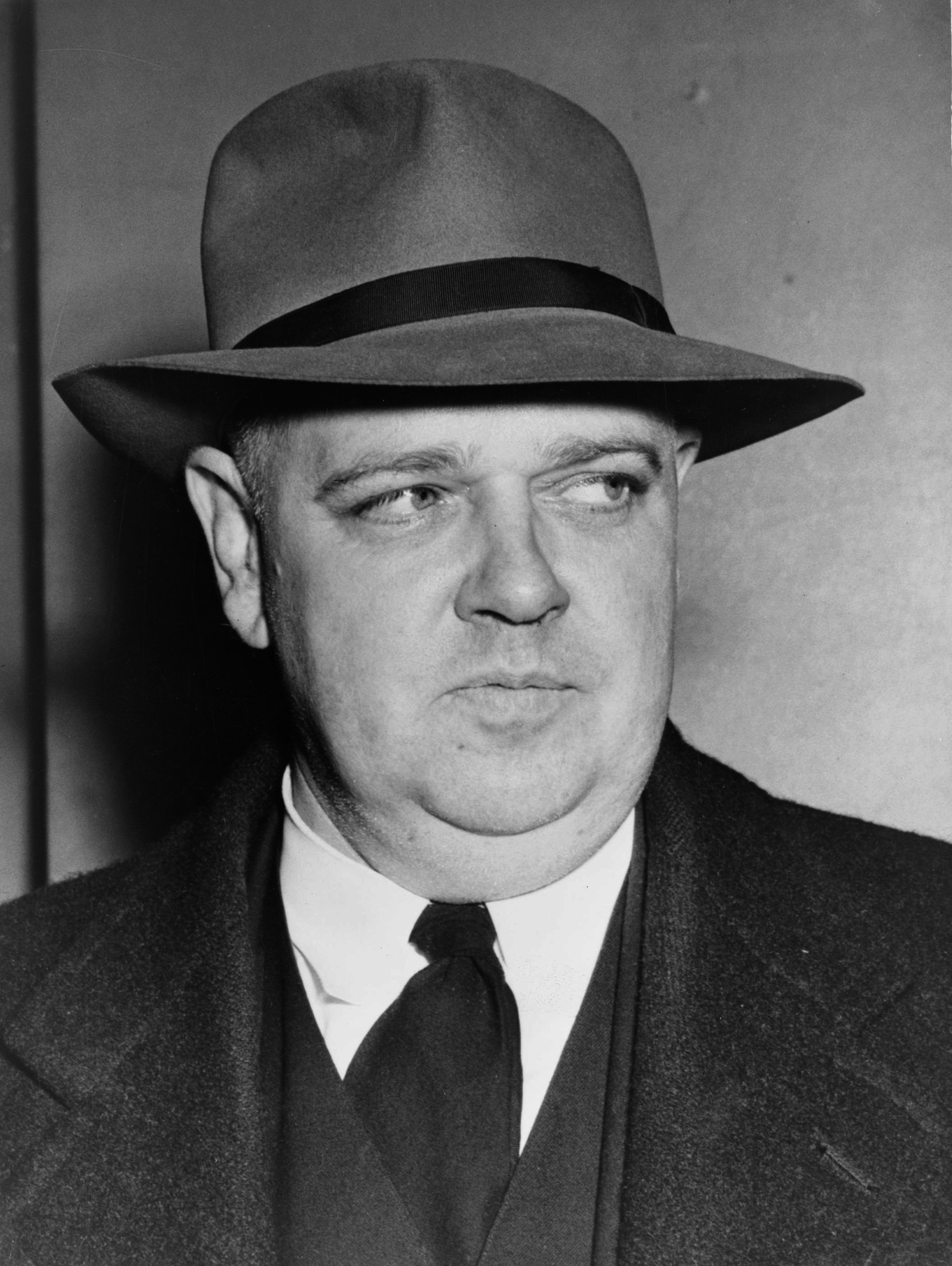
Whittaker Chambers in 1948

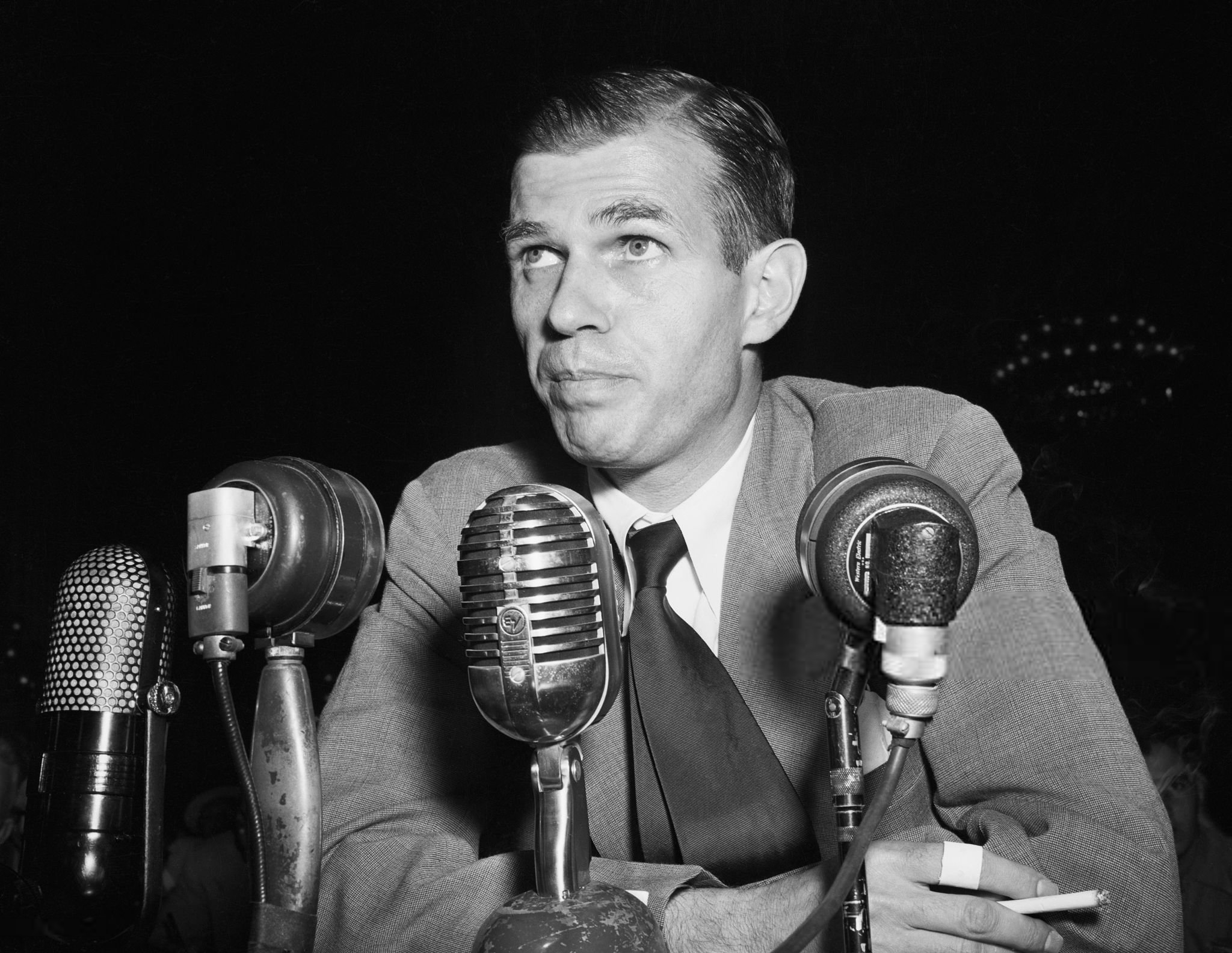
Alger Hiss in 1948

On July 31, 1948, the committee heard testimony from Elizabeth Bentley, an American who had been working as a Soviet agent in New York. Among those whom she named as communists was Harry Dexter White, a senior U.S. Treasury department official. The committee subpoenaed Whittaker Chambers on August 3, 1948. Chambers was also a Soviet spy that worked for the senior editor of Time magazine during that period.

Chambers named more than a half dozen government officials including White as well as Alger Hiss (and Hiss' brother Donald). Most of these former officials refused to answer committee questions, citing the Fifth Amendment. White denied the allegations, and died of a heart attack a few days later. Hiss also denied all charges; doubts about his testimony though, especially those expressed by freshman Congressman Richard Nixon, led to further investigation that strongly suggested Hiss had made a number of false statements.

Hiss challenged Chambers to repeat his charges outside a Congressional committee, which Chambers did. Hiss then sued for libel, leading Chambers to produce copies of State Department documents which he claimed Hiss had given him in 1938. Hiss denied this before a grand jury, was indicted for perjury, and subsequently convicted and imprisoned. The present-day House of Representatives website on HUAC states, "But in the 1990s, Soviet archives conclusively revealed that Hiss had been a spy on the Kremlin's payroll." However, in the 1990s, senior Soviet intelligence officials, after consulting their archive, stated they found nothing to support that theory. In 1995, the National Security Agency's Venona papers were alleged to have provided overwhelming evidence that Hiss was a spy, but the same evidence is also judged to be not only not overwhelming but entirely circumstantial. As a result, and also given how many documents remain classified, it is unlikely that a truly conclusive answer will ever be reached.

=== Ku Klux Klan (KKK) ===
In 1965, Klan violence prompted President Lyndon B. Johnson and Georgia congressman Charles L. Weltner to call for a congressional probe of the Ku Klux Klan. The resulting investigation resulted in numerous Klansmen remaining silent and giving evasive answers. The House of Representatives voted to cite seven Klan leaders, including Robert Shelton, for contempt of Congress for refusing to turn over Klan records. Shelton was found guilty and sentenced to one year in prison plus a $1,000 fine. Following his conviction, three other Klan leaders, Robert Scoggin, Bob Jones, and Calvin Craig, pleaded guilty. Scoggin and Jones were each sentenced to one year in prison, while Craig was fined $1,000. The charges against Marshall Kornegay, Robert Hudgins, and George Dorsett were later dropped.

=== Growing opposition ===
Democrat Richard Howard Ichord Jr. of Missouri was chair of the renamed House Internal Security Committee from 1969 until its termination in January 1975.

The HUAC's prestige began declining in the late 1950s after the censure of Joseph McCarthy; a U.S. Senator who never served in the House or for the HUAC. The committee was denounced by former President Harry S. Truman in 1959, and he labeled it as the "most un-American thing in the country today".

==== 1960 San Francisco hearing and protest ====
In May 1960, the committee held hearings in San Francisco City Hall which led to a riot on May 13, where the city police officers fire-hosed protesting students from UC Berkeley, Stanford, and other local colleges. They dragged these students down the marble steps, beneath the rotunda, and left some seriously injured. Soviet affairs expert William Mandel, who had been subpoenaed to testify, angrily denounced the committee and the police in a blistering statement which was aired repeatedly for years thereafter on Pacifica Radio station KPFA in Berkeley. An anti-communist propaganda film, Operation Abolition, was produced by the committee from subpoenaed local news reports, and shown around the country during 1960 and 1961. In response, the Northern California ACLU produced a film called Operation Correction, which discussed falsehoods in the first film. Scenes from the hearings and protest were later featured in the Academy Award-nominated 1990 documentary Berkeley in the Sixties. Women Strike for Peace also protested against HUAC at this time.

==== Yippies and Vietnam War protests ====
The committee lost considerable prestige as the 1960s progressed, increasingly becoming the target of political satirists and the defiance of a new generation of political activists. HUAC subpoenaed Jerry Rubin and Abbie Hoffman of the Yippies in 1967, and again in the aftermath of the 1968 Democratic National Convention. The Yippies used the media attention to make a mockery of the proceedings. Rubin came to one session dressed as a Revolutionary War soldier and passed out copies of the United States Declaration of Independence to those in attendance. Rubin then "blew giant gum bubbles, while his co-witnesses taunted the committee with Nazi salutes". Rubin attended another session dressed as Santa Claus. On another occasion, police stopped Hoffman at the building entrance and arrested him for wearing the United States flag. Hoffman quipped to the press, "I regret that I have but one shirt to give for my country", paraphrasing the last words of revolutionary patriot Nathan Hale; Rubin, who was wearing a matching Viet Cong flag, shouted that the police were communists for not arresting him as well.

Hearings in August 1966 called to investigate anti-Vietnam War activities were disrupted by hundreds of protesters, many from the Progressive Labor Party. The committee faced witnesses who were openly defiant.

According to The Harvard Crimson:

In the fifties, the most effective sanction was terror. Almost any publicity from HUAC meant the 'blacklist'. Without a chance to clear his name, a witness would suddenly find himself without friends and without a job. But it is not easy to see how in 1969, a HUAC blacklist could terrorize an SDS activist. Witnesses like Jerry Rubin have openly boasted of their contempt for American institutions. A subpoena from HUAC would be unlikely to scandalize Abbie Hoffman or his friends.

In an attempt to reinvent itself, the committee was renamed as the Internal Security Committee in 1969.

=== Termination ===
The House Committee on Internal Security was formally terminated on January 14, 1975, the day of the opening of the 94th Congress. The committee's files and staff were transferred on that day to the House Judiciary Committee.

== Chairmen ==
- Martin Dies Jr., (D-Tex.), 1938–1944
- Edward J. Hart (D-N.J.), 1945–1946
- J. Parnell Thomas (R-N.J.), 1947–1948
- John Stephens Wood (D-Ga.), 1949–1953
- Harold H. Velde (R-Ill.), 1953–1955
- Francis E. Walter (D-Pa.), 1955–1963
- Edwin E. Willis (D-La.), 1963–1969
- Richard Howard Ichord Jr. (D-Mo.), 1969–1975

== Notable members ==
- Felix Edward Hébert
- Donald L. Jackson
- Noah M. Mason
- Karl E. Mundt
- Richard Nixon
- John E. Rankin
- Gordon H. Scherer
- Richard B. Vail
- Jerry Voorhis

== Context ==
Members of the New York Teachers Union noted in 1948:

Not the least dangerous aspect of the effect of the Un-American Committee is the pattern it has set for similar committees in various states. State legislatures in Illinois, Indiana, Michigan, Washington, California and elsewhere have set up similar committees. The most notorious of these committees is the Tenney Committee in California. It has sought to enad fifteen bills Interfering with the freedom of teachers and students, among them a proposal to ban from the curriculum all "politically controversial subjects." The Callahan Committee In Michigan has terrorized students and teachers. A good commentary on the thinking of some of our investigators is furnished In this Incident related by a Michigan student.

United States committees that investigated people for treason between World War II and the start of the Cold War have included:

State Committees;

- "Tenney Committee" or California Senate Factfinding Subcommittee on Un-American Activities (CUAC) (1941-1947)
- "Callahan Committee" or Michigan Legislature Committee on Un-American Activities (1947)
- Canwell Committee or Washington state Interim Committee on Un-American Activities or Joint Legislative Fact-Finding Committee on Un-American Activities (1947-1949)
- "Ober Committee" or "Ober Commission" or Maryland Commission on Subversive Activities (1948)

Federal Committees;

- "Dies Committee" or Special Committee on Un-American Activities (1938–1944)
- HUAC or Standing House Committee on Un-American Activities (1945–1975)

== See also ==
- California Senate Factfinding Subcommittee on Un-American Activities
- Defending Dissent Foundation
- Edith Alice Macia
- Edward S. Montgomery
- J. Edgar Hoover
- Jack Moffitt (screenwriter)
- Loyalty oath
- Lusk Committee
- Manning Johnson
- McCarthyism and antisemitism
- McCarran Internal Security Act
- Mundt–Ferguson Communist Registration Bill
- Mundt–Nixon Bill
- Red-baiting
- Subversive Activities Control Board
- Wilkinson v. United States
