= Corail =

Corail may refer to:

- Corail (train), an SNCF service train in France
- Corail Arrondissement, an administrative division in Grand'Anse, Haiti
  - Corail, Grand'Anse, a commune in Corail Arrondissement
    - Corail City, the principal town of Corail
- The Pinova apple cultivar, also known as Corail

== See also ==
- Korail, a South Korean train operator
