= Robert E. Stripling =

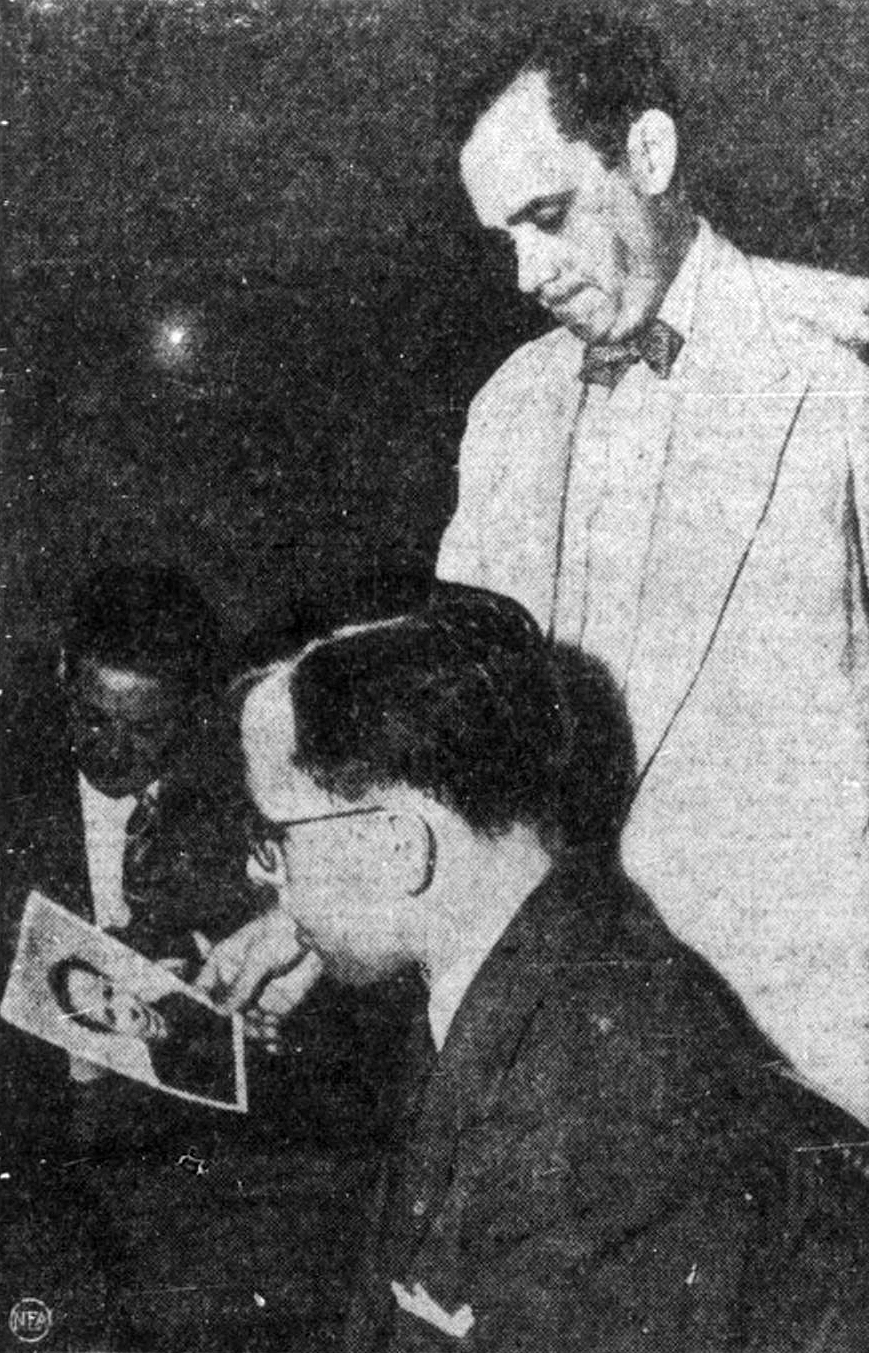
Stripling (standing) shows Duncan Lee a picture of Jacob Golos during questioning before the House Un-American Activities Committee, 1948

Robert E. Stripling (October 17, 1912 – February 3, 1991) was a 20th-century civil servant, best known as chief investigator of the House Dies Committee and its successor the House Un-American Activities Committee (HUAC), particularly for collaboration with junior congressman Richard Nixon and for testimony gleaned from witness Elizabeth Bentley and Whittaker Chambers, the latter of whose allegations led indirectly to indictment and conviction of State Department official Alger Hiss in January 1950.

== Background ==
Robert E. Stripling Jr. was born in 1912 in San Augustine, Texas. He attended the University of Texas.

== Career ==
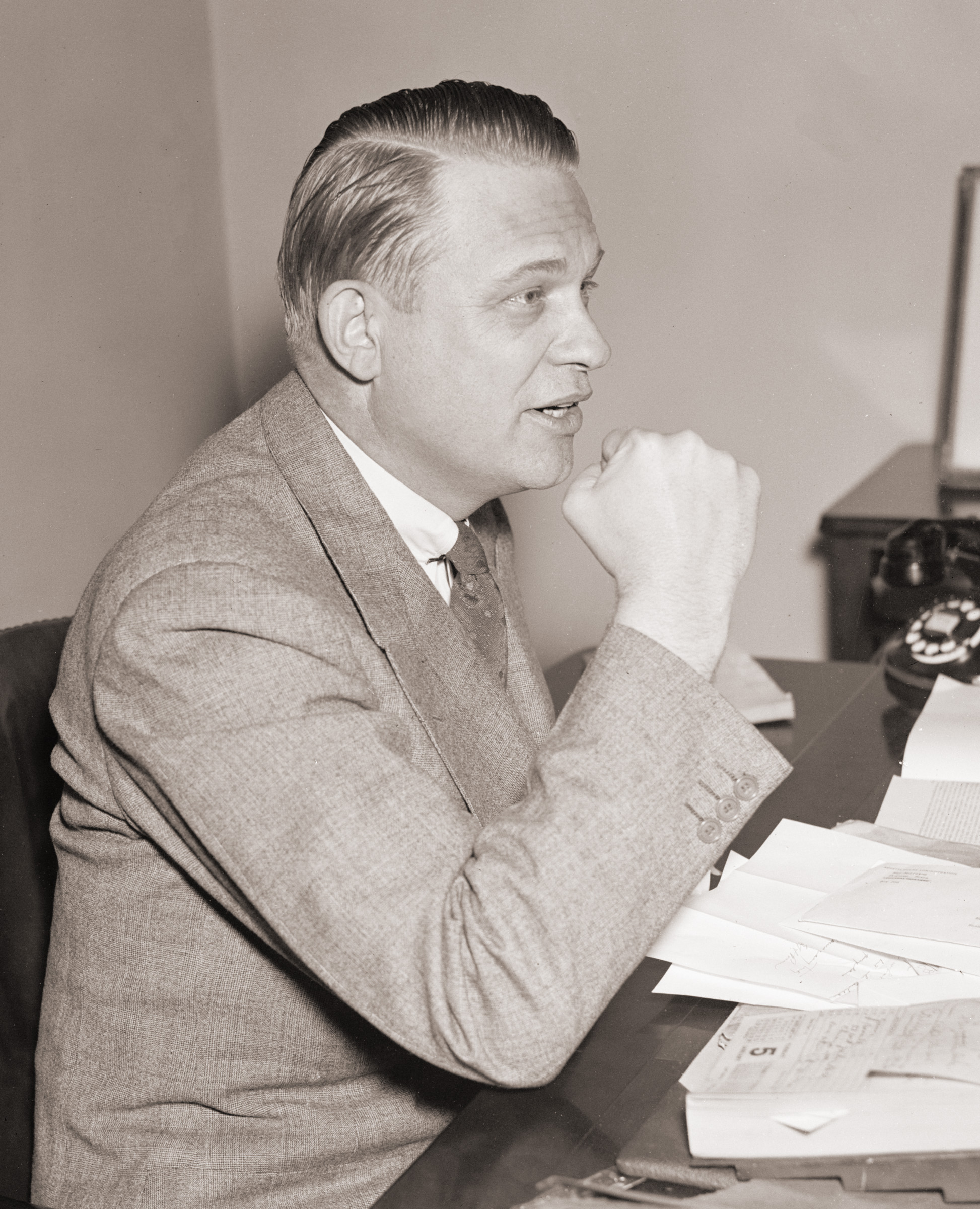
Martin Dies Jr. brought Stripling to Washington.

In 1932, before Stripling had finished college, U.S. Representative Martin Dies Jr., a Democrat from the Texas's 2nd congressional district, brought him to Washington, DC. Stripling had received what he himself called a "patronage job" in the "folding room" of the Old House Office Building at $120 per month while he attended night school.

When the Dies Committee ran out of funding, Stripling helped persuade Dies to continue by offering to serve as secretary without wages. For the next decade, the committee recovered and grew to a staff of 75 and more than one million names, records, and data related to subversion, among which Stripling named the Pumpkin Papers of Whittaker Chambers.

The cover of the original print run of Stripling's memoir The Red Plot Against America cites his title as "Chief Investigator, House Un-American Activities Committee, 1938–1948." However, some sources call him "permanent counsel" and "chief of staff."

HUAC investigations in which Stripling participated include: testimony of alleged Soviet spy Gerhart Eisler, the Hollywood Trials (which derived from Eisler through his brother Hanns Eisler, a Hollywood composer at the time, and their friend Bertolt Brecht), testimony by writer Ring Lardner Jr., testimony by Elizabeth Bentley, and testimony by Whittaker Chambers and members of his Ware Group – Alger Hiss, Donald Hiss, Harry Dexter White, Lee Pressman, John Abt, Nathan Witt, Charles Kramer, studio mogul Jack L. Warner, and others.

On December 7, 1948, Stripling testified before HUAC in the Hiss Case.

== Personal and death ==
In 1971, Stripling married Louisa Fowler Shankland (previously married to Robert J. Zonne in 1948).

Stripling died in 1991.

== Legacy ==
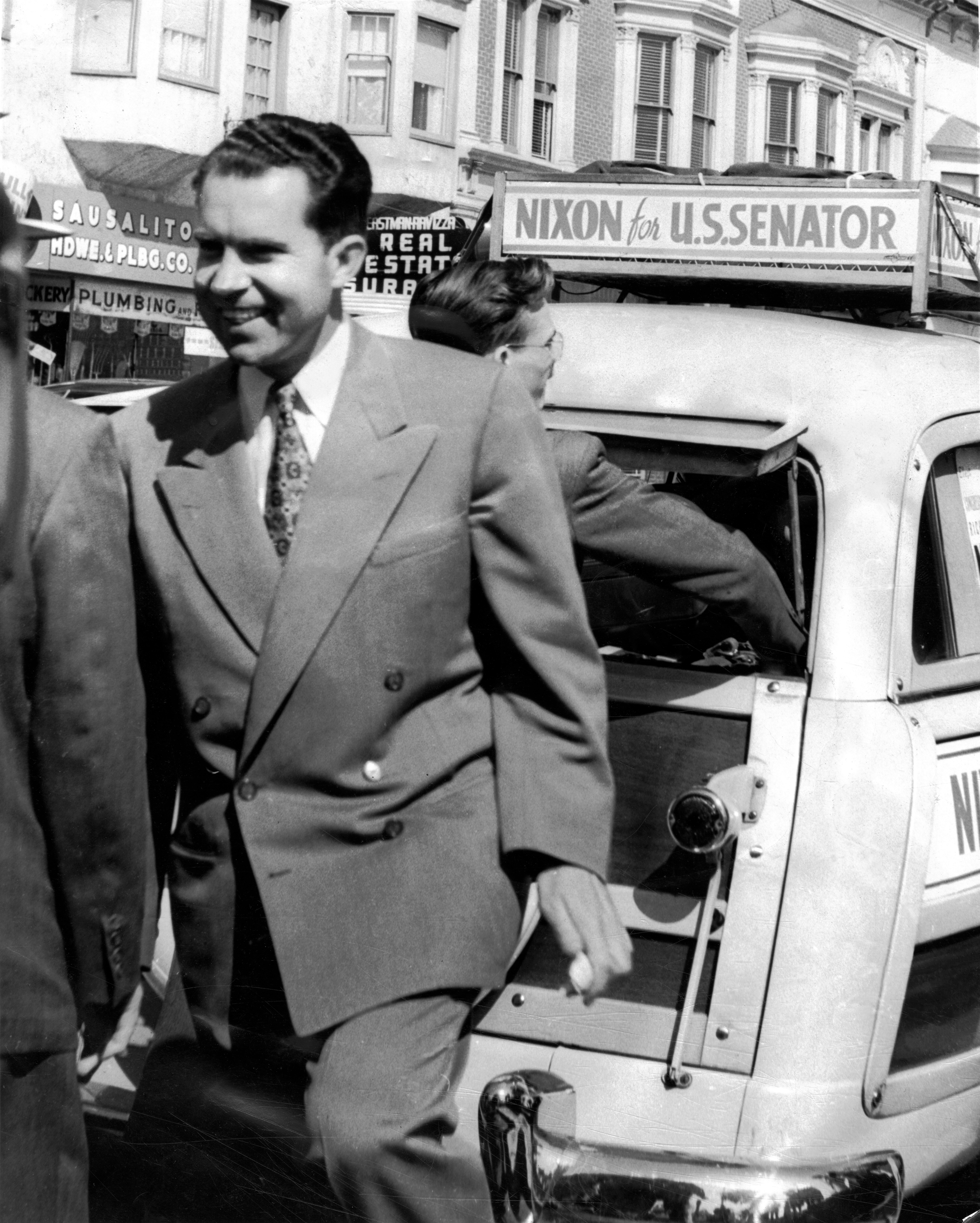
Richard Nixon rose to fame in 1948 with Stripling's help in investigating Alger Hiss and others

Stripling's collaboration with first-term U.S. Representative Nixon and their success in 1948 that lead to the Hiss Case (1949) proved the stepping stone to Nixon's rise to U.S. Senator (1950), U.S. Vice President (1952), and later U.S. President (1968).

Stripling appears in film in at least two documentaries regarding HUAC investigations.

== Works ==
One of the few mentions (much less reviews) of Stripling's book lumps it with several others about the House Un-American Activities Committee and states "They weren’t good books."

- The Red Plot Against America, edited by Bob Considine (Drexel Hill, PA: Bell Publishing: 1949)

== See also ==
- Dies Committee
- Martin Dies Jr.
- House Un-American Activities Committee
- Richard Nixon
- Elizabeth Bentley
- Whittaker Chambers
- Alger Hiss
