= Helen Koral =

American spy for Soviet Union

Helen Koral was the wife of Alexander Koral. Both were Americans who, allegedly, worked for Soviet intelligence during World War II. The Koral's headed the "Art" or "Berg" group of Soviet spies. The Berg group acted as couriers for various Soviet contacts, including the Silvermaster ring. Helen Koral received a regular stipend of $100 per month from the KGB and work closely with Helen Lowry, the wife of Iskhak Akhmerov, the KGB Illegal Rezident during World War II. Her code name in the Soviet intelligence according to materials from the Venona project was "Miranda", and later changed to "Art".

== Venona ==
- 1251 KGB New York to Moscow, 2 September 1944;
- 1524 KGB New York to Moscow, 27 October 1944;
- 1582 KGB New York to Moscow, 12 November 1944;
- 1636 KGB New York to Moscow, 21 November 1944;
- 1791 KGB New York to Moscow, 20 December 1944;
- 1052 KGB New York to Moscow, 5 July 1945;
- 337 KGB Moscow to New York, 8 April 1945.
