= Korall =

Russian cheese

Korall (Russian: Коралл) is a Russian processed cheese with a shrimp flavoring. The cheese production began in Soviet times. Today the brand has no single owner, and is produced by several companies.

The cheese is characteristically pink and is soft. Spices are often added to the cheese, just as black pepper to accompany the taste of shrimp and black pepper. Korall contains 60% fat and no more than 2% salt, and around 10% protein fish paste. On the cover of the white polystyrene boxes it is sold in is the image of a crayfish and it is packaged in boxes of 50, 100, 150, 200 and 250 g, as well as in tubes.
