= Alvin Williams Stokes =

African-American investigator for the federal government

- Born: December 4, 1904; New York City, New York, U.S.
- Died: June 20, 1982 (aged 77); Westwood, New Jersey, U.S.
- Occupation: HUAC investigator
- Known for: Investigation into Paul Robeson and Communist Party USA and African Americans

Alvin William Stokes (December 4, 1904 - June 20, 1982) was a 20th-century African-American civil servant, best known as an investigator for the House Un-American Activities Committee (HUAC).

== Background ==
Alvin W. Stokes was born on December 4, 1904, in New York City.

== Career ==
From 1935 to 1940, Stokes served chief administrative officer and secretary to three Bergen County sheriffs, as well as the first ever black member of the Bergen County Republican Committee.

From 1945 to 1954, Stokes served as an investigator for the House Un-American Activities Committee (HUAC).

In 1949, Stokes led as first witness into HUAC hearings on "Communist Infiltration of Minority Groups." He stated:

In the course of my investigations, I have interviewed hundreds of Negro leaders in every walk of life. On the basis of these interviews and committee records, I can report that hardly more than 1,400 Negroes, or one-tenth of 1 percent of the entire Negro population of the United States, are members of the Communist Party. This in spite of the fact that they have been and are the target of constant and relentless Communist propaganda.

After praising the efforts of the NAACP and Urban League, Stokes launched into his findings on Paul Robeson. Of particular concern to HUAC (discerned from repeated questions to most witnesses during this set of hearings) was a "welcome home rally" for Robeson at Rockland Palace in New York City on June 19, 1949, sponsored by the Council on African Affairs (on the 1947 AGLOSO); Stokes had attended the rally. Robeson had just returned from what Stokes describes as a "Communist-inspired" World Peace Conference in Paris on April 20, 1949. Stokes paraphrase Robeson as saying, "It is unthinkable that American Negroes or Negroes anywhere would go to war on behalf of those who have oppressed us for generations, against a country which in one generation has raised our people to the full dignity of mankind." Stokes said that only a quarter of the audience of some 5,000 were African-Americans and claimed that "The rest were the usual ragtag and bobtail of the Communist Party." Stokes did not relate the gist of Robeson's speech, though he claimed that "Mr. Robeson's voice was the voice of the Kremlin." He then cited a survey of 1,000 citizens in 7 cities that he claimed showed that Robeson was having effect on the American population. When questioned, Stokes admitted that there was no direct link between the Party and race riots in Detroit (apparently referring to the 1943 Detroit race riot). Stokes could not testify whether Robeson was in fact a member of the Communist Party, but another witness in that series of hearings, Manning Johnson, testified that Robeson was a secret Communist. (During those same hearings, Manning Johnson also said of Stokes "He talked to us in New York about 2 years ago and convinced me I should take part before this committee.")

In 1950, Stokes reported to fellow HUAC investigator Louis J. Russell on William Remington (accused by Elizabeth Bentley of Soviet espionage).

Once, Stokes entered the dressing room of Lena Horne as part of HUAC investigations into Communist infiltration in Hollywood. Horne told him, how could a Negro work for such an organization as HUAC?

In 1968, Stokes served as co-chair on an advisory committee to New Jersey Citizens for Richard M. Nixon during the 1968 United States presidential election.

== Personal life and death ==
Stokes married Rachel Stokes and had a son, Alvin Williams Stokes Jr.

Stokes died age 78 on June 20, 1982, at his home in Westwood, New Jersey.

== See also ==
- Jacob Spolansky
- Louis J. Russell
- House Un-American Activities Committee
- Paul Robeson
- Communist Party USA and African Americans
