= List of Communist Party USA members who have held office in the United States =

Communist Party USA members who have held public office

This is a list of American politicians who are members of the Communist Party USA (CPUSA) and who have held elected office in the United States. CPUSA has run candidates on an explicit Communist ticket, on tickets of third parties (such as the Nonpartisan League), and on Democratic tickets. See also: List of Communist Party USA election results.

== History ==
In a 1934 Daily Worker article, the Communist Party claimed that "party candidates" had won office in a dozen communities, including two mayors (Emil Nygard of Crosby, Minnesota and Bill Young of Platte Township, Michigan) and several councilmen. By 1964 however, the party claimed only three "party candidates": New York City Councilmen Peter V. Cacchione and Benjamin J. Davis Jr., and "a mayor in a Montana community no longer recalled."

== Federal officials ==
As of 2026, two Communist Party members have been elected to office in the federal government.

=== Lower houses ===
==== Former (2) ====
Name	District	State	Office	Term start	Term end	Notes	Ref
Hugh De Lacy	WA-01	Washington	House of Representatives	January 3, 1945	January 3, 1947	ran as Democratic Party candidate, but not open Communist	
John Bernard	MN-08	Minnesota	House of Representatives	January 3, 1937	January 3, 1939	ran as Farmer–Labor Party candidate, future Communist	

== State officials ==
As of 2026, eleven Communist Party members have been elected to office in a state government.

=== Upper houses ===
==== Former (1) ====
Name	District	State	Office	Term start	Term end	Notes	Ref
Charles E. Taylor	Sheridan County	Montana	Senate	January 1, 1923	January 5, 1931	ran as Montana Farmer-Labor Party candidate, but not open Communist	

=== Lower houses ===
==== Former (10) ====
Name	District	State	Office	Term start	Term end	Notes	Ref
William J. Pennock	35th	Washington	House of Representatives	January 9, 1939	January 13, 1947	ran as Democratic Party candidate, but not open Communist	
Kathryn Fogg	31st	Washington	House of Representatives	January 9, 1939	January 13, 1941	ran as Democratic Party candidate, but not open Communist	
Ellsworth C. Wills	34th	Washington	House of Representatives	January 9, 1939	January 13, 1941	ran as Democratic Party candidate, but not open Communist	
H. C. Armstrong	33rd	Washington	House of Representatives	January 11, 1937	January 10, 1949	ran as Democratic Party candidate, but not open Communist	
A. C. Miller	41st	North Dakota	House of Representatives	January 6, 1925	January 4, 1927	ran as Nonpartisan League candidate, open Workers Party member	
Robert Larson	Sheridan County	Montana	House of Representatives	January 5, 1925	January 7, 1929	ran as Farmer–Labor Party candidate, but not open Communist	
Clair Stoner	Sheridan County	Montana	House of Representatives	January 3, 1921	January 5, 1925	ran as Democratic-Republican-Nonpartisan League candidate, but not open Communist	
William F. Dunne	Silver Bow County	Montana	House of Representatives	January 6, 1919	January 3, 1921	ran as Democratic-Nonpartisan League candidate, future Communist	
Benjamin Gitlow	3rd Bronx	New York	State Assembly	January 1, 1918	December 31, 1918	ran as Socialist Party candidate, future Communist	
Seymour Stedman	13th	Illinois	House of Representatives	January 8, 1913	January 6, 1915	ran as Socialist Party candidate, future Communist	

== Local officials ==
As of 2026, twenty-four Communist Party members have been elected to a mayor's, city council, or other office.

=== Mayors ===
==== Former (2) ====
Name	State	Area	Office	District	Term start	Term end	Notes	Ref
Bill Young	Michigan	Platte	Mayor	At-Large	1934			
Karl Emil Nygard	Minnesota	Crosby	Mayor (Note: Called "President of the Village Council".)	At-Large	January 3, 1933	January 2, 1934		

=== City and county councils ===
==== Current (2) ====
Name	State	Area	Office	District	Term start	Term end	Notes	Ref
Hannah Shvets	New York	Ithaca	Common Council	Ward 5	January 2026	January 2030	ran as Democratic Party candidate, open Communist Party member	
Daniel Carson	Maine	Bangor	City Council	At-large	January 2026	January 2029	nonpartisan election	

==== Former (14) ====
Name	State	Area	Office	District	Term start	Term end	Notes	Ref
Christopher Semok	Montana	Columbia Falls	City Council	At-Large	January 2026	July 2026	nonpartisan election; resigned	
Denise Winebrenner Edwards	Pennsylvania	Wilkinsburg	Borough Council	Ward 3	January 2018	January 2024	ran as Democratic Party candidate, but also open Communist Party member	
Wahsayah Whitebird	Wisconsin	Ashland	City Council	Ward 6	April 17, 2019	April 17, 2021		
Denise Winebrenner Edwards	Pennsylvania	Wilkinsburg	Borough Council	Ward 3	January 1998	January 2010	ran as Democratic Party candidate, but also open Communist Party member	
Kenny Jones	Missouri	St. Louis	Board of Aldermen	Ward 22	1983	2002		
Benjamin J. Davis Jr.	New York	New York City	City Council	Manhattan At-large	January 1, 1944	November 29, 1949		
Peter Cacchione	New York	New York City	City Council	Brooklyn At-large	January 1, 1942	November 6, 1947	first open member of the Communist Party elected to public office in the state of New York	
Hugh De Lacy	Washington	Seattle	City Council	At-large	June 7, 1937	May 28, 1940	ran as Democratic Party candidate, but not open Communist	
Frank Mucci	Illinois	Taylor Springs	Village Board		1934	1938		
Frank Panscik	Illinois	Taylor Springs	Village Board		1934	1936		
Frank Prickett	Illinois	Taylor Springs	Village Board		1934	1935		
Andy Psak	Illinois	Taylor Springs	Village Board		1934			
Andy Gricevich	Illinois	Benld	City Council		1934			
Peter Smilovich	Minnesota	Trommald	Village Council		c. 1932			
John Buksa Jr.	Ohio	Yorkville	City Council		c. 1931	c. 1941	ran as Independent candidate, open Communist Party member	

=== Other local officials ===
==== Current (1) ====
Name	State	Area	Office	District	Term start	Term end	Notes	Ref
Luisa de Paula Santos	Massachusetts	Cambridge	School Committee	At-large	January 2026	January 2028	nonpartisan election	

==== Former (3) ====
Name	State	Area	Office	District	Term start	Term end	Notes	Ref
Steve McKiddy	Kentucky	Carpenter	School Board		1932			
Rodney Salisbury	Montana	Sheridan County	Sheriff	At-Large	1922	1928	ran as Montana Farmer-Labor Party candidate, but not open Communist	
Hans Rasmussen	Montana	Sheridan County	Surveyor	At-Large	1922	1928	ran as Montana Farmer-Labor Party candidate, but not open Communist	

== See also ==
- Other lists:
  - List of socialist members of the United States Congress
  - List of elected socialist mayors in the United States
  - List of Democratic Socialists of America public officeholders
  - List of Green politicians who have held office in the United States
- History of the socialist movement in the United States
- History of the Communist Party USA
- Kshama Sawant, a former Seattle City Councilmember and member of Socialist Alternative, a Trotskyist political party
- Lee J. Carter, a former Virginia State Delegate who identifies as a communist
- Sammie Abbott, a self-described Marxist who was elected Mayor of Takoma Park, Maryland in 1980
- Jesse Gray, a New York State Assemblyman who supported some Communists in elections and was alleged to have organized the CPUSA in Harlem
- Washington State Senators N. P. Atkinson, Ernest Thor Olson and Thomas C. Rabbitt, and Washington State Representatives Emma Taylor Harman, George S. Hurley, Michael B. Smith and Pearl Thrasher, state legislators who, like Pennock, were named as party members, but were never proven to be
- Lenus Westman, a former member of the Communist Party who was elected to the Washington State Senate but was denied his seat
- Si Gerson, who became the first Communist to hold any appointed office in New York City when he was appointed Confidential Examiner to the Borough President of Manhattan in 1938
- Anna Louise Strong, a Seattle School Board member who supported the Soviet Union and the People's Republic of China
- George W. Albright, a Reconstruction era Mississippi State Senator who abandoned the Republican Party and praised the Communist Party for nominating a black man, James W. Ford, for Vice President
- Joseph Weydemeyer, an early associate of Karl Marx who was elected St. Louis County Auditor in 1865
- August Willich, an early associate of Karl Marx who was elected Hamilton County Auditor in 1866
