= Terry Pettus =

American journalist

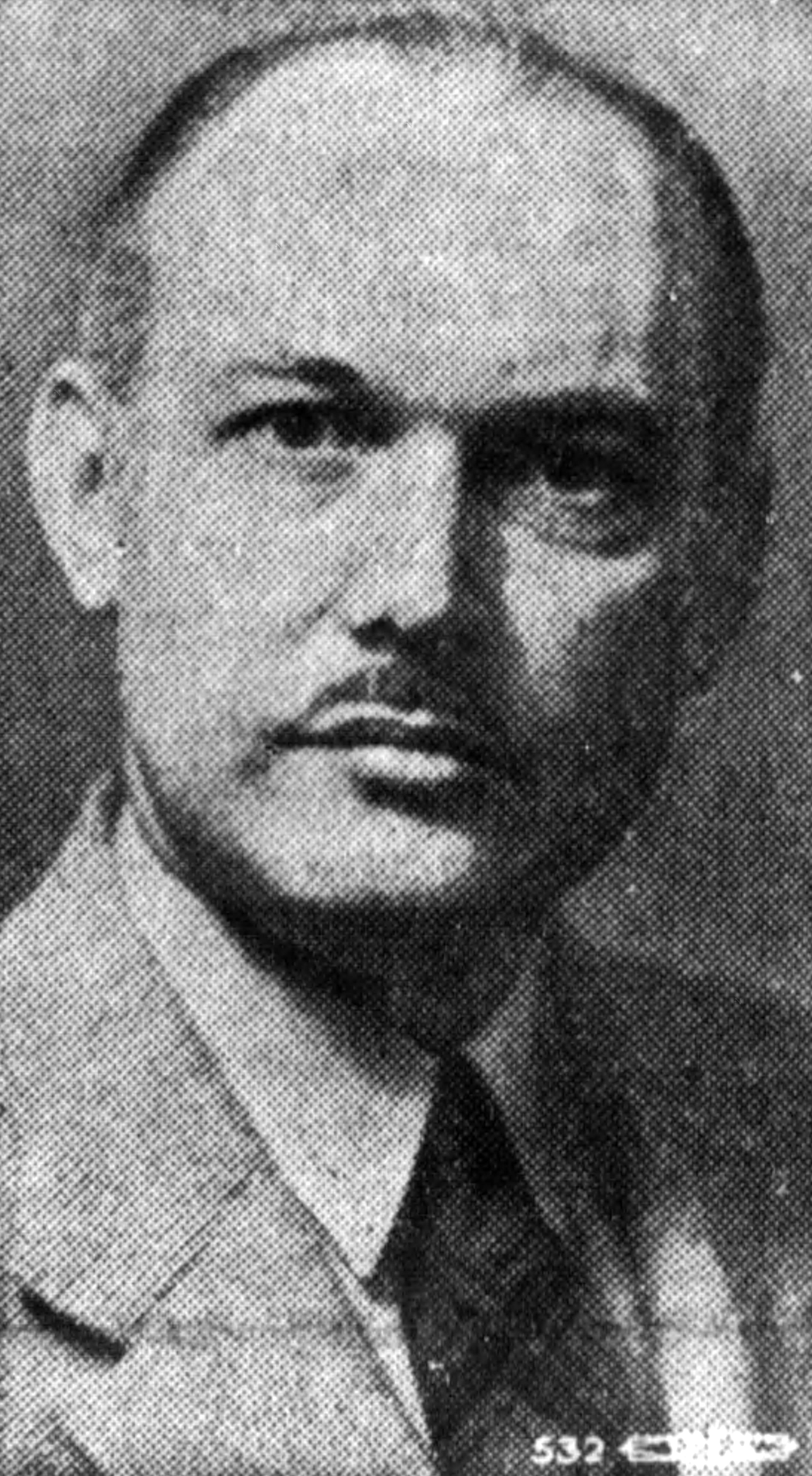
Pettus c. 1944

Terry Pettus (August 15, 1904 – October 6, 1984) was a newspaper reporter and activist from Seattle, Washington.

== Background ==
Meredith Burrus Terry Pettus was born on August 15, 1904, in Terre Haute, Indiana. His father was a Christian Socialist.

== Career ==
Pettus worked briefly as a reporter in Minneapolis and in Grand Forks, North Dakota, before moving to Seattle with his wife Berta in 1927. Shortly after arrival in Seattle, they lodged with artist Kenneth Callahan; Pettus went to work for the Seattle Star.

In 1935, as a reporter for the Tacoma Tribune he became Washington State's first member of the American Newspaper Guild. In February 1936 he was asked by the Guild to organize its Seattle chapter. By the end of the year, this had led to the first successful strike to gain union recognition for workers at a Hearst newspaper (the Seattle Post-Intelligencer). (David Selvin of the Pacific Coast Labor Bureau also played a key role in these events.) The Tacoma Tribune closed its doors shortly thereafter.

Pettus worked for a time in South Bend, Washington, editing the Willapa Harbor Pilot and becoming involved with the left-wing Washington Commonwealth Federation, initially in a drive for public power. Increasingly radicalized by the Great Depression, in 1938 Pettus joined the Communist Party USA (CPUSA). He became editor of the Commonwealth Federation's Washington New Dealer (from 1943 New World). When he tried to enlist to serve in World War II, he was rejected because this work was considered essential to the war effort.

In 1946, Pettus ran unsuccessfully for Seattle City Council, finishing last in a field of six contending for three seats.

As a journalist, he campaigned against exclusionary covenants in housing.

On January 27, 1948, Pettus disrupted the first witness of Canwell Committee hearings into Communist infiltration in the State of Washington. The witness was Louis F. Budenz, managing editor of the Communist Party's official organ, the Daily Worker. In that role, Budenz claimed to have heard of Pettus and to know of his newspaper the New World (previously the Washington New Dealer). As soon as Budenz started talking about Communist newspapers in Seattle, Pettus tried to interrupt him. When Budenz stated "The New World is absolutely controlled by the political committee of the Communist Party," Terry Pettus finally made it onto the hearing's transcript, stating, "That is a lie, as the editor of that paper--" Budenz also said that Jack Stachel had told him about Pettus, editor and comrade.

In February 1948, Pettus was named as a member of the Communist Party by former head of the Washington Commonwealth Federation Howard Costigan in testimony before the Canwell Committee of the Washington State Legislature.

Blacklisted in the McCarthy Era at the start of the Cold War, Pettus became editor of the People's World, a newspaper associated with the CPUSA. He was charged in 1952 with conspiracy to overthrow the U.S. government, and convicted and sentenced to five years, plus an additional three on contempt charges for refusing to name names. He only actually ever served 60 days, and his conviction was eventually overturned by the United States Supreme Court. Pettus left the CPUSA in 1958.

Pettus was fired from the "People's Daily World" publication in 1958, which was controlled by the Communist Party, because he broke with the Communist Party. The issue for the break had to do with expulsions of socialists at the publication's annual picnic.

Back in Seattle, Pettus moved onto a houseboat in 1958 and later played a crucial role in saving Lake Union's houseboats and in preventing the city from dumping sewage directly into the lake.

== Legacy ==
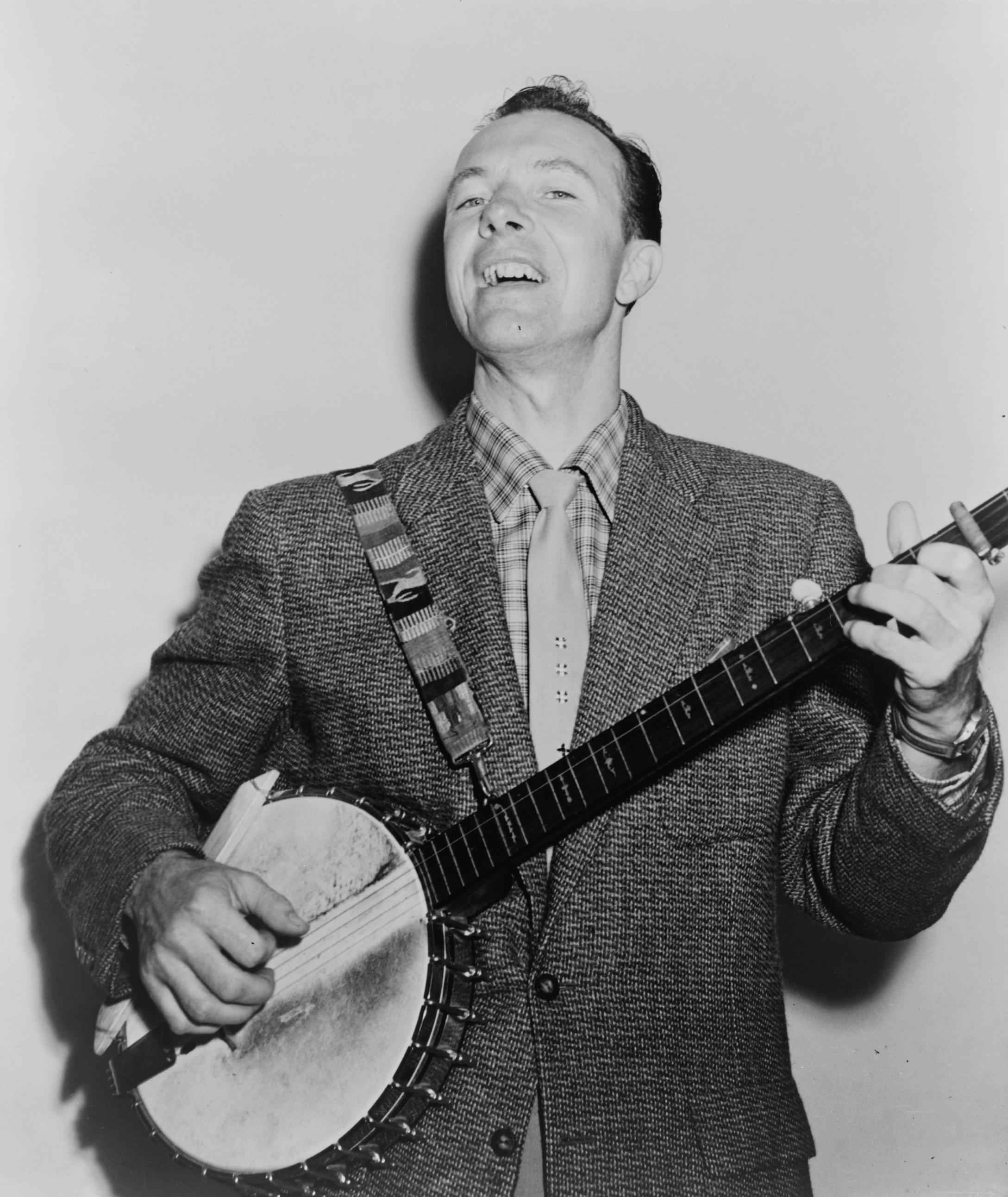
Pete Seeger (here, in 1955) may have learned the term "hootenanny" from Pettus when he and Woody Guthrie passed through Seattle in the late 1930s

In the late 1930s, in Seattle, Pettus edited the Commonwealth Federation's newspaper and hosted the Seattle-area hootenannies (or "hoots"), which Eric Scigliano describes as "fundraising, consciousness-raising, and hellraising parties" for the federation. Pettus had originally learned the word in Terre Haute, where it meant "a party that just sort of happens" without prior planning and brought it to Seattle. When Woody Guthrie and Pete Seeger passed through Seattle, they performed at the hoots; it is believed that they picked up the term hootenanny there, and passed it into the broader American vocabulary.

Terry Pettus Park

Seattle mayor Charles Royer honored him in 1982 with an official Terry Pettus Day, and in 1985, the year after his death, the city dedicated the small Terry Pettus Park on the shore of Lake Union near one of the houseboat neighborhoods.
