= Howard Costigan =

American political functionary (1904–1985)

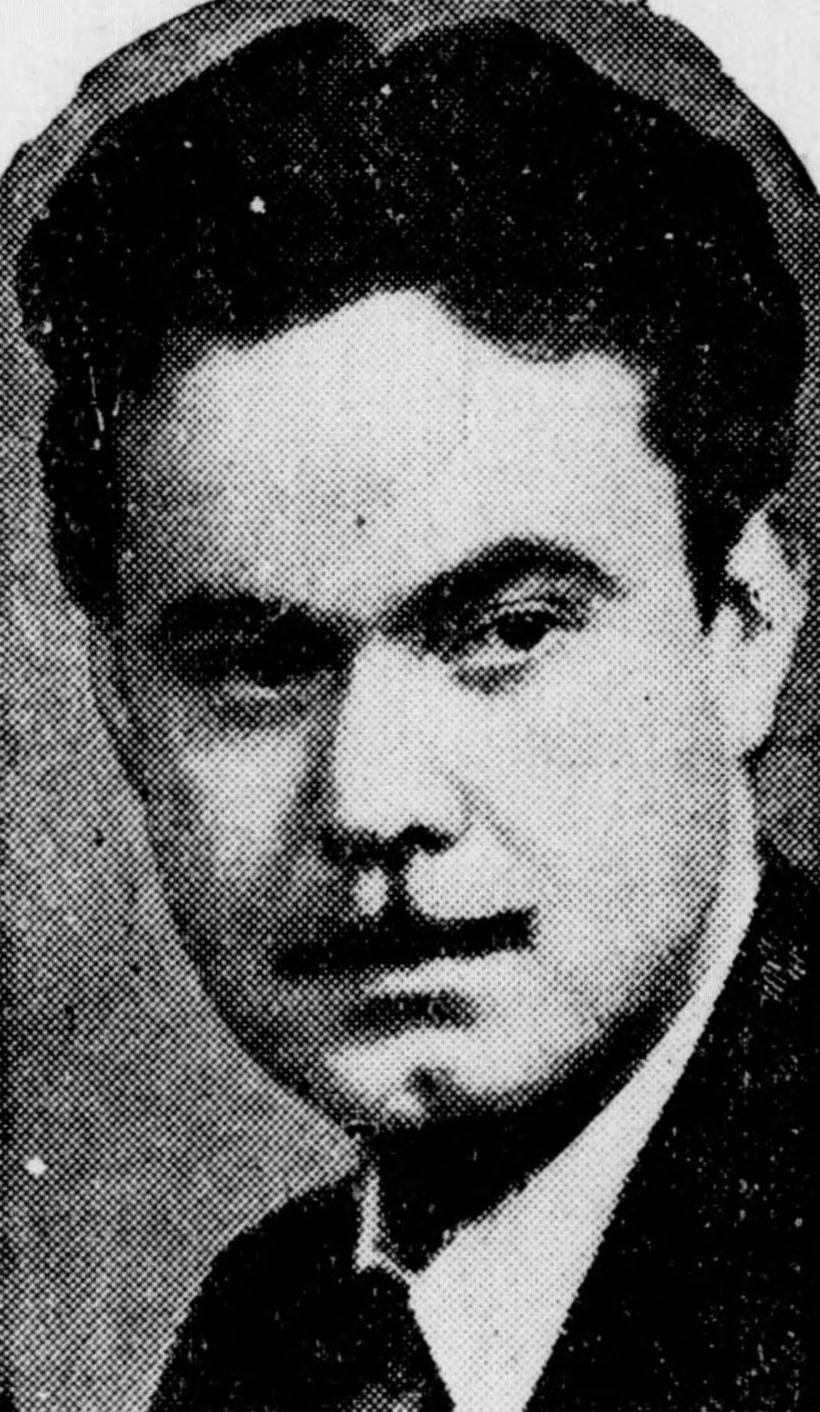
Costigan c. 1935

Howard Gary Costigan (January 27, 1904 – October 7, 1985) was an American radio commentator, political functionary, and politician. Costigan is best remembered as the Executive Secretary of the Washington Commonwealth Federation during the second half of the 1930s while he was simultaneously a secret member of the Communist Party USA (CPUSA); he later provided testimony in support of legislative committees investigating communist activities.

Costigan left the Communist Party in 1940, shortly after the conclusion of the Nazi-Soviet Pact. In 1948, Costigan provided testimony as a friendly witness to the Canwell Committee of the Washington State Legislature, charged with investigating Communist influence in the state. In May 1954, Costigan played a similar role on behalf of the House Committee on Un-American Activities during its investigation of radicalism in the Pacific Northwest.

== Biography ==
=== Early years ===
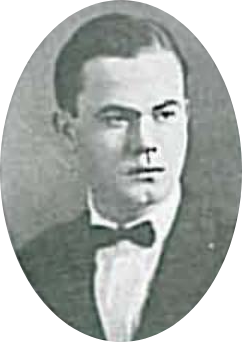
Costigan in the Whitman College yearbook, 1925

Howard Gary Costigan was born January 27, 1904, in Seattle, Washington. He attended primary school in Seattle and Everett before graduating from Centralia High School in Centralia, Washington. While at Centralia High School Costigan was a member of the school debate team for three years and was elected president of the student body.

On November 11, 1919, the 15-year-old Costigan was a witness to the so-called Centralia Massacre, an outburst of mob violence in which members of the American Legion participating in an Armistice Day parade attempted to storm the local headquarters of the radical Industrial Workers of the World and were met with armed resistance. The injustice of the event, which culminated in an IWW member being pulled from jail by an organized band and lynched, was instrumental in moving the young Costigan to himself become involved in radical politics.

Costigan worked in local lumber mills and retail shops even while in high school. Following graduation he attended Whitman College and Washington State Normal School at Bellingham, where he trained to be a teacher. While in college Costigan learned how to cut hair and became a member of the haircutter's union.

Upon graduation from college Costigan was employed as a teacher in Vancouver, Washington, where he also coached athletics.

=== Political career ===
In 1934 Costigan became actively involved in politics, helping to organize a state-level social democratic organization called the Commonwealth Builders, serving as Executive Secretary of the new group and editor of its official newspaper. According to Costigan's later sworn testimony to Congress

"The Commonwealth Builders was an organization originally of protesting and unemployed citizens who were displeased at the fact that they were expected to go up in front of soup kitchens when they preferred working with tools to build themselves and adequate standard of living...

"They decided that as long as private industry couldn't provide them with the chance to do it that it was the duty of the state, and they nominated candidates who supported what we call the Economic Security Act of 1935; and I might add that that act almost passed the House of Representatives. It got, I believe, 48 votes and there were 99 members in the House. And we elected on the Commonwealth Builders ticket 41 members of the House of Representatives in 1934, and I have forgotten the number in the State Senate..., about a third if my memory serves me right..."

The Commonwealth Builders provided the core for a new expanded organization established in 1935, the Washington Commonwealth Federation, of which Costigan was named the Executive Secretary. This group, which drew inspiration from the Cooperative Commonwealth Federation of Canada, continued to play a decisive role in Democratic Party politics in Washington state, working to elect political candidates and to push forward the New Deal program of President Franklin D. Roosevelt.

Costigan was a proficient public speaker on political and in 1935 this affinity soon gained him a place at Seattle radio station KIRO-AM (known as KPCB until 1937), where he worked as a political commentator and interviewer. Costigan would remain in this capacity for more than a decade, with his broadcasts frequently picked up for a national audience by the CBS and Mutual radio networks.

In December 1936, during the height of the international communist movement's attempt at fostering political cooperation with socialists and liberals under the banner of the Popular Front against Fascism, Costigan joined the Communist Party USA. According to his own testimony, Costigan signed his application for party membership with the pseudonym "Jack Robinson" and was accepted as a secret member of the organization, paid no dues, and did not attend meetings of local party units. Despite this unpublicized membership, Costigan indicates he was coopted into membership in the governing bureau of the Pacific Northwest district of the Communist Party in 1937 and remained in that capacity until 1939.

During this interval Costigan shaped the policy of the Washington Commonwealth Federation in accord with policy initiatives of the Communist Party.

Costigan left the CPUSA early in 1940, a few months after the conclusion of the conclusion of the Nazi-Soviet Pact. It was also at this time that he left the Washington Commonwealth Federation to work on the 1940 Roosevelt re-election campaign.

Costigan ran for political office himself for the first time in 1944, when he entered the Democratic primary election for U.S. Congress, attempting to win the seat vacated by Warren Magnuson, who decided to run instead for U.S. Senate. This effort proved unsuccessful, however, with the seat being won by Washington Commonwealth Federation stalwart and secret Communist Party member Hugh DeLacy.

In 1944 Costigan was appointed head of the Division of Progress and Industry Development of the Washington State Department of Conservation and Development, also working for the state's publicity division. He remained in this politically appointed position until resigning in 1946.

Costigan ran once more for political office in 1946, again running unsuccessfully against Hugh DeLacy in the Democratic primary. Following his defeat in that election by the more radical DeLacy — who ultimately lost his seat in the November general election — Costigan was hired to help establish a new organization called Pacific Northwest United. This was to be a mainstream political organization bringing together representatives of industry, agriculture, labor, and government and included the active participation of Seattle mayor William F. Devin and Portland mayor Earl Riley. Costigan would serve as Executive Secretary of this organization.

=== 1948 anti-communist testimony ===
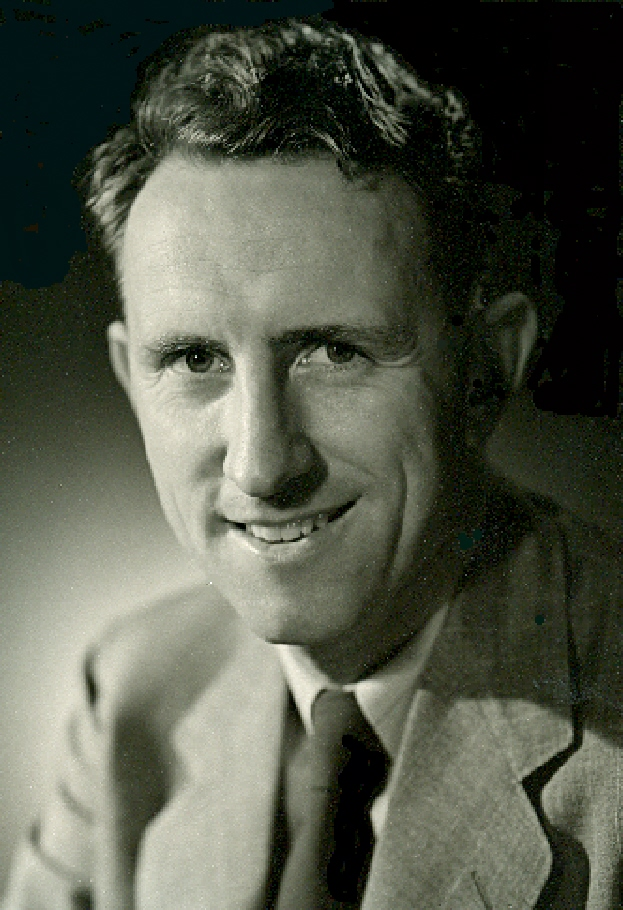
Former Washington Congressman Hugh DeLacy was among those named as a member of the Communist Party by Howard Costigan in his 1948 Canwell Committee testimony.

On February 2, 1948, Costigan gave testimony to the Canwell Committee of the Washington State Legislature, a state-level organization patterned on the national House Committee on Un-American Activities charged with the investigation of Communism in Washington state.

Costigan testified that the Washington Commonwealth Federation had been established in 1935 by liberal and labor groups over the opposition of the Communist Party as a means for advancing Roosevelt's New Deal agenda. It was only in 1936, according to Costigan's testimony, that the CPUSA warmed up to the idea of using its trade union and liberal connections for the "penetration" of the Washington Commonwealth Federation, including its executive board. Costigan told the committee that the Communists diligently supported the Roosevelt administration and the WCF as a bulwark against the spread of fascism and that Communists in the WCF were "the most ardent and perhaps the most conservative" supporters of these institutions.

Costigan testified that only in 1939, with the coming of the pact between the Soviet Union and Hitlerite Germany, did he note the primary emphasis of the Communist Party in supporting the interests of Soviet foreign policy. Costigan insisted that he had paid no party dues and carried no party card and "frankly had no feeling of being in the Party, except to consult with these people" throughout the 1937 to 1939 interval. After breaking with the CPUSA in 1940, Costigan noted that he had run against "the line that DeLacy and the rest of the Executive Committee of the Communist Party" were promoting until by the time of the 1946 elections Costigan found himself "probably hated more than anyone in the Pacific Northwest by the Communist Party."

During his Canwell Committee testimony Costigan named as members of the Communist Party former Congressman Hugh DeLacy, old age pension activists William J. Pennock and N.P. Atkinson, union leader Jess Fletcher, journalist Terry Pettus, longshoremen's union official Harry Bridges, and civil rights attorney John Caughlan.

Costigan separated from his wife in April 1948 and moved to Southern California, where he worked on behalf of the United Nations Appeal for Children. He subsequently served as the Executive Secretary of the Labor League of Hollywood Voters and as director of publicity for the Hollywood Film Council. He was also employed by the California Democratic Party's State Central Committee in 1948 and 1949.

From 1950 through 1954 Costigan served as the assistant to Roy Brewer, who occupied leading roles in the Hollywood Film Council and Council Against Communist Aggression in addition to heading the Theatrical Stage Employees and Moving Picture Machine Operators union.

=== 1954 anti-communist testimony ===
In 1954 the House Committee on Un-American Activities (HUAC) turned its attention to radicalism in the Pacific Northwest. Howard Costigan was called on May 28, 1954, as a friendly witness. In his testimony Costigan detailed his own biography and the formation of the Commonwealth Builders and Washington Commonwealth Federation for the committee and named as members of the Communist Party journalists Lowell Wakefield, Jim Cour, and Ellen McGrath, his former secretaries Sylvia Keen and Irene Borowski, University of Washington professors E. Harold Eby and Mel Jacobs, union officials Karley A. Larsen and Harry Jackson, party functionaries Lou Sass and Henry Huff, woodworkers' union official Mickey Orton, and attorney Jim Molthan, in addition to those already named in the 1948 Canwell proceedings.

Costigan also noted to HUAC that he had worked with the Federal Bureau of Investigation and other departments of the U.S. Government, including the Immigration department, since the conclusion of World War II.

Costigan argued to the committee that it was essential for conservatives to allow for "freedom for the expression of progressive and liberal ideas, in an effort to ameliorate conditions that give the Communists adequate soil in which to fortify." He also declared that progressives and liberals needed to learn that "under no circumstance" was the Communist Party a force for the advancement of humanitarian values, but rather existed as part of "the most reactionary force in the world."

=== Later years ===
After 1955 Costigan worked as an independent consultant and writer, counting among his clients the House Committee on Un-American Activities, for whom he helped investigate Communist influence in the motion picture industry.

Costigan moved to Fresno, California in 1970 and was active in the political campaigns of anti-communist Washington Senator Henry M. Jackson.

In the late 1970s Costigan began to research and write his memoirs, aided by his second wife, but the book was never finished.

=== Death and legacy ===
Howard Costigan died on October 7, 1985. He was 81 years old at the time of his death.

Costigan's papers are held in the Special Collections department of Suzzallo Library at the University of Washington in Seattle.
