= Melvin Rader =

American philosopher

- Born: Melvin Miller Rader; November 8, 1903; Walla Walla, Washington, U.S.
- Died: June 14, 1981 (aged 77); Seattle, Washington, U.S.

Academic background
- Education: University of Washington

Melvin Miller Rader (November 8, 1903 – June 14, 1981) was an American academic and civil rights advocate. He was a professor of philosophy at the University of Washington, teaching ethics, aesthetics and political philosophy. In the late 1940s, he was accused of being a Communist by the Canwell Committee, although he was later exonerated.

== Early life ==
Rader was born on November 8, 1903, in Walla Walla, Washington. His parents were Cary Melvin Rader, a lawyer, and Harriet Miller Rader, a teacher, and he had two siblings: Ralph and Martha. When he was a teenager, his father represented a man accused of being a Communist during the Red Scare; his father's conviction in taking the case strongly impacted Rader. He attended the University of Washington, where he received a bachelor's degree in 1925, a master's degree in 1927 and a PhD in English in 1929. His studies included the works of John Stuart Mill, Charles William Morris, Karl Marx and Peter Kropotkin. While at university, he was a member of the debate club although he developed glandular tuberculosis and was often ill. While completing his graduate degree, he taught English at the University of Idaho between 1927 and 1928. In 1931, his PhD dissertation, titled Presiding Ideas in Wordsworth's Poetry, was published as a book.

== Academic career ==
After graduation, Rader began teaching at Western Reserve University in Cleveland, Ohio, as an assistant professor of English. He was at the university between 1929 and 1930, when he returned to the University of Washington as an assistant professor of philosophy. He stayed at the university for the rest of his career; he was an associate professor between 1944 and 1948, a professor between 1948 and 1971 and professor emeritus between 1971 and his death in 1981. Rader was a visiting professor at the University of Chicago for the 1944–1945 academic year and at the University of South Florida in spring 1972, and was the Solomon Katz lecturer at the University of Washington in 1980. He received a Rockefeller Foundation research grant for the 1948–1949 academic year.

Early in his academic career, Rader focused on the use of aesthetics and philosophy in the poetry of William Wordsworth. In his dissertation, he explored Wordsworth's "unsensationistic theory of mind" in contrast to the debates about epistemology at the time. He argued that the self was not primarily associated with senses but instead with the mind, and that this philosophical choice would continue in transcendentalism throughout the nineteenth century in the United States. He published a second analysis of this work in Wordsworth: A Philosophical Approach in 1967.

Rader edited A Modern Book of Esthetics in 1935, an anthology which became commonly used as a textbook. It included more than thirty essays by philosophers such as David Hume, George Santayana, Friedrich Nietzsche, Sigmund Freud and John Dewey, divided into sections on the definition of art as semblance, beauty and wish fulfillment. Rader believed that art was a social practice, connected with his humanist approach. A civil libertarian, he wrote extensively about fascism, liberalism, socialism and communism, including in Ethics and Society: An Appraisal of Social Ideals (1950), and Ethics and the Human Community (1964), the latter of which considered the ethical impact of art. He also wrote No Compromise: The Conflict Between Two Worlds (1939), on the history of fascism based on a statement by Benito Mussolini that there cannot be a compromise between fascism and democracy.

He wrote the anthology The Enduring Questions in 1956, covering social and political philosophy through works by Plato, Thomas Hobbes, Mill and Marx. During this time, he also wrote a number of articles on technology and democracy. He was elected president of the Pacific Division of the American Philosophical Association, president of the American Society for Aesthetics in 1973 and a delegate to the American Council of Learned Societies in 1975. Later in his career, Rader published Art and Human Values (1976), co-written with Bertram Jessup, which considered the social purpose of art using gestalt theory. They connected art to values, politics, economics and history. In Marx's Interpretation of History (1979), he wrote about Marx's theory of history and said that he agreed with "the Marxists that a profound restructuring of our social order is necessary." He published The Right to Hope: Crisis and Community (1981), a collection of social philosophy essays, shortly before his death.

== Accusations of communism ==
In 1947, the Washington State Legislature, spurred by representative Albert F. Canwell, established the Committee on Un-American Activities, known colloquially as the Canwell Committee. The committee had the aim of investigating communists in the state and, following an allegation by state senator Thomas Bienz that over a hundred communists and sympathisers taught at the University of Washington, an investigation of the university began on July 19, 1948. A former communist, George Hewitt, alleged on July 22 that Rader had attended a communist summer school in New York in 1938. On the witness stand, Rader denied ever being a member of the communist party. When Rader and his family attempted to prove that they had instead been staying at Canyon Creek Lodge near Granite Falls, Washington, they discovered that the evidence had gone missing.

Hewitt was charged with perjury in King County but he had returned to New York and a local judge, Aaron J. Levy, refused to allow him to be extradited. Levy argued that he would face "eventual slaughter" in Washington. Although Rader was not fired from the university like some of his peers, Edwin O. Guthman, an investigative reporter for The Seattle Times, began to investigate the accusation to determine who was lying. He received a Pulitzer Prize in 1950 for his reporting of the events, which led to Rader's exoneration. Rader wrote a memoir of his experience with the committee titled False Witness, which was published in 1969.

Following the accusation, Rader renewed his focus on liberal democracy, serving as the president of the Washington chapter of the American Civil Liberties Union (ACLU) for three terms in 1957, 1961 and 1962. The state chapter awarded him the ACLU Bill of Rights Award in 1973 and he was actively involved with the organization's prisoner rights committee in Washington. He helped initiate, and served as a plaintiff in, a lawsuit which went before the United States Supreme Court in 1963 to abolish the loyalty oaths required of faculty at the University of Washington. The case, Baggett v. Bullitt, was successful and set a precedent for other universities across the country.

== Personal life ==
Rader married Katherine Ellis in autumn 1926 and the couple had one son, Gordon, prior to their divorce. He remarried in March 1935, to Virginia Baker, an artist and teacher, and the couple had four children: Miriam, Barbara, Cary and David. The couple were together until his death.

== Death and legacy ==
Following a long illness, Rader died on June 14, 1981, in Seattle. In 2009, an endowment fund was created in Rader's name at the University of Washington to fund philosophy students engaged in social justice work. He was depicted as a character in Mark Jenkins' play, All Powers Necessary and Convenient, about the Canwell committee which premiered at the Playhouse Theatre in 1998.

== Works ==
- Rader, Melvin (1931). Presiding Ideas in Wordsworth's Poetry. University of Washington Press. LCCN 31027893.
- Rader, Melvin, ed. (1935). A Modern Book Of Esthetics. Henry Holt and Company. LCCN 35013396.
- Rader, Melvin (1939). No Compromise: The Conflict Between Two Worlds. Macmillan. LCCN 39016617.
- Rader, Melvin (1950). Ethics and Society. Henry Holt and Company. LCCN 50008623.
- Rader, Melvin (1956). The Enduring Questions. Henry Holt and Company. LCCN 56-6075.
- Rader, Melvin (1964). Ethics and the Human Community. Holt, Rinehart and Winston. LCCN 64-15944.
- Rader, Melvin (1967). Wordsworth: A Philosophical Approach. Oxford University Press. LCCN 67081085.
- Rader, Melvin (1969). False Witness. University of Washington Press. LCCN 78-93027.
- Rader, Melvin; Jessup, Bertram (1976). Art and Human Values. Prentice-Hall, Inc. ISBN 0-13-046821-5.
- Rader, Melvin (1979). Marx's Interpretation of History. Oxford University Press. ISBN 0-19-502475-3.
- Rader, Melvin (1981). The Right to Hope. University of Washington Press. ISBN 0-295-95836-7.
