= Centralia High School (Centralia, Washington) =

Location
- 813 Eshom Road; Centralia, Washington 98531; Centralia, Lewis, Washington 98531; United States; 46°43′35″N 123°00′07″W

Information
- Type: Public
- Motto: Go Tigers!
- Founded: 1909
- School district: Centralia School District
- Principal: Scot Embrey
- Staff: 49.66 (FTE)
- Faculty: 172
- Grades: 9-12
- Age range: 14 - 19
- Enrollment: 973 (2024-2025)
  - Grade 9: 273
  - Grade 10: 241
  - Grade 11: 235
  - Grade 12: 224
- Student to teacher ratio: 20.00
- Campus type: Suburban
- Colors: Orange & Black
- Athletics: Basketball, Football, wrestling, tennis, soccer, golf, swimming, cheerleading, volleyball, cross country, baseball, track, fastpitch/softball
- Athletics conference: 2A Evergreen
- Mascot: Tigers
- Rival: W.F. West, Tumwater, Black Hills, Aberdeen, Shelton
- Website: chs.centraliaschooldistrict.org

Centralia High School is a public high school located in the unincorporated Ford's Prairie neighborhood of Centralia, Washington. Centralia High School (CHS) is a part of the Centralia School District and is the only high school in the district.

The school opened in 1909 as a regular 9th-12 public high school. In 2017, Centralia passed a $74 million bond to renovate and modernize the CHS. The original high school was torn down and the new facility was finished during the fall of 2020.

== History ==
Centralia High School (CHS) was built in 1909. The current Centralia High School building is the second to bear the name. The first senior class graduated in 1970. In 2017, voters in Centralia passed a $74 million million bond that allowed the complete remodel and modernization of Centralia High School in two phases—-Phase 1 and Phase 2. The first Phase was completed by the fall of 2019. Phase 2 was completed in March 2020 and included the instrumental and vocal rehearsal rooms, art department, wood shop and metal shop, commons, and performing arts center. The entire building was fully finished by the fall of 2020.

Though connected to Centralia public utilities, CHS is located in the unincorporated community of Ford's Prairie.

== Academics ==
A coffee shop and store, known as the "Tiger Hut", opened at the high school in the fall semester 2025. Students can participate as "employees" of the shop as part of a marketing class. The school partnered with a local company, Lewis County Coffee Company (LCCC), which provides supplies and products at cost; all profits go back into the endeavor or into a fund for the school's Future Business Leaders of America chapter. The company also helps to train students in operations of the shop, which is managed by teachers of the marketing course. The hut is similar to a coffee shop that opened in 2023 at W.F. West High School in Chehalis.

== Administration ==
As of the 2022-2022 school year, the current principal of Centralia High School is Scot Embrey. Mr. Ahern serves as the athletic director. Additional assistant principals are Heather Cheek and Kelly Sneed. Austin Baker is the CTE Director.

== Athletics ==
The mascot of Centralia High School is the Tiger. Centralia High School is a member of the WIAA (Washington Interscholastic Activities Association) in the 2A Evergreen Conference.

During the Fall season the school sanctions the following sports: Cheerleading, Football, Girls' Soccer, Cross Country, Boys' Tennis, Boys' Golf, Boys' and Girls' Swimming, (Note: The boys' swim team was formed in late 2025. The attempt took ten years, delayed due to budgeting issues and lack of space for the team.) Volleyball. Winter season includes: Cheerleading, Wrestling, Girls' Basketball and Boys' Basketball, Vocal and Instrumental Solo and Ensemble contest. The Spring season includes: Baseball, Boys' Soccer, Fastpitch, Girls' Golf, Girls' Tennis and Track.

State Championships
Season	Sport	Number of Championships	Year
Fall	Cross Country, Girls	1	1979, 1983
Fall	Football	4	1980, 2001, 2007, 2008
Fall	Golf, Boys	3	1985, 2006, 2013
Fall	Soccer, Girls	4	1997-2000
Winter	Basketball, Boys	5	1979, 1981, 2000, 2005, 2014
Winter	Basketball, Girls	2	2000, 2018
Winter	Cheerleading, Girls	3	2003, 2010, 2011
Winter	Volleyball	3	2015, 2017, 2019
Spring	Baseball	3	1982, (Note: With the 1982 baseball title, combined with the 1980 football and 1979 basketball championships, the high school achieved a "Triple Crown" of the three major sports at the time. It is thought that Centralia High School was the first to accomplish this feat in the state.) 1993, 2015
Spring	Golf, Girls	1	2015
Spring	Fastpitch Softball, Girls	3	1980, 1986, 1991
Spring	Slowpitch Softball, Girls	1	1984
Spring	Swimming, Girls	2	1983, 2007
Spring	Track and Field, Boys	4	1938, 2006-2008
Spring	Track and Field, Girls	1	1976 (Note: Reported to be the first state championship team title for the high school, the girls team had only formed five years prior. Featuring just six competitors, the crew beat North Thurston High School by 3.5 points for the Class AA title. Student Kathy Dropalski, who won two titles during the meet, became the first individual state champion in the school's history.)
Spring	Track and Field, Mixed	1	2017
Total		43	

=== Swamp Cup ===
Centralia maintains a rivalry with W.F. West High School from neighboring Chehalis known as the "Swamp Cup" or the "Battle of the Swamp." (Note: The moniker, "Battle of the Swamp", was officially given under the local newspaper, The Chronicle in 2007.) The first football matchup between the schools took place on Thanksgiving Day, 1907; Centralia won the game, 11-0. The rivalry was continued on the holiday every year until 1963, when it began to move to other weeks. The rivalry football event was paused beginning before the 2026 season due to scheduling issues and "recent league adjustments". During the history of the competition, which encompassed 155 games, the Tigers lead with 77 wins to 72 victories for Chehalis; there were 6 ties.

In the present day, matchups in all sports between the Tigers and Bearcats are known as the Swamp Cup, but the winner of the annual football matchup takes home the Swampman trophy, also known as "Swampy."

== Notable alumni ==
- Charlie Albright (born 1988), pianist and composer
- Calvin Armstrong (born 1982), NFL and CFL player
- Bob Coluccio (born 1951), MLB player
- Howard Costigan (1904-1985), political activist
- Merce Cunningham (born 1919), dancer and choreographer
- Sandy Marth Hill (born 1946), television journalist
- Dexter Kerstetter (born 1907), soldier and Medal of Honor recipient
- Soren Johnson (born 1976), video game programmer
- Angela Meade (born 1977), opera singer
- C.D. (Clyde) Moore (born 1958), 2-star general USAF
- Marcus O'Day (born 1897), physicist
- Lyle Overbay (born 1977), MLB player
- Ford Rainey (born 1908), actor
- Cindy Ryu, first female Korean-American mayor in the United States
- Detlef Schrempf (born 1963), NBA player
