= Ellsworth C. Wills =

American politician (1911–1973)

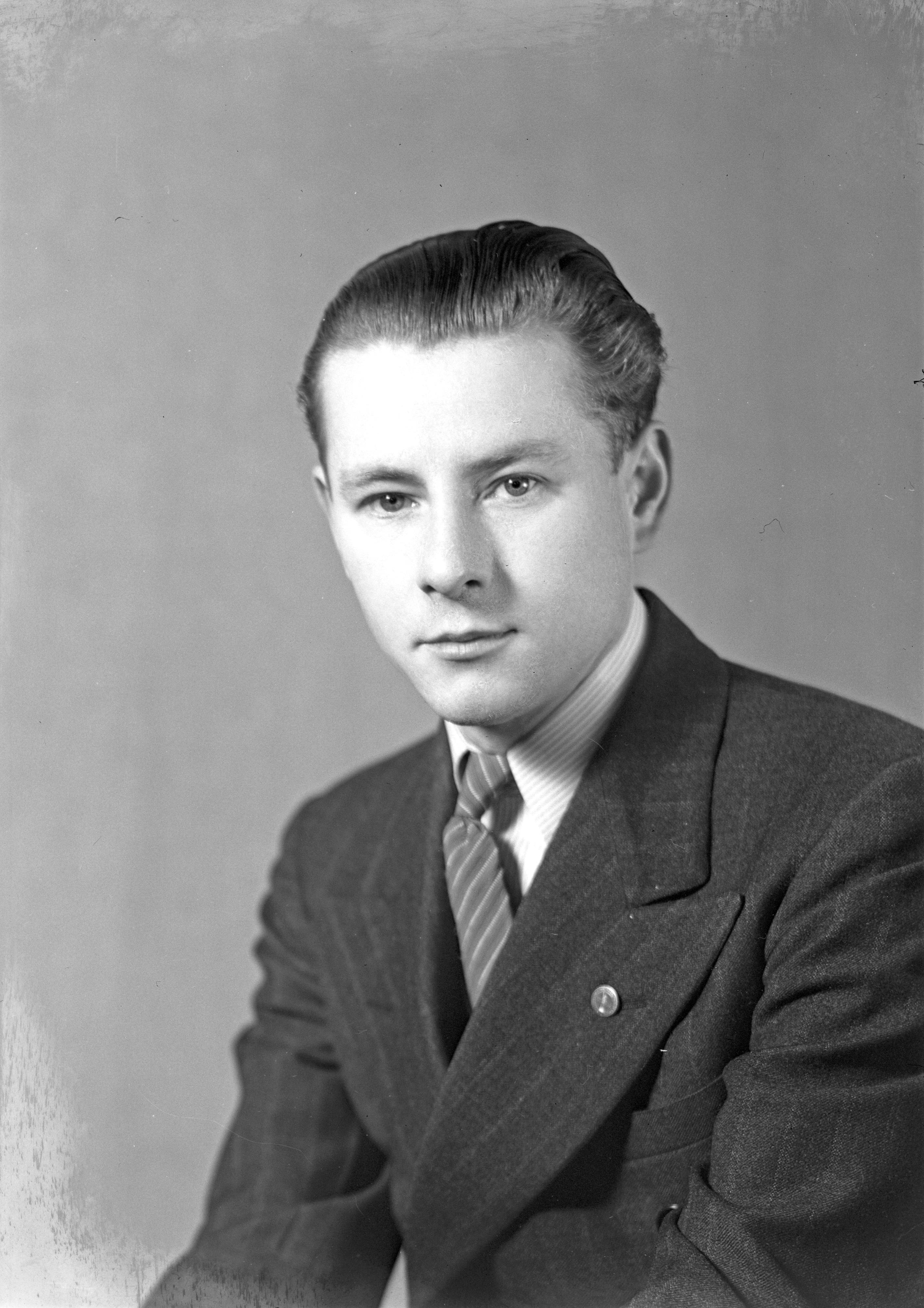
- Wills c. 1939

Member of the Washington House of Representatives from the 34th district
- In office January 9, 1939 – January 13, 1941
- Preceded by: Multi-member district
- Succeeded by: Multi-member district

Personal details
- Born: July 4, 1911 Oregon, U.S.
- Died: June 13, 1973 (aged 61) Seattle, Washington, U.S.
- Resting place: Willamette National Cemetery
- Party: Democratic
- Other political affiliations: Communist (secretly)

Military service
- Allegiance: United States
- Branch/service: United States Navy Reserve
- Years of service: c. 1941–1945 c. 1950–1953
- Rank: Petty Officer Third Class
- Battles/wars: World War II; Korean War

Ellsworth Clayton Wills (July 4, 1911 – June 13, 1973) was an American activist and politician who served as a member of the Washington House of Representatives from 1939 to 1941.

Wills was elected as a Democrat with the support of the Washington Commonwealth Federation, but was secretly a member of the Communist Party, a fact which he admitted to during the Canwell Committee hearings in 1948. In turn, he named several other prominent state Democrats as secret Communists.

In his 1951 appraisal of the hearings, Yale Law professor Vern Countryman characterized the testimony of former party members like Wills as "questionable," highlighting that they often passed off personal opinions as "official knowledge." In her memoirs, Communist activist Hazel Wolf denounced those who testified as "stoolpigeons" and cast doubt on their "indelible... memory concerning microscopic events long gone."
