= Washington Commonwealth Federation =

Washington state Political organization

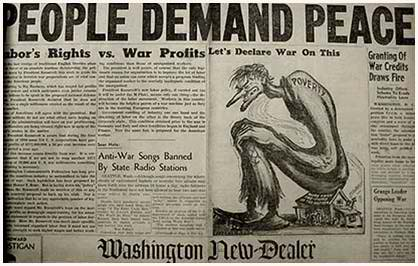
The front page of the Washington New Dealer, the WCF's official newspaper, after the signing of the Molotov-Ribbentrop pact

The Washington Commonwealth Federation (WCF) was a political pressure group established in the American state of Washington in 1934 as "Commonwealth Builders, Incorporated" (CBI). The organization changed its name to Washington Commonwealth Federation in 1935. The organization did not run political candidates in its own name but rather functioned as an organized faction in the Washington State Democratic Party.

Originating out of an interest to expand the End Poverty in California movement to Washington state as a means of alleviating the misery of the Great Depression, the WCF came to be dominated by the Communist Party USA beginning in the popular front years of the late 1930s. Charged by critics to be a Communist front, the WCF was dissolved in 1945, during the era of the Second Red Scare.

== Founding ==
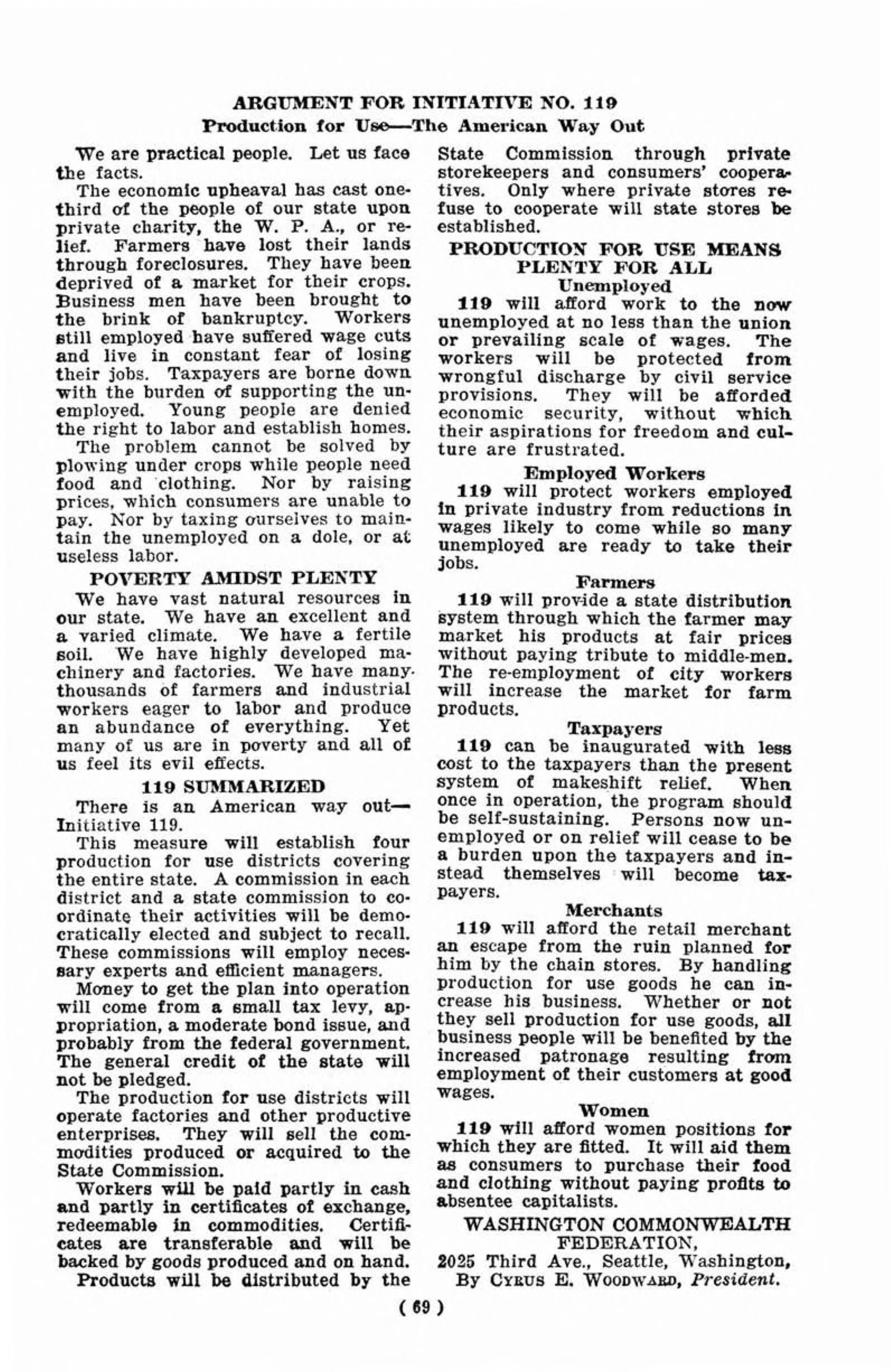
The argument in favor of a production for use ballot initiative put forward by the WCF, 1936

The Washington Commonwealth Federation was launched in August 1934 as "Commonwealth Builders, Inc." (CBI) by a group of middle-class socialists who sought effective political action to achieve a "Cooperative Commonwealth" that included government ownership of banking and large-scale industry, state aid to farmers and small businesses, and the establishment of a network of producer and consumer cooperatives. These individuals were greatly influenced by the efforts of Upton Sinclair in his maverick End Poverty in California (EPIC) movement of 1934, marked by Sinclair's run for Governor of California behind the slogan of "production for use."

In the estimation of one student of the movement:

"The CBI believed EPIC offered an excellent model for social and economic reform and struggled to find political candidates to promote its expansion into Washington State. Under this plan, a state industrial commission would be created to launch state-owned farms and industries to employ those who could not secure employment in the private sector. Employees would produce goods to be sold in state-owned stores and the employees would in turn purchase these same goods. A separate form of currency would be used to pay employees and to purchase goods within the system to ensure the rate of return. Essentially, the people involved would produce goods for use and not for profit."

While the CBI in Washington did not achieve the same sort of explosive growth exhibited by the EPIC movement in California, the group still won the support of some key farm and labor organizations in the state. The group moved to further expand its range of influence in October 1935, when a convention was held that brought together members of the Townsend Clubs, Washington State Grange, the Liberty Party, the Bellamy Clubs, Continental Committee Technocrats, Democratic Party Clubs, and sundry unaffiliated individuals as the Washington Commonwealth Federation.

== Communist control ==
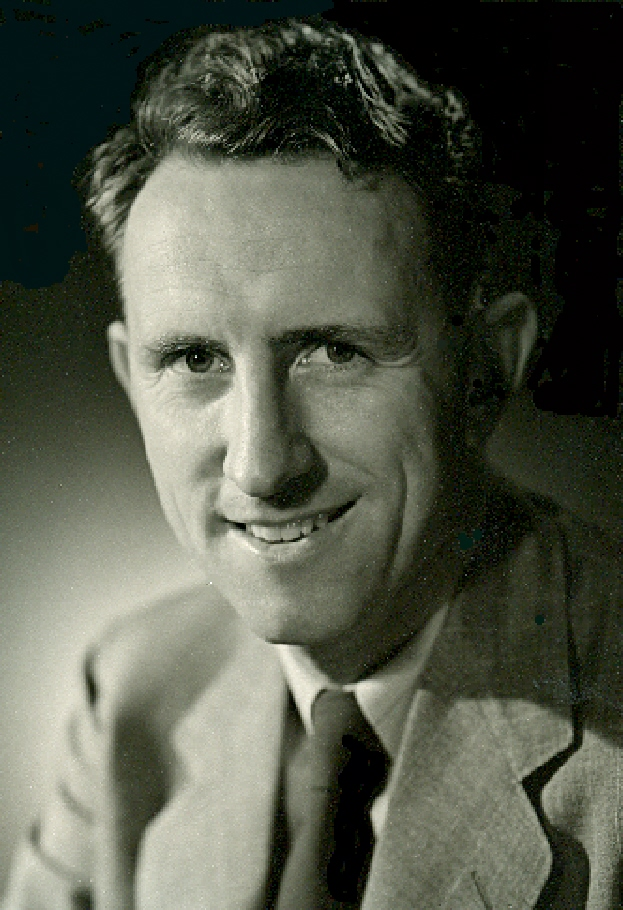
Hugh DeLacy, President of the WCF in the late 1930s, was elected to Congress in 1944.

In the aftermath of the rise of Nazism in Germany in 1933, the Communist International began to steer the national political parties obedient to it away from the ultra-radical rhetoric of the so-called "Third Period" and towards a more moderate building of alliances with non-Communist individuals and groups, policies known as Popular Front tactics. In the United States this change in the Comintern line saw members of the Communist Party attempt to join and seek to exert influence within established political organizations, such as the Washington Commonwealth Federation. Although they were initially banned from membership by the CBI, some Communist Party members were elected by labor groups as delegates to the April 1936 convention of the WCF. Following that gathering, Communist participation was formally allowed by the convention's refusal to reinstitute the previous exclusionary rule.

A short period of organizational growth and seemingly bright prospects followed communist entry into the organization. The positive outlook soon dissipated, however, as by 1938 factional disputes and red-baiting severely weakened the WCF with many non-Communist members ending their participation. The Communist Party came to exert decisive influence in the organization, which began to closely follow the CPUSA's national political line, with its Executive Secretary, Howard Costigan, secretly a member of the Communist Party from 1936.

Costigan later estimated that by 1937, 56 of the 72 members of the WCF's governing Executive Board were members of the Communist Party. Another reliable insider indicated that 90 percent of those employed by the WCF's newspaper were CPUSA members, including both of the publication's editors.

It was a time of substantial influence, with more than a dozen "concealed communists" elected to the statehouse in Olympia between 1936 and 1939, including 11 members of the Washington House of Representatives and 3 State Senators. WCF-backed politicians constituted fully one third of the seats in the 1937 Washington House, a voting bloc that enabled the passage of a bevy of bills addressing longtime progressive concerns, including repeal of the state's California Criminal Syndicalism Act, passage of a pure food and drug act, establishment of a minimum wage for state employees, establishment of a graduated income tax, and other measures.

The Communist Party showed a pattern of impressive growth in Washington state during these last years of the 1930s. From a membership of 1,137 in 1936, total CPUSA membership in the state grew to 5,016 by the end of 1938 and continued to increase in the first months of 1939.

However, with pervasive CP control of the WCF's organizational apparatus came a desire to use the group's public clout to advance the party line of CPUSA and the Comintern. Following the Nazi-Soviet Pact of August 1939, the WCF began to denounce Roosevelt as a warmonger, further isolating the organization from its base of support within the state Democratic Party. Membership in the organization plummeted.

Following the December 1941 Japanese attack on Pearl Harbor, which pushed America into World War II as an ally of the Soviet Union, the political ground upon which the WCF stood shifted again. The organization made a dramatic comeback, however, electing a number of its members to the Washington State Legislature and electing leading WCF activist Hugh DeLacy to the U.S. Congress.

== Last days ==
To some extent, the Washington Commonwealth Federation was effectively killed by its wartime success. By the end of World War II, the WCF stood as the single most important political influence in the politics of the Democratic Party of Washington. From the perspective of the group's leadership, its mission had been fulfilled, and in 1945 the federation was dissolved as an unnecessary component of state Democratic politics.

The WCF also faced determined opposition from an unlikely alliance. The 1938 elections were marked by centrist "Regular" Democrats attacking WCF-backed candidates in the primaries, followed by conservative Republican opponents of the New Deal in the fall, both of which groups derided the WCF as a "Trojan Horse for the Communist Party." In the conservative political climate of the late 1950s, many of the programs backed by the WCF would be ultimately reversed. The anti-WCF offensive would achieve full flower in the 1948 Canwell Joint Legislative Fact-Finding Committee on Un-American Activities of the Washington Legislature, which would dedicate itself to the exposure of the WCF as a surreptitious Communist front.

== Legacy ==
In the view of historian Harvey Klehr, the Washington Commonwealth Federation marked perhaps the most effective alliance between Communists and non-Communists of anywhere in the US in the Depression.

== Publications ==
Throughout its existence, the WCF published a regular newspaper, beginning in August 1934 as The Washington Commonwealth Builder in 1934. The name of the paper was shorted in October 1935 to The Washington Commonwealth.

In August 1936, the name of the paper was changed again, now to Commonwealth News, which was changed again just three months later, with the paper re-emerging as The Sunday News. In September 1938 the organization marked its growing affection for the social program of Roosevelt, changing its name again to the Washington New Dealer. That name was retained until the middle of World War II.

In January 1943, the WCF changed the name of its official organ to its sixth and final incarnation, The New World. That name was retained by the newspaper until its termination, in November 1948.

== Leadership ==
=== Presidents ===
1935: Cyrus K. Woodward
1936: Thomas E. Smith
1937: Hugh De Lacy

=== Vice Presidents ===
1935: B. G. Bomar
1936: John Fox
1937: Earl Gunther

=== Executive Secretaries ===
1935: Jean Stovell
1936: Howard Costigan
1941: Terry Pettus

=== Convention Chairs ===
1935: Cyrus K. Woodward

== Notable members and endorsees ==
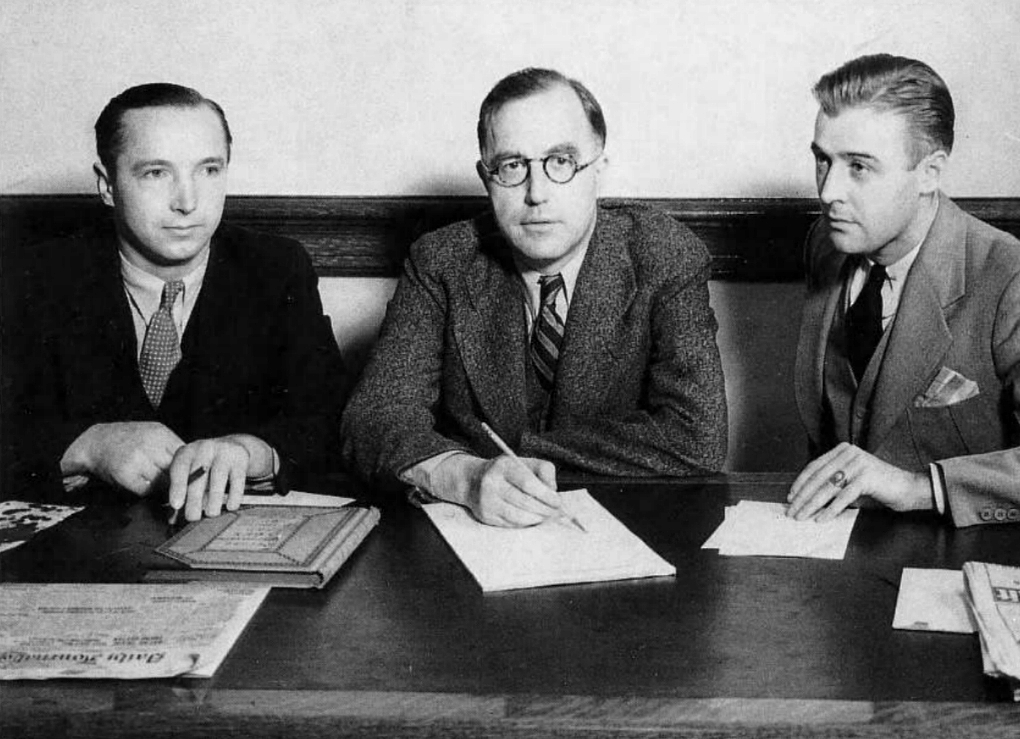
Washington State Democratic Party standard-bearers, 1934. (L-R): Marion Zioncheck, Lewis Schwellenbach, Warren Magnuson.

- H. C. Armstrong, Washington State Representative (1937–1949)
- Stanley Atwood, Washington State Superintendent of Public Instruction (1937–1940)
- Homer Bone, United States Senator (1933–1944)
- John M. Coffee, U.S. Representative (1937–1947)
- Howard Costigan, Executive Secretary of the WCF
- Hugh De Lacy, President of the WCF, U.S. Representative (1945–1947)
- Clarence Dill, candidate for U.S. House of Representatives (1942)
- John F. Dore, Mayor of Seattle (1932–1934, 1936–1938)
- Mary Farquharson, Washington State Senator (1935–1943)
- Kathryn Fogg, Washington State Representative (1939–1941)
- Earl George, labor leader
- Knute Hill, U.S. Representative (1933–1943)
- Henry M. Jackson, U.S. Representative (1941–1953)
- Warren Magnuson, U.S. Representative (1937–1944)
- Victor Aloysius Meyers, Lieutenant Governor of Washington (1933–1953)
- William J. Pennock, Washington State Representative (1939–1947)
- Terry Pettus, editor of the Washington New Dealer
- Thomas C. Rabbitt, Washington State Senator (1943–1947)
- Albert Rosellini, Washington State Senator (1939–1957)
- Lewis B. Schwellenbach, United States Senator (1935–1940)
- Martin F. Smith, U.S. Representative (1933–1943)
- Thomas E. Smith, President of the WCF, King County Commissioner
- John C. Stevenson, candidate for Governor of Washington (1936)
- Monrad Wallgren, U.S. Representative (1933–1940)
- Ellsworth C. Wills, Washington State Representative (1939–1941)
- George F. Yantis, Speaker of the Washington House of Representatives (1933–1935, 1945–1947)
- Marion Zioncheck, U.S. Representative (1933–1936)

== See also ==
- Socialist Party of Washington
- End Poverty in California
