= Centralia School District (Washington) =

School district in Centralia, WA

Address
- 2320 Borst Avenue Centralia, Washington, 98531; United States

District information
- Grades: K through 12th
- Established: 1888; 138 years ago
- Superintendent: Lisa Grant
- Schools: 9
- Budget: $2.4 million
- NCES District ID: 5301140

Students and staff
- Students: 3,613
- Teachers: 198
- Student–teacher ratio: 18.52

Other information
- Website: www.centraliaschooldistrict.org

Centralia School District 401 is a public school district based in Centralia, Washington.

== Schools ==
The school district serves the entirety of Centralia, Washington. There are five elementary schools, one middle school, two high schools and one early learning center for pre-kindergartners. As of 2021, the nine schools in the district are:

- Early Learning Center (pre-kindergarten)
- Ford's Prairie Elementary School (k-6th)
- Washington Elementary School (k-6th)
- Edison Elementary School (k-6th)
- Jefferson Lincoln Elementary (k-6th)
- Oakview Elementary (K-6th)
- Centralia Middle School (7th-8th)
- Centralia High School (9th-12th)
- Futurus High School (9th-12th)

== Academics ==
In 2024, Lewis County Transit partnered with the district on a pilot plan, known as the Renewable Energy Vehicle and Infrastructure Technician (REVIT) training program, to encourage local students to enter in the educational and professional fields associated with green energy. With grants from the Washington State Department of Ecology, the program is planned to expand into other school districts in the county and eventually throughout the state.

== History ==
The Centralia Middle School, under actions taken by student efforts, successfully voted at the end of 2024 to change the school mascot from the Yellow Jackets to the Tigers, matching the high school. The change, meant to unify the schools and connected programs in the district under one mascot, also includes altering the middle school's colors from blue-and-gold to orange-and-black. The Yellow Jackets history is to be preserved in a memorabilia showcase near the library.
