= Earl George =

American activist

- Born: 1894; Denver, Colorado
- Died: 1985 (aged 90–91); Seattle, Washington
- Organization: International Longshore and Warehouse Union
- Political party: Communist Party USA
- Movement: Labor movement, Civil Rights movement
- Spouse: Vivian George

Earl George was a leader in the Communist Party and International Longshore and Warehouse Union, photographer, and civil rights activist from Seattle.

== Biography ==
Earl George was born in Denver, Colorado, in 1894. George stated that being Black in the US radicalized him at an early age. He was also influenced by the violent Colorado miners' strikes. In 1917, George was drafted into the US Army for World War I and sent to Fort Lewis in Washington. He remained in Seattle and participated in the Seattle General Strike in 1919. When recalling the strike, George famously said "nothing moved but the tide".

Racist hiring practices and racism in unions made many jobs unavailable for African Americans like George. In the 1920s and 1930s, George worked low-paying non-union jobs in the service sector and then became a maritime steward. During this time, he joined the Industrial Workers of the World, a revolutionary international labor union. He later joined The Communist Party of Washington State. During the Great Depression, George was involved in the Unemployed Citizens' League, Workers' Alliance, Washington Commonwealth Federation, and Washington Pension Union.

In 1938, George took a job working in a warehouse and joined the International Longshore and Warehouse Union (ILWU) Local 9. He worked actively in the labor movement to promote racial equality. Although the ILWU preached nondiscrimination, Black workers and workers of color were often excluded from leadership positions. George worked with the communist faction within the ILWU to address these inequalities. He was elected president of Local 9 in 1949, making him the first Black president of an ILWU local. While serving as president, George worked with ILWU regional director Bill Chester to establish the National Negro Labor Council and campaigned to push unions to organize Black workers.

In 1944, George was an unsuccessful candidate for the 37th district of the Washington House of Representatives.

Like many other activists at the time, George faced vicious red-baiting. In the early 1950s, George was subpoenaed to appear before the House Un-American Activities Committee, where he invoked the fifth amendment and declined to answer most questions.

George was active in the civil rights movement in Seattle in the 1960s. In 1966, he helped organized the Seattle School Boycott to protest segregation. During this time, he became a well-known photographer and was hired by the ILWU to take photographs for their union organ, The Dispatcher. His images also appeared in the Marxist newspaper People's World.

George retired in 1961 and became active with the Pacific Coast Pensioners Association, holding various leadership positions in the Seattle chapter. He retired in 1961, and died in 1985.
