= Playhouse Theatre (Seattle) =

Theatre in Seattle, Washington, United States

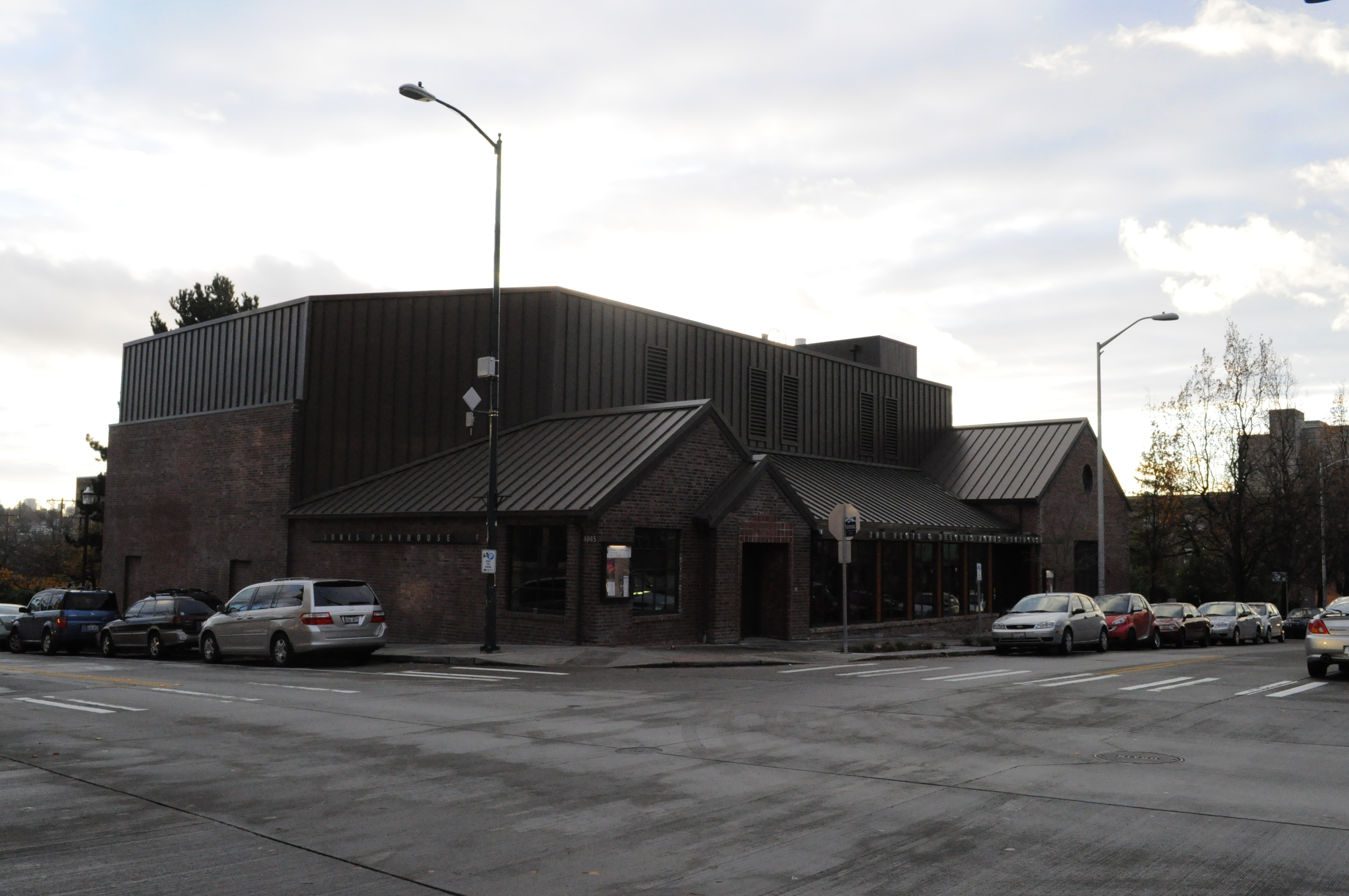
- Interactive map of Playhouse Theatre
- Location: Seattle
- Coordinates: 47°39′24″N 122°18′50″W

Website
- Edit this at Wikidata

The Playhouse Theatre (later University of Washington Playhouse Theatre, now officially Floyd and Delores Jones Playhouse) is a theater located at 4045 University Way NE (41st St) on The Ave in the University District, Seattle, Washington. It was converted from a tile warehouse in 1930 by Burton and Florence James, who set up the Seattle Repertory Playhouse with multi-ethnic performers and audiences.

They received funding during the Federal Theatre Project (FTP) of the New Deal to set up the Negro Repertory Company, one of four FTP units in Seattle, which was based at their theatre. The facility was sold to the University of Washington in 1950, which used it for its theatre department. In 1967 it was converted from a proscenium to a thrust stage. From 2007 to 2009, the building was reconstructed to add a story and make numerous improvements.

== History ==
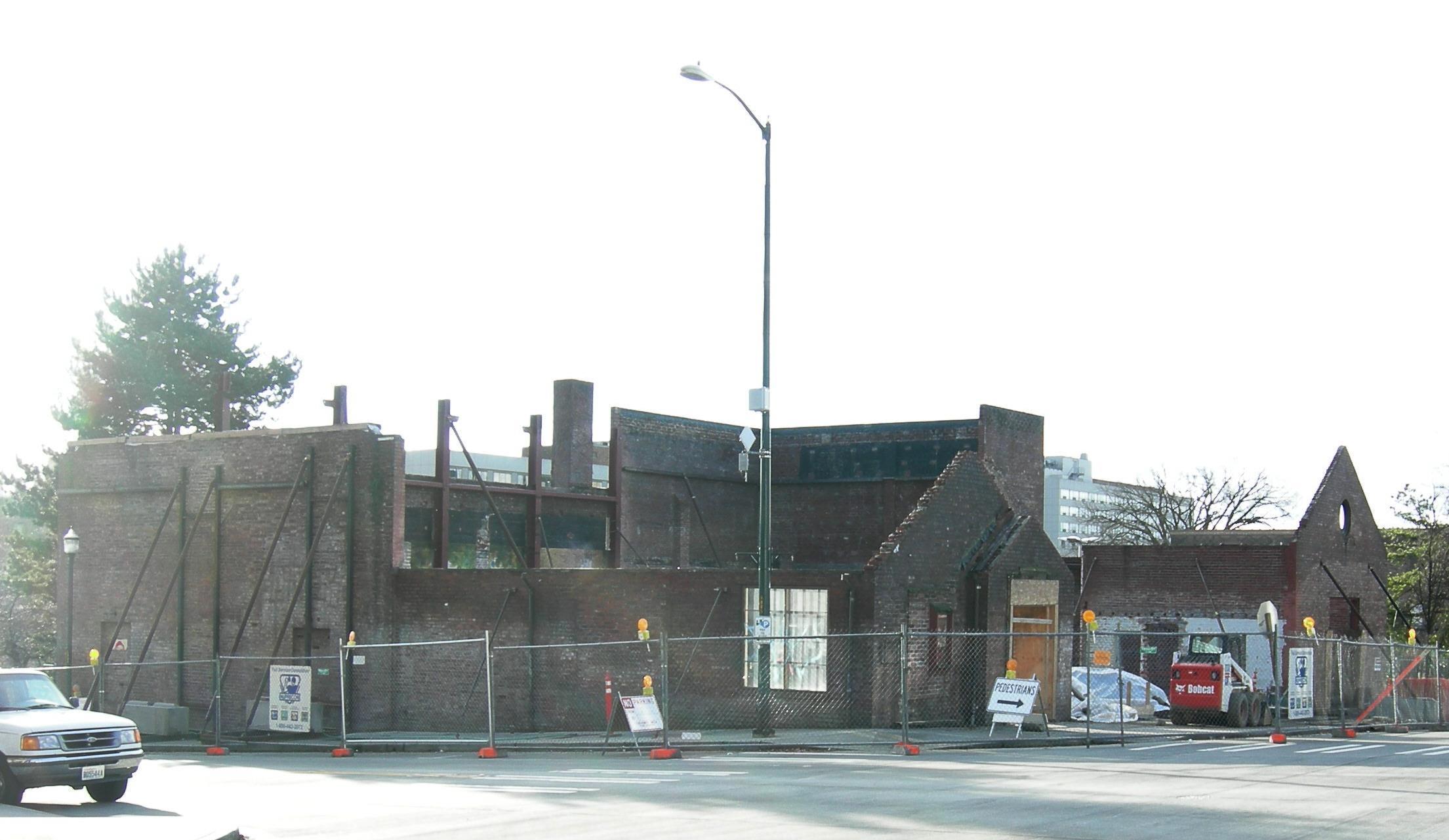
University of Washington Playhouse Theatre undergoing reconstruction in late 2007

=== The Jameses ===
New Yorkers Burton James (1888–1951) and Florence James (1892–1988) came to Seattle in 1923 to start the theater department of what was then the Cornish School and is now the Cornish College of the Arts. In 1928, the Jameses quit Cornish after the school's board of directors objected to a production of Pirandello's Six Characters in Search of an Author because of its brothel scene.

They formed the Seattle Repertory Playhouse (no relation to today's Seattle Repertory Theatre). The venturesome, multi-ethnic, multiracial, and sometimes explicitly socialist company performed a wide repertoire, ranging "from popular comedies to works by Ibsen and Goethe". In 1930, they established themselves in the Playhouse Theatre, which they constructed in a former tile warehouse at the corner of NE 41st Street and University Way NE ("The Ave") in the University District. The Jameses also taught some classes at the University of Washington.

In 1933 the theater scored a major success with In Abraham's Bosom. Featuring a largely black cast and a gospel choir, it was co-produced with Seattle's First African Methodist Episcopal Church. When the Federal Theatre Project began in 1935 during the New Deal era, the University of Washington's director Glenn Hughes applied to the program for funding for a unit.

The Jameses applied separately to start a unit with Negro actors, to be housed at their theater with them as producers and directors. The proposal was funded, as were those of Hughes and two other FTP units in Seattle. The resulting Negro Repertory Company was founded in January 1936, in cooperation with the Seattle Urban League. Federal Theatre Project national director Hallie Flanagan considered the company the best "Negro unit" in the program, and historian Rena Fraden says that they put on "some of the most experimental of productions of any Negro unit." Historian Quintard Taylor estimates that as many as 200 African Americans—about 5 percent of Seattle's black population in 1940—were involved with at least one of the productions over the next several years.

The company put on plays such as Paul Peters and George Sklar's Stevedore—already a success in New York—in which a Black waterfront union organizer is unjustly framed for the rape of a white woman, and his union fights back. There is evidence to suggest the Black troupe of the Seattle Negro Unit changed the ending so that the Black stevedores fought off the white lynch mob alone, without the help of fellow white unionists. The state administrator of the Works Progress Administration (WPA), which oversaw the FTP, shut down a 1937 production of Lysistrata after one night, although he had not personally seen it, because his wife and secretary complained about its risque nature. The Negro Repertory Company was performing it at the larger Moore Theatre. The players rejected producing George Gershwin's Porgy and Bess after some rehearsals, because they found the material degrading and offensive. One of the important playwrights to emerge out of the unit was Theodore Browne. He adapted Lysistrata for the troupe and wrote the John Henry drama The Natural Man. Joe Staton was also an important driving force in the Seattle Negro Unit, adapting the work of Paul Laurence Dunbar for a popular show called An Evening with Dunbar. The Jameses resigned in 1937 after a public furor over their production of Power, about public utilities, but continued to operate their theater. The NRC was combined with another FTP unit and survived for as long as funding did.

In 1939, the U.S. Congress terminated the Federal Theatre Project after years of increasing criticism about some of its productions and concerns about socialist or communist associations of its directors and productions. Seattle's pioneering impresario of jazz in a concert setting, Norm Bobrow, promoted weekly Sunday concerts at the Playhouse Theatre for two years starting in May 1946. After World War II, as the Cold War era began, the Jameses stuck to their socialist views, continuing to stage pro-labor plays and opening their hall to the Group Health Cooperative and Washington State Pension Union.

In 1948, the Jameses had to testify before the Washington State Legislature's Canwell Committee, which was investigating communist activity at the University of Washington in the postwar era of heightened anxiety. The Jameses lost subscribers, and by 1950, their theater was in financial trouble. They sold it to the university. Burton James's health failed about the same time; Florence James continued her theater work in Saskatchewan, Canada.

=== The University era ===
The university renamed the building the University of Washington Playhouse Theatre and made regular use of it for their growing drama department. In 1967, Greg Falls (later the founder of Seattle's ACT Theatre), influenced by the ideas of such avant garde directors as Peter Brook, converted the building from a proscenium to a thrust stage.

From 2007 to 2009, the university carried out a major reconstruction of the building, working with LMN Architects of Seattle: it raised the roof an extra story, improved sight lines and lighting capabilities, and brought the building up to present-day seismic standards. The building was renamed the Floyd and Delores Jones Playhouse, in honor of a foundation that donated US$2.4 million to the project. Floyd Jones, who is still alive, sees the name as a tribute to his late wife, who was "devoted to the arts, social justice, and Democratic politics… always thrilled when they took on plays… like All Powers Necessary and Convenient", which was about the Canwell hearings of the 1940s.

== See also ==
- Albert M. Ottenheimer
