= Terry Pettus Park =

Park in Seattle, Washington

- Terry Pettus Park as seen from Lake Union
- Coordinates: 47.6367°N 122.3293°W
- Area: 0.9 acres (3,600 m^{2})

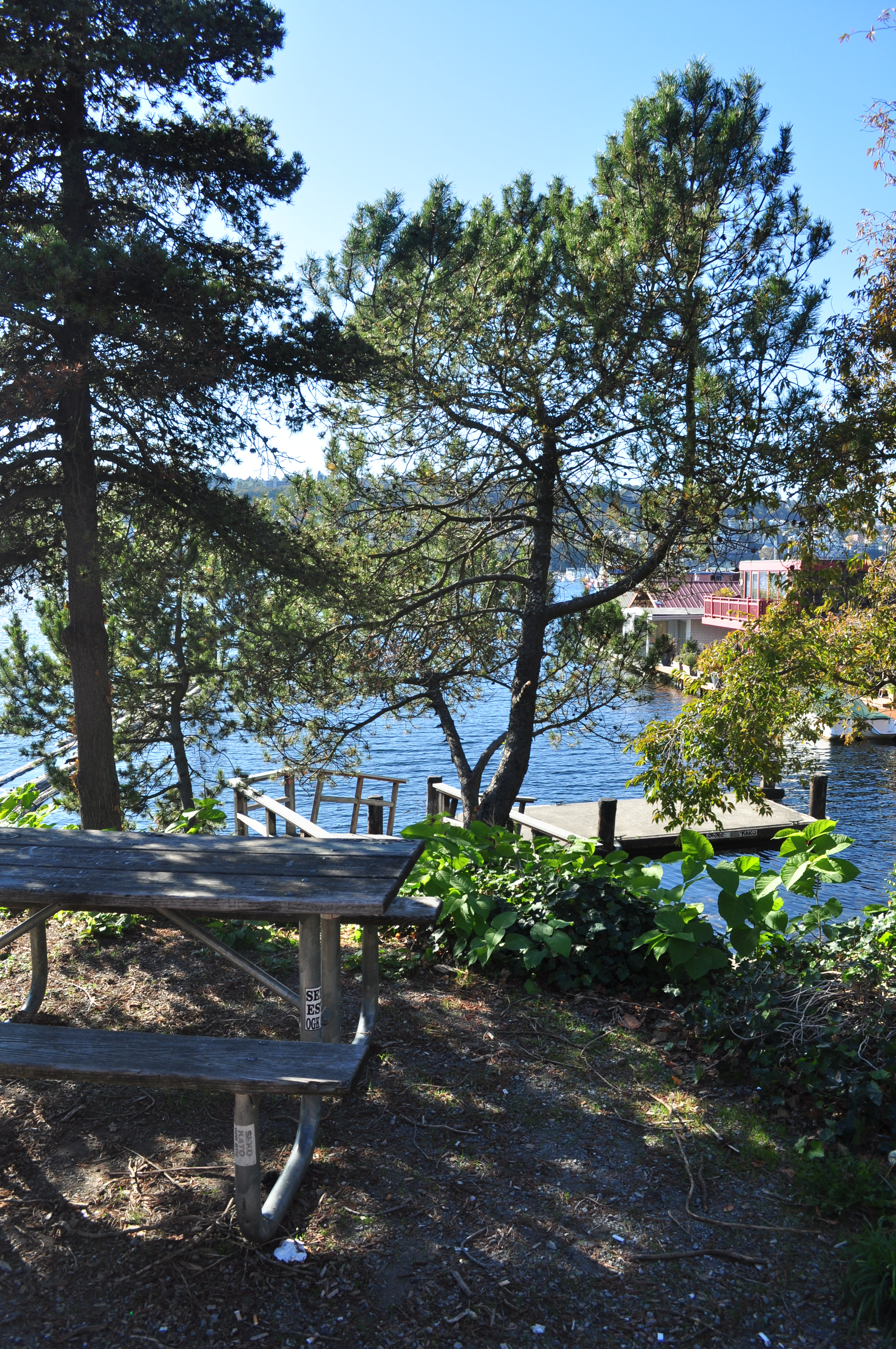
View from the land

Terry Pettus Park is a 0.9-acre (3,600 m^{2}) park located in Seattle, Washington, on the eastern shoreline of Lake Union at Fairview Avenue E. and E. Newton Street. It includes shoreline access and a public float.

The park is named after Terry Pettus, an activist who played a crucial role in saving Lake Union's houseboats.
