= Wahsayah Whitebird =

Wisconsin Communist city councilor

City Councilor of Ashland, WI
- In office April 17, 2019 – April 17, 2021
- Preceded by: David J. Mettille
- Succeeded by: Charles Ortman
- Constituency: District 6

Personal details
- Born: February 1, 1992 (age 34) Hayward, Wisconsin, U.S.
- Party: Communist

Wahsayah Whitebird (born 1992) is a member of the Communist Party of the United States who served from 2019 to 2021 on the City Council of Ashland, Wisconsin, United States. Whitebird is a Bad River Band Chippewa and while in office was one of only two Communist Party members serving as an elected official in the United States.

== Early life ==
Whitebird is a member of the Bad River Band of the Lake Superior Tribe of Chippewa Indians, a tribe whose reservation is located about 10 miles east of Ashland on the coast of Lake Superior. Whitebird worked at a deli in Ashland prior to his election and was a member of the United Food and Commercial Workers.

== Electoral history ==
Whitebird won his first election on April 2, 2019, beating incumbent David J. Mettille 52–42. Whitebird ran on issues including making housing more affordable, reducing drug abuse, and building homeless shelters. The election was nonpartisan, and Whitebird's affiliation with the Communist Party was not publicly known until after he won. Whitebird has been a member of the Communist Party since 2011. His election made him the only known Communist Party member elected to public office in the United States at the time. He did not run for re-election in 2021.

== Policy positions ==
Whitebird's policy positions are generally aligned with those of democratic socialists, though his overall political views and philosophy are more aligned with traditional Communism. Since being elected, Whitebird has announced support for policies like raising the minimum wage and implementing a Green New Deal. Whitebird expressed disdain toward school resource officers in September 2020, saying that removing them from schools was a step towards ending the "school to prison pipeline."

== See also ==
- List of Communist Party USA members who have held office in the United States
