= H. C. Armstrong (politician) =

American politician (1893–1961)

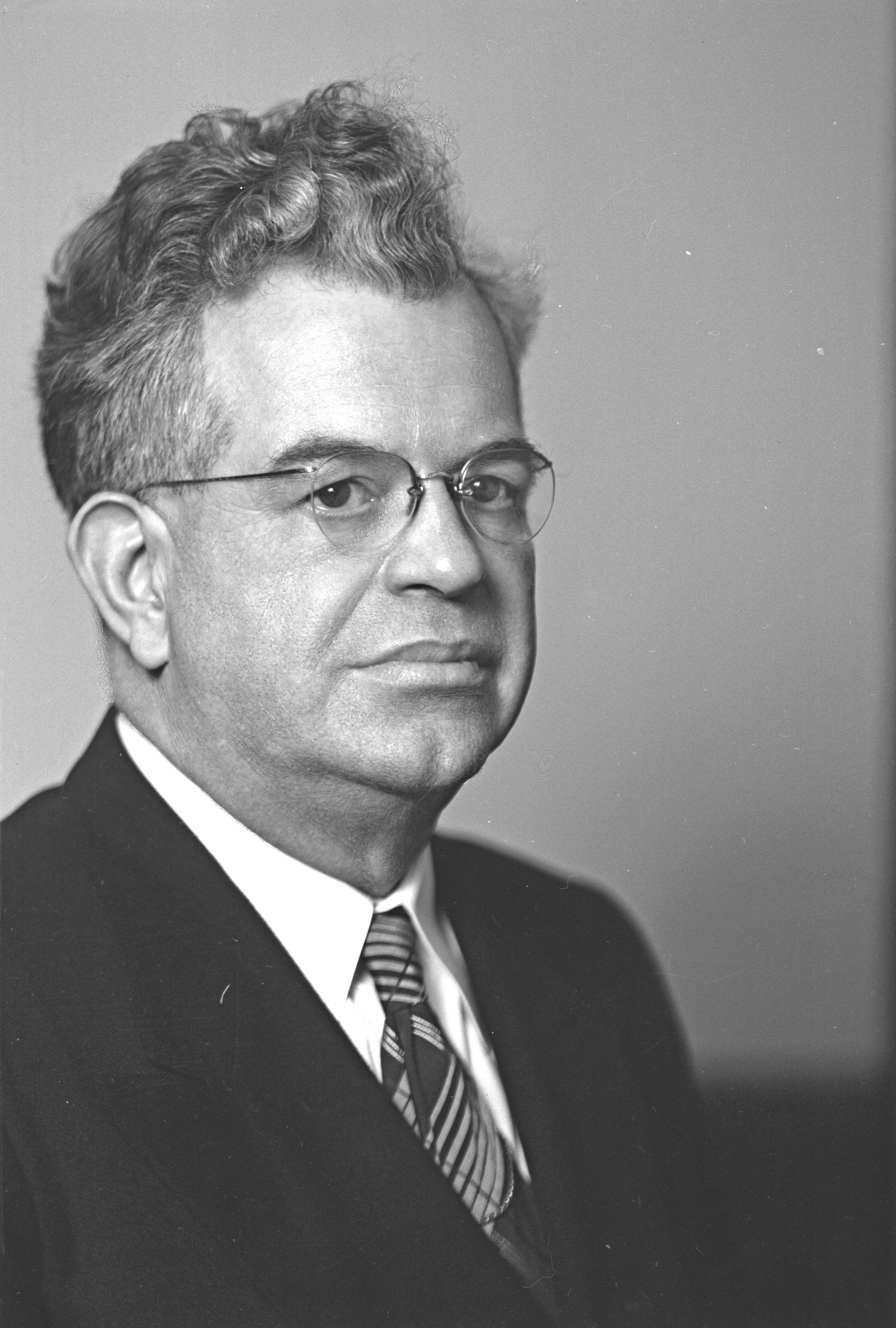
- Armstrong c. 1947

Member of the Washington House of Representatives from the 33rd district
- In office January 11, 1937 – January 10, 1949
- Preceded by: Multi-member district
- Succeeded by: Multi-member district

Personal details
- Born: c. 1893 Oregon, U.S.
- Died: c. 1961 (aged ~68) Washington, U.S.
- Party: Democratic
- Other political affiliations: Communist (secretly)

H. C. "Army" Armstrong (c. 1893–1961) was an American engineer, activist and politician who served as a member of the Washington House of Representatives from 1937 to 1949. He was an executive in the Workers Alliance of Washington, and during his tenure was known as a leading radical.

Armstrong was elected as a Democrat with the support of the Washington Commonwealth Federation, but was secretly a member of the Communist Party, a fact which he admitted to during the Canwell Committee hearings in 1948. In turn, he named several other prominent state Democrats as secret Communists.

In his 1951 appraisal of the hearings, Yale Law professor Vern Countryman characterized the testimony of former party members like Armstrong as "questionable," highlighting that they often passed off personal opinions as "official knowledge." Armstrong in particular was criticized for having twice perjured himself prior to the hearings. In her memoirs, Communist activist Hazel Wolf denounced those who testified as "stoolpigeons" and cast doubt on their "indelible... memory concerning microscopic events long gone."
