= Kathryn Fogg =

American politician (1901–1968)

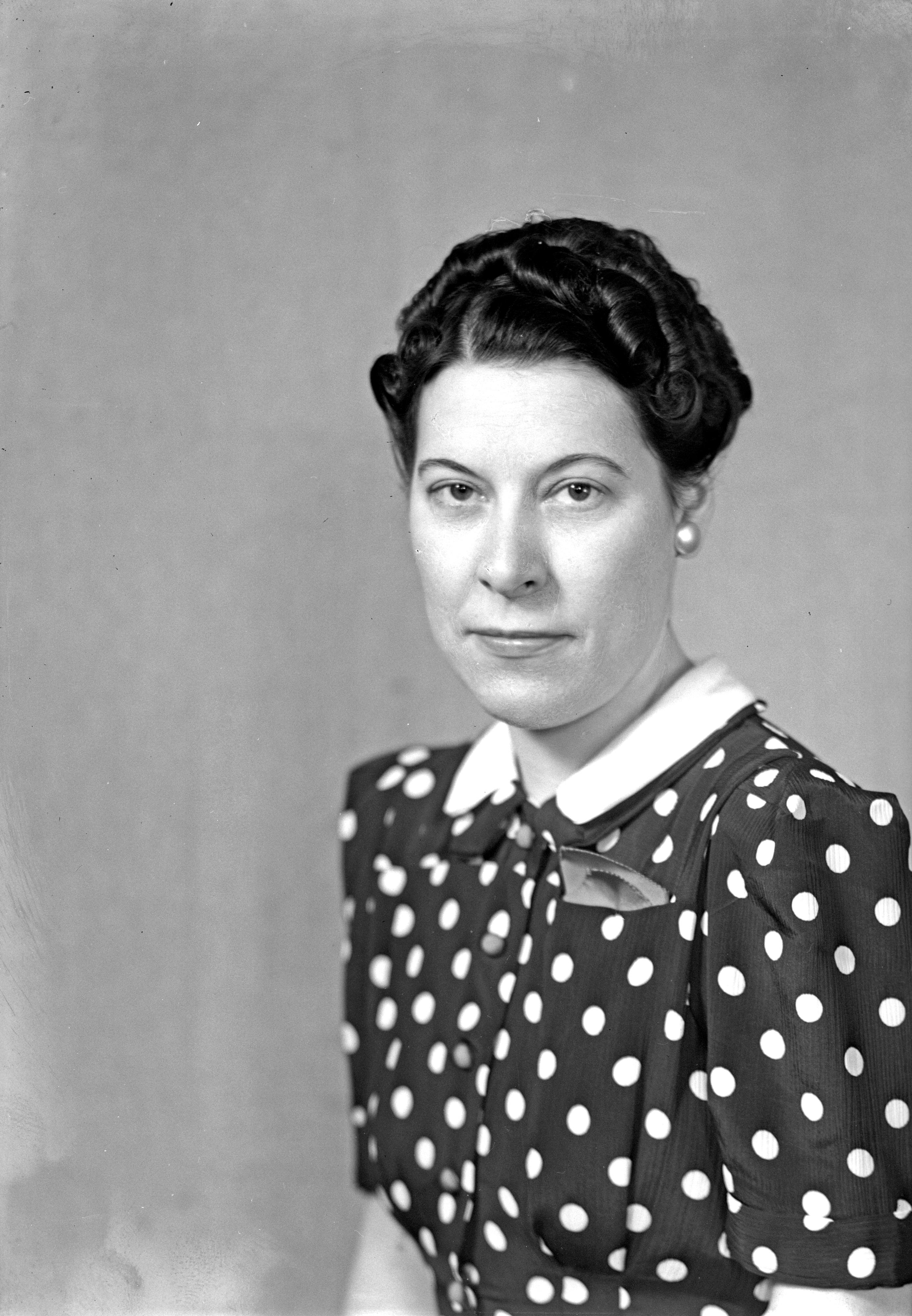
- Fogg c. 1939

Member of the Washington House of Representatives from the 31st district
- In office January 9, 1939 – January 13, 1941
- Preceded by: Multi-member district
- Succeeded by: Multi-member district

Personal details
- Born: Kathryn Farris; July 1, 1901 Idaho, U.S.
- Died: July 2, 1968 (aged 67) Seattle, Washington, U.S.
- Party: Democratic
- Other political affiliations: Communist (secretly)

Kathryn Farris Fogg (July 1, 1901 – July 2, 1968) was an American politician who served as a member of the Washington House of Representatives from 1939 to 1941.

Fogg was elected as a Democrat with the support of the Washington Commonwealth Federation, but was secretly a member of the Communist Party, a fact which she admitted to during the Canwell Committee hearings in 1948. In turn, she named several other prominent state Democrats as secret Communists.

In his 1951 appraisal of the hearings, Yale Law professor Vern Countryman characterized the testimony of former party members like Fogg as "questionable," highlighting that they often passed off personal opinions as "official knowledge." In her memoirs, Communist activist Hazel Wolf denounced those who testified as "stoolpigeons" and cast doubt on their "indelible... memory concerning microscopic events long gone."
