= Thomas C. Rabbitt =

American politician (1905–1961)

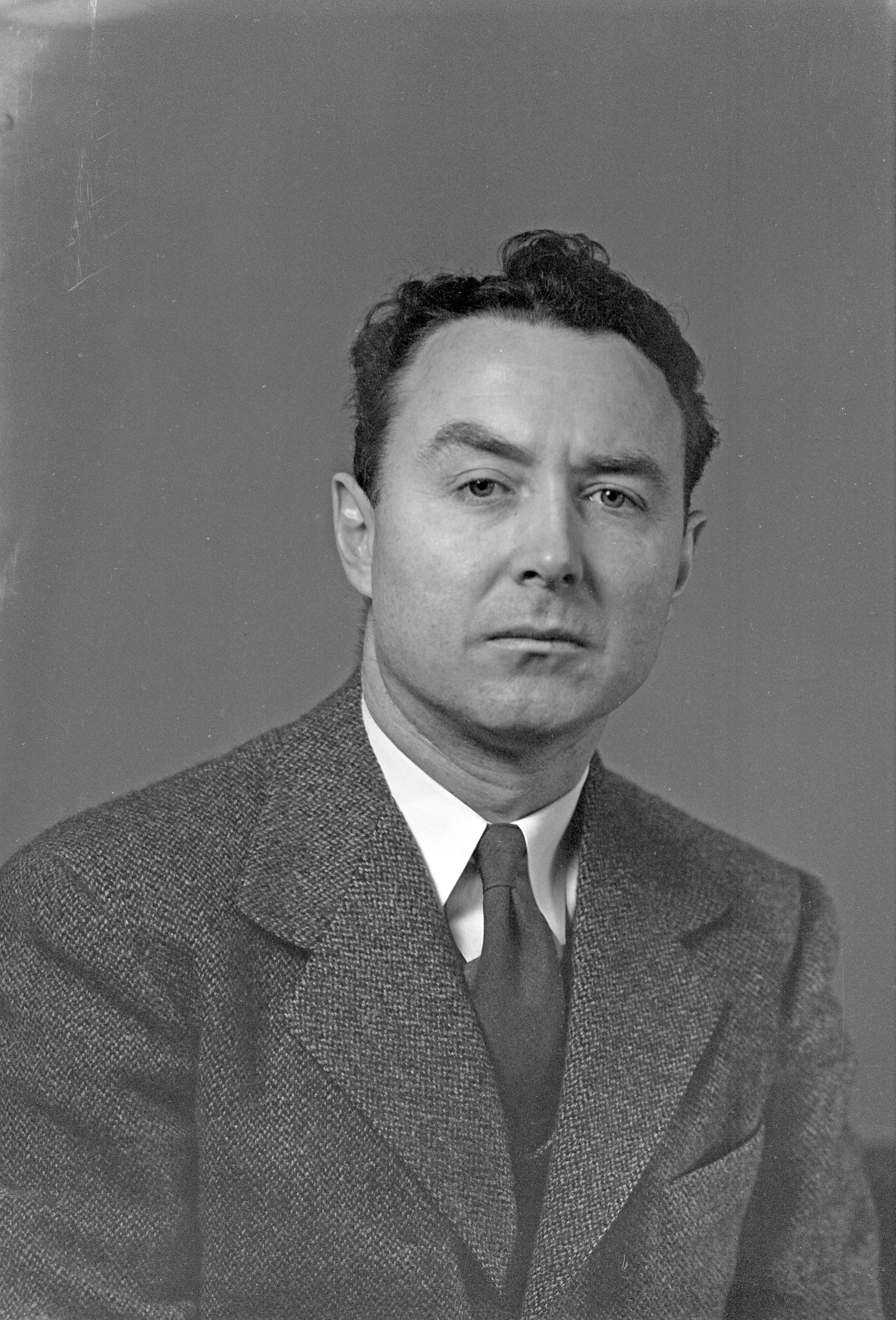
- Rabbitt c. 1943

Member of the Washington Senate from the 35th district
- In office January 11, 1943 – January 13, 1947
- Preceded by: Joseph D. Roberts
- Succeeded by: Charles J. McDonald

Personal details
- Born: May 15, 1905 Butte, Montana, U.S.
- Died: 1961 (aged 55–56)
- Party: Democratic
- Other political affiliations: Communist (disputed); Progressive (1948–1952)
- Spouse: Marjorie

Thomas Carlyle Rabbitt Jr. (May 15, 1905 – 1961) was an American activist and politician who served as a member of the Washington State Senate from 1943 to 1947, and as vice president of the Washington Pension Union from 1938 to 1961. (Note: Although the University of Washington states that he became vice president in 1938, newspaper accounts do not list him among the organization's elected officials in 1938. By the beginning of 1941, he was reported to be vice president.)

He was elected as a Democrat with the support of the Washington Commonwealth Federation, but during the Canwell Committee hearings in 1948 he was charged with being a secret member of the Communist Party by several former party members. Rabbitt attacked their testimony as hearsay and challenged the legality of the hearings. When he was called to testify before the House Un-American Activities Committee in 1954, he was allowed to do so in a closed hearing due to health concerns, and afterward stated that he had refused to answer questions.

In a 2002 article, the Washington District of the Communist Party claimed Rabbitt as a member.
