= Albert M. Ottenheimer =

American actor

- Born: September 6, 1904; Tacoma, Washington, United States
- Died: January 25, 1980 (aged 75); Cincinnati, Ohio, United States

Albert M. Ottenheimer (September 6, 1904 – January 25, 1980) was an American stage actor who was blacklisted in the 1950s.

Albert was born in Tacoma, Washington. He attended the University of Washington, where he graduated magna cum laude, Phi Beta Kappa in 1927. While there he worked in stage productions and worked with the school publications.

In 1928 he co-founded the Seattle Repertory Playhouse with Florence and Burton James. Two plays produced there were written by Albert, L'Envoi and Funny Man. He also wrote books, on which two musicals were produced, Calico Cargo and San Juan Story. He took a leave of absence from the Playhouse to be a screenwriter at Metro-Goldwyn-Mayer.

He was a founding member of Seattle local of the American Federation of Radio Artists and chairman of its Negotiating Committee. Where he worked in the field of labor relations. His duties included: writing exhibits and briefs for The Brotherhood in Presidential Emergency Board cases.

== Blacklisting ==
Albert was blacklisted in Seattle during the McCarthy era. Because of this listing, he moved to New York City in 1951. The Canwell Committee was investigating communist activity on the University of Washington campus during the 1940s. Albert refused to answer questions based on his activities and beliefs, and was sentenced to 30 days in jail, in addition to being put on the blacklist. The Playhouse also suffered from this and eventually closed (later reopened as the Seattle Repertory Theater).

Albert moved to New York where he joined the Equity Union in 1951. Albert worked as an actor in New York until the blacklisting caught up with him, he then turned to working as a temporary typist. By the late 1950s, he was able to resume acting.

== Broadway ==
After the return to acting, Albert began working in television serials, commercials, and dramas. But his most notable roles continued to take place on the stage. His most notable role was as Doc in West Side Story. He toured Europe in this role. While in Amsterdam he met Mies Waalewijn. Mies was also an actor. They married before Albert's return to the United States.

Other plays that Albert appeared in include:

- The Deputy
- The Tender Heel
- Mardi Gras
- Yentl
- Affair of Honor

Albert died while rehearsing for a play at the Cincinnati Playhouse in Cincinnati, Ohio, on January 25, 1980.
