= Grant C. Sisson =

American politician

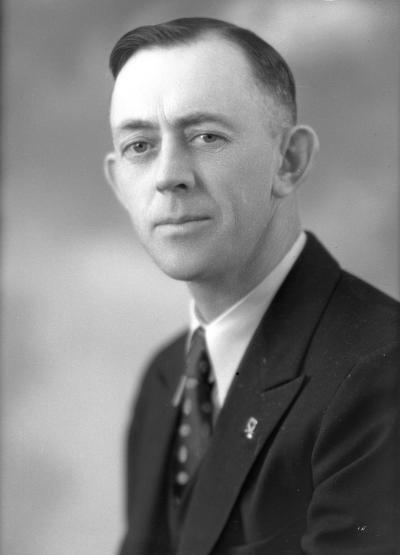
- Sisson in 1933

Member of the Washington House of Representatives for the 40th district
- In office 1933–1935; 1941–1945; 1947–1953

Member of the Washington House of Representatives for the 51st district
- In office 1923–1927

Personal details
- Born: June 23, 1885 Padilla, Washington, United States
- Died: June 13, 1956 (aged 70) Mount Vernon, Washington, United States
- Party: Republican

Grant Clark Sisson (June 23, 1885 – June 13, 1956) was an American politician in the state of Washington. He served in the Washington House of Representatives.
