= William J. Pennock =

American activist and politician (1915–1953)

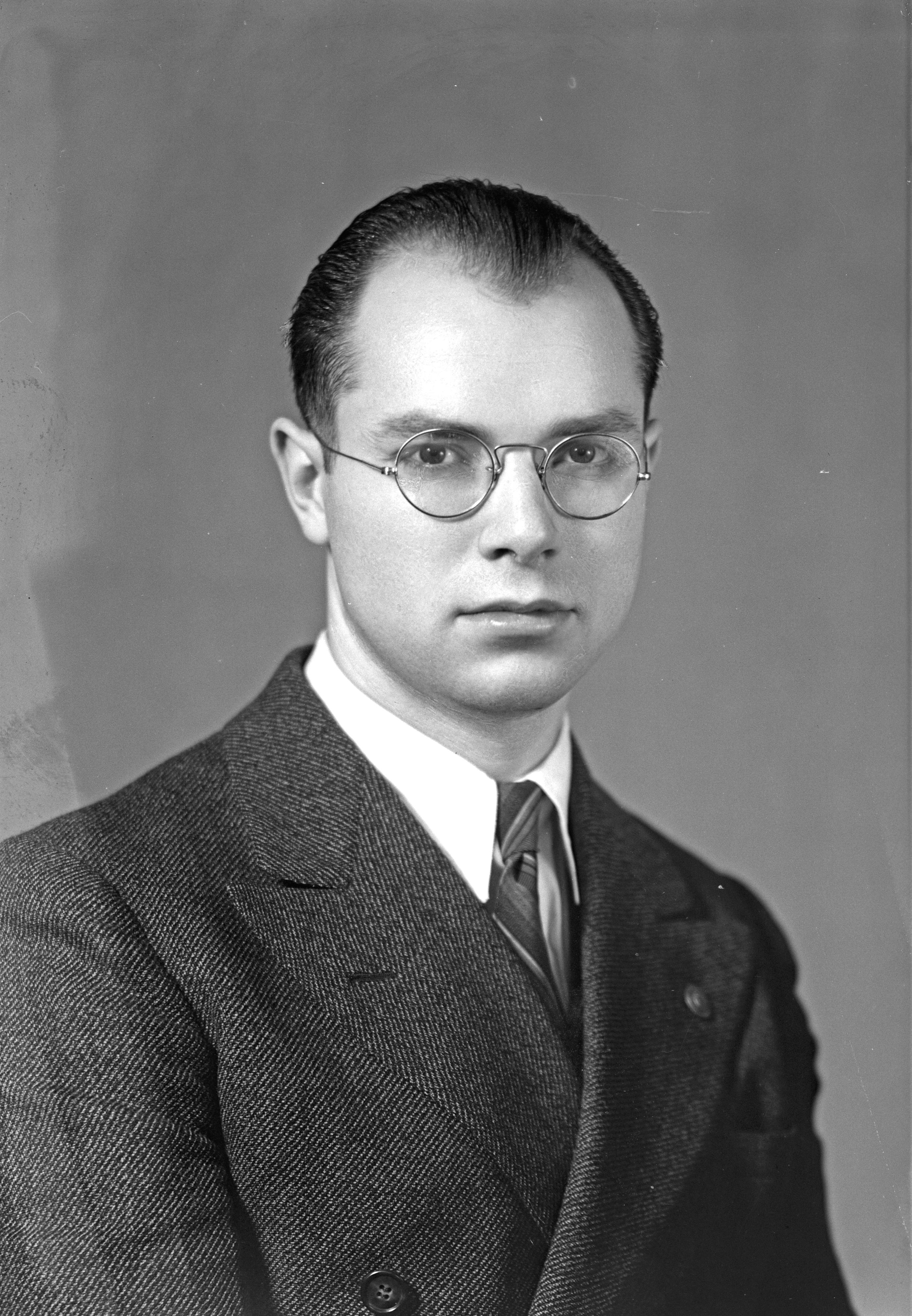
- Pennock, c. 1939

Member of the Washington House of Representatives from the 35th district
- In office January 9, 1939 – January 13, 1947
- Preceded by: Multi-member district
- Succeeded by: Multi-member district

Personal details
- Born: William Jonathan Pennock; March 10, 1915 Jamestown, New York, U.S.
- Died: August 2, 1953 (aged 38) Seattle, Washington, U.S.
- Cause of death: Suicide
- Party: Democratic
- Other political affiliations: Communist (secretly); Progressive (1948)
- Spouse: Louise
- Children: Peter
- Education: University of Washington

William Jonathan Pennock (March 10, 1915 – August 2, 1953) was an American activist and politician who served as a member of the Washington House of Representatives from 1939 to 1947, as executive secretary of the Washington Pension Union from 1938 to 1944, and as president of the WPU from 1944 until his death in 1953.

Pennock was elected as a Democrat with the support of the Washington Commonwealth Federation, but was secretly a member of the Communist Party, a fact which came to light during the Canwell Committee hearings in 1948. He was later prosecuted under the Smith Act as part of the "Seattle Seven," and committed suicide by poisoning, on August 2, 1953, aged 38. He was married with a son.
