= Hazel Wolf =

American activist and environmentalist

Hazel Wolf (March 10, 1898 – January 19, 2000) was a Seattle-based Canadian-American activist and environmentalist who lived to the age of 101. A member of the Communist Party, she was active in immigration issues and was at one point nearly deported herself, though she was later granted citizenship.

Later in life, she became known as an environmental activist and coalition builder across boundaries of race, gender, and class. Wolf also served as secretary for the Seattle Audubon Society for 35 years.

== Biography ==
Hazel Wolf was born on March 10, 1898 in Victoria, British Columbia, Canada. She grew up poor and her early years were largely dominated by class and poverty issues. Her father was a sergeant in the Canadian merchant marines and her mother was a native of Indiana.

In 1901, her brother, named after her father but generally referred to as "Sonny," was born. In 1903, her sister Dorothy was born. Her father died in 1908. Hazel was formally trained as a social worker but felt most at home among her people. This led to her involvement in the Communist party, where she felt she was doing 'real' social work.

By the time of McCarthyism, Wolf was being targeted by the United States Immigration and Naturalization Service as a subversive foreign national. Her deportation cases lasted from 1949-63. She later became a United States citizen but made no apologies for having been a member of the Communist Party. Her later years were largely dominated by her environmental activism, which led her to Washington D.C. to lobby congress on issues that were important to her. She became nationally recognized and was awarded the National Audubon Society's Medal of Excellence.

On June 12, 1999, she was the guest speaker at the AILA Annual Conference.

== Death ==
Hazel Wolf died on January 19, 2000, at 101 years of age. She commented in Studs Terkel's "Coming of Age", "I'm going to live till the year 2000, so I can have been in three centuries. Then I'm going."

== Honors ==
- Founded in 1998, the Hazel Wolf Environmental Film Festival ran for 10 years in Seattle, operated by the Hazel Wolf Environmental Film Network.
- In 1998, King County, Washington, renamed Eastside's Saddle Swamp the Hazel Wolf Wetland Preserve.
- Hazel Wolf High School was a Waldorf school that opened in 1999 and merged with Seattle Waldorf School in 2007.
- Originally the Seattle Public Schools Jane Addams K-8, a new building was built, and the school renamed the Hazel Wolf K-8 E-STEM School.
