= Barbara Weeks =

Barbara Weeks may refer to:

- Barbara Weeks (film actress) (1913–2003), American film actress
- Barbara Weeks (radio actress) (1906–1954), American radio actress
