= The Second Mrs. Burton =

American radio soap opera (1946 to 1960)

- Genre: Daytime daily serial
- Running time: 15 minutes
- Country of origin: United States
- Language: English
- Syndicates: CBS Radio
- Starring: Sharon Douglas (1941–43); Claire Niesen (1946–47); Patsy Campbell (1947–55); Jan Miner (1955–57); Teri Keane (1957–60); Dwight Weist (1946–60)
- Announcer: Hugh James; Harry Clark; Warren Sweeney
- Written by: John M. Young (1946–47); Martha Alexander (1947); Priscilla Kent (1948–52); Hector Chevigny(1952–60); Johanna Johnston(1960)
- Original release: January 7, 1946 – November 25, 1960
- No. of episodes: 3823
- Sponsored by: General Foods; Armour and Company

The Second Mrs. Burton is an American radio soap opera, broadcast daily five days a week on CBS Radio from January 7, 1946, to November 25, 1960. It was the final serial broadcast on a national radio network, after The Right to Happiness, Ma Perkins, and Young Doctor Malone.

== Plot ==
The three main characters of the show were the wealthy Stan Burton, his mother, and his wife Terry (the second Mrs. Burton of the show's title). The action was driven by the Burtons' interactions with their extended family, neighbors, and church. It was one of the first radio shows to openly address the topic of divorce and remarriage.

== Cast ==
- Terry Burton—Sharon Douglas, Claire Niesen, Patsy Campbell, Jan Miner, Teri Keane
- Stan Burton—Gale Gordon, Gary Merrill, Dwight Weist
- Mother Burton—Evelyn Varden, Charme Allen, Ethel Owen
- Marian Burton Sullivan—Anne Stone, Joan Alexander, Cathleen Cordell
- Brad Burton—Dix Davis, Karl Weber, Ben Cooper, Larry Robinson
- Marcia Burton Archer—Alice Frost
- Lew Archer—Larry Haines
- Lillian Anderson—Elspeth Eric
- Jim Anderson—King Calder
- Reverend Cornwell—Bartlett Robinson
- Don Cornwell—Robert Readick

== Production ==
The Second Mrs. Burton originally aired between 1941 and 1943 on CBS West Coast stations (airing as early as 7 February 1941), written by John M. Young, and featuring Sharon Douglas, Gale Gordon, and Ann Stone. The series premiered nationally in 1946, again written by John M. Young, and starring Claire Niesen and Gary Merrill. In March 1946, Dwight Weist replaced Merrill as the voice of Stan Burton, and would continue in the role until the end of the series. Patsy Campbell joined the series as Stan's sister "Louisa" in late January 1946, eventually taking over the leading role of Terry Burton from Niesen in October 1947 "due to a change in characterization" by new writer, Martha Alexander
