= Murder in the Air =

Murder in the Air may refer to:

== Radio, television and film ==
- Murder in the Air (film), a 1940 film starring Ronald Reagan
- "Murder in the Air" (Diagnosis: Murder), an episode of Diagnosis: Murder
- Death in the Air, also known as Murder in the Air, a 1936 American film
- Sky Dragon, also known as Murder in the Air, a 1949 mystery film
- "Murder in the Air", an episode of Inner Sanctum

== Literature ==
- Murder in the Air, a novel in the Sophie Greenway series by Ellen Hart
- Murder in the Air, a 2010 novel by Bill Crider
- Murder in the Air, a 1943 novel by Archibald Thomas Pechey
- Murder in the Air, a 1935 novel by Alfred Oliver Pollard
- Murder in the Air, a 1931 novel by Darwin Teilhet

== Music ==
- "Murder in the Air", a 12" single by Lol Coxhill
