= List of Inner Sanctum episodes =

Inner Sanctum Mystery is a radio drama that originally aired on the Blue Network between January 7, 1941, and October 5, 1952. The majority of the original episodes are thought to be lost. However, Episode 10 entitled “The Patient Vanishes,” written for March 11, 1941 airdate, exists and was written by Frank R. Gould, who also wrote Episode 1 and Episode 7. Below is a list of episodes and the original airdates.

A total of 527 episodes were produced, but a majority are presumed to be lost. Less than 200 are known to exist today. A number of the episodes that exist are edited versions that were rebroadcast on Armed Forces Radio Service (AFRS) as part of Mystery Playhouse hosted by Peter Lorre. These episodes edited out the commercials as well as the original introductions and postscripts by Raymond. They were replaced with an introduction by Peter Lorre.

== Series overview ==
Season	Episodes	Missing episodes	Originally released	
Season	Episodes	Missing episodes	First released	Last released
1	52	37	January 7, 1941	December 28, 1941
2	52	49	January 4, 1942	December 27, 1942
3	52	50	January 3, 1943	December 25, 1943
4	52	44	January 1, 1944	December 27, 1944
5	43	11	January 2, 1945	December 25, 1945
6	48	27	January 1, 1946	December 30, 1946
7	52	42	January 6, 1947	December 29, 1947
8	51	34	January 5, 1948	December 27, 1948
9	52	19	January 3, 1949	December 26, 1949
10	32	18	January 2, 1950	December 25, 1950
11	25	20	January 1, 1951	June 18, 1951
12	16	0	June 22, 1952	October 5, 1952

== Episodes ==
=== Season 1: 1941 ===
Inner Sanctum premiered on the Blue Network on January 7, 1941.

No. overall	No. in season	Title	Status	Listen	Original release date
1	1	"The Amazing Death Of Mrs Putnam"	Exists	mp3	January 7, 1941
A Mrs Putnam calls the police and tells them she is being murdered. Police Detectives Jeff Hanson and Ed "Porky" Lamb trace the call to the Putnam house and pay them a visit only to find that Mrs Putnam supposedly died 2 hours before the phone call was made. Mrs Putnam's niece, Lois, and Doctor Halloway tell the police that Mrs Putnam died from a blood clot in her heart (coronary thrombosis). But a few things don't add up and Mrs Putnam's brother, Joel Adams (the gardener) and Williamson (the butler) all had reasons to kill her. Aired on NBC and sponsored by Carter's Little Liver Pills. Note: The episode "Death for Sale" from July 13, 1952 was mistakenly thought to be from this date.
2	2	"Nursery Rhyme Murders"	Lost	-	January 14, 1941
3	3	"The Magic Curse"	Lost	-	January 21, 1941
4	4	"The Vampire Strikes"	Lost	-	January 28, 1941
5	5	"Murder in the Air"	Lost	-	February 4, 1941
6	6	"Mystery of the Howling Dog"	Lost	-	February 11, 1941
Note: This show is presumed lost. The show "The Amazing Death Of Mrs Putnam" from January 7, 1941 was mistakenly labeled "Mystery of the Howling Dog".
7	7	"The Case of the Strangled Snake"	Exists	TBA	February 18, 1941
Starring Myron McCormick. Written by Frank Gould. Note: This episode exists in the Library of Congress.
8	8	"The Bloody Toupee"	Lost	-	February 25, 1941
9	9	"Opera Of Terror"	Lost	-	March 4, 1941
11	11	"The Man of Steel"	Exists	TBA	March 16, 1941
Starring Boris Karloff; Note: This episode exists in the Library of Congress.
12	12	"The Man Who Hated Death"	Exists	TBA	March 23, 1941
Starring Boris Karloff
13	13	"The Mad Doctor"	Lost	-	March 30, 1941
Starring George Coulouris
14	14	"Death in the Zoo"	Lost	-	April 6, 1941
Starring Boris Karloff
15	15	"The Bells of Death"	Lost	-	April 13, 1941
16	16	"Fog"	Exists	TBA	April 20, 1941
Starring Boris Karloff
17	17	"Death in a Dream"	Lost	-	April 27, 1941
18	18	"The Horla"	Lost	-	May 4, 1941
Starring Paul Lukas; Note: This show has the same title as the August 1, 1943 episode.
19	19	"Imperfect Crime"	Lost	-	May 11, 1941
Starring Boris Karloff
20	20	"Dead Freight"	Lost	-	May 18, 1941
Starring Peggy Conklin, Myron McCormick; Note: Episodes labelled "Dead Freight" actually turn out to be "Death Pays the Freight" starring Everett Sloane from either July 6, 1952 or October 5, 1952.
21	21	"Death Is a Joker"	Lost	-	May 25, 1941
Starring Paul Lukas; Note: This show is presumed lost. This show has the same title as "Death Is a Joker" from June 10, 1944, but is performed by different voice actors and may be a modified story.
22	22	"Fall of the House of Usher"	Lost	-	June 1, 1941
Starring Boris Karloff
23	23	"The Kabbala"	Lost	-	June 8, 1941
Starring Donald Cook, Claudia Morgan
24	24	"Murder in the Mind"	Lost	-	June 15, 1941
Starring Paul Lukas
25	25	"Green-Eyed Bat"	Lost	-	June 22, 1941
Starring Boris Karloff
26	26	"The Man Who Painted Death"	Lost	-	June 29, 1941
Starring Boris Karloff
27	27	"Doom of Damballa"	Lost	-	July 6, 1941
Starring Paul Lukas
28	28	"Death Is a Murderer"	Lost	-	July 13, 1941
Starring Boris Karloff
29	29	"The Eye of Shiva"	Lost	-	July 20, 1941
Starring Paul Lukas
30	30	"The Button"	Lost	-	July 27, 1941
Note: This show has the same title as the February 28, 1943 episode.
31	31	"The Tell-Tale Heart"	Exists	mp3	August 3, 1941
An adaptation of Edgar Allan Poe's The Tell-Tale Heart. Simon is a former musician that went tone deaf. After spending six months with Doctor Adair, he now has exceptional hearing. He meets Oliver, another patient of the doctor, who was previously blind but now can see. Simon is filled with love having regained his hearing, but Oliver is still bitter from his previous blindness. Simon is very troubled to find out that Oliver wants to spread hate and misery when he kills a bird that Simon was trying to save. Simon decides that Oliver is a danger to society. Starring Boris Karloff (as Simon), Everett Sloane (as Dr. Adaire) and Santos Ortega. Written by Robert Newman. Aired on the Blue Network and sponsored by Carter's Little Liver Pills.
32	32	"The Death Ship"	Exists	mp3	August 10, 1941
A ship, the Mary Kay, sailing the Caribbean, crashes on a reef off Skeleton Key and loses all hands except 5 men. One of the men is dying and accuses Captain Pike of murder. He puts a curse on the Captain and another man right before he dies. The remaining men find another ship and board it, hoping to be rescued, only to find it abandoned and filled with pirate treasure. One of the men says they're hallucinating the whole thing and that they're actually dead. Starring Paul Lukas, Arthur Vinton (as Captain Pike), Myron McCormick (as Tom) and Gilbert Mack (as Fred). Written by Robert Newman. Sponsored by Carter's Little Liver Pills.
33	33	"The Dark Squadron"	Lost	-	August 17, 1941
Starring Paul Lukas
34	34	"The Wail of Death"	Lost	-	August 24, 1941
35	35	"The Hands of Death"	Lost	-	August 31, 1941
Starring George Coulouris; Note: This show has the same title as the September 29, 1947 episode.
36	36	"The Hunter from Beyond"	Exists	mp3	September 7, 1941
A man and a woman are on top of a mountain and find out the woman's father was killed by being sprayed with liquid air. They also find a prehistoric hunter from 100,000 years ago, frozen in the ice. As they are climbing down, a second man is trying to kill them by untying their rope. This causes an avalanche that kills the second man. Note: The version of this show that exists is a partial episode and only includes the last 5:24 minutes of the original 25:00 minute program.
37	37	"The Stallion of Death"	Exists	TBA	September 14, 1941
Note: This episode exists in the Library of Congress.
38	38	"Death Goes to a Party"	Lost	-	September 21, 1941
Starring Ralph Forbes
39	39	"The Haunting Face"	Exists	TBA	September 28, 1941
Starring Claude Rains; Note: This episode exists in the Library of Congress.
40	40	"Dead Man's Rock"	Lost	-	October 5, 1941
Starring Everett Sloane
41	41	"Horror Hotel"	Lost	-	October 12, 1941
42	42	"Hell Is Where You Find It"	Exists	mp3	October 19, 1941
Starring Burgess Meredith
43	43	"Terror on Bailey Street"	Lost	-	October 26, 1941
Starring Boris Karloff
44	44	"Nocturne of Death"	Exists	TBA	November 2, 1941
Starring Everett Sloane; Note: This episode exists in the Library of Congress.
45	45	"The Living Dead"	Lost	-	November 9, 1941
Note: This show has the same title as the November 22, 1944 episode.
46	46	"The Corpse Who Came to Dinner"	Lost	-	November 16, 1941
Starring Arnold Moss
47	47	"The Man from Outside"	Lost	-	November 23, 1941
48	48	"The Accusing Corpse"	Lost	-	November 30, 1941
Note: This show has the same title as the October 16, 1943 episode.
49	49	"Island of Death"	Exists	mp3	December 7, 1941
John and Muriele lose their way while driving in a storm on Haiti. They see an old man and try to get his attention by honking at him when their horn mysteriously stops working. The old man says he stopped the horn and gives them directions to their friend Alan's plantation. Muriele wonders if the old man was a witch doctor. Once at Alan's plantation, they are told stories about the local voodoo. When John wants to find out more, Pierre does some voodoo with some knuckle bones and predicts an unhappy future. Written by Robert Newman. Aired on the Blue Network and sponsored by Carter's Little Liver Pills. Note: This show begins with a 25 second news report about the attack on Pearl Harbor that happened earlier the same day of the broadcast, December 7, 1941.
50	50	"The Song of Doom"	Lost	-	December 14, 1941
Note: This show has the same title as the January 22, 1944 episode.
51	51	"The Man from Yesterday"	Exists	mp3	December 21, 1941
Doctor Robert Rand, and his museum crew, visit Africa to catch a large gorilla named Ungagi. Doctor Rand and his wife Ruth bring Ungagi back to New York with them to go in a zoo. Ruth teaches Ungagi a trick on the way there, how to shake hands with a lady. Ungagi ends up taking Ruth's wedding ring, but learns to give it back. They deliver Ungagi to Professor Carver's museum. As time goes on, Ungagi seems to remember Dr. Rand from somewhere. We hear Ungagi's thoughts as he remembers a memory from another gorilla from 10,000 years ago. In Ungagi's thoughts, he hears the voice of the jungle speaking to him and telling him of a similar human to Dr, Rand and an awful experience from the past. Starring Anne Seymour, Myron McCormick and written by Milton Geiger. Aired on NBC and sponsored by Carter's Little Liver Pills.
52	52	"Death Has Claws"	Exists	mp3	December 28, 1941
Dan Kirsch lives in an apartment building on Bailey Street and has not been able to sleep for three nights because of cats howling in the alley. Mr. Kirsch grabs his bat to go out to silence the cats, but is confronted by Harold Higgins who and tells him to leave the cats alone. When Mr. Kirsch swings the bat to kill the cats, Mr. Higgins intervenes and kills him. The police investigate the murder and question Mrs. Kirsch, who doesn't know anything. The police decide to question all the tenants of the apartment building, starting with Mr. Higgins. They question Higgins for a bit, and when they're leaving, one of the cops steps on his cat's tail which infuriates Mr. Higgins. The police leave, but say they'll keep an eye on him. Starring Santos Ortega (as Harold Higgins) and written by Sigmund Miller; Aired on the Blue Network and sponsored by Carter's Little Liver Pills.

=== Season 2: 1942 ===
No. overall	No. in season	Title	Status	Listen	Original release date
53	1	"Appointment for Murder"	Lost	-	January 4, 1942
54	2	"Scarlet Widow"	Exists	TBA	January 11, 1942
Note: This episode exists in the Library of Congress.
55	3	"Dead Reckoning" "a.k.a. Thing From the Sea"	Exists	mp3	January 18, 1942
A tramp steamer is sailing through the fog off the Great Banks on the eastern seaboard. Mr. Ross and the Captain see a schooner come out of the fog off the port bow. They have to react fast to miss running into it. Joe Banning dives off the schooner and swims to the ship. He tells the Captain that everybody aboard was killed by a thing from the sea. Several of the crew take a small boat to the schooner and board her to investigate. They find the ship abandoned and return to their tramp steamer when they start getting nervous. Banning tells the Captain the story of how the water aboard turned to blood and how the crew started disappearing one by one. Starring Arthur Vinton (as Captain Big) and written by Robert Newman. Aired on the Blue Network and sponsored by Carter's Little Liver Pills.
56	4	"Death Has a Sculptor"	Lost	-	January 25, 1942
57	5	"Death Has Wings"	Lost	-	February 1, 1942
58	6	"The Phantom Express"	Lost	-	February 8, 1942
59	7	"Death Strikes Twice"	Lost	-	February 15, 1942
60	8	"Pact of Death"	Lost	-	February 22, 1942
61	9	"Ghost Town"	Lost	-	March 1, 1942
62	10	"The Black Swamp"	Lost	-	March 8, 1942
63	11	"The Mask of Death"	Lost	-	March 15, 1942
64	12	"Death Strikes Back"	Lost	-	March 22, 1942
65	13	"Death, the Huntsman"	Lost	-	March 29, 1942
66	14	"The Fall of the House of Usher"	Lost	-	April 5, 1942
Starring Boris Karloff
67	15	"The Haunted Mine"	Lost	-	April 12, 1942
68	16	"Blackstone"	Lost	-	April 19, 1942
Starring Boris Karloff
69	17	"The Man Who Died Again"	Lost	-	April 26, 1942
70	18	"A Study for Murder"	Exists	mp3	May 3, 1942
Starring Boris Karloff
71	19	"Death Calls at 12:00"	Lost	-	May 10, 1942
72	20	"The Last Performance"	Lost	-	May 17, 1942
73	21	"The Cone"	Lost	-	May 24, 1942
Starring Boris Karloff
74	22	"Death Wears My Face"	Lost	-	May 31, 1942
Starring Boris Karloff
75	23	"Strange Request"	Lost	-	June 7, 1942
Starring Boris Karloff
76	24	"Terrible Vengeance"	Lost	-	June 14, 1942
Note: The original version of this story is thought to be lost. The only known version to exist is an Australian broadcast from 1952.
77	25	"The Grey Wolf"	Lost	-	June 21, 1942
Starring Boris Karloff
78	26	"Meeting in the Madhouse"	Lost	-	June 28, 1942
79	27	"Terror Is a Double-Edged Sword"	Lost	-	July 5, 1942
80	28	"Road to Death"	Lost	-	July 12, 1942
81	29	"The Garden of Death"	Lost	-	July 19, 1942
82	30	"Strange Cat"	Lost	-	July 26, 1942
83	31	"Death Keeps a Date"	Lost	-	August 2, 1942
84	32	"Death Has Four Faces"	Lost	-	August 9, 1942
85	33	"Moon Murders"	Lost	-	August 16, 1942
86	34	"Dead Man's Magic"	Lost	-	August 23, 1942
Note: This show is presumed lost. The show "No Rest For The Dead" from August 24, 1952 was mistakenly labeled "Dead Man's Magic".
87	35	"Visitor at Midnight"	Lost	-	August 30, 1942
88	36	"Design for Dying"	Lost	-	September 6, 1942
89	37	"Death's Four Faces"	Lost	-	September 13, 1942
90	38	"The Dead Walk at Night"	Lost	-	September 20, 1942
Note: This show has the same title as the September 28, 1952 episode. The show from 1942 is presumed lost, but the 1952 version with Donald Buka does exists. The 1942 version does not star Donald Buka.
91	39	"The Man Who Played with Death"	Lost	-	September 27, 1942
Starring Claude Rains
92	40	"Death's Revenge"	Lost	-	October 4, 1942
93	41	"The King of Darkness"	Lost	-	October 11, 1942
Starring Claude Rains
94	42	"The Killer and the Moth"	Lost	-	October 18, 1942
95	43	"The Deadly Parrot"	Lost	-	October 25, 1942
96	44	"The Gunman and the Ghost"	Lost	-	November 1, 1942
Starring Arnold Moss
97	45	"The Laughing Murderer"	Lost	-	November 8, 1942
Starring Claude Rains; Note: This show has the same title as the April 29, 1944 episode.
98	46	"Return from the Unknown"	Lost	-	November 15, 1942
99	47	"The Cat and the Killer"	Lost	-	November 22, 1942
100	48	"The Murders in the Morgue"	Lost	-	November 29, 1942
Starring Peter Lorre
101	49	"The Mummy's Curse"	Lost	-	December 6, 1942
102	50	"The Man Who Returned from the Dead"	Lost	-	December 13, 1942
103	51	"The Doomed Ship"	Lost	-	December 20, 1942
104	52	"Dig My Grave"	Lost	-	December 27, 1942
Starring Peter Lorre

=== Season 3: 1943 ===
No. overall	No. in season	Title	Status	Listen	Original release date
105	1	"Mystery of the Great Forest"	Lost	-	January 3, 1943
106	2	"The Killer Pleads Guilty"	Lost	-	January 10, 1943
107	3	"The Ring of Death"	Lost	-	January 17, 1943
Starring Chester Morris
108	4	"The Hound of Death"	Lost	-	January 24, 1943
109	5	"Death at Moordan Castle"	Lost	-	January 31, 1943
110	6	"Ring of Death"	Lost	-	February 7, 1943
Starring Peter Lorre
111	7	"River of Blood"	Lost	-	February 14, 1943
112	8	"Screams in the Night"	Lost	-	February 21, 1943
Starring Martha Scott (same show title as 1946-05-14 episode)
113	9	"The Button"	Lost	-	February 28, 1943
(same show title as 1941-07-27 episode)
114	10	"The Black Sea Gull"	Exists	mp3	March 7, 1943
Starring Peter Lorre
115	11	"Woman of Death"	Lost	-	March 14, 1943
116	12	"Death on Merle Street"	Lost	-	March 21, 1943
117	13	"Double Death"	Lost	-	March 28, 1943
Starring Judith Evelyn
118	14	"The Ring of Doom"	Lost	-	April 4, 1943
119	15	"The Dead Want Company"	Lost	-	April 11, 1943
120	16	"The Unforgettable Face"	Lost	-	April 18, 1943
121	17	"The Voice in the Night"	Lost	-	April 25, 1943
122	18	"Death Builds a House"	Lost	-	May 2, 1943
123	19	"One Must Die"	Lost	-	May 9, 1943
Starring Lesley Woods, Anne Seymour
124	20	"Death from a Stranger"	Lost	-	May 16, 1943
125	21	"Death Comes Calling"	Lost	-	May 23, 1943
Starring Arnold Moss
126	22	"Death at the Zoo"	Lost	-	May 30, 1943
Starring Akim Tamiroff
127	23	"The House Where Death Lived"	Lost	-	June 6, 1943
An episode with this title was 45-06-05 Death Across the Board
128	24	"Murder by Mistake"	Lost	-	June 13, 1943
129	25	"The Smiling Killer"	Lost	-	June 20, 1943
130	26	"The House by the Sea"	Lost	-	June 27, 1943
131	27	"Cups of Death"	Lost	-	July 4, 1943
132	28	"Mr De Capello"	Lost	-	July 11, 1943
133	29	"The Temple of Isis"	Lost	-	July 18, 1943
134	30	"Dying To Meet You"	Lost	-	July 25, 1943
135	31	"The Horla"	Exists	mp3	August 1, 1943
Starring Arnold Moss (same show title as 1941-05-04 episode)
136	32	"The House of Death"	Lost	-	August 8, 1943
(same show title as 1944-11-11 episode)
137	33	"Death and the Lady Diana"	Lost	-	August 15, 1943
138	34	"The Bog-Oak Necklace"	Lost	-	August 22, 1943
Note: The episode "The Bog-Oak Necklace" from April 10, 1945 was mistakenly thought to be from this date.
139	35	"The Thirteenth Chime"	Lost	-	August 29, 1943
Starring Arnold Moss
140	36	"The Death and the Detective"	Lost	-	September 4, 1943
Starring Everett Sloane
141	37	"Mr Zenith"	Lost	-	September 11, 1943
142	38	"Return to Death"	Lost	-	September 18, 1943
143	39	"The Smiling Skull"	Lost	-	September 25, 1943
Starring Miriam Hopkins
144	40	"The Man Who Died Twice"	Lost	-	October 2, 1943
Starring Arnold Moss
145	41	"Death Walks on Padded Feet"	Lost	-	October 9, 1943
146	42	"The Accusing Corpse"	Lost	-	October 16, 1943
Starring Martin Gabel, Mariam Hopkins (same show title as 1941-11-30 episode)
147	43	"Death's Candle Stick"	Lost	-	October 23, 1943
148	44	"The Man Who Had No Heart"	Lost	-	October 30, 1943
149	45	"Death Shines a Light"	Lost	-	November 6, 1943
150	46	"Death Is a Blind Man"	Lost	-	November 13, 1943
Starring Joseph Cotten
151	47	"A Vision Of Death"	Lost	-	November 20, 1943
152	48	"Death Strikes the Keys"	Lost	-	November 27, 1943
Starring Orson Welles
153	49	"Death Has a Vacancy"	Lost	-	December 4, 1943
154	50	"Speak of the Dead"	Lost	-	December 11, 1943
155	51	"Dreadful Tapestry"	Lost	-	December 18, 1943
Starring Judith Evelyn
156	52	"Death Is a Madman"	Lost	-	December 25, 1943
Starring Leslie Woods

=== Season 4: 1944 ===
There was no episode broadcast on August 12, 1944, because of a speech by President Roosevelt.

No. overall	No. in season	Title	Status	Listen	Original release date
157	1	"The Train to Glory"	Lost	-	January 1, 1944
Starring Joseph Julian
158	2	"The Death Laugh"	Exists	mp3	January 8, 1944
Starring Laird Cregar
159	3	"The Huntress"	Lost	-	January 15, 1944
Starring Martin Gabel
160	4	"The Song of Doom"	Lost	-	January 22, 1944
Starring Laird Cregar (same show title as 1941-12-14 episode)
161	5	"The Dead Walk Tonight"	Lost	-	January 29, 1944
Starring Martin Gabel
162	6	"Dealer in Death"	Lost	-	February 5, 1944
Starring Laird Cregar
163	7	"Dream Death"	Lost	-	February 12, 1944
Starring Martin Gabel
164	8	"Death Steals the Scene"	Lost	-	February 19, 1944
165	9	"Mysterious Stranger"	Lost	-	February 26, 1944
Starring Ann Sheperd
166	10	"The Wolf Woman"	Lost	-	March 4, 1944
Starring Akim Tamiroff
167	11	"The Valse Triste"	Lost	-	March 11, 1944
Starring Written by Arch Oboler
168	12	"The Wings of Death"	Lost	-	March 18, 1944
Starring Akim Tamiroff
169	13	"The Room for the Standing Dead"	Lost	-	March 25, 1944
Starring Leslie Woods
170	14	"The Shriveled Head"	Lost	-	April 1, 1944
Starring Lional Barrymore
171	15	"Death Tonight Can Wait"	Lost	-	April 8, 1944
Starring Leslie Woods
172	16	"The Skull That Walked"	Exists	mp3	April 15, 1944
173	17	"The Melody of Death"	Exists	mp3	April 22, 1944
Starring Mary Astor
174	18	"The Laughing Murderer"	Lost	-	April 29, 1944
Starring Adolphe Menjou (same show title as 1942-11-08 episode)
175	19	"Death and the Bolero"	Lost	-	May 6, 1944
Starring Margo
176	20	"The Silent Hands"	Exists	mp3	May 13, 1944
Starring Mary Astor
177	21	"The Dead Refuse to Die"	Lost	-	May 20, 1944
Starring Berry Kroeger
178	22	"The Haunted Guitar"	Lost	-	May 27, 1944
Starring Margo
179	23	"Black Angel"	Lost	-	June 3, 1944
180	24	"Death Is a Joker"	Exists	mp3	June 10, 1944
Charles Rupert is an actor and comedian, accused of murder, who is explaining his story to a jury. Charles had visited the apartment of his friend, Robert Langwell, to talk about Robert's upcoming marriage to Julie Winthrop. Charles tells Robert he shouldn't marry Julie and admits he is in love with Julie. Robert laughs at the idea of Charles being in love with Julie, which infuriates Charles to no end and causes him to kill his friend, Robert. Starring Peter Lorre (as Charles Rupert). Note: The version of this show that exists is a Mystery Playhouse (1944) re-broadcast for the Armed Forces Radio Service. The commercials and closing were edited out as well as most of the introduction. These were replaced with an introduction by Peter Lorre. This show has the same title as "Death Is a Joker" from May 25, 1941, but is performed by different voice actors and may be a modified story.
181	25	"The Mind Reader"	Lost	-	June 17, 1944
Starring Peter Lorre (same show title as 1947-10-20 episode)
182	26	"Cypress Island"	Lost	-	June 24, 1944
Starring Leslie Woods
183	27	"Death Is a Delusion"	Lost	-	July 1, 1944
184	28	"The Hanging Puppet"	Lost	-	July 8, 1944
185	29	"The Spider and the Lady"	Lost	-	July 15, 1944
186	30	"The Blue Tie"	Lost	-	July 22, 1944
187	31	"The Mad House (Part 1)"	Lost	-	July 29, 1944
Starring Margo
188	32	"The Mad House (Part 2)"	Lost	-	August 5, 1944
Starring Margo
189	33	"Toccato Murder"	Lost	-	August 19, 1944
190	34	"Tomb of Ramhotys"	Lost	-	August 26, 1944
191	35	"Murder in the Museum"	Lost	-	September 2, 1944
192	36	"Boy Butcher"	Lost	-	September 9, 1944
193	37	"One Foot in the Grave"	Lost	-	September 16, 1944
Starring Peter Lorre
194	38	"The Dream"	Lost	-	September 23, 1944
Starring Orson Welles
195	39	"Premonition"	Lost	-	September 30, 1944
Starring Anne Seymour
196	40	"Dead Man's Vengeance" "Raymond Meets Gideon Blake"	Exists	mp3	October 7, 1944
Starring Raymond Edward Johnson
197	41	"The Deadly Ring"	Lost	-	October 14, 1944
(same show title as 1947-09-08 episode)
198	42	"The Grave of Marie Chandell"	Lost	-	October 21, 1944
199	43	"A Dead Woman's Tale"	Lost	-	October 28, 1944
Starring Luise Rainer
200	44	"Blind Man's Bluff"	Lost	-	November 4, 1944
201	45	"The House of Death"	Lost	-	November 11, 1944
(same show title as 1943-08-08 episode)
202	46	"The Cursed Twins"	Lost	-	November 18, 1944
Starring Berry Kroeger
203	47	"The Living Dead"	Lost	-	November 22, 1944
Starring Judith Evelyn (same show title as 1941-11-09 episode)
204	48	"The Voice on the Wire"	Exists	mp3	November 29, 1944
Starring Mary Astor
205	49	"The Color Blind Formula" "Richard Fenner"	Exists	mp3	December 6, 1944
Starring Richard Widmark
206	50	"The Man Who Died Smiling"	Lost	-	December 13, 1944
Starring Joseph Julian
207	51	"The Frightened Lady"	Lost	-	December 20, 1944
Starring Leslie Woods
208	52	"Death Dream"	Lost	-	December 27, 1944
Starring Santos Ortega

=== Season 5: 1945 ===
There was no episode broadcast on May 8, 1945, because of V-E Day.

No. overall	No. in season	Title	Status	Listen	Original release date
209	1	"Murdered Do Not Die"	Lost	-	January 2, 1945
Starring Clifton Webb
210	2	"Desert Death"	Exists	mp3	January 9, 1945
Starring Horace Graham
211	3	"Death and the Dolls"	Lost	-	January 16, 1945
Starring Leslie Woods
212	4	"Death Is an Artist"	Exists	mp3	January 23, 1945
Starring Lee Bowman
213	5	"The Hand"	Lost	-	January 30, 1945
Starring Judith Evelyn
214	6	"Death in the Depths"	Exists	mp3	February 6, 1945
Starring Santos Ortega
215	7	"Ends of the Earth"	Lost	-	February 13, 1945
Starring Richard Arlen
216	8	"No Coffin for the Dead"	Exists	mp3	February 20, 1945
Starring Les Tremayne
217	9	"The Phantom Bell"	Lost	-	February 27, 1945
Starring Santos Ortega
218	10	"The Lost Refrain"	Exists	mp3	March 6, 1945
Starring Wendy Barrie
219	11	"Island of the Dead"	Exists	TBA	March 13, 1945
Starring Karl Swenson (there is an audio file labelled as "Island of the Dead", but it is really "Island of Death" from 1941.)
220	12	"Train to Glory"	Lost	-	March 20, 1945
Starring Jerry Wayne
221	13	"Mrs Bluebird"	Lost	-	March 27, 1945
Starring Claudia Morgan
222	14	"The Meek Die Slowly"	Exists	mp3	April 3, 1945
Starring Victor Moore (same show title as 1952-09-07 episode)
223	15	"The Bog-Oak Necklace"	Exists	mp3	April 10, 1945
Starring Miriam Hopkins (same show title as 1943-08-22 episode)
224	16	"The Judas Clock"	Exists	mp3	April 17, 1945
Starring Barry Kroeger, Jackson Beck, Santos Ortega
225	17	"Song of the Slasher"	Exists	mp3	April 24, 1945
Starring Arnold Moss
226	18	"The Girl and the Gallows"	Exists	mp3	May 1, 1945
Starring Wendy Barrie
227	19	"The Black Art" "Lady is a Witch"	Exists	mp3	May 15, 1945
Starring Simone Simon (same show title as 1948-02-16 episode)
228	20	"Dead to Rights"	Exists	mp3	May 22, 1945
Starring Elspeth Eric, Santos Ortega
229	21	"Musical Score"	Exists	mp3	May 29, 1945
Starring Berry Kroeger
230	22	"Death Across the Board"	Exists	mp3	June 5, 1945
Starring Raymond Massey, Jackson Beck
231	23	"Portrait of Death"	Exists	mp3	June 12, 1945
Starring Leslie Woods
232	24	"Dead Man's Holiday"	Exists	mp3	June 19, 1945
Starring Myron McCormick (same show title as 1950-09-18 episode)
233	25	"Dead Man's Debt"	Exists	mp3	June 26, 1945
Starring Joseph Julian
234	26	"Dead Man's Deal"	Exists	mp3	August 28, 1945
Starring Larry Haines
235	27	"The Murder Prophet"	Exists	mp3	September 4, 1945
Starring Wendy Berrie (same show title as 1952-07-27 episode)
236	28	"The Last Story"	Exists	mp3	September 11, 1945
Starring Richard Widmark
237	29	"Terror by Night"	Exists	mp3	September 18, 1945
Starring Anne Shepherd (same show title as 1947-05-19, 1952-06-29 episodes)
238	30	"The Lonely Sleep"	Exists	mp3	September 25, 1945
Starring Karl Swenson
239	31	"The Shadow of Death"	Exists	mp3	October 2, 1945
Starring Richard Widmark
240	32	"Death by Scripture"	Exists	mp3	October 9, 1945
Starring Stefen Schnabel
241	33	"Till Death Do Us Part"	Exists	mp3	October 16, 1945
Starring Larry Haines, Anne Shepherd (same show title as 1947-10-27, 1952-09-14 episodes)
242	34	"The Corridor of Doom"	Exists	mp3	October 23, 1945
Starring Boris Karloff
243	35	"The Man Who Couldn't Die" "Elixer Number 4"	Exists	mp3	October 30, 1945
Starring Boris Karloff (same show title as 1946-02-12 episode)
244	36	"The Wailing Wall"	Exists	mp3	November 6, 1945
Starring Boris Karloff, Jackson Beck
245	37	"The Dreadful Hunch"	Lost	-	November 13, 1945
Starring Richard Widmark
246	38	"Boomerang"	Exists	TBA	November 20, 1945
Starring Martin Gabel
247	39	"Death Can Be Beautiful"	Lost	-	November 27, 1945
Starring Karl Swenson
248	40	"A Puppet For Murder"	Lost	-	December 4, 1945
Starring Larry Haines
249	41	"The Dark Chamber"	Exists	mp3	December 11, 1945
Starring Kenneth Lynch
250	42	"The Undead"	Exists	mp3	December 18, 1945
Starring Anne Seymour
251	43	"The Littlest Angel"	Lost	-	December 25, 1945
Starring Helen Hayes

=== Season 6: 1946 ===
No. overall	No. in season	Title	Status	Listen	Original release date
252	1	"Phantom Music Box"	Lost	-	January 1, 1946
Starring Santos Ortega (same show title as 1951-01-01 episode)
253	2	"The Creeping Wall"	Exists	mp3	January 8, 1946
Starring Irene Wicker
254	3	"The Edge of Death"	Exists	mp3	January 15, 1946
Starring Larry Haines
255	4	"The Confession" "Catherine Bryan"	Exists	mp3	January 22, 1946
Starring Santos Ortega
256	5	"Blood of Cain"	Exists	mp3	January 29, 1946
Starring Mercedes McCambridge
257	6	"Skeleton Bay"	Exists	mp3	February 5, 1946
Starring Betty Lou Gerson (same show title as 1950-01-30 episode)
258	7	"The Man Who Couldn't Die" "Elixer Number 4"	Exists	mp3	February 12, 1946
Starring Richard Widmark (same show title as 1945-10-30 episode)
259	8	"You'll Never Escape"	Lost	-	February 19, 1946
Starring Kenny Lynch
260	9	"I Walk in the Night"	Exists	mp3	February 26, 1946
Starring Larry Haines
261	10	"Accident"	Lost	-	March 5, 1946
Starring Charlotte Holland
262	11	"Strands of Death"	Exists	mp3	March 12, 1946
Starring Santos Ortega
263	12	"Murders in the Morgue"	Lost	-	March 19, 1946
Starring Victor Moore
264	13	"Death Is a Double-Crosser"	Exists	mp3	March 26, 1946
Starring Lawson Zerbe
265	14	"The Night Is My Shroud"	Exists	TBA	April 2, 1946
Starring Ann Shepherd
266	15	"Lady with a Plan"	Exists	mp3	April 9, 1946
Starring Elspeth Eric
267	16	"The Lonely Hearts Killer"	Lost	-	April 16, 1946
Starring Orson Welles
268	17	"Make Ready My Grave"	Exists	mp3	April 23, 1946
Starring Joan Banks, Richard Widmark
269	18	"Dead Man's Turn"	Lost	-	April 30, 1946
Starring Larry Haines
270	19	"You Could Die Laughing"	Exists	mp3	May 7, 1946
Starring Santos Ortega
271	20	"Screams in the Night"	Lost	-	May 14, 1946
Starring Anne Shepherd (same show title as 1943-02-21 episode)
272	21	"Detour to Terror" "Death"	Exists	mp3	May 21, 1946
Starring Mason Adams
273	22	"Murder in the Night"	Lost	-	May 28, 1946
Starring Santos Ortega
274	23	"Eight Steps to Murder"	Exists	mp3	June 4, 1946
Starring Berry Kroeger
275	24	"Bury Me Not"	Lost	-	June 11, 1946
Starring Mercedes McCambridge
276	25	"I Want to Report a Murder"	Exists	mp3	June 18, 1946
Starring Santos Ortega
277	26	"One More Murder"	Lost	-	July 29, 1946
Starring Larry Haines
278	27	"Asleep in the Deep"	Lost	-	August 5, 1946
Starring Mercedes McCambridge
279	28	"Preview for Murder"	Lost	-	August 12, 1946
Starring Lawson Zerbe
280	29	"Spectre of the Rose"	Exists	mp3	August 19, 1946
Starring Ben Hecht
281	30	"The Long Wait Is Over"	Lost	-	August 26, 1946
Starring Joseph Julian
282	31	"The Missing Claw"	Lost	-	September 2, 1946
Starring Leslie Woods
283	32	"Murder Comes at Midnight"	Exists	mp3	September 9, 1946
Starring Mercedes McCambridge
284	33	"Murder to a Metronome"	Lost	-	September 16, 1946
Starring Anne Shepherd
285	34	"The Dead Laugh" "Ghosts Always Get the Last Laugh"	Exists	mp3	September 23, 1946
Starring Mercedes McCambridge, Santos Ortega
286	35	"Death Rides a Dollar Bill"	Lost	-	September 30, 1946
Starring Larry Haines
287	36	"The Listener" "Aunt Ellen"	Exists	mp3	October 7, 1946
Starring Freddie Bartholomew (same show title as 1952-07-20 episode)
288	37	"Strange Passenger"	Lost	-	October 14, 1946
Starring Mason Adams (same show title as 1949-05-23, 1952-08-31 episodes)
289	38	"The Black Dog"	Lost	-	October 21, 1946
Starring Leslie Woods
290	39	"The Sister"	Lost	-	October 28, 1946
Starring Anne Shepherd
291	40	"Death's Old Sweet Song"	Exists	mp3	November 4, 1946
Starring Mercedes McCambridge
292	41	"Nightmare"	Lost	-	November 11, 1946
Starring Les Tremayne (same show title as 1947-07-07 episode)
293	42	"Highway to Death"	Lost	-	November 18, 1946
Starring Larry Haines
294	43	"No Rest for the Dead"	Exists	mp3	November 25, 1946
Starring Anne Seymour (same show title as 1952-08-24 episode)
295	44	"But the Dead Walk Alone"	Lost	-	December 2, 1946
Starring Mercedes McCambridge
296	45	"Invisible Demon"	Lost	-	December 9, 1946
Starring Joseph Julian
297	46	"Whistle While I Die"	Lost	-	December 16, 1946
Starring Les Tremayne
298	47	"The Lonely Room"	Lost	-	December 23, 1946
Starring Mason Adams
299	48	"The Open Grave"	Lost	-	December 30, 1946
Starring Leslie Woods

=== Season 7: 1947 ===
No. overall	No. in season	Title	Status	Listen	Original release date
300	1	"Death Pays the Freight"	Exists	mp3	January 6, 1947
Starring Larry Haines (same show title as 1952-07-06, 1952-10-05 episodes)
301	2	"Payable at Death"	Lost	-	January 13, 1947
Starring Lawson Zerbe
302	3	"Witch Man"	Lost	-	January 20, 1947
Starring Berry Kroeger
303	4	"The Silent Hand"	Lost	-	January 27, 1947
Starring Stefan Schnabel
304	5	"Death Bound"	Exists	mp3	February 3, 1947
Starring Richard Widmark
305	6	"The Ghost in the Garden"	Exists	mp3	February 10, 1947
Starring Leslie Woods
306	7	"Moonlight Is for Murder"	Lost	-	February 17, 1947
Starring Larry Haines
307	8	"Journey into Death"	Lost	-	February 24, 1947
Starring Karl Swenson
308	9	"The Corpse That Nobody Loved"	Exists	mp3	March 3, 1947
Starring Wendy Barrie
309	10	"The Deadly Kiss"	Lost	-	March 10, 1947
Starring Richard Widmark
310	11	"Bury Me Deep"	Lost	-	March 17, 1947
Starring Charlotte Holland
311	12	"Black Is for Death"	Lost	-	March 24, 1947
Starring Everette Sloane
312	13	"Ghost of Jeremiah"	Lost	-	March 31, 1947
Starring Berry Kroeger
313	14	"The Girl Who Wouldn't Die"	Lost	-	April 7, 1947
Starring Mason Adams
314	15	"Death Is My Brother"	Lost	-	April 14, 1947
Starring Larry Haines
315	16	"Hour of Darkness"	Lost	-	April 21, 1947
Starring Karl Swenson
316	17	"The Case Of The Living Corpse"	Lost	-	April 28, 1947
Starring Anne Shepherd
317	18	"Don't Dance on My Grave"	Exists	mp3	May 5, 1947
Starring Charlotte Holland, Arnold Moss
318	19	"Dead Man Tells a Tale"	Lost	-	May 12, 1947
Starring Arlene Blackburn
319	20	"Terror by Night"	Exists	mp3	May 19, 1947
Starring Anne Shepherd (same show title as 1945-09-18, 1952-06-29 episodes)
320	21	"Never to Die Again"	Lost	-	May 26, 1947
Starring Everette Sloane
321	22	"The Fear of Death"	Lost	-	June 2, 1947
Starring Richard Widmark
322	23	"The Rest of My Natural Life"	Lost	-	June 9, 1947
Starring Charlotte Holland
323	24	"The Man on the Slab"	Lost	-	June 16, 1947
Starring Arnold Moss
324	25	"Over My Dead Body"	Exists	mp3	June 23, 1947
Starring Larry Haines, Vera Ellen
325	26	"Man and the Knife"	Exists	mp3	June 30, 1947
Starring Les Tremayne
326	27	"Nightmare"	Lost	-	July 7, 1947
Starring Elspeth Eric (same show title as 1946-11-11 episode)
327	28	"I Must Not Die Alone"	Lost	-	July 14, 1947
Starring Everette Sloane
328	29	"Death Accentuates the Negative"	Lost	-	July 21, 1947
Starring Anne Shephard
329	30	"Murderer at Large"	Lost	-	July 28, 1947
Starring Joseph Julian
330	31	"The White Witch"	Lost	-	August 4, 1947
Starring Elspeth Eric
331	32	"Night of Death"	Lost	-	August 11, 1947
Starring Richard Widmark
332	33	"Adventure in the Macabre"	Lost	-	August 18, 1947
Starring Larry Haines
333	34	"The Body in the Closet"	Lost	-	August 25, 1947
Starring Karl Swenson
334	35	"Last Time I Killed Her"	Lost	-	September 1, 1947
Starring Arnold Moss
335	36	"The Deadly Ring"	Lost	-	September 8, 1947
Starring Richard Widmark (same show title as 1944-10-14 episode)
336	37	"Till the Day I Kill You"	Lost	-	September 15, 1947
337	38	"As Long as I Live"	Lost	-	September 22, 1947
Starring Santos Ortega
338	39	"The Hands of Death"	Lost	-	September 29, 1947
Starring Myron McCormick (same show title as 1941-08-31 episode)
339	40	"A Time to Die"	Lost	-	October 6, 1947
Starring Mercedes McCambridge
340	41	"The Last Tour"	Lost	-	October 13, 1947
Starring Charles Irving
341	42	"The Mind Reader"	Lost	-	October 20, 1947
Starring Charlotte Holland (same show title as 1944-06-17 episode)
342	43	"Till Death Do Us Part"	Exists	mp3	October 27, 1947
Starring Everett Sloane, Mercedes McCambridge (same show title as 1945-10-16, 1952-09-14 episodes)
343	44	"Carnival of Death"	Lost	-	November 3, 1947
Starring Santos Ortega
344	45	"The Murderer Would Not Die"	Lost	-	November 10, 1947
Starring Karl Swenson
345	46	"The Conquest of Death"	Lost	-	November 17, 1947
Starring Larry Haines
346	47	"Tell It to the Dead"	Lost	-	November 24, 1947
Starring Everette Sloane
347	48	"Bernice"	Lost	-	December 1, 1947
Starring Karl Swenson
348	49	"Blood on the Roses"	Lost	-	December 8, 1947
Starring Mason Adams
349	50	"Death Plays the Black Keys"	Lost	-	December 15, 1947
Starring Everette Sloane
350	51	"Madame Midnight"	Lost	-	December 22, 1947
Starring Joseph Julian
351	52	"Death out of Mind"	Exists	mp3	December 29, 1947
Starring Larry Haines, Anne Shepherd

=== Season 8: 1948 ===
No. overall	No. in season	Title	Status	Listen	Original release date
352	1	"The Flaming Corpse"	Lost	-	January 5, 1948
Starring Everett Sloane
353	2	"Tempo in Blood"	Exists	mp3	January 12, 1948
Starring Mason Adams, Everett Sloane
354	3	"Murder Counts to Four"	Lost	-	January 19, 1948
Starring Ted Osbourne
355	4	"The Doomed"	Exists	mp3	January 26, 1948
Starring Karl Swenson, Mercedes McCambridge
356	5	"Death Trap"	Lost	-	February 2, 1948
Starring Evelyn Varden (same show title as 1948-06-21 episode)
357	6	"The Mislaid Corpse"	Lost	-	February 9, 1948
Starring Everette Sloane
358	7	"The Black Art"	Exists	mp3	February 16, 1948
Starring Ted Osborne (same show title as 1945-05-15 episode)
359	8	"Death Takes a Lonely Road"	Lost	-	February 23, 1948
Starring Mason Adams
360	9	"Dream Another Grave"	Lost	-	March 1, 1948
Starring Ted Osborne
361	10	"The Magic Tile"	Exists	mp3	March 8, 1948
Starring Mercedes McCambridge, Everett Sloane (same show title as 1952-08-10 episode)
362	11	"Ring Around the Morgue"	Lost	-	March 15, 1948
Starring Larry Haines
363	12	"Kill Me Tonight"	Lost	-	March 22, 1948
Starring Anne Shepherd
364	13	"Lady Killer" "Homicidal Maniac"	Exists	mp3	March 29, 1948
Starring Everette Sloane
365	14	"Murder Is My Destiny"	Lost	-	April 5, 1948
Starring Karl Swenson
366	15	"Vampire"	Lost	-	April 12, 1948
Starring Arnold Moss
367	16	"Death Paints Its Face"	Lost	-	April 19, 1948
Starring Arnold Moss
368	17	"Doorway to Death"	Lost	-	April 26, 1948
Starring Joseph Julian
369	18	"Murder on My Mind"	Lost	-	May 3, 1948
Starring Larry Haines
370	19	"The Murder Mirror"	Lost	-	May 10, 1948
Starring Karl Swenson
371	20	"A Touch of Death"	Exists	TBA	May 17, 1948
Starring Anne Shepherd
372	21	"Murder Wears Polka Dots"	Lost	-	May 24, 1948
Starring Everett Sloane
373	22	"The Murdered Never Die"	Lost	-	May 31, 1948
Starring Joseph Julian
374	23	"The Kane Curse"	Lost	-	June 7, 1948
Starring Mason Adams
375	24	"Mark of Murder"	Lost	-	June 14, 1948
Starring Karl Swenson
376	25	"Death Trap"	Lost	-	June 21, 1948
Starring Evelyn Varden (same show title as 1948-02-02 episode)
377	26	"The Corpse Laughs Last"	Exists	mp3	June 28, 1948
Starring Mason Adams (same show title as 1952-08-17 episode)
378	27	"Death Demon"	Exists	mp3	July 5, 1948
Starring Everett Sloane, Anne Seymour (same show title as 1949-02-07 episode)
379	28	"Death Is a Magician"	Lost	-	July 12, 1948
Starring Larry Haines
380	29	"The Eyes of My Murderer"	Exists	TBA	July 19, 1948
Starring Donald Buka
381	30	"Murder Takes a Honeymoon"	Exists	mp3	July 26, 1948
Starring Everett Sloan, Ann Sheperd
382	31	"The Murder Ship" "Ship of Doom"	Exists	mp3	August 2, 1948
Starring Mason Adams
383	32	"House of Doom"	Exists	mp3	August 9, 1948
Starring Santos Ortega, Charlotte Holland, Anne Seymour, Myron McCormick
384	33	"Paint My Coffin Black"	Lost	-	August 16, 1948
Starring Lawson Zerbe
385	34	"Only the Dead Will Know"	Lost	-	August 23, 1948
Starring Charlotte Holland, Sam Wanamaker
386	35	"Next Time I Live"	Exists	TBA	August 30, 1948
Starring Anne Seymour, Mason Adams
387	36	"Death Rides a Riptide"	Exists	mp3	September 6, 1948
Starring Arlene Blackburn, Lawson Zerbe
388	37	"The Murder Carousel" "Death Rides a Carousel"	Exists	TBA	September 13, 1948
Starring Leslie Woods, Lawson Zerbe
389	38	"Hangman's Island"	Exists	mp3	September 20, 1948
Starring Mason Adams, Elspeth Eric
390	39	"Murder by Prophecy" "Highgate / Lion Reigns at Hillcrest / The Three Steps"	Exists	mp3	September 27, 1948
Starring Lawson Zerbe, Santos Ortega, Joseph Julian
391	40	"Death in the Universe"	Lost	-	October 11, 1948
Starring Lawson Zerbe
392	41	"Death of a Doll"	Exists	mp3	October 18, 1948
Starring Mason Adams, Ted Osborne
393	42	"The Phantom Dancer"	Lost	-	October 25, 1948
Starring Mercedes McCambridge
394	43	"Flight from Fear"	Lost	-	November 1, 1948
Starring Elspeth Eric
395	44	"Front Page Murder"	Lost	-	November 8, 1948
Starring Myron McCormick
396	45	"Death Watch in Boston"	Exists	mp3	November 15, 1948
Starring Mason Adams, Ted Osborne
397	46	"Monkey Called Death"	Lost	-	November 22, 1948
Starring Larry Haines
398	47	"Murder for Keeps"	Lost	-	November 29, 1948
Starring Arnold Moss
399	48	"Cause of Death"	Exists	mp3	December 6, 1948
Starring Santos Ortega, Berry Kroeger
400	49	"Murder Faces East"	Exists	mp3	December 13, 1948
Starring Karl Swenson, Charlotte Holland
401	50	"Between Two Worlds"	Exists	mp3	December 20, 1948
Starring Mason Adams, Ann Shepherd
402	51	"The Painted Corpse"	Lost	-	December 27, 1948
Starring Larry Haines

=== Season 9: 1949 ===
No. overall	No. in season	Title	Status	Listen	Original release date
403	1	"Fearful Voyage"	Exists	mp3	January 3, 1949
Starring Arnold Moss, Elspeth Eric
404	2	"Murder Comes to Life"	Exists	mp3	January 10, 1949
Starring Charles Irving, Santos Ortega
405	3	"Mark My Grave"	Exists	mp3	January 17, 1949
Starring Lawson Zerbe, Santos Ortega
406	4	"The Deadly Dummy"	Exists	mp3	January 24, 1949
Starring Mason Adams, Elspeth Eric
407	5	"The Devil's Fortune" "El Fortuna Diablo"	Exists	mp3	January 31, 1949
Starring Karl Swenson, Charles Irving, Jackson Beck
408	6	"Death Demon"	Exists	mp3	February 7, 1949
Starring Leslie Woods, Everett Sloane (same show title as 1948-07-05 episode)
409	7	"Birdsong for a Murderer"	Exists	mp3	February 14, 1949
Starring Ted Osborne, Arlene Blackburn (same show title as 1952-06-22 episode)
410	8	"Flame of Death"	Exists	mp3	February 21, 1949
Starring Charlotte Holland, Les Treymane
411	9	"Roses Are Red"	Lost	-	February 28, 1949
Starring Larry Haines
412	10	"Murder by Coincidence"	Lost	-	March 7, 1949
Starring Everett Sloane
413	11	"Death and the Detective"	Lost	-	March 14, 1949
Starring Charles Irving
414	12	"Only the Dead Die Twice"	Exists	mp3	March 21, 1949
Starring Larry Haines, Alice Reinheart
415	13	"Appointment with Death" "Florida Keys"	Exists	mp3	March 28, 1949
Starring Charlotte Holland, Karl Swenson
416	14	"Death Wears a Lonely Smile"	Exists	mp3	April 4, 1949
Starring Everett Sloane, Mercedes McCambridge
417	15	"Murder off the Record"	Exists	mp3	April 11, 1949
Starring Mason Adams, Elspeth Eric (same show title as 1952-08-03 episode)
418	16	"The Death Deal"	Exists	mp3	April 18, 1949
Starring Arnold Moss, Mercedes McCambridge, Everett Sloane
419	17	"Death Is the Winner"	Lost	-	April 25, 1949
Starring Larry Haines
420	18	"The Deadly Double"	Lost	-	May 2, 1949
Starring Karl Swenson
421	19	"Corpse on the Town"	Exists	mp3	May 9, 1949
Starring Charles Irving
422	20	"The Unburied Dead"	Exists	mp3	May 16, 1949
Starring Leslie Woods, Everett Sloane
423	21	"Strange Passenger"	Exists	mp3	May 23, 1949
Starring Mason Adams (same show title as 1946-10-14, 1952-08-31 episodes)
424	22	"The Corpse Is Lonely"	Lost	-	May 30, 1949
Starring Larry Haines
425	23	"Death on the Highway"	Exists	mp3	June 6, 1949
Starring Ted Osborne, Alice Rhinehart
426	24	"Curious Corpse"	Lost	-	June 13, 1949
Starring Mercedes McCambridge
427	25	"Corpse Without a Conscience"	Exists	mp3	June 20, 1949
Starring Everett Sloane, Karl Swenson
428	26	"Model for a Murder"	Lost	-	June 27, 1949
Starring Arnold Moss
429	27	"Pattern for Fear"	Exists	mp3	July 4, 1949
Starring Everett Sloane, Cameron Prud'Homme
430	28	"Death Song"	Lost	-	July 11, 1949
Starring Mason Adams
431	29	"Deadly Fare"	Exists	mp3	July 18, 1949
Starring Larry Haines, Everett Sloane
432	30	"Murder Wears a Straw Hat"	Lost	-	July 25, 1949
Starring Mason Adams
433	31	"Dead Level"	Lost	-	August 1, 1949
Starring Berry Kroeger
434	32	"Death Takes First Place"	Lost	-	August 8, 1949
Starring Joseph Julian
435	33	"Dead Heat"	Exists	mp3	August 15, 1949
Starring Mercedes McCambridge, Karl Swenson
436	34	"Mind over Murder"	Exists	mp3	August 22, 1949
Starring Everett Sloane, Elspeth Eric
437	35	"Death's Little Brother"	Exists	mp3	August 29, 1949
Starring Larry Haines, Amzie Strickland
438	36	"Murder Rides the Carousel"	Exists	mp3	September 5, 1949
Starring Leslie Woods, Lawson Zerbe
439	37	"The Vengeful Corpse"	Exists	mp3	September 12, 1949
Starring Karl Swenson, Barbara Weeks
440	38	"Honeymoon with Death"	Exists	mp3	September 19, 1949
Starring Arlene Blackburn, Mason Adams
441	39	"Strike up the Band"	Lost	-	September 26, 1949
Starring Berry Kroeger
442	40	"Catch a Killer"	Exists	mp3	October 3, 1949
Starring Larry Haines, Barbara Weeks
443	41	"The Devil's Workshop"	Exists	mp3	October 10, 1949
Starring Mason Adams, Joan Banks
444	42	"Image of Death"	Exists	mp3	October 17, 1949
Starring Berry Kroeger, Jean Ellen
445	43	"Night Is My Shroud"	Exists	mp3	October 24, 1949
Starring Kenneth Lynch, Ann Shepherd
446	44	"Corpse for Halloween"	Exists	mp3	October 31, 1949
Starring Larry Haines, Mercedes McCambridge, Berry Kroeger
447	45	"Make Deep My Grave"	Lost	-	November 7, 1949
Starring Martin Gabel
448	46	"Wish to Kill"	Exists	mp3	November 14, 1949
Starring Karl Swenson, Leslie Woods
449	47	"Time to Die"	Lost	-	November 21, 1949
Starring Lawson Zerbe
450	48	"The Illusion of Murder"	Lost	-	November 28, 1949
Starring Mason Adams
451	49	"Wake up and Die"	Lost	-	December 5, 1949
Starring Larry Haines
452	50	"Touch of Death"	Lost	-	December 12, 1949
Starring Charlotte Holland
453	51	"Beyond the Grave" "Terror Out of the Fog"	Exists	mp3	December 19, 1949
Starring Martin gabel (same show title as 1950-12-04 episode)
454	52	"The Enchanted Ghost"	Exists	mp3	December 26, 1949
Starring Frank Sinatra

=== Season 10: 1950 ===
No. overall	No. in season	Title	Status	Listen	Original release date
455	1	"Blood Relative"	Lost	-	January 2, 1950
Starring Charlotte Holland
456	2	"Killer at Large"	Exists	mp3	January 9, 1950
Starring Larry Haines
457	3	"The Scream"	Exists	mp3	January 16, 1950
Starring Barbara Weeks
458	4	"Hitch-Hiking Corpse"	Exists	mp3	January 23, 1950
Starring Kenneth Lynch
459	5	"Skeleton Bay"	Exists	mp3	January 30, 1950
Starring Charlotte Holland (same show title as 1946-02-05 episode)
460	6	"The Deadly Face"	Exists	TBA	February 6, 1950
Starring Arnold Moss
461	7	"Not Quite Dead"	Exists	TBA	February 13, 1950
Starring Everett Sloane
462	8	"The Obituary"	Exists	TBA	February 20, 1950
Starring Mason Adams
463	9	"The Death Grip"	Lost	-	February 27, 1950
Starring Martin Gabel
464	10	"The Haunted"	Exists	TBA	March 6, 1950
Starring Arnold Moss
465	11	"Diamonds for a Corpse"	Lost	-	March 13, 1950
Starring Larry Haines
466	12	"Corpse in the Parlor"	Exists	mp3	March 20, 1950
Starring Ken Lynch
467	13	"Murder Mansion"	Exists	mp3	March 27, 1950
Starring Arnold Moss, Everett Sloane
468	14	"The Touch of Terror"	Lost	-	April 3, 1950
Starring Charlotte Holland
469	15	"Cry of Death"	Exists	TBA	April 10, 1950
Starring Berry Kroeger
470	16	"Beneficiary – Death"	Exists	mp3	April 17, 1950
Starring Barbara Weeks, Everett Sloane
471	17	"The Corpse Said No"	Lost	-	September 4, 1950
Starring Larry Haines
472	18	"Death Watch"	Lost	-	September 11, 1950
Starring Robert Sloane (same show title as 1951-06-11 episode)
473	19	"Dead Man's Holiday"	Exists	mp3	September 18, 1950
Starring Peter Cappel (same show title as 1945-06-19 episode)
474	20	"The Dead Are Never Lonely"	Lost	-	September 25, 1950
Starring Mason Adams
475	21	"Cry Ghosts"	Lost	-	October 2, 1950
Starring Ken Lynch
476	22	"Death Wish"	Lost	-	October 9, 1950
Starring Peter Cappel
477	23	"The Hangman"	Lost	-	October 16, 1950
Starring Santos Ortega
478	24	"The Empty Grave"	Lost	-	October 23, 1950
Starring Ralph Bell
479	25	"Twice Dead"	Exists	mp3	November 6, 1950
Starring Larry Haines, Amzie Strickland
480	26	"Skeleton in the Sun"	Lost	-	November 13, 1950
Starring Ken Lynch
481	27	"No Escape"	Lost	-	November 20, 1950
Starring Charlotte Holland
482	28	"One Coffin Too Many"	Lost	-	November 27, 1950
Starring Ralph Bell
483	29	"Beyond the Grave"	Exists	mp3	December 4, 1950
Starring Mason Adams, Lester Coppel, Mercedes McCambridge (same show title as 1949-12-19 episode)
484	30	"Two in the Grave"	Lost	-	December 11, 1950
Starring Karl Swenson
485	31	"Murder by Consent"	Lost	-	December 18, 1950
Starring Ken Lynch
486	32	"Enchanted Ghost"	Lost	-	December 25, 1950
Starring Larry Haines

=== Season 11: 1951 ===
No. overall	No. in season	Title	Status	Listen	Original release date
487	1	"Phantom Music Box"	Lost	-	January 1, 1951
(same show title as 1946-01-01 episode)
488	2	"Terror in the Night"	Lost	-	January 8, 1951
Starring Ralph Bell
489	3	"The Sound of Death"	Lost	-	January 15, 1951
Starring Peter Cappel
490	4	"Lonesome Corpse"	Lost	-	January 22, 1951
Starring Ken Lynch
491	5	"Finger of Death"	Lost	-	January 29, 1951
Starring Larry Haines
492	6	"Snow-White Scarf"	Exists	mp3	February 5, 1951
Starring Mason Adams
493	7	"Fear of Night"	Lost	-	February 12, 1951
Starring Everett Sloane
494	8	"The Smile of the Dead"	Exists	mp3	February 19, 1951
Starring Larry Haines
495	9	"Man In the Grave"	Exists	mp3	February 26, 1951
Starring Ralph Bell, Peter Cappel
496	10	"Death Proposal"	Exists	TBA	March 5, 1951
Starring Charlotte Holland
497	11	"Live a Little, Die a Little"	Lost	-	March 12, 1951
Starring Everett Sloane
498	12	"Skeleton in a Trunk"	Lost	-	March 19, 1951
Starring Lawson Zerbe
499	13	"The Unseen"	Lost	-	March 26, 1951
Starring Mandel Kramer
500	14	"The Deadly Purse"	Lost	-	April 2, 1951
Starring Arnold Moss
501	15	"Time to Kill"	Lost	-	April 9, 1951
Starring Ralph Bell
502	16	"??"	Lost	-	April 16, 1951
Starring Larry Haines
503	17	"A Corpse To Remember"	Lost	-	April 23, 1951
Starring Ken Lynch, Barbara Weeks
504	18	"Murder Bait"	Lost	-	April 30, 1951
Starring Barbara Weeks, Charlotte Holland
505	19	"Death Is a Right Hook"	Lost	-	May 7, 1951
Starring Larry Haines
506	20	"Death Takes A Lonely Road"	Lost	-	May 14, 1951
Starring Mason Adams, Ralph Bell
507	21	"The Space Ghost"	Lost	-	May 21, 1951
Starring Arnold Moss
508	22	"The Unforgiving Corpse"	Exists	mp3	May 28, 1951
Starring Luis van Rooten, Lawson Zerbe
509	23	"A Corpse There Was"	Exists	mp3	June 4, 1951
Starring Charlotte Holland, Larry Haines
510	24	"Death Watch"	Lost	-	June 11, 1951
Starring Barbara Weeks, Larry Haines (same show title as 1950-09-11 episode)
511	25	"Ghost in the Garden"	Lost	-	June 18, 1951
Starring Lesley Woods

=== Season 12: 1952 ===
Many of the shows in season 12 reused previous stories. Some used exactly the same scripts while others used slightly modified scripts. Most of these were recorded using one or more different voice actors than were in the original stories. Because of these differences, they are not technically re-runs, though they are often referred to that way.

No. overall	No. in season	Title	Status	Listen	Original release date
512	1	"Birdsong for a Murderer"	Exists	mp3	June 22, 1952
Starring Boris Karloff (same show title as 1949-02-14 episode)
513	2	"Terror by Night"	Exists	mp3	June 29, 1952
Starring Agnes Moorehead (same show title as 1945-09-18, 1947-05-19 episodes)
514	3	"Death Pays the Freight"	Exists	mp3	July 6, 1952
Starring Everett Sloane (same show title as 1947-01-06, 1952-10-05 episodes)
515	4	"Death for Sale"	Exists	mp3	July 13, 1952
Starring Boris Karloff
516	5	"The Listener" "Aunt Ellen"	Exists	mp3	July 20, 1952
Starring Agnes Moorehead, Paul McGrath (same show title as 1946-10-07 episode)
517	6	"The Murder Prophet" "Cemetery Hitch-hiker / Claudia / The Last Refrain"	Exists	mp3	July 27, 1952
Starring Agnes Moorehead (same show title as 1945-09-04 episode)
518	7	"Murder off the Record"	Exists	mp3	August 3, 1952
Starring Kenneth Lynch (same show title as 1949-04-11 episode)
519	8	"The Magic Tile"	Exists	mp3	August 10, 1952
Starring Anne Seymour (same show title as 1948-03-08 episode)
520	9	"The Corpse Laughs Last"	Exists	mp3	August 17, 1952
Starring Wendell Corey (same show title as 1948-06-28 episode)
521	10	"No Rest for the Dead"	Exists	mp3	August 24, 1952
Starring Barbara Weeks, Everette Sloane (same show title as 1946-11-25 episode)
522	11	"Strange Passenger" "The Corpse In The Taxi / Stardust"	Exists	mp3	August 31, 1952
Starring Wendell Corey (same show title as 1946-10-14, 1949-05-23 episodes)
523	12	"The Meek Die Slowly" "Jane Carter / Undertaker"	Exists	mp3	September 7, 1952
Starring Arnold Moss (same show title as 1945-04-03 episode)
524	13	"Till Death Do Us Part"	Exists	mp3	September 14, 1952
Starring Mason Adams (same show title as 1945-10-16, 1947-10-27 episodes)
525	14	"The Corpse Nobody Loved" "Corpse in a Cab / Lady and the Corpse / Razor's Edge"	Exists	mp3	September 21, 1952
Starring Joan Lorring
526	15	"The Dead Walk at Night"	Exists	mp3	September 28, 1952
Starring Donald Buka (same show title as 1942-09-20 episode)
527	16	"Death Pays the Freight" "Switch"	Exists	mp3	October 5, 1952
Starring Everett Sloane (repeat of 7-06-52) (same show title as 1947-01-06, 1952-07-06 episode)

== See also ==
- Old-time radio
