= Doorway to Danger =

American spy TV series (1951–1953)

Doorway to Danger is an American television spy series that was broadcast on NBC as a summer replacement for The Big Story in 1951, 1952, and 1953. In 1951 it was called The Door With No Name.

== 1951 ==
Debuting on July 6, 1951, The Door With No Name featured Grant Richards as Doug Carter, an intelligence agent for the United States. Mel Ruick portrayed his boss, John Randolph. Westbrook Van Voorhis was the narrator. Charles Paul provided the music. A semi-documentary approach related stories about international espionage and intrigue, "based on secret activities of federal agencies". The show was broadcast on Fridays from 9 to 9:30 p.m. Eastern Time and ended on August 17, 1951. Topics of episodes included tracking down the source of opium that was being smuggled and thwarting a plan to crash a plane carrying Carter and three scientists.

The program's efforts to achieve realistic effects on the air injured three technicians in July 1951. While a worker sprinkled smoke powder and photographic flash powder on a hot plate to study smoke effects in preparation for an episode, a bottle of powder that he held in his hand exploded when a spark ignited it. The explosion burned and cut his hand, superficially punctured a second technician's hand, and inflicted a cut above the eye of a third man.

Tom Victor was the producer, and Walter Seldon was the director. The writers were Irve Tunick and Martha Wilkerson. The program originated from WNBT. The sponsor was Pall Mall cigarettes.

== 1952 ==
Renamed Doorway to Danger, the series returned on July 4, 1952, at 9:30 p.m. E. T. for an eight-week run with Roland Winters in the role of Randolph (also known as "The Chief"). Instead of focusing on activities of the same agent from week to week, each episode related a mission of a different agent. The first episode told about Hugh Wilson, a special agent who replaced a blind Czech man in a Russian mining operation. Wilson, who resembled the Czech man but could see, had to obtain data about the mines' output. Ernest Chappell narrated the series, and Dick Schneider was the director. Writers included Wilkerson. Pall Mall remained as the sponsor. It was broadcast live.

=== Critical response ===
The trade publication Variety said that the season's premiere episode "built suspense but was choppy in spots". The review complimented Steve Elliott's performance as the sighted agent who feigned blindness as he infliltrated the operation that otherwise had all blind workers.

== 1953 ==
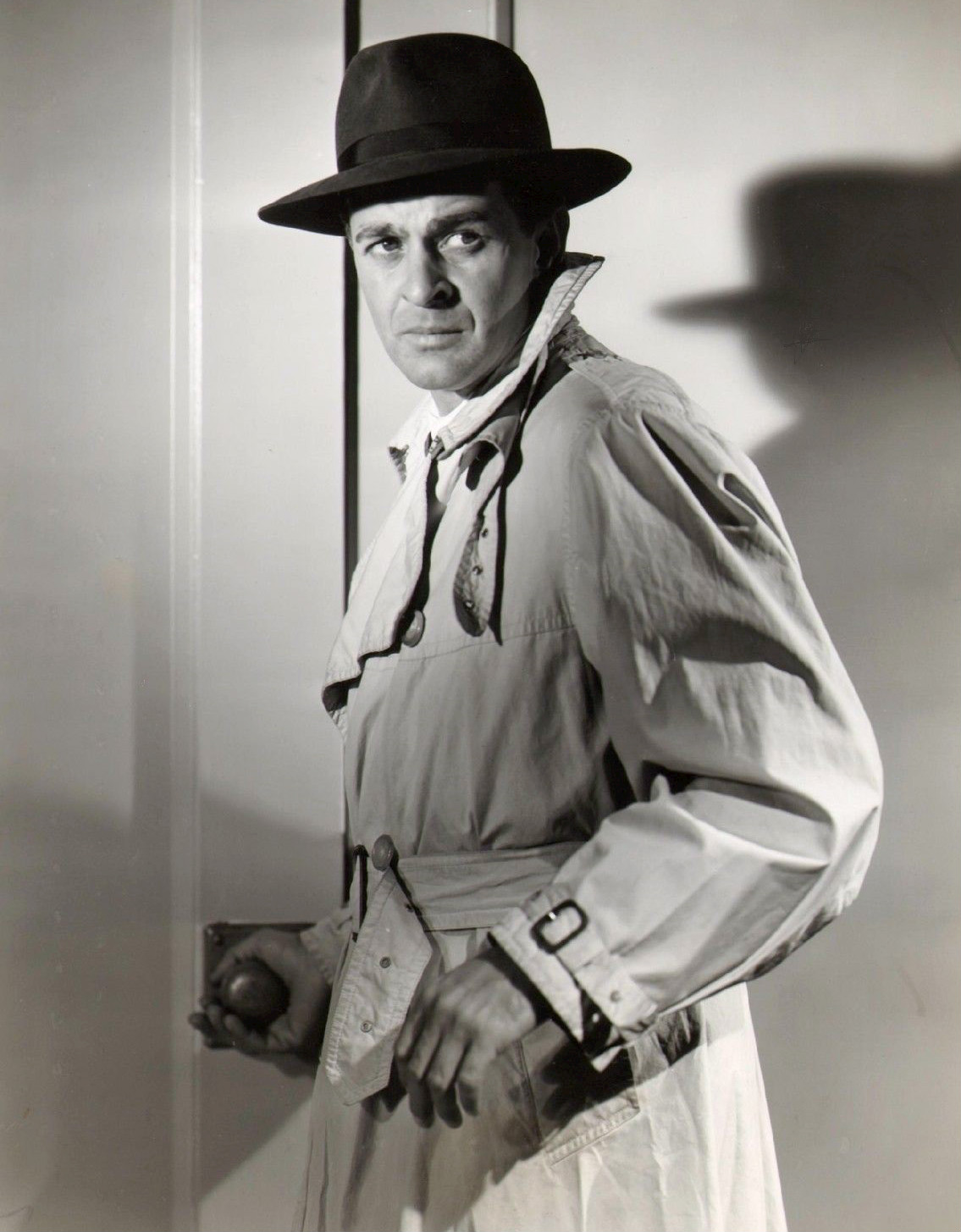
Stacy Harris as agent Doug Carter in Doorway to Danger

Agent Carter was back as the main character when Doorway to Danger returned for a run of July 3, 1952 - August 21, 1952 Stacy Harris portrayed Carter, with Raymond Bramley as Randolph. The announcers were Chappell, John Cannon, and Charles Martin. The directors were Schneider and Cort Steen. Writers included Wilkerson, Bob Shaw, ahd Harry W. Junkin. Pall Mall and Simoniz were the sponsors.

After its summer run on NBC, the program was moved to ABC-TV for a five-week series. Harris and Bramley continued in their roles, and Pall Mall was the sponsor. Jim Hayes was the producer; Fred Carr and Steen alternated weeks as directors. Wilkerson and Tunick were the writers, and Vladimir Selinsky was the musical director. It originated from WABC-TV. The five-episode run served to fill time between the cancellation of Chance of a Lifetime and the debut of Where's Raymond?, which Pall Mall sponsored.

=== Critical response ===
A review of this season's premiere episode in Variety said that Doorway to Danger "does nothing more than spin a half-hour adventure yarn" with script and acting "making no demands on [the] viewer". The review called the acting "routine ... credible, if not exciting" and said that despite cliche-ridden dialog the episode "moved fast and never became offensive".
