= City Hospital (American TV series) =

American TV medical drama (1951–1953)

- Melville Ruick as Dr. Barton Crane in City Hospital, 1953
- Genre: Medical drama
- Starring: Anne Burr; Melville Ruick
- Country of origin: United States
- Original language: English

Original release
- Network: ABC; CBS
- Release: March 25, 1952 – October 1, 1953

City Hospital is one of the first medical dramas on American television. It was broadcast from 1951 to 1953, first on ABC and later on CBS.

== Schedule ==
The ABC version began on November 3, 1951, and ended on April 19, 1952. It was broadcast on CBS from March 25, 1952, until October 1, 1953, creating a period of about three weeks when both networks carried the show. The ABC version was on alternate Saturdays. The CBS version was aired on Tuesday nights until June 1953, alternating with Crime Syndicated. Then, it moved to Thursday nights, alternating with Place the Face.

== Cast and premise ==
The show starred Anne Burr as Dr. Kate Morrow and Melville Ruick as Dr. Barton Crane. Set in a large metropolitan hospital, the show dealt with both the professional and the personal sides of doctors' lives. Crane was City Hospital's medical director, and episodes usually related to him directly or as he was advising other doctors. Having Morrow, a female doctor, "was rather uncommon for medical shows of this period."

John Cannon was the announcer.

== Production ==
Walter Selden was the producer, and Cort Steen was the director. Writers were Julian Funt and Robert Newman. Sponsors were Carter's Pills, Nair, Arrid, and Rise.
