= John Connell (actor) =

American actor (1923–2015)

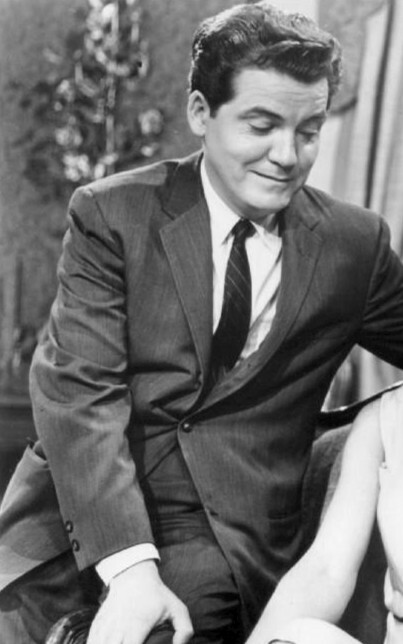
- Connell in Young Doctor Malone, 1962
- Born: John P. Connell; October 28, 1923; Philadelphia, Pennsylvania, U.S.
- Died: September 10, 2015 (aged 91); Los Angeles, California, U.S.
- Education: University of Missouri
- Occupation: Actor
- Spouse: Mila (m. 1952)
- Children: 2

John P. Connell (October 28, 1923 – September 10, 2015) was an American stage, television, film and voice actor. Born in Philadelphia, Connell served aboard a B-24 Liberator during World War II, for which he received a Purple Heart. He attended the University of Missouri School of Journalism upon his discharge from the Army Air Force and graduated in 1950.

Connell made his stage debut with the Henry Denker play Time Limit! and later acted in Uncle Willie. Television appearances included multiple anthology series, such as Studio One in Hollywood, Kraft Television Theatre, Goodyear Playhouse, and The Alcoa Hour, though he was best known for his role as Dr. David Malone in the soap operaYoung Doctor Malone. He also had a brief role as Lt. Dan Riley in the gothic soap opera Dark Shadows in 1967 and Connell also wrote storylines for the soap opera The Secret Storm.

He had small roles in such films as Fail Safe (1964), Three Days of the Condor (1975), and Family Business (1989). He began doing voiceovers for advertisements in the 1960s, and represented Maxwell House, American Airlines, Xerox, and Procter & Gamble, among others.

Connell was a member of SAG-AFTRA's National Board of Directors for thirteen years and also served as editor of Reel, the magazine published by the union. He was also the founder of Shakespearean acting troupe Come Hither Players. He married his wife Mila in 1952, with whom he had two children. Connell died in Woodland Hills, Los Angeles on September 10, 2015.
