= Alice Reinheart =

American actress

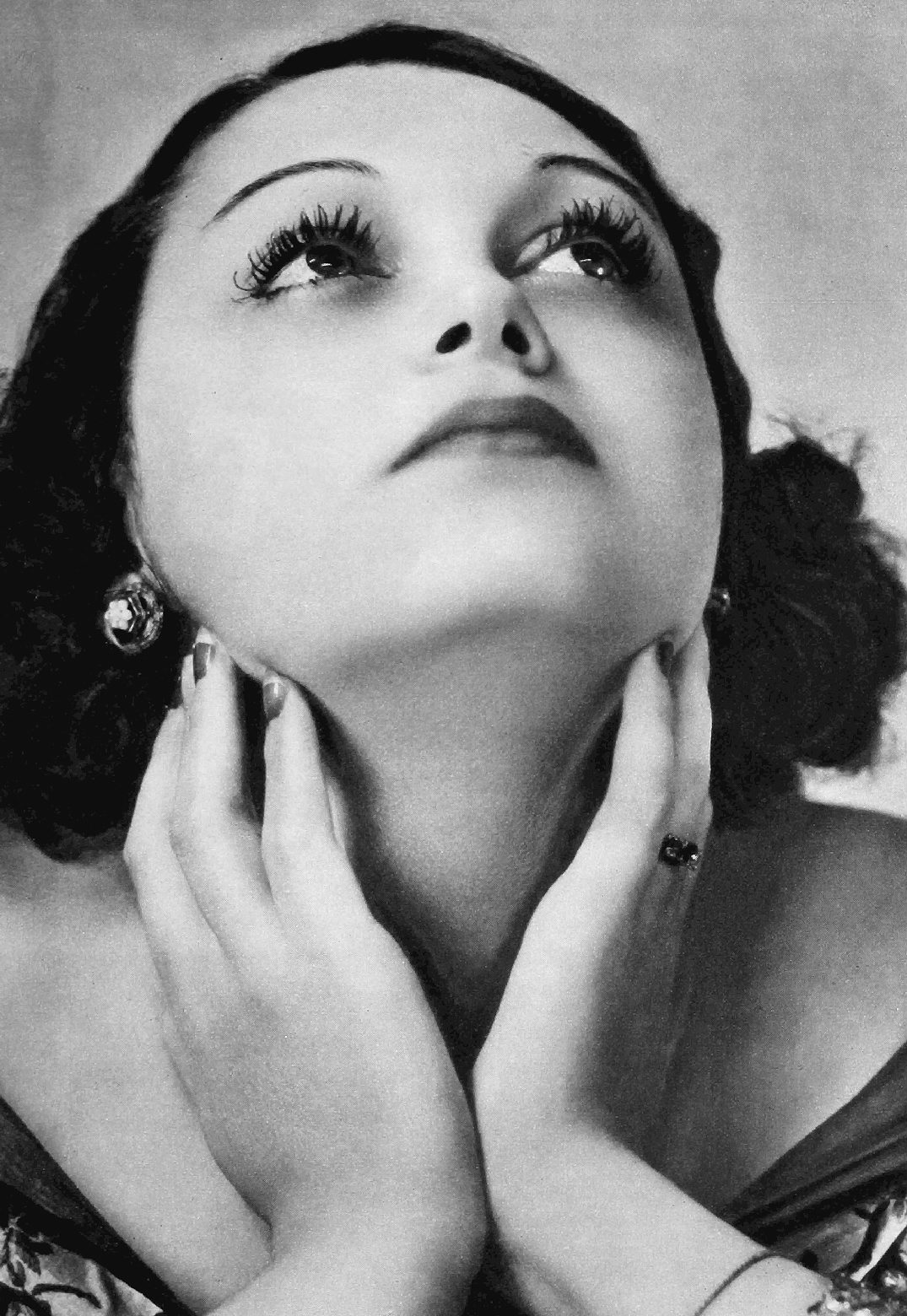
- Alice Reinheart in 1934
- Born: May 6, 1910; San Francisco, California, U.S.
- Died: June 10, 1993 (aged 83); Avon, Connecticut, U.S.
- Resting place: Riverside Cemetery, Farmington, Connecticut
- Education: University of California; University of Wisconsin; San Francisco Conservatory of Music
- Occupation: Actress
- Known for: The Lieutenant Wore Skirts
- Spouse(s): William Burke Miller (1938-?); Les Tremayne (1945-1962; divorced)

Alice Reinheart (May 6, 1910 – June 10, 1993) was an American actress, best known for her work in old-time radio. She also appeared on television. An article in the September 1940 issue of Radio and Television Mirror magazine described her as "pert, vivacious, beautiful and talented in writing and music as well as acting."

== Early years ==
Reinheart was born May 6, 1910 in San Francisco, California and grew up in Winnemucca, Nevada. She was called "a child prodigy, [who] gave piano concerts when she was 12." Reinheart "traveled extensively in Europe" before she was 16 years old. Later, she studied journalism at the University of Wisconsin, studied drama and languages at the University of California and studied piano at the San Francisco Conservatory of Music.

== Radio ==
Reinheart's debut on radio came in 1928 on KYA in San Francisco, California. She went on to appear in both soap operas and prime-time dramatic programs. A 1936 news brief reported, "She has appeared in as many as 12 programs in one week." She was perhaps best known for her role of Chichi in Life Can Be Beautiful (1938-1946).

Reinheart's other work on radio included roles in One Man's Family, The Woman in My House, Nona from Nowhere, Wendy Warren and the News, Young Doctor Malone, Treasury Agent, Front Page Farrell, Romance, Inc., Call the Police, Casey, Press Photographer, Her Honor, Nancy James, John's Other Wife, Gang Busters, Molle Mystery Theater (05/17/1946 episode "Killer Come Back to Me"), On Broadway, and The Court of Human Relations. She and her husband, Les Tremayne, had a morning talk show, The Tremaynes, in the late 1940s.

Reinheart's vocal talents for radio included her ability to scream in a way "fit to send cold shivers up and down the backs of the unseen audience, fit to make one's hair stand on end." A newspaper article reported, "Alice Reinheart has [a] vocal range of three and one-half octaves [and] can scream ten full notes above high C" and that she "can drive the studio control needle up to 60 decibels, which is tops for the measuring instrument."

One of Reinheart's radio roles led to a compliment from British royalty. After an episode of The March of Time had Reinheart portraying the Duchess of Windsor, Reinheart "subsequently was invited to a reception by the Duchess, who was pleased by the portrayal."

== Stage ==
Beginning when she was 15, Reinheart acted for two years in stock productions with the Players Guild in San Francisco. Her Broadway credits include Papavert (1931-1932), Foolscap (1933), The Mask and the Face (1933), The Drums Begin (1933), The Wooden Slipper (1934), Journey to Jerusalem (1940), and Leaf and Bough (1949).

== Film ==
During a trip abroad, Reinheart "made moving picture shorts in English, German, and French." A brief item in a 1932 issue of the trade publication Film Daily reported that she "appeared in several shorts and feature productions for Ufa while in Berlin." Her first appearance in an American film was in The Sky Hawk, produced at the Brooklyn Vitaphone studio (not to be confused with The Sky Hawk, produced in 1929 by Fox Film Corporation). Feature films in which she appeared included The Lieutenant Wore Skirts, Bachelor Flat, and The Iron Sheriff.

In 1941, Reinheart participated in a blend of stage and film. She was in the cast of Journey to Jerusalem, which was filmed and made available "throughout the land" for exhibition by "more than 25,000 owners and renters of 16 millimeter sound-equipped projectors" as part of a project called Theater-on-Film Inc.

== Television ==
Reinheart appeared in a number of television programs, including Dragnet, The Donna Reed Show, The Danny Thomas Show, Get Smart, I Dream of Jeannie, and Mission Impossible.

== Personal life ==
Reinheart was an avid reader, so much so that a 1940 magazine article said, "her own home is practically a library with living-quarters attached. She has a large collection of fine editions, and a four-volume scrapbook which she began in 1928, into which she copies in her own handwriting excerpts from the world's greatest literature."

On September 26, 1938, Reinheart married William Burke Miller, who had won a Pulitzer Prize when he was a newspaper reporter. They met when he was night manager at NBC. Her second marriage was to actor Les Tremayne on December 11, 1945. The union ended in divorce in 1962.

In the 1970s, Reinheart moved to Farmington, Connecticut. She was president of the Farmington Historical Society.

== Death ==
Reinheart died June 10, 1993, at the Brightview Convalescent Home in Avon, Connecticut. She had no survivors.
