= Confession (radio program) =

American old-time radio crime drama anthology series

- Genre: Crime drama anthology
- Running time: 30 minutes
- Country of origin: United States
- Language(s): English
- Syndicates: NBC
- Starring: Paul Frees
- Announcer: John Wald
- Written by: Lou Rusoff; Don Brinkley
- Directed by: Homer Canfield
- Produced by: Homer Canfield; Warren Lewis
- Original release: July 5 – September 13, 1953

Confession is an American old-time radio crime drama anthology series. It was broadcast on NBC from July 5, 1953, to September 13, 1953, as a summer replacement for Dragnet.

== Format ==
Confession dramatized material from files of corrections departments from across the United States. Radio historian John Dunning compared Confession to Dragnet, writing, "Confession had a texture and sound not unlike Dragnet; indeed, the Dragnet influence was evident throughout." Although both programs featured crimes taken from real life, he added, "Dragnet began with the crime while Confession unfolded in reverse order."

Each episode of the program began with the following dialog:

Criminal: I make this confession of my own free will because it is true. There wasn't any force or violence used upon my person to induce me to make these statements. Without promise of immunity or gratuity, I confess.

Announcer: You understand, of course, your statements will be made public to the radio program Confession?

Criminal: I do.

Announcer: You are listening to Confession. This confession is a matter of documented record. You will hear the story of this crime experience in the person's own words. This is Confession.

== Personnel ==
The only regular character on Confession was Richard A. McGee, director of the California State Department of Corrections. He was portrayed by Paul Frees. Other actors heard frequently in supporting roles were Parley Baer, Herb Butterfield, Don Diamond, Sam Edwards, Virginia Christine, Virginia Gregg, Stacy Harris, Jonathan Hole, Peter Leeds, Joyce McCluskey, Marvin Miller, Jack Moyles, and Barney Phillips. The real Richard McGee appeared midway through each program to remind listeners, "Crime does not pay."

John Wald was the announcer. Homer Canfield and Warren Lewis were producers, and Canfield was the director. Music was by J. Frederick Albech. Writers were Lou Rusoff and Don Brinkley, and Warren Lewis was the script supervisor.
