= Call the Police (radio program) =

1947-1949 old-time radio crime drama

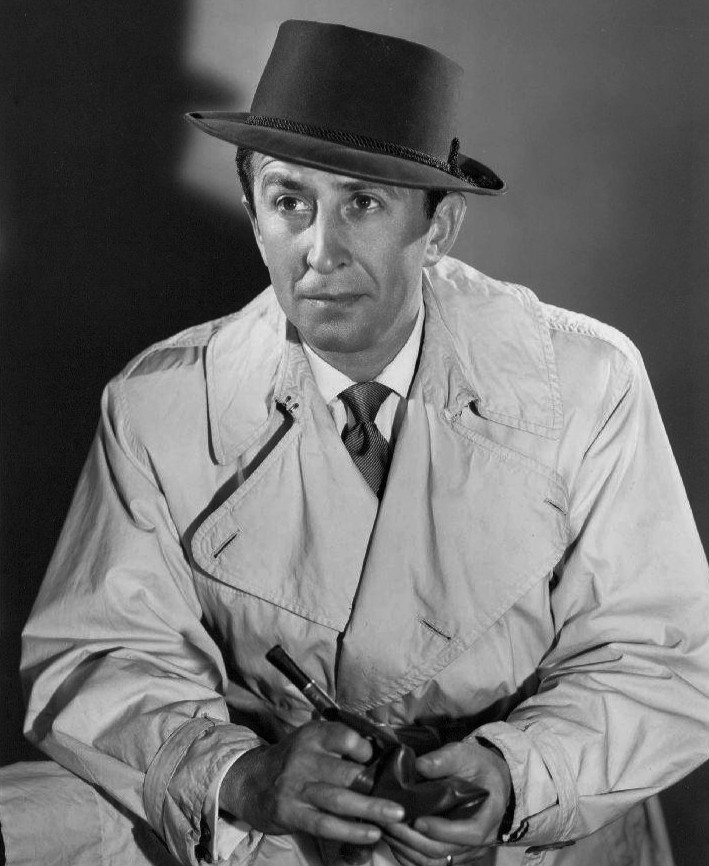
- George Petrie starred in Call the Police in 1948–1949.
- Genre: Crime drama
- Running time: 30 minutes
- Country of origin: United States
- Language: English
- Syndicates: NBC; CBS
- Starring: Joseph Julian; George Petrie
- Announcer: Hugh James; Jay Sims
- Written by: Peter Barry; Frank Lane; Lou Vittes
- Directed by: John Cole
- Produced by: John Cole
- Original release: June 3, 1947 – October 25, 1949
- Sponsored by: Lever Brothers (Rinso and Lifebuoy); S. C. Johnson & Son (Johnson Wax)

Call the Police is an old-time radio crime drama in the United States. It was broadcast on NBC June 3, 1947 – September 28, 1948, and on CBS June 5, 1949 – September 25, 1949.

== Premise ==
Bill Grant, the main character of Call the Police was a Marine who had served in World War II and whose father had been a policeman who was killed in the line of duty. The younger Grant went to the FBI Academy and then returned to his hometown to find that criminals had taken control. He took on the challenge of cleaning up crime in the city.

Vincent Terrace, in Radio Programs, 1924-1984: A Catalog of More Than 1800 Shows, summarized the program's format as follows, "The stories are hard-hitting re-creations of gruesome crimes, the step-by-step actions of the criminals and the police efforts to apprehend the culprits."

== Reviews ==
Media critic John Crosby described Call the Police as "[o]ne bad penny which turns up every summer." He added, "The plots move just short of the speed of sound and are wildly complicated, though, I'm forced to admit, fairly ingenious."

A review in the June 12, 1948, issue of the trade publication Billboard said that summer's first episode "was written with punch and verve and brought [to] life by excellent characterizations ..."

The trade publication Variety said that the June 1, 1948, episode (the show's premiere for that summer) "makes up in smart dialog and swift pace for its run-of-the-mill character." The review noted the episode's "good" performances, "striking" sound effects, and "fine" music bridges, and it said that the sometimes flippant dialog "brightens up the program".

== Personnel ==
Grant was portrayed by Joseph Julian (1947) and George Petrie (1948-1949). Libby Tyler, a criminal psychologist and Grant's girlfriend, was played by Joan Tompkins (1947) and Amzie Strickland (1948-1949). Sergeant Maggio, Grant's assistant, was played by Robert Dryden. Actors frequently heard in supporting roles included Ed Jerome, Mandel Kramer, George Matthews, Bill Smith, and Alice Reinheart. The announcers were Jay Sims (1947) and Hugh James (1948-1949).

John Cole produced and directed the program. Writers were Peter Barry, Frank Lane, and Lou Vittes. Ben Ludlow provided the music.

== Schedule and sponsors ==
Call the Police was a summer replacement program for the three years it was broadcast, filling the time slot of Amos 'n' Andy each year. The 1947 and 1949 broadcasts were sponsored by Lever Brothers, advertising Rinso laundry soap and Lifebuoy soap. The 1948 broadcasts were sponsored by S. C. Johnson & Son, advertising Johnson Wax.

== See also ==
- Crime Does Not Pay
- Dragnet
- Gang Busters
