= Her Honor, Nancy James =

1938-1939 radio soap opera

- Genre: Soap opera
- Running time: 15 minutes
- Country of origin: United States
- Language(s): English
- Syndicates: CBS
- Starring: Barbara Weeks
- Announcer: Frank Gallop
- Written by: Dave Victor; Herbert Little, Jr.
- Directed by: Basil Loughrane
- Narrated by: Mel Allen
- Original release: October 3, 1938 – July 28, 1939
- Sponsored by: Kleenex

Her Honor, Nancy James is an American radio soap opera. It was broadcast Mondays to Fridays on CBS from October 3, 1938 to July 28, 1939.

== Format ==
Her Honor, Nancy James related "the dramatic events in the restoration of a big city which has been overrun by corrupt politicians who have intimidated law-abiding citizens and undermined legitimate business with their rackets." The program featured "dramatic incidents in the life of Nancy James, a judge in the Court of Common Relations in Metropolis City." It was described as being one of "two sympathetic portrayals of judges" during the golden age of radio and as an example of how "The popular culture at the time ... glamorized single working women and affirmed their active role in public life."

After having been a social worker, the title character was appointed to be the judge of a "special Court of Common Problems."

== Personnel ==
The title role was played by Barbara Weeks. Others in the cast and their roles are shown in the table below.

Character	Actor or actress
Mayor Richard Wharton	Joseph Curtin
Evelyn Wharton	Kay Strozzi
Anthony Hale	Ned Wever
Carrie Dean	Alice Reinheart
Madge Keller	Janice Gilbert
Stan Adamic	Chester Stratton
Ellen Clark	Joan Banks
George Novack	Maurice Franklin
Laura	Claire Niesen
Dr. Baxter	Michael Fitzmaurice
Bob Doering	Carl Frank
Closing voice	Basil Loughrane

Source: On the Air: The Encyclopedia of Old-Time Radio, except as indicated.

Mel Allen was the program's narrator; Frank Gallop was the announcer. Basil Loughrane was the director. The program's writers were Dave Victor and Herbert Little, Jr.
