= Amzie Strickland =

American actress (1919–2006)

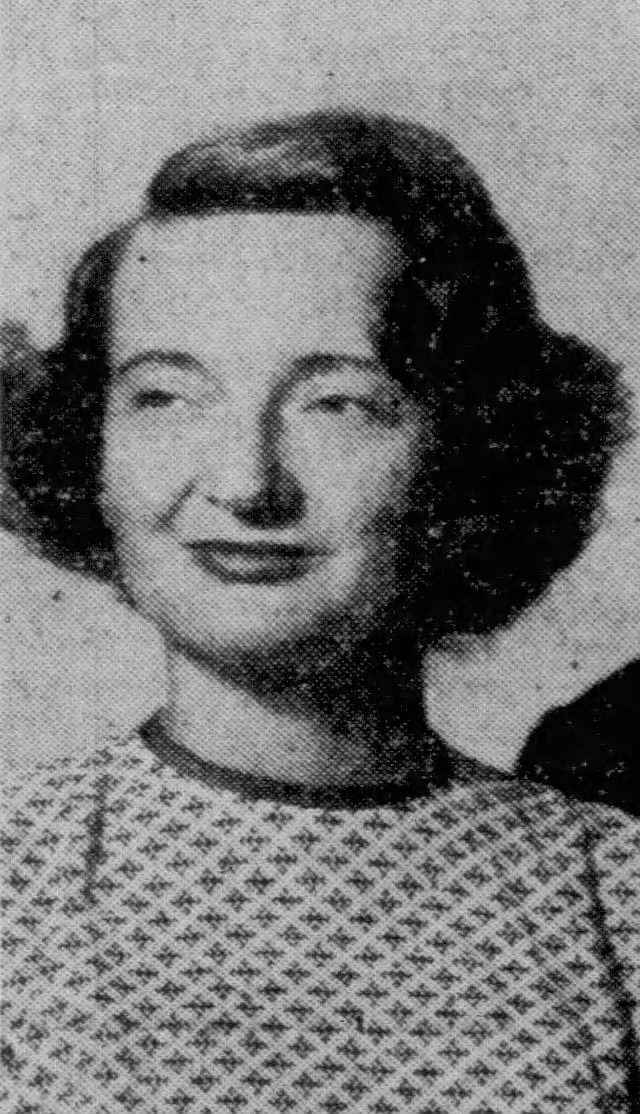
- Strickland in 1955
- Born: January 10, 1919; Oklahoma City, Oklahoma, U.S.
- Died: July 5, 2006 (aged 87); Spokane, Washington, U.S.
- Occupation: Actress
- Years active: 1937–2001
- Known for: Doc Hollywood
- Spouse: Frank Behrens (m. 1946; died 1986)
- Children: 1

Amzie Ellen Strickland (January 10, 1919 – July 5, 2006) was an American character actress who began in radio, made some 650 television appearances, had roles in two dozen films, appeared in numerous television movies, and also worked in TV commercials.

== Radio ==
Strickland began as a radio actress during the old-time radio era, and her various radio roles included those shown in the table below.

Program	Role
Call the Police	Libby
The Fat Man	Cathy Evans
Our Gal Sunday	Erica Dorn
The Romance of Helen Trent	Harriet Eagle

== Television ==
Strickland appeared (sometimes on a recurring basis) on such programs as Adam-12, Dragnet, with Jack Webb, Gunsmoke, The Dick Van Dyke Show, The Andy Griffith Show, I Love Lucy, My Favorite Martian, Make Room for Daddy, The Twilight Zone, My Three Sons, Leave It to Beaver, Gunsmoke (S2E10’s “Greater Love” as Mrs. Brant in 1956), Gomer Pyle, U.S.M.C., Mission: Impossible, Alias Smith and Jones, Happy Days, Carter Country, Bonanza, The Golden Girls, The Facts of Life, The Jeffersons, Three's Company, ER, Dr. Quinn, Medicine Woman, 7th Heaven, Ellen, Wings, ALF, Dragnet, Father Dowling Mysteries, Full House, Ned and Stacey, Perry Mason, "Ironside" and Knight Rider. Her television movies include Tower of Terror and Inherit the Wind.

== Films ==
Her film credits include roles in Captain Newman, M.D., Penelope, Kotch, Harper Valley PTA, Pretty Woman, Doc Hollywood, Shiloh, and Krippendorf's Tribe.

== Personal life and death ==
Strickland was born in Oklahoma City, Oklahoma.

She was married to radio and television actor Frank Behrens from 1946 until his death in 1986. They had a son, Tim Behrens.

She died of Alzheimer's disease at the age of 87 in 2006.
