= Don Diamond =

American actor (1921–2011)

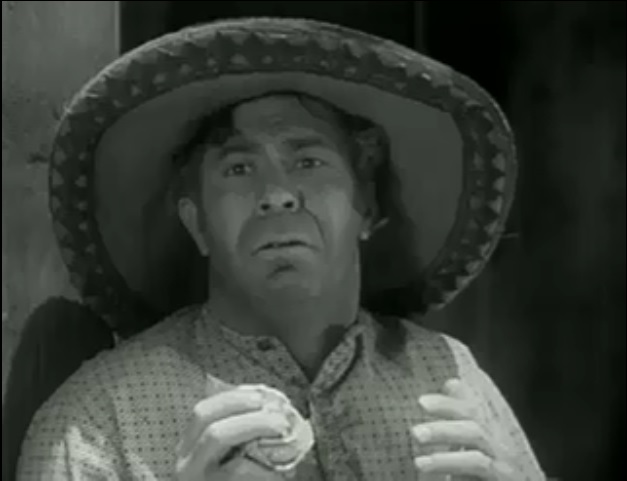
- Diamond in Raiders of Old California
- Born: Donald Alan Diamond; June 4, 1921; Brooklyn, New York, U.S.
- Died: June 19, 2011 (aged 90); Los Angeles, California, U.S.
- Education: University of Michigan
- Occupation: Actor
- Years active: 1949–1987
- Spouse: Louisa Tassler (m. 1965)
- Children: 3

Donald Alan Diamond (June 4, 1921 – June 19, 2011) was an American radio, film, and television actor who portrayed "Crazy Cat", the sidekick and heir apparent to Chief Wild Eagle on the popular 1960s television sitcom, F Troop (1965–1967). He also co-starred as "El Toro", the sidekick of Bill Williams' main character of Kit Carson in 105 episodes of the popular early television series, The Adventures of Kit Carson, from 1951 to 1955.

== Early years ==
Don Diamond was born in New York City on June 4, 1921. His father, Benjamin, emigrated to the United States from Russia in 1906 with his parents. Benjamin Diamond served in the United States Army in World War I and then became a prosperous clothing merchant. Benjamin and Ruth Diamond had another son, Neal, three years younger than Don, and a daughter, Muriel, nine years younger than Don.

Diamond graduated from the University of Michigan, with a degree in drama supplemented by studies in Spanish. He then enlisted in the United States Army Air Corps. He studied Spanish further while he was stationed in the Southwest.

== Career ==
Discharged in 1946 as a first lieutenant, he began acting on radio and became known for his dialect portrayals of Spaniards and Mexicans. He played El Toro in The Adventures of Kit Carson syndicated television series (1951–1955). Diamond additionally performed as Corporal Reyes on Walt Disney's television series Zorro and Crazy Cat on F Troop. In 1968, Diamond appeared as Diego on The Big Valley in the episode titled "Miranda."

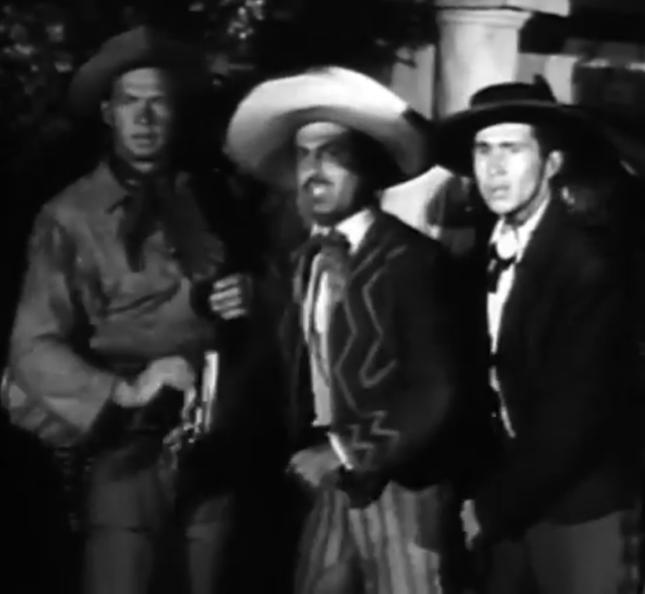
Diamond (center) with Bill Williams and Neyle Morrow in The Adventures of Kit Carson, 1951

He appeared on more than 100 television shows and in many feature films. He performed extensive voice-over work in commercials and cartoons, most notably as the voice of Toro in the DePatie-Freleng Enterprises cartoon series Tijuana Toads.

On radio, Diamond was heard on the NBC crime drama Confession.

== Death ==
Diamond died due to heart failure in Los Angeles, California, on June 19, 2011, at age 90. He was cremated at Groman Eden Mortuary. His ashes were buried at Eden Memorial Park Cemetery afterwards.

== Personal life ==
His wife, Louisa, was a teacher.

== Filmography ==
| Year | Title | Role | Notes |
|---|---|---|---|
| 1949 | The Lone Ranger | Pedro | Episode #7, Pete and Pedro |
| 1950 | Borderline | Deusik | |
| 1957 | Omar Khayyam | Trooper Captain | Uncredited |
| 1957 | Raiders of Old California | Pepe | |
| 1957 | Mr. Adams and Eve | | Episode: "Man with Raven" |
| 1957-1959 | Zorro | Corporal Reyes | 52 episodes |
| 1958 | Fräulein | Russian Soldier | Uncredited |
| 1958 | The Old Man and the Sea | Cafe Proprietor | |
| 1959 | Holiday for Lovers | Airplane Steward | Uncredited |
| 1960 | The Story of Ruth | Yomar | |
| 1961 | Swingin' Along | Tony | |
| 1961 | Man-Trap | Mexican Border Guard | Uncredited |
| 1961 | Rawhide | Mexican Cowhand | S3:E11, "Incident of the Broken Word" |
| 1963 | Irma la Douce | Man with Samples | Uncredited |
| 1963 | Fun in Acapulco | Waiter | Uncredited |
| 1964 | Rawhide | Tony | |
| 1964 | The Carpetbaggers | Gambler | Uncredited |
| 1965-1967 | F Troop | Crazy Cat / Crazy Kat / Brave | 50 episodes |
| 1966 | The Dick Van Dyke Show | Gonzales | Episode #147, Remember the Alimony |
| 1968 | How Sweet It Is! | Bartender | |
| 1969 | Viva Max! | Hernandez | |
| 1969 | Get Smart | Goldmouth | Episode #117, The Treasure of C. Errol Madre |
| 1970 | Mrs. Pollifax-Spy | DeGamez | |
| 1972 | Pete 'n' Tillie | Policeman | Uncredited |
| 1972 | Hit Man | Nano Zito | |
| 1973 | Breezy | Maitre'D | |
| 1978 | The Toolbox Murders | Sgt. Cameron | |
| 1978 | The Rockford Files | Coelho | |
| 1980 | Herbie Goes Bananas | Local #2 | |
