= Stacy Harris =

American actor (1918–1973)

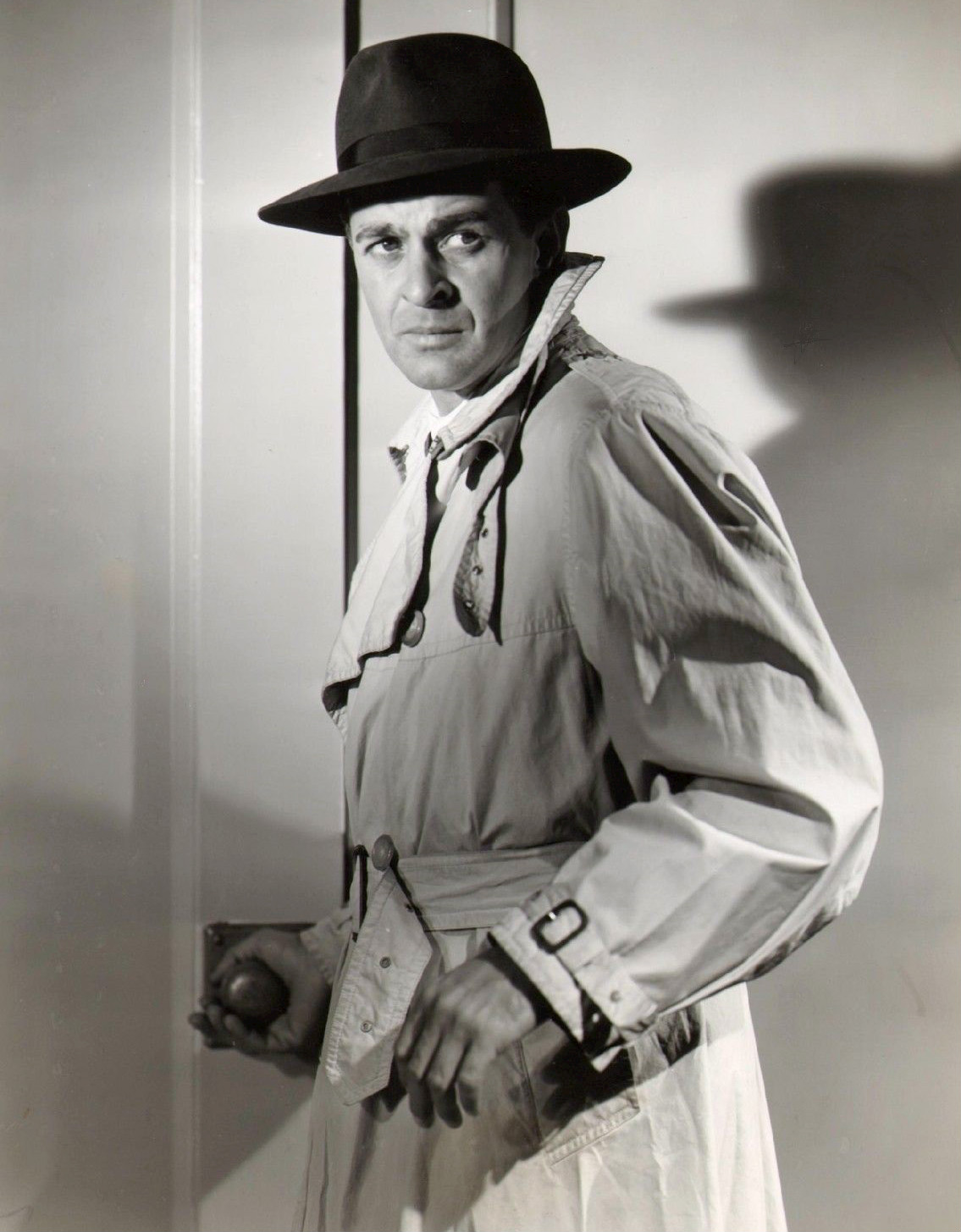
- Harris as Doug Carter in Doorway to Danger, 1953.
- Born: July 26, 1918; Big Timber, Quebec, Canada
- Died: March 13, 1973 (aged 54); Los Angeles, California, U.S.
- Occupation: Actor
- Years active: 1951–1972

Stacy Harris (July 26, 1918 – March 13, 1973) was an American actor with hundreds of film and television appearances. His name is sometimes misspelled Stacey Harris.

== Early years ==
Harris was born on July 26, 1918, in Big Timber, Quebec, Canada; as an infant he and his family moved to Seattle, Washington.

Harris was an Army pilot whose leg was injured in a plane crash less than six months after he enlisted in 1937. That injury prevented him from re-enlisting when World War II began, but he served with the American Field Service as an ambulance driver and with the French Foreign Legion as a dispatch rider. Before becoming an actor, he held a variety of jobs, including newspaper reporter, boxer, sailor, and artist.

== Theatre ==
Harris acted in five Broadway plays and received a New York Critics Award.

== Radio ==
Harris was known for his role as agent Jim Taylor on ABC Radio's This Is Your FBI. In 1946, Jerry Devine, that program's producer-director, told newspaper columnist Jack O'Brian: "Stacy has just the sort of voice I need for the quiet authority of the special agent on my show. On top of that, he's a good actor, and it's a combination on radio which can't be beat."

His other roles in radio programs included Batman in The Adventures of Superman, and Ted Blades in The Strange Romance of Evelyn Winters. He was also a member of the casts of Confession, Dragnet, Pepper Young's Family, Destiny's Trails, and Frontier Gentleman.

== Television ==
A partial list of Harris's roles in television programs includes:

Year	Title	Role	Notes
1951-1953	Doorway to Danger	Agent Doug Carter	
1953	Four Star Playhouse	Frank Le Beau	Season 2 Episode 3: "A Place of His Own" (aired on October 8, 1953)
1955-1957	N.O.P.D.	Detective Victor Beaujac	18 episodes
1956	Four Star Playhouse	Troy	Season 4 Episode 22: "To Die at Midnight"
1957-1961	The Life and Legend of Wyatt Earp	Mayor John P. Clum	23 episodes
1959	Rawhide	Riggs	Season 1 Episode 12: "Incident of the Chubasco"
1960	Bonanza	Regis	Season 1 Episode 18: "A House Divided"
1961	Bonanza	Colonel Clinton Wilcox	Season 3 Episode 3: "The Honor of Cochise"
1961	Rawhide	Sheriff	Season 4 Episode 2: "The Sendoff"
1961	Alfred Hitchcock Presents	Cullen	Season 7 Episode 8: "The Old Pro"
1963	Bonanza	Mr. Corman	Season 5 Episode 4: "Twilight Town"
1963	The Alfred Hitchcock Hour	District Attorney	Season 1 Episode 15: "The Thirty-First of February"
1964	The Alfred Hitchcock Hour	Lawyer	Season 2 Episode 18: "The Final Escape"
1965	Bonanza	Martin Melviney	Season 6 Episode 16: "The Far, Far Better Thing"
1965	Bonanza	Judge Simpson	Season 7 Episode 12: "Five Sundowns to Sunup"
1968	Adam-12	Jim Ralston	Season 1 Episode 15: "Jimmy Eisley's Dealing Smack"
1968	Adam-12	Dr. Edward Lane	Season 1 Episode 20: "I'm Still a Cop"
1969	Bonanza	Harry Teague	Season 11 Episode 5: "Anatomy of a Lynching"
1970	Adam-12	Carl Kegan	Season 3 Episode 12: "Sign of The Twins"
1971	Bearcats!	Emmet Grosvenor	Season 1 Episode 11: "The Big Guns"
1971	O'Hara, U.S. Treasury	Ben Hazzard	Season 1 Pilot Episode: O'Hara, U.S. Treasury"
1971	O'Hara, U.S. Treasury	Ben Hazzard	Season 1 Episode 1: "Operation Big Store"
1971	O'Hara, U.S. Treasury	Ben Hazzard	Season 1 Episode 10: "Operation: Hijack"
1972-1974	Return to Peyton Place	Leslie Harrington	

Harris played varied characters, often villains, on various programs produced by Jack Webb's Mark VII Limited, such as Dragnet, Noah's Ark, GE True, Adam-12, and Emergency!.

Harris guest starred in the religion anthology series Crossroads and played a gangster in the 1956 time travel television episode of the anthology series Conflict entitled "Man from 1997" opposite James Garner and Charles Ruggles. Thereafter, he appeared as Whit Lassiter in the 1958 episode "The Man Who Waited" of the NBC children's western series Buckskin. He guest starred as Colonel Nicholson in the 1959 episode "A Night at Trapper's Landing" of the NBC western series Riverboat starring Darren McGavin.

Harris also appeared in three syndicated series, Whirlybirds, starring Kenneth Tobey, The Sheriff of Cochise and U.S. Marshal, both with John Bromfield, and as the character Ed Miller in the episode "Mystery of the Black Stallion" of the western serious Frontier Doctor starring Rex Allen. He was cast in two episodes of the David Janssen crime drama Richard Diamond, Private Detective.

Harris in 1958 portrayed Max Bowen in "The Hemp Tree" and in 1959 as Abel Crowder in "Rough Track to Payday", episodes of the CBS western series, The Texan, starring Rory Calhoun.

In 1960, Harris was cast as a drummer named Cramer in the episode "Fair Game" of the ABC western series The Rebel starring Nick Adams. Harris appeared in three episodes of CBS's Perry Mason, playing the role of murder victim Frank Curran in "The Case of the Married Moonlighter" (1958), Perry's client Frank Brooks in "The Case of the Lost Last Act" (1959), and murderer Frank Brigham in "The Case of the Crying Comedian" in 1961. In 1963 Harris appeared as a Gambler on the TV western The Virginian in the episode titled "If You Have Tears". In 1964 he appeared as the sheriff in the first episode of season 8 of "Wagon Train" - The Bob Stuart Story. In 1969, Harris played the corrupt and cowardly Mayor Ackerson in the episode "The Oldest Law" of Death Valley Days.

== Death ==
Harris died March 13, 1973, at the age of 54 in Los Angeles, California, of an apparent heart attack.

== Filmography ==
Year	Title	Role	Notes
1950	Appointment with Danger	Paul Ferrar	
1951	His Kind of Woman	Harry	Uncredited
1953	The Redhead from Wyoming	Chet Jones	
1953	The Great Sioux Uprising	Uriah	
1954	Dragnet	Max Troy	
1955	New Orleans Uncensored	Scrappy Durant	
1956	Comanche	Downey	
1956	The Mountain	Nicholas Servoz	
1956	The Brass Legend	George Barlow	
1957	Raintree County	Union Lieutenant	Uncredited
1958	New Orleans After Dark	Vic Beaujac	this is an expanded version for theaters of "The Case Of The Missing Cigars" episode from the N.O.P.D. TV series
1958	The Hunters	Colonel Monk Moncavage	
1959	Good Day for a Hanging	Coley	
1959	Cast a Long Shadow	Eph Brown	
1962	Four for the Morgue	Lieutenant Victor Beaujac	
1963	It's a Mad, Mad, Mad, Mad World	Police Radio Unit F-7	Voice, Uncredited
1965	Sylvia	Mr. Leland	Uncredited
1965	Brainstorm	Josh Reynolds	
1965	The Great Sioux Massacre	Mr. Turner	
1965	The Money Trap	Drunken Man	(scenes deleted)
1966	An American Dream	Detective O'Brien	
1967	Countdown	Technician	Uncredited
1968	Bullitt		Voice, Uncredited
1970	Bloody Mama	Agent McClellan	
1970	The Wife Swappers	Psychiatrist	
1970	Noon Sunday	Operations Commander Callan	
