= Melville Ruick =

American actor (1898–1972)

- Ruick as Dr. Barton Crane in City Hospital in 1953.
- Born: July 8, 1898; Boise, Idaho, U.S.
- Died: December 24, 1972 (aged 74); Los Angeles, California, U.S.
- Occupation: Actor
- Years active: 1915–1972
- Spouses: Lurene Tuttle (m. 1928; div. 1945); Claire Niesen (m. 1949; died 1963)
- Children: Barbara Ruick
- Relatives: John Williams (son-in-law); Joseph Williams (grandson)

Melville Ruick (July 8, 1898 – December 24, 1972) was an American actor.

== Early years ==
Ruick was born in Boise, Idaho, in 1898 to Amanda (née Hughes) and Norman Ruick. His father was a U.S. district attorney in Idaho, and Ruick studied law at the University of California.

== Military service ==
World War I changed Ruick from a student lawyer to a student pilot. Ruick won his wings in the Air Service, Signal Corps, two weeks before the end of the war. He was the United States' youngest flier in the war at age 17 and became a lieutenant at age 18.

During World War II, Ruick returned to uniform as a captain in the USAAF, attached to the Radio Production Unit as a producer-director.

== Career ==
Ruick worked five years as master of ceremonies for the Fanchon and Marco shows.

During the Great Depression, Ruick doubled as a bandleader and as an actor in theatrical stock. An offer came from CBS to work as a local radio announcer while Ruick was leading a dance band in Los Angeles. He later won an audition for the spot of announcer on the CBS radio show Lux Radio Theater, staying with the show for six years.

After World War II, Ruick reentered show business, touring with Leo Carrillo in a revival of The Bad Man. While trying his luck on Broadway, Ruick received an offer to direct Paul Whiteman's radio show for the U.S. National Guard.

Ruick starred as Chief John Randolph on the NBC adventure series The Door with No Name (1951) and as Dr. Barton Crane on the dramatic series City Hospital (1951) on ABC-TV and CBS radio. He also guest-starred in a number of popular 1960s shows, including The Fugitive, The Wild Wild West and The Invaders.

== Personal life ==
He was married to actresses Lurene Tuttle and Claire Niesen (the former of whom he had a daughter with, actress Barbara Ruick). He was also the father-in-law of composer-conductor John Williams and the maternal grandfather of Joseph Williams.

=== Death ===
Ruick died in Los Angeles on December 24, 1972, aged 74.

== See also ==
- List of American actors
- List of people from Idaho
- List of people from Los Angeles
