= Claire Niesen =

American actress

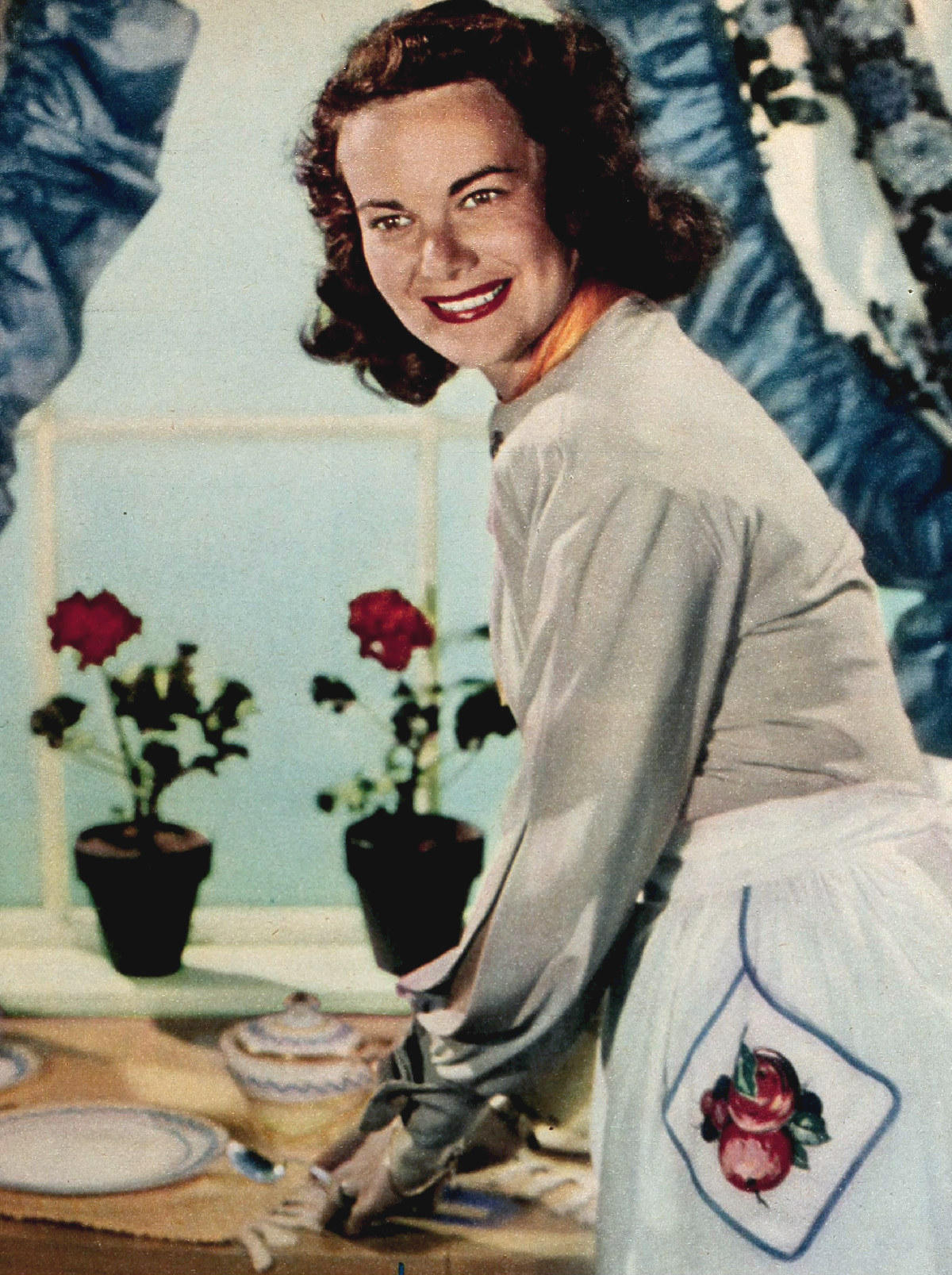
- Niesen as Mary Noble in Backstage Wife
- Born: c. 1920; Phoenix, Arizona
- Died: October 4, 1963 (aged 42–43); Encino, California
- Spouse: Melville Ruick (m. 1949)
- Children: 1

Claire Niesen (c. 1920 – October 4, 1963) was an American actress, primarily on radio.

== Early years ==
Born in Phoenix, Arizona, she wanted to be an actress from age 4.

She was valedictorian of her class at a high school in New York City and attended the Feagin School of Dramatic Art. She had experience in vaudeville before she began working in radio.

== Radio ==
Niesen debuted on radio on a small station when she was 15 years old, having roles in works by Ibsen and Shakespeare. She starred on network soap operas for two decades. She first acted on network radio in Joyce Jordan, M.D. Her roles on radio programs included those shown in the table below.

Program	Role
Backstage Wife	Mary Noble
Her Honor, Nancy James	Laura
The O'Neills	Peggy
The Second Mrs. Burton	Terry Burton
We Who Dream	Dream Girl

Source: Radio Stars: An Illustrated Biographical Dictionary of 953 Performers, 1920 through 1960, except as noted.

In his book, Historical Dictionary of American Radio Soap Operas, Jim Cox wrote: "Mary Noble's alter ego, Niesen, consistently projected the appealing inflections required by the role: invariably soft-spoken, tenderhearted, and forgiving. Her empathetic expressions contributed to winning the part and helping her keep it for the final 14 years the serial was on the air (1945–59)."

Other programs in which Niesen was heard included Life Can Be Beautiful, The Right to Happiness, Light of the World, Meet Miss Julia, Into the Light, The Man I Married, We, the People, March of Time and Manhattan at Midnight.

== Stage ==
Niesen's Broadway credits include The Talley Method (1940) and Cue for Passion (1940).

== Recognition ==
In 1943, Niesen won the Philco Hall of Fame Award.

== Personal life ==
Niesen married the actor Melville Ruick on March 11, 1949, in New York City.

== Death ==
Niesen died of cancer in Encino, California on October 4, 1963. She was survived by her husband, a daughter and a sister.
