= Young Doctor Malone =

American television series

Young Dr. Malone
- Young Doctor Malone producer Betty Corday with husband Ted Corday in the 1940s
- Genre: Daytime serial drama
- Running time: 15 minutes
- Country of origin: United States
- Language: English
- Syndicates: Blue Network; CBS
- TV adaptations: Young Dr. Malone
- Starring: Alan Bunce; Joan Alexander; Gertrude Warner
- Announcer: Ron Rawson
- Created by: Irna Phillips
- Produced by: Betty Corday
- Original release: November 20, 1939 – November 25, 1960
- Audio format: Mono
- Sponsored by: General Foods; Post Cereals; Procter & Gamble

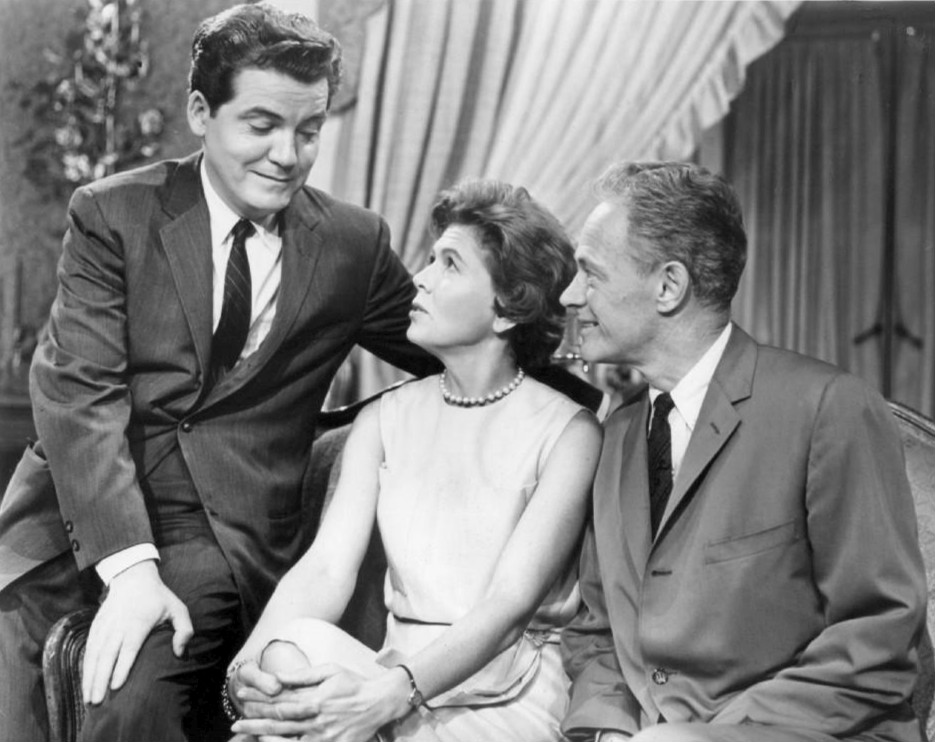
TV cast, L-R: John Connell, Augusta Dabney, William Prince (1962)

Young Doctor Malone is an American soap opera, created by Irna Phillips, which had a long run on radio and television from 1939 to 1963. The producer was Betty Corday (1912–1987), who also produced Pepper Young's Family and later was a co-creator with husband Ted Corday of NBC Daytime's Days of Our Lives.

Sponsored by General Foods and Post Cereals, the radio serial began on the Blue Network on November 20, 1939. The 15-minute program aired daily at 11:15 am, continuing until April 26, 1940. Without a break, it moved to CBS on April 29, 1940, where it was heard for two decades, first airing at 2:00 pm weekdays (1940–1944) and then 1:30 pm (1945–1960). In 1945, Procter & Gamble assumed sponsorship of the program.

== Radio ==
When the serial began, Alan Bunce portrayed small-town physician Dr. Jerry Malone, who dispensed prescriptions and advice to the folks of Three Oaks. Others heard in the title role were Carl Frank, Harold Miller, Charles Irving (during the mid-1940s) and Sandy Becker (beginning in 1947). With organists Charles Paul and Milton Kaye providing the background music, the storylines focused on Jerry, his wife Ann Richards Malone (Elizabeth Reller, Barbara Weeks) and their daughter Jill, initially portrayed by child impersonator Madeleine Pierce. As Jill grew up, she was played by Joan Lazer and Rosemary Rice. Malone's mother (Evelyn Varden, Vera Allen) usually intruded with a few choice words on the activities of her son. When Jerry made trips to New York, Three Oaks businessman Sam Williams (Berry Kroeger) let Ann know his true feelings for her. During World War II, Jerry was believed to be dead after he was shot down over Germany. In the early 1950s, after Ann's death, Jerry married Tracey (Joan Alexander, Jone Allison, Gertrude Warner).

Ron Rawson was the announcer. James Young (who went on to produce and direct General Hospital), Ira Ashley, Stanley Davis, Walter Gorman and Theodora Yates directed scripts by Frank Provo, Ian Martin, Richard Holland, David Driscoll, Julian Funt, David Lesan and Charles Gussman, who also wrote for The Right to Happiness and The Road of Life.

In the early 1950s, Procter & Gamble had 13 soap operas on the air but decided to expand the audience in June 1952 by recording the live CBS broadcasts of The Brighter Day and Young Dr. Malone and airing them one day later on NBC.

The radio program ended on November 25, 1960, known as "the last day of radio soap opera" because CBS cancelled several other series on that day, including Ma Perkins, The Second Mrs. Burton and The Right to Happiness.

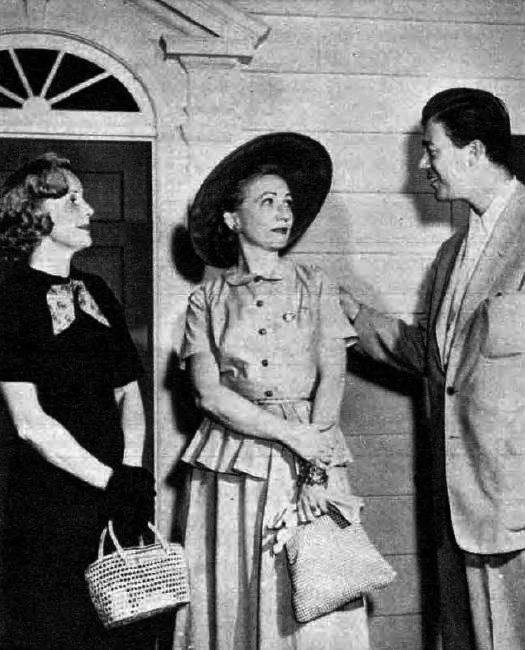
Pictured from left: Elspeth Eric (Lucia Standish), Barbara Weeks (Anne Malone), Sandy Becker (Dr. Jerry Malone). When the Malones move from Three Oaks to New York City, Lucia offers to sell them a home at a bargain price because she has designs on Jerry.

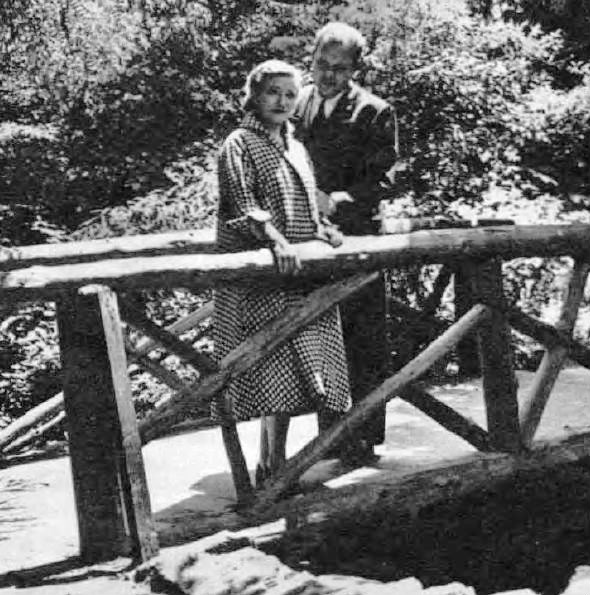
Pictured from left: Barbara Weeks (Anne Malone) and Berry Kroeger (Sam Williams). Separated from Jerry, Sam Williams makes his feelings for Anne known; she is torn by the thought of deciding between him and Jerry.

== Television ==
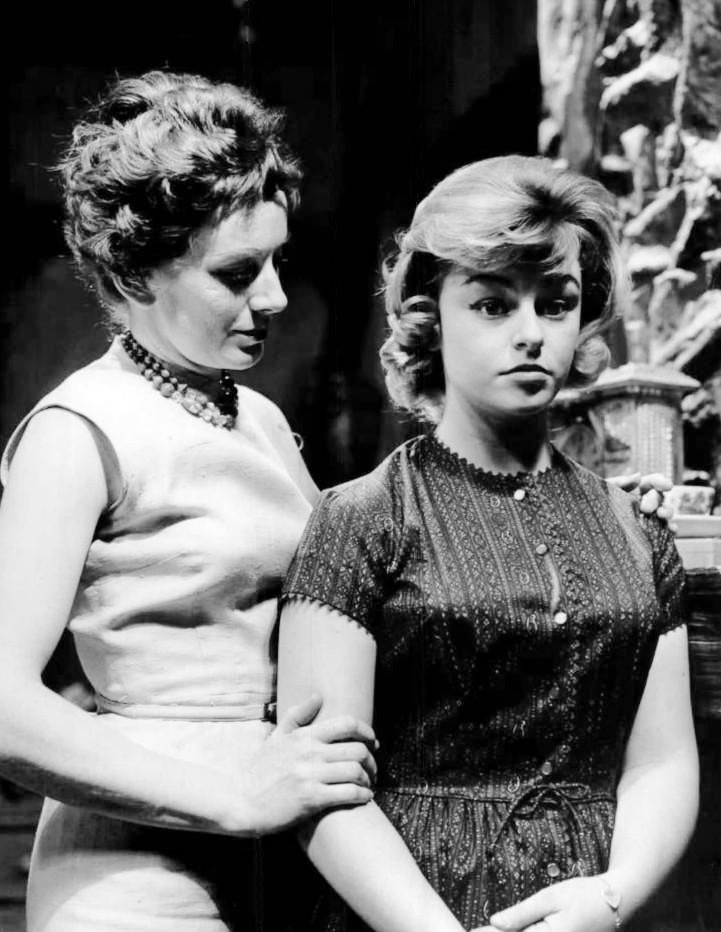
Chase Crosley as Faye Bannister and Patty McCormick as Lisha Steele in 1962.

The television series was broadcast on NBC from December 29, 1958, to March 29, 1963. The TV storyline was set in fictional Denison, Maryland and concentrated on the later lives of father and son doctors, Dr. Jerry Malone (William Prince) and Dr. David Malone (John Connell) at Valley Hospital. Jerry's wife, Tracey, was played first by Virginia Dwyer, then for most of the show's run by Augusta Dabney. Prince and Dabney became real-life husband and wife in 1964.

The show was a sophisticated blend of hospital drama, family life and urbane humor. Tracey's father, foundry president Emory Bannister (Judson Laire), regretted his second marriage to neurotic social climber Clare (Lesley Woods). After Emory died, Clare married a kindred spirit, slithery operator Lionel Steele (Martin Blaine), who later realized he had a conscience. Lionel's nephew Larry Renfrew (Dick Van Patten) was a small-time wheeler-dealer who married the Malones' daughter Jill (Freda Holloway, Kathleen Widdoes, Sarah Hardy) while Diana Hyland—Van Patten's future on-screen wife on Eight Is Enough—played Gig Houseman, David Malone's wife. Tracey's fragile sister Faye (Chase Crosley, Lenka Petersen) married Jerry's friend and colleague, Dr. Stefan Koda (Michael Ingram). Soap veteran William Post, Jr. played Jerry's other close friend and advisor, attorney Harold Cranston, who harbored feelings for Tracey. Other actors who appeared on the TV show included Peter Brandon, Nicolas Coster, Louis Edmonds, Hugh Franklin, Joan Hackett, Luke Halpin, Emily McLaughlin, Joyce Van Patten and Ann Williams.

== See also ==
- List of radio soaps

== Listen to ==
- Young Dr. Malone on complete broadcast day: June 6, 1944
- Young Dr. Malone preempted by CBS News Roundup on June 7, 1944
