= Barbara Weeks (radio actress) =

American actress

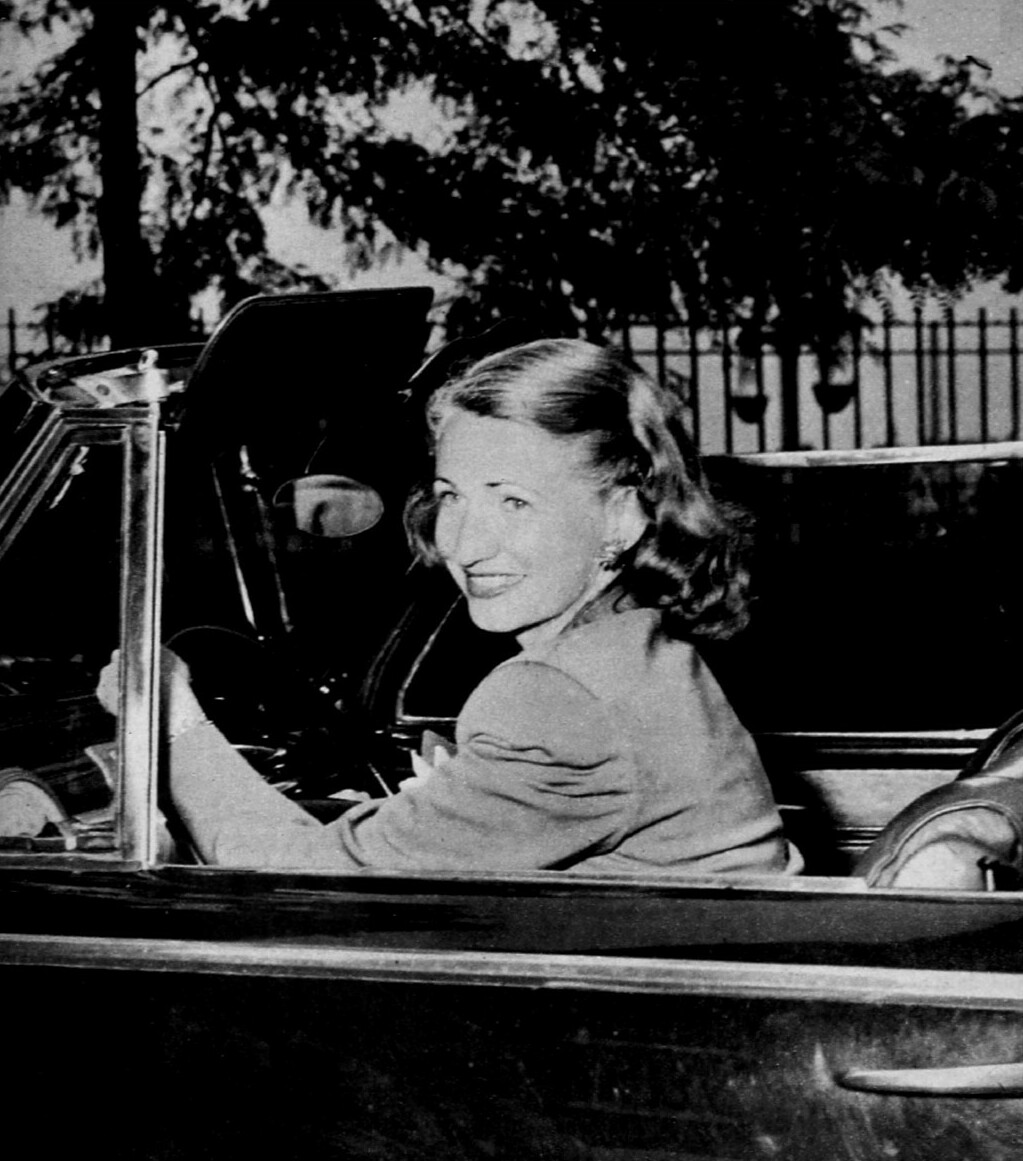
- As Ann Malone (1946)
- Born: October 27, 1906; Binghamton, New York, U.S.
- Died: July 4, 1954 (aged 47); New York City, U.S.
- Occupation: Actress
- Known for: Her Honor, Nancy James; Young Doctor Malone
- Spouse: Carl Douglas Frank (1938-1954)
- Children: 1

Barbara Weeks (October 27, 1906 - July 4, 1954) was an American actress and voice talent in the Golden Age of Radio. She was best known for her work in soap operas.

== Early years ==
Weeks was the daughter of Mr. and Mrs. Edwin R. Weeks of Binghamton, New York. Her parents were singers before her father started a music store. "One of her ancestors, Mrs. Robert R. Jillson," was also an actress. Weeks attended the American Academy of Dramatic Arts.

== Radio ==
A caption in a 1937 newspaper reported that Weeks' "radio career started in Mickey at the Circus and Roadways to Romance." However, another source reported, "She made her radio debut as a vocalist on a Portland, Maine, station." In June 1938, she had the lead role in an NBC broadcast of Anna Christie.

Her only lead role in a continuing radio program occurred when she played the title character in Her Honor, Nancy James, which began on CBS October 3, 1938, and continued through July 28, 1939.

Weeks' roles as a regular cast member in radio programs included those listed in the table below.

Program	Role
As the Twig Is Bent (We Love and Learn)	Madame Sophie
Her Honor, Nancy James	Nancy James
Howie Wing	Donna Cavendish
Linda's First Love	NA
Meet the Dixons	Joan Dixon
Now and Forever -- A Love Story	Ellen Harris
The Open Door	Liza Arnold
We Love and Learn	Sophie De Bellay
Young Doctor Malone	Ann Malone

Source: Radio Programs, 1924-1984, except as noted.

Weeks also appeared in episodes of other programs, including Alias Jimmy Valentine, Philip Morris Playhouse, Mr. District Attorney, Theatre Guild on the Air, Mr. and Mrs. North, Good Will Hour, Aunt Jenny's Real Life Stories, and Colgate Theatre of Romance.

== Stage ==
Before venturing into radio, Weeks "was winning praise with stock companies." After attending the American Academy of Dramatic Arts, she "put in several years of stage trouping." She appeared in at least five Broadway productions between 1927 and 1936, including a revival of Lombardi Limited.

== Name confusion ==
Weeks was often confused for fellow actress Barbara Weeks, who mainly worked in film. At one time, both lived in New York, which meant that "Barbara-in-radio frequently gets mail and telephone calls intended for Barbara-in-the-movies." The confusion even extended to some of the movie actress's relatives attending a performance of a touring stock company in which the radio actress appeared, expecting to see their cousin perform.

== Personal life ==
On November 26, 1938, Weeks married actor Carl Frank, who played her husband in Young Doctor Malone. They also played husband and wife roles in Now and Forever -- A Love Story. They had a daughter, Roberta, born September 24, 1940.
