= Studio One (radio series) =

American radio dramatic anthology series (1947–1948)

Studio One is an American radio dramatic anthology series that was broadcast on CBS from April 29, 1947, through July 27, 1948. It was created by Canadian director Fletcher Markle, who came to CBS Radio Network from the Canadian Broadcasting Corporation. It launched as a 60-minute CBS Radio Network series with an adaptation of Malcolm Lowry's Under the Volcano, broadcasting on Tuesdays opposite Fibber McGee and Molly and The Bob Hope Show at 9:30 pm Eastern Time.

== Overview ==
Studio One focused on presenting adaptations of novels and plays that had seldom, if ever, been broadcast, and the script editor had instructions to deviate as little as possible from the original work. Authors whose works were adapted for the program included Dashiell Hammett, Sinclair Lewis, Edna Ferber, Thomas Hardy, Prosper Mérimée, Ring Lardner, Henrik Ibsen, Benn Levy, and Malcolm Lowry. Fletcher Markle, the director, sometimes acted in episodes.

Initially the program used a stock company of radio actors that included Anne Burr, Joe DeSantis, Robert Dryden, Mercedes McCambridge, Paul McGrath, Stefan Schnabel, and Hester Sondergaard. Late in 1947 CBS instituted a "name talent policy" to bring in better-known actors as guest stars. The trade publication Billboard reported that the change, to be accomplished by increasing the show's talent budget, was made in hopes of attracting a sponsor. Another trade publication, Variety, said, "This may be the first time a sustaining series has ever taken the plunge into the film talent pool in such a pretentious way." Stars who appeared under the new policy included Marlene Dietrich, Charles Laughton, James Mason, Franchot Tone, and Robert Young.

== Production ==
Robert J. Landry was the producer of Studio One, with Markle writing and directing. Lee Vines was the announcer, and Alexander Semmier provided the music.

Studio One was initially broadcast on Tuesdays from 9:30 to 10:30 p.m. Eastern Time. CBS executives scheduled the program opposite NBC's shows that featured Fibber McGee and Molly and Bob Hope. The plan was "to build up an audience through the use of the longest possible adaptations of novels and other material suitable for radio plays." Features provided by the series's "rather healthy budget" included a 20-piece orchestra. Beginning February 3, 1948, Studio One was broadcast from 10 to 11 p.m. Eastern Time on Tuesdays as part of a CBS move toward "mood programming". It followed The Adventures of Christopher Wells, which was also shifted to that night. Creation of Tuesday as a night of drama on CBS followed the network's making Friday a night of comedy and reserving Sunday afternoons for "a period of continuous musical programs".

Studio One was CBS's highest-rated sustaining program. Its Hooper ratings were usually in the 9-10 range. Total production costs from its launch through the first half of 1948 were estimated at $300,000. It received Honorable Mention in the 1947 Peabody Awards in the field of drama. The citation noted the program's use of "remarkable material from books, plays, and short stories, preserving the spirit of the original in a production which, at its best, is distinguished for its taste, restraint, and radio craftsmanship."

== Displaced by Ford Theater ==
The demise of Studio One as a radio program began when Ford Theater moved from NBC to CBS effective October 8, 1948. An article in the trade publication Billboard suggested three reasons that Studio One would likely be dropped after Ford Theatre began on CBS:

- Ford Theatre's budget for guest stars was a reported $5,000 — in contrast to the $1,500 of Studio One.
- If both programs were on the air, Ford Theatre's commercial status would enable it to consistently obtain better scripts.
- Ford might oppose continuation of Studio One because "the format of the two shows is virtually identical."

Variety reported tentative plans that called for Markle to become director of Ford Theater, which "would provide the opportunity to jettison Studio One without undue formality." In July 1948 CBS executives William Paley, Hubbell Robinson, and Frank Stanton met to discuss possibly making Studio One a West Coast production that would be supervised by Harry Ackerman and produced by William Robson and probably would be converted to an adventure format.

Fletcher Markle directed the CBS Ford Theater series and wrote some of the adaptations used on it. The Studio One radio series stock company of radio actors appeared on the CBS Ford Theater radio series.

Studio One was canceled after Ford Theater's move to CBS, ending its 64-week run. In October 1948 the network announced plans to revive the title on television, with two episodes planned each month from 7:30 to 8:30 p.m. E. T. on Sundays. One of the other two slots was reserved for the TV version of Ford Theater, with the fourth slot not yet filled.

== Episodes ==
Partial List
Date	Title	Actor(s)
April 29, 1947	"Under the Volcano"	Everett Sloane, Robert Dryden, Juano Hernandez, Ralph Camargo, Joe De Santis, Anne Burr, Ivor Francis, Hedley Rennie
May 6, 1947	"Topaz"	Sebastian Cabot, Hester Sondergaard, Everett Sloane, Anne Burr
May 13, 1947	"An Enemy of the People"	Hester Sondergaard
May 20, 1947	"Alibi Ike"	Joe De Santis, Anne Burr, Everett Sloane, Ruth Gilbert, Howard Smith
May 27, 1947	"Dodsworth"	Walter Huston, Everett Sloane, Miriam Wolfe, Mercedes McCambridge, Luella Gear, Anne Seymour, Robert Dryden, Louis Quinn, Hedley Rennie
July 22, 1947	"Holiday"	Fletcher Markle, Anne Burr, Everett Sloane
August 5, 1947	"Carmen"	Everett Sloane, Anne Burr, Fletcher Markle
October 7, 1947	"A Tree Grows in Brooklyn"	
November 4, 1947	"Kitty Foyle"	Mercedes McCambridge, Fletcher Markle
December 30, 1947	"So Big"	Joan Blondell
January 27, 1948	"The Great Impersonation"	Luise Rainer, Walter Slezak, Beverly Roberts
February 17, 1948	"A Farewell to Arms"	
March 16, 1948	"One More Spring"	Susan Peters
March 23, 1948	"The Thirty-Nine Steps"	
March 30, 1948	"Babbitt"	Walter Huston
April 13, 1948	"The Glass Key"	Alan Baxter, Robert Dryden, Joe De Santis, Elissa Landi, Everett Sloane
April 20, 1948	"Pride and Prejudice"	Geraldine Fitzgerald, Cathleen Cordell, Everett Sloane, Sarah Burton
May 4, 1948	"Private Worlds"	Madeleine Carroll
May 11, 1948	"Wine of the Country"	
June 15, 1948	"The Return of the Native"	Michael Redgrave
June 29, 1948	"Arabesque"	Marlene Dietrich, Gary Merrill, Joe De Santis, Ivor Francis, Gregory Morton, Miriam Wolfe, Lee Vines
July 20, 1948	"Spanish Bayonet"	Mercedes McCambridge, Burgess Meredith, Everett Sloane, Gertrude Warner
July 27, 1948	"Constant Nymph"	Cathleen Cordell, Rosemary Rice, Hedley Rennie

== Critical response ==
The radio editor of The Plain Dealer newspaper wrote, "Except for a slightly tired introductory scene" the premiere episode "was imaginative and sure". His review described the dialog as "strong and purposeful and sharply written" and said that the actors "were exceptionally well cast."

Media critic John Crosby wrote that the first two episodes of the program needed "some incisive editing". Although they "were ambitious, adult, absorbing, and, as radio fare goes, very sophisticated drama," he explained, "They were also in parts jerky, cloudy and over-elaborate." Crosby commended the acting but said that he thought Markle was too much involved as director, producer, and writer. He said that a director who was not involved in writing the scripts "might have speeded things a bit".

Magee Adams wrote in The Cincinnati Enquirer that Studio One surpassed the quality of typical summer-replacement programs. He said that it "measures up to Theatre Guild. Which, in this reviewer's book, is top grade." He added, "Summer schedules will have to soar far above usual form to surpass the new CBS production."

Jack Gould of The New York Times called Studio One "an important and welcome supplement to existing radio fare" because the program was "not afraid to present drama of controversy and point of view." He added that this show, combined with then-current documentary programs on CBS presented a challenge to other networks "in meeting the demand for improved balance in programming." Gould complimented the performances of Sloane and Burr while noting that Markle's use of special effects sometimes overshadowed the story. Gould wrote that Markle should "remember that the rudiments of direction must come before the tricky refinements."

Variety's review of the premiere episode noted Markle's use of techniques that included flashbacks, crowing roosters, rapid segues between scenes, thunder-and-lightning backgrounds, and staccato hoofbeats of horses to accompany a conversation and said, "much of it was distracting". The review added that "constant changes in scene" created a choppy effect.
