= Miriam Wolfe =

American-Canadian actress, director, producer and writer (1922–2000)

- Miriam Wolfe, performing live on WOR during her first year as Old Nancy on The Witch's Tale (1935).
- Born: January 2, 1922; Brooklyn, New York City, U.S.
- Died: September 29, 2000 (aged 78); Toronto, Canada
- Occupations: Actress, director, producer and writer

Miriam Wolfe (born Miriam Wolff; January 2, 1922 – September 29, 2000) was an American actress, director, producer and writer, who worked in theatre, television and radio from the 1920s to the 1950s. She is mainly remembered for her character roles on radio's weekly Let's Pretend.

== Early years ==
Wolfe was born in Brooklyn, New York. She made her professional acting debut at age four, reciting poems and reading stories on The Uncle Gee Bee Kiddie Hour on WGBS, one of New York's first radio stations. When she was six years old, she was given the First Witch's part in a children's theater's production of Macbeth.

== Radio roles ==
Although she had appeared earlier on The Children's Hour, Wolfe is best remembered for her diverse roles on Nila Mack's WCBS Saturday morning children's program, Let's Pretend. She joined the repertory acting company in 1934 and remained with the program well into her adult years, playing spooky witches, wicked and wise queens, good and bad spirits, kind and cruel mothers and stepmothers.

At 12, Wolfe auditioned to succeed the 79-year-old Adelaide Fitz-Allen in the part of the ancient witch-narrator Old Nancy on Alonzo Deen Cole's The Witch's Tale (on the Mutual Broadcasting System). Cole, puzzled at first when he saw a young girl in a straw hat and Buster Brown haircut, hired her as soon as he heard the spine-chilling, cackling laugh which became her trademark. She played this part for five years, also doubling as other characters and leading women on the show.

Later, Wolfe was heard regularly from New York and Hollywood on Fletcher Markle's Studio One and Ford Theater (CBS Network). There, she worked with actors such as Lucille Ball, Ingrid Bergman, Montgomery Clift and Marlene Dietrich. She was also heard on American School of the Air, Mystery Hall, Casey, Crime Photographer and Suspense. In the early 1940s, she directed and starred in numerous radio soap operas on WGR and WKBW in Buffalo.

In the 1950s, Wolfe became a weekly regular on The Rayburn & Finch Comedy Hour and Popeye the Sailor (CBS Network), where she played both Olive Oyl and the Sea Hag for several seasons. She was featured in the U.S. Army production of So Proudly We Hail!, starring film and stage actor Lee Tracy. In 1952, as a regular on the television version of Studio One, Wolfe played the Virgin Mary in Markle's television production of the medieval mystery play The Nativity, one of the few times that such a play has been presented on commercial network television.

== CBC ==
In 1956, Wolfe moved to Canada and became active as a performer, writer and director with the Canadian Broadcasting Corporation (CBC). While at CBC she co-authored, produced, directed and played all the roles in the children's series, Miss Switch, and adapted, directed and played all the roles in a one-woman radio version of Paul Bowles' You Are Not I. She was also featured on many CBC commercials, comedy hours and dramas. For Canadian television, she performed featured, leading and starring roles on Wayne and Shuster, Ford Star Time, General Motors Presents and several other well-regarded programs.

== Films ==
During her career, Wolfe worked as a scriptwriter, dubbed more than 50 films and cartoons, appeared in films and made recordings. Notable stage performances include the Broadway production of Make Momma Happy with Molly Picon, a Hollywood production of Tennessee Williams' The Rose Tattoo and a Toronto Crest Theatre production of Eugene O'Neill's Ah, Wilderness! She was elected a member of the Board of the Association of Canadian Television and Radio Actors (ACTRA) in 1958–59.

In 1956, she married Canadian architect John Forrest Mackay Ross. The couple had a child and moved to Paris, where they resided from 1961 to 1980 and where she conducted a series of improvisational workshops.

Upon her return to Toronto, Wolfe concentrated on writing and teaching, developing an original method of teaching the English language and its pronunciation, which later formed the basis of her book, Listening to Language: The Sounds of English. Wolfe also learned Blissymbolics, wrote teachers' guides and directed a weekly workshop for the Ontario Gifted Children's Program. She also worked with the Young People's Theatre. Her involvement with performance continued through her membership from 1981 to 1986 on the Board of the ACTRA Awards.

On September 29, 2000, Wolfe died at her home in Toronto, of breast cancer.

== Awards ==
In 1981, Wolfe received an award from Friends of Old Time Radio USA for her contribution to Radio's Golden Age. In July 2022, Wolfe was inducted into The Worldwide Television And Radio Horror Host Hall Of Fame for her contributions made as horror host "Old Nancy" on WOR, the Mutual Radio Network's "The Witch's Tale".

== Bibliography ==
- Anderson, Arthur: Let's Pretend: A History of Radio's Best Loved Children's Show by a Longtime Cast Member, McFarland & Company, 1994.
- Anderson, Arthur: Let's Pretend and the Golden Age of Radio, BearManor Media, 2004.
- Cole, Alonzo Deen, edited by David S. Siegel with introduction by Miriam Wolfe: The Witch's Tale: Stories of Gothic Horror from the Golden Age of Radio, Dunwich Press, 1998, ISBN 1-891379-01-1.
- Delong, Thomas A: Radio Stars: An Illustrated Biographical Dictionary of 953 Performers, 1920 through 1960, McFarland & Company, 1996, ISBN 978-0-7864-0149-9.
- Hand, Richard J: Terror on the air!: horror radio in America, 1931–1952, McFarland & Company, 2006, ISBN 0-7864-2367-6.
- Maltin, Leonard: The Great American Broadcast: A Celebration of Radio's Golden Age, Dutton, 1997, ISBN 0-525-94183-5. [as Miriam Wolf]
