= Home of Peace =

Home of Peace may refer to the building below or following cemeteries:

- Home of Peace Memorial Park, Los Angeles, California
- Home of Peace Cemetery (Helena, Montana)
- Home of Peace Cemetery (Colma, California)
- Home of Peace Cemetery (Oakland, California)
- Home of Peace Cemetery (Porterville, California)
- Home of Peace Cemetery (Sacramento, California)
- Home of Peace Cemetery (San Diego, California)
- Home of Peace Cemetery (San Jose, California)
- Home of Peace Cemetery (Santa Cruz, California)
- Home of Peace Cemetery (Weld County, Colorado)
- Home of Peace Cemetery (Alexandria, Virginia)
- Home of Peace Cemetery (Lakewood, Washington)

== See also ==
- Peace House, Korean DMZ
