= Florence Freeman (actress) =

American actress (1911–2000)

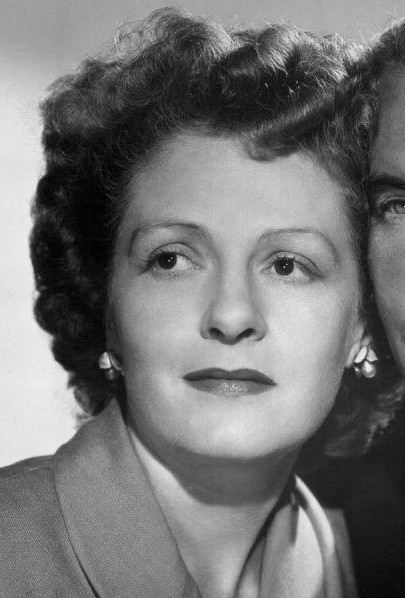
- Florence Freeman (Ellen Brown) from the radio daytime drama Young Widder Brown
- Born: July 29, 1911; New York City, New York
- Died: April 25, 2000 (aged 88); Grant Park, Illinois
- Other name: Florence Freeman Berman
- Education: Wells College; New York State College for Teachers; Columbia University
- Occupation: Actress
- Known for: Acting in soap operas on radio

Florence Freeman (July 29, 1911 – April 25, 2000) was an actress in old-time radio. She was known as a "soap opera queen" for her work in daytime serial dramas.

== Early years ==
Freeman was born in New York City and grew up in Albany, New York. One of her earliest performances came when she was six and gave a recitation of a poem at a World War rally. In high school, she won a medal for dramatics.

Freeman attended Wells College, where she was Campus Queen, New York State College for Teachers, and Columbia University preparing to become a teacher. She taught English before becoming an actress.

Before Freeman began her career in radio, she acted in summer stock theater.

== Radio ==
Freeman's initial job in radio came in 1933 as the result of a challenge. After a friend dared her "to make good as a radio actress", Freeman applied — and was hired — at WOKO in Albany, New York. She went on to become a member of the casts of a number of serials in old-time radio, including being "the heroine of not one but two serials that ran more than a decade."

In 1949, Freeman won the "Your Favorite Daytime Serial Actress" award from Radio Mirror magazine. Her roles on some programs are indicated in the table below.

Program	Role
Dot and Will	Dot Horton
Jane Arden	Betty Harrison
Love and Learn	Sue Blake
The Open Door	Lisa Arnold
Pepper Young's Family	Connie
Valiant Lady	Joan Blaine
Wendy Warren and the News	Wendy Warren
A Woman of America	Prudence Dane Barker
Young Widder Brown	Ellen Brown

She was also a regular on Maxwell House Show Boat, John's Other Wife, Abie's Irish Rose, Are You a Missing Heir? and Love and Learn.

== Personal life ==
Freeman was married to Rabbi Samuel A. Berman of Temple Beth-El in Jersey City, New Jersey, they had three children. Her husband died in 1998. Freeman died April 25, 2000, aged 88, in Grant Park, Illinois.
