= Ward Costello =

American actor (1919–2009)

- Born: Edward Costello; July 5, 1919; Boston, Massachusetts, U.S.
- Died: June 4, 2009 (aged 89); Redlands, California, U.S.
- Occupations: Actor, Composer, Lyricist
- Spouses: Loraine Grover; Gerarda Costello
- Children: 4

Edward "Ward" Costello (July 5, 1919 – June 4, 2009) was an American actor, composer and lyricist.

Costello was born in Boston. When he was young, he left home to go to sea, after which he was an itinerant worker on farms and ranches before he became a newspaper reporter in New York.

Costello served in both the British Royal Air Force and the U.S. Army Signal Corps during the Second World War. He received the Silver Star and three Distinguished Flying Crosses. After he left the military, he was a foreign-news editor for CBS in New York.

He composed and wrote the lyrics to the theme for The Gallant Hours. During his acting career, Costello appeared in several television programs, including Star Trek: The Next Generation, Little House on the Prairie and Alfred Hitchcock Presents. He retired from acting in 1989.

Costello was married to actress Loraine Grover, and they had a daughter, Erin. At the time of his death, he was married to his wife Gerarda. He had four children.

Costello died from complications of a stroke on June 4, 2009, aged 89.

== Selected filmography ==
- The Secret Storm (1954, TV Series) as Peter Ames #3 (1964–1966)
- The Greatest Gift (1954) as Ned Blackman (1954–1955)
- Hallmark Hall of Fame
  - episode The Lark (1957) as Joan's Father
- The Philco Television Playhouse
  - episode Run Like a Thief (1954) as Investigator
- Navy Log
  - episode Operation Hideout (1957) as Varick
- The Alcoa Hour
  - episode Mechanical Manhunt (1957) as Charlie
- Kraft Television Theatre
  - episode Vengeance (1957)
- Suspicion
  - episode Heartbeat (1957)
- Terror from the Year 5000 (1958) as Dr. Robert Hedges
- Alfred Hitchcock Presents (1958)
  - Season 4 Episode 9: "Murder Me Twice" as William G. Burke
- The Gallant Hours (1960) as Captain Harry Black
- The Defenders
  - episode Our Lady Ironsides (1963) as Tom Aufderheidie
- Petrocelli
  - episode Six Strings of Guilt (1976) as Thomas Barnes
- Law of the Land (1976, TV Movie) as E.J. Barnes
- Most Wanted
  - episode The SKy Killer (1976) as Andrew Harris
- The Streets of San Francisco
  - episode Judgment Day (1976) as Judge Amos Abrams
  - episode The Thrill Killers: Part 1 (1976) as Captain Roy Devitt, SFPD
  - episode Hang Tough (1977) as Captain Devitt, SFPD
- MacArthur (1977) as General George C. Marshall
- Police Story
  - episode Day of Terror, Night of Fear (1978)
- Return from Witch Mountain (1978) as Mr. Clearcole
- Barnaby Jones
  - episode Dangerous Gambit (1976) as Charles Markwell
  - episode Death of a Friendship (1978) as Daniel McKnight
- Goldengirl (1979) as Cobb
- Little House on the Prairie
  - episode Portrait of Love (1980) as Jeremy Unger
- Bloody Birthday (1981) as Mr. Taylor
- Whose Life Is It Anyway? (1981) as Mr. Eden
- General Hospital (1963–1989, TV Series) as Martin Drake
- Missing (1982) as Congressman
- Firefox (1982) as General Rogers
- Project X (1987) as Price
- Star Trek: The Next Generation
  - episode Coming of Age (1988) as Admiral Gregory Quinn
  - episode Conspiracy (1988) as Admiral Gregory Quinn
  - episode Shades of Gray (1989) as Admiral Gregory Quinn (archive footage)
- Newhart
  - episode Cupcake on My Back (1989) as Mr. Wallingford
- Roe vs. Wade (1989, TV Movie) (final film role)
