= The Gallant Hours =

1960 American biopic docu-drama directed by Robert Montgomery

- original movie poster
- Directed by: Robert Montgomery
- Written by: Frank D. Gilroy; Beirne Lay, Jr.
- Produced by: James Cagney; Robert Montgomery
- Starring: James Cagney
- Narrated by: Robert Montgomery; Art Gilmore
- Cinematography: Joseph MacDonald
- Edited by: Fredrick Y. Smith (editorial supervisor)
- Music by: Roger Wagner; Ward Costello (theme song)
- Distributed by: United Artists
- Release date: June 22, 1960
- Running time: 115 minutes
- Country: United States
- Language: English
- Box office: $1,500,000 (U.S./ Canada)

The Gallant Hours is a 1960 American docudrama about William F. Halsey, Jr. and his efforts in fighting against Admiral Isoroku Yamamoto and the Imperial Japanese Navy in the Guadalcanal campaign of World War II.

This film was directed by Robert Montgomery, who also did uncredited narration, and stars James Cagney as Admiral Halsey. Featured players include Dennis Weaver, Ward Costello, Vaughn Taylor, Richard Jaeckel, and Les Tremayne. The screenplay was by Frank D. Gilroy and Beirne Lay, Jr., and the unusual a cappella choral score was composed and conducted by Roger Wagner, although the theme song was written by Ward Costello.

The film was produced by Montgomery and Cagney, the only film made by their joint production company. The Gallant Hours was released by the United Artists company on June 22, 1960.

== Description ==
The Gallant Hours depicts the crucial five-week period in October–November 1942 after Admiral Halsey (James Cagney) took command of the beleaguered American forces in the South Pacific Area. That period of combat, highlighted by the Guadalcanal Campaign which serves as the movie’s focus, became a turning point in the struggle against the Japanese Empire in that theatre during World War II. The story is told in flashback, framed by Halsey ceremonially leaving his command in 1947.

Unusual for a war film, the picture has no battle scenes. All the fighting takes place off-screen, and there is an emphasis throughout on logistics and strategy rather than the tactics and combat. Fundamentally, the thrust becomes a battle of wills and wits between the intuitive Halsey and his calculating Japanese counterpart, Admiral Yamamoto (James T. Goto, who was also Technical Advisor for the film). For dramatic effect, the April 1943 Death of Isoroku Yamamoto is made contemporaneous with the naval battle of Guadalcanal, rather than five months later.

Also somewhat unorthodox is that scenes depicting Japanese staff officers were performed in Japanese, with only summary translations provided by the narrator. This narration was remarkably evenhanded in its characterization of the enemy for an American feature film of this period. The use of the Roger Wagner Chorale in lieu of an orchestral score, was an unusual choice. The Gallant Hours libretto, written by Ward Costello, is the following:

I knew a lad who went to sea and left the shore behind him.

I knew him well, the lad was me and now I cannot find him. Away, away, away he went, in deep and salty water.

His girl she waited years for him. She was his neighbor's daughter Away, away, away he went and left the shore behind him. I knew him well, the lad was me and now I cannot find him.

Away, away, away he went, away he went, and now I cannot find him. The rolling sea he would embrace, the rolling sea hath took him.

And passed him on a lonely beach, the roaring sea forsook him.

The film's coda is a textual reprise of a quote delivered earlier as advice from Halsey to an overwhelmed junior flight officer:

"There are no great men, only great challenges that ordinary men are forced by circumstances to meet."

== Cast ==
- James Cagney as William F. Halsey Jr.
- Dennis Weaver as Lieutenant Commander Andrew Jefferson "Andy" Lowe III, USN
- Ward Costello as Captain Harry Black, USN
- Vaughn Taylor as Commander Mike Pulaski, USN
- Richard Jaeckel as Lieutenant Commander Roy Webb, USN
- Les Tremayne as Captain Frank Enright, USN
- Walter Sande as Captain Horace Keys, USN
- Karl Swenson as Captain Bill Bailey, USN
- Leon Lontoc as Chief Petty Officer Salvador Jesus Maravilla, USN
- Robert Burton as Maj. Gen. Roy Geiger, USMC
- Carleton Young as Colonel Evans Carlson, USMC
- Raymond Bailey as Major General Archie Vandegrift, USMC
- Harry Landers as Captain Joseph "Joe" Foss, USMC
- Richard Carlyle as Father Frederic Gehring
- James Yagi as Rear Admiral Jiro Kobe, IJN
- James T. Goto as Admiral Isoroku Yamamoto, IJN
- Carl Benton Reid as Vice-Admiral Robert Ghormley, USN
- Nelson Leigh as Rear Admiral Dan Callaghan, USN (uncredited)
- Sydney Smith as Rear Admiral Norm Scott, USN (uncredited)
- William Schallert as Captain Thomas G. "Tom" Lanphier Jr., USAAF (uncredited)
- John Zaremba as Major General Hubert R. Harmon, USAAF (uncredited)
- Herbert Lytton as Admiral George Murray, USN (uncredited)
- John McKee as Lieutenant Harrison Ludlam, USN (uncredited)
- Tyler McVey as Admiral Ernest J. King, USN (uncredited)
- Selmer Jackson as Admiral Chester Nimitz, USN (uncredited)
- Stuart Randall as Rear Admiral Kelly Turner (uncredited)
- Maggie Magennis as Red Cross Nurse Young (uncredited)
- Art Gilmore as the narrator (Japanese sequences)
- Robert Montgomery as the narrator (American sequences, uncredited)

=== Casting ===
- The sons of the film's two principals, James Cagney, Jr., and Robert Montgomery, Jr., both appear in the film, uncredited, as U.S. Marines. For Cagney, this was his only film appearance, whereas Montgomery appeared in four other films and a half-dozen television episodes.

== Production ==
Montgomery, Halsey, and Cagney on set

Director Robert Montgomery had served under Admiral William F. Halsey, Jr., as a Commander in the U.S. Navy during World War II, and he came up with the idea of making a film about Halsey when he attended the 75th birthday celebration honoring the Admiral in 1957. Montgomery and his good friend James Cagney acquired the rights to Halsey's life story later that year, and they formed a production company, Cagney-Montgomery Productions, to make the film. Montgomery had started directing on 1945's They Were Expendable, substituting for John Ford when Ford was ill, and made his credited directorial debut in 1947 with Lady in the Lake. He had also produced for television before, but The Gallant Hours was the first feature film he both directed and produced. It turned out to be his last involvement of any kind in film and television as a producer, director, or actor. Cagney's foray into production was also his first, and his last.

Under his contract agreement with Cagney-Montgomery Productions, Admiral Halsey would receive 10 percent of the profits from the motion picture. During a visit with his son, William F. Halsey III, in La Jolla, California, Admiral Halsey went to Camp Pendleton where The Gallant Hours was being filmed (pictured). William F. Halsey III later remarked that he was startled at how much James Cagney looked like his father did during World War II.

The voiceover narration technique Montgomery used was similar to what he had done in Lady in the Lake, although in that case the narration was in the first person. What is striking about the narrative in The Gallant Hours is the degree of detail provided to introduce both main and minor characters to the audience, even sometimes indicating the manner of their death in the near future. Also unusual is that both American and Japanese characters are treated in a neutral and evenhanded way. The production team used the services of three technical advisors in making the film – Captain Joseph U. Lademan, Captain Idris Monahan, and James T. Goto, who not only was the Japanese advisor but also portrayed Admiral Yamamoto in the film.

For James Cagney, The Gallant Hours was "a labor of love, a tribute to that wonderful man Admiral William F. 'Bull' Halsey" for himself and his friend Robert Montgomery. Cagney praised Montgomery because he "steered away from big battle scenes and roaring guns. We concentrated on Halsey himself, trying to convey some of the tension of high command" in the film. In researching his role as Halsey, Cagney interviewed many men who had served under him, including two interviews with the admiral but he found the role a difficult one, despite the physical similarities between the two men. Cagney was concerned that he not impose any of his usual acting mannerisms on the character of Halsey – on the other hand, despite having met his subject several times, he didn't try to imitate Halsey's mannerisms either. As Cagney biographer John McCabe noted, "The film would be utterly boring without Cagney's thoughtful performance. Nowhere in his career had he been called on to do so much by doing so little." The Gallant Hours was Cagney's last starring role in a dramatic film until 1981. Thereafter he starred in a comedy, One, Two, Three, in 1961, and appeared briefly in the historical drama Ragtime two decades later.

The Gallant Hours was filmed in black & white at Metro-Goldwyn-Mayer Studios in the spring of 1959, with some exterior scenes shot in San Diego. The film employed a new construction technique to make the interior battleship shots easier to move and light: the walls of sets were hung from overhead grids to enable them to swing in and out as needed. Working titles for the film were "Bull Halsey" and "The Admiral Halsey Story". The studio rented a four-engined Sikorsky VS-44A, N41881, named "Mother Goose", from Catalina Air Lines, Inc., and painted it in wartime camouflage to depict Halsey’s flight from Pearl Harbor to Noumea to take over command of forces in the South Pacific in a Consolidated PB2Y-1 Coronado. Although the studio had promised to repaint the flying boat after the production, this did not happen, and the airline had to restore the civilian livery itself.

The film had its world premiere in Washington, D.C., on May 13, 1960, sponsored by the Navy League, and was released generally on June 22, 1960, in New York City.

== Reception ==
Although not a major box-office success, The Gallant Hours was well received by film critics, with Bosley Crowther writing in his review for The New York Times:

Beirne Lay Jr. and Frank D. Gilroy have written a screen play so fully packed with biographical and historical data on Admiral Halsey and his opposite number in the Japanese fleet—and likewise so loaded with characters whose names ring heroic bells—that anyone at all interested in the haunting record of the early days of the war in the South Pacific must see this film.

Even though Mr. Montgomery has bravely put it upon the screen in a calm, unhurried fashion that belies the usual slambang of war, and may very well irritate the patron who is looking for more explosive things, it comes out in his adroit direction as drama of intense restraint and power.

But more than a documentation, more than a drama of what went on within the cabin of Admiral Halsey in one of the most perilous phases of the war, this film is a brilliant tribute to the gallantry of the admiral himself, thanks in large measure to the performance of James Cagney in the role.

Crowther also singled out Dennis Weaver, Ward Costello, and James T. Goto for their performances. Biographer John McCabe also praised Cagney's portrayal:

There are few actors who can make nonvocal thought meaningful and interesting. Cagney does so by the great actor's technique of actually thinking the necessary thoughts and letting them register naturally and unaffectedly on his features, opening himself up to these thoughts and these alone. Toward the end of The Gallant Hours, when he is increasingly alone in his command center, his acting becomes almost pure thought.

In a contemporary 1960 review, TV Guide gave The Gallant Hours a three-star rating, noting: "James Cagney was the perfect choice to play Admiral Halsey." It also praised Robert Montgomery's direction that "focuses on the human side of the war, taking the time to show the inner workings of a great leader. The going is a little slow for what was thought to be a 'war' movie, but it is this leisurely pace that makes the film all the more believable."

In her 2019 film history book World War II at the Movies, author Virginia Lyman Lucas called The Gallant Hours a "wonderfully informative, authentic semidocumentatary film" that was "chock-full of facts, logistics, and strategies and is sparse in combat action" but "fascinating and mesmerizing mostly due to the magnificent portrayal of Admiral Halsey by James Cagney."

== Historical accuracy ==
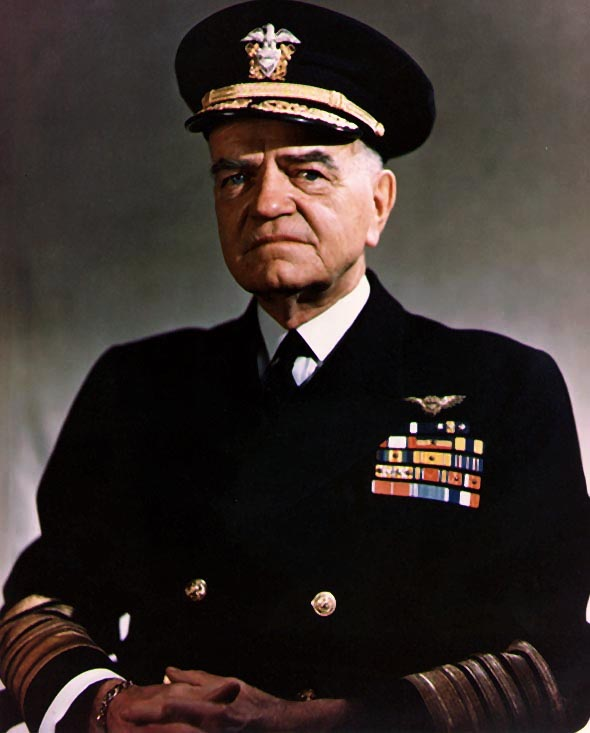
Admiral W.F.Halsey

The producers went to great lengths to interview staff members who had worked with Admiral Halsey during World War II, including two interviews with the admiral himself by James Cagney, during the preproduction research for The Gallant Hours. Cagney's dignified portrayal may have softened Halsey's often salty, pugnacious personality. For example, when he received his orders to assume command of the South Pacific forces, Admiral Halsey's response was: "Jesus Christ and General Jackson! This is the hottest potato they ever handed me!" Also, there was one aspect of Halsey's personality neither the script nor Cagney touched on in any way: that of his reputation as a "sea dog", with "a girl in every port". Halsey's nickname "Bull" was supposedly conferred on him by his fellow officers, not for his toughness in combat, but for his off-duty exploits ashore.

The action of the film takes place over a five-week period, between October 8, 1942, and December 1, 1942. For dramatic effect, the April 18, 1943, death of Admiral Yamamoto some five months after the film's time period, was portrayed as being during the struggle for Guadalcanal. The Japanese diplomatic code, Purple, was broken in 1940. Their naval code, JN-25, was broken in 1942, prior to the Battle of Midway, which was in June 1942. This film makes it look like JN-25 was broken during the time of the film, Oct-Nov 1942.

Due to a lack of Grumman F4F Wildcat fighters at the time of filming, the similar looking, somewhat larger Grumman F6F Hellcat, which was not yet available at the time, was substituted in one scene.

== Legacy ==
The oil portrait of Cagney that hangs in New York City's Players Club, of which he was a member, depicts him as Halsey in this film.

== Home media ==
The Gallant Hours was released on VHS in 1992, but not on laserdisc. A DVD version is available. Kino has released a Blu-ray version.

== See also ==
- List of American films of 1960
- Guadalcanal Campaign (August 7, 1942 – February 7, 1943)
  - Battle of the Santa Cruz Islands (October 25–27, 1942)
  - Naval Battle of Guadalcanal (November 12–15, 1942)
- Death of Isoroku Yamamoto (April 18, 1943)
