= Frederic Gehring =

Frederic P. Gehring, C.M. (20 January 1903 – 26 April 1998) was an American Catholic priest who served as a military chaplain during the Guadalcanal Campaign of World War II. As well as serving as a parish priest, he was also for a time the National Chaplain for the Catholic War Veterans and the 1st Marine Division Association.

== Life ==
Gehring was born in Brooklyn, New York, and as a young man was admitted to the Congregation of the Mission, more commonly called the Vincentian Fathers. He entered the Congregation at St. Vincent's Seminary in Germantown, Philadelphia, their house of formation. A few years after his ordination as a priest in 1930, he was assigned to the Congregation's missions in China, where he was made responsible for running orphanages for Chinese children. He served in China for six years, returning in 1939.

Gehring volunteered as a Navy chaplain on December 9, 1941, two days after the attack on Pearl Harbor. His role as padre during the Guadalcanal Campaign was depicted by actor Richard Carlyle in the movie The Gallant Hours. Gehring was the first US Naval chaplain decorated with the Presidential Legion of Merit for conspicuous gallantry. The citation read:

for exceptionally meritorious conduct in the performance of outstanding services... during the early months of the campaign against enemy Japanese forces on Guadalcanal... from September 26, 1942... Voluntarily making three hazardous expeditions through enemy-occupied territory, Chaplain Gehring, aided by native scouts, evacuated missionaries trapped on the island. In addition to his routine duties, he frequently visited the front lines and was a constant source of encouragement to the Marine and Army units under continual attack by the enemy. Brave under fire, cheerful in the face of discouragement, and tireless in his devotion to duty, Chaplain Gehring lifted the morale of our men to an exceptional degree. By his fine leadership and great courage he inspired all with whom he came in contact.

In addition to the Legion of Merit, Gehring was awarded the Navy and Marine Corps Medal, and the US Marine Corps Presidential Unit Citation.

Gehring's familiarity with the island led to his acting as driver for Admiral Halsey during the Admiral's visit to Guadalcanal. His skill with the violin helped to entertain the troops.

After World War II, Gehring continued working as a priest, returning to Germantown in 1963, where he served as pastor of St. Vincent's Church. He retired from that position five years before his death, to live with his sister in Orlando, Florida. His funeral was at St. Vincent's Seminary in Germantown, where in 1930 he had been ordained.

== Patsy Li ==
While on Guadalcanal, Gehring discovered a six-year-old girl, who had been beaten and bayonetted, and was also suffering from malaria. Gehring nursed the child back to life, and named her Patsy Li. She was adopted by a Singaporean woman, who believed the child to be her own daughter of the same name, who had been lost at sea. Later, the child was proved beyond doubt to be the woman's own daughter. In 1950, Gehring brought Patsy Li to the United States, where she became a nurse. He wrote her story in the 1962 book A Child of Miracles.

== See also ==
- Roman Catholic Archdiocese for the Military Services, USA#World War II
- Barney Ross
