= Jigsaw (1949 film) =

1949 film noir by Fletcher Markle

- Theatrical release poster
- Directed by: Fletcher Markle
- Screenplay by: Fletcher Markle; Vincent McConnor
- Story by: John Roeburt
- Produced by: Edward J. Danziger; Harry Lee Danziger
- Starring: Franchot Tone; Jean Wallace; Marc Lawrence
- Cinematography: Don Malkames
- Edited by: Robert Matthews
- Music by: Robert W. Stringer
- Production company: Tower Pictures
- Distributed by: United Artists
- Release dates: March 11, 1949 (United States); May 28, 1949 (New York City)
- Running time: 72 minutes
- Country: United States
- Language: English
- Budget: $400,000

Jigsaw is a 1949 American film noir crime drama directed by Fletcher Markle starring Franchot Tone, Jean Wallace and Marc Lawrence. The feature was produced by the Danziger Brothers, Edward J. Danziger and Harry Lee Danziger from a screenplay by Vincent McConnor and Fletcher Markle, which was based on a story by John Roeburt.

The film features cameo appearances by Marlene Dietrich, Henry Fonda, John Garfield, Burgess Meredith, Marsha Hunt, Doe Avedon, Everett Sloane, newspaper columnist Leonard Lyons and the film's director, Fletcher Markle.

== Plot ==
The murder of a print shop owner is quickly labeled a suicide. However, newspaper columnist Charlie Riggs is convinced that it was a murder related to a white neofascist organization called the Crusaders and relays this suspicion to assistant district attorney Howard Malloy. Riggs also publishes his opinion in his column.

Riggs is murdered, inducing Malloy to launch an investigation into the Crusaders. The group appears to be backed by organized crime, and Malloy receives unsolicited help from a crime boss named Angel, who recommends him for the position of special prosecutor.

Later, with further help from a prominent judge's widow, Malloy is appointed, and the criminals think that he is in their pocket. However, Malloy proceeds to investigate the artist who created the Crusaders' recruiting poster and sees a painting of an attractive night club singer, so Malloy investigates her. After a series of revelations, a fiery exchange takes place.

== Cast ==
- Franchot Tone as Howard Malloy
- Jean Wallace as Barbara Whitfield
- Myron McCormick as Charles Riggs
- Marc Lawrence as Angelo Agostini
- Winifred Lenihan as Mrs. Hartley
- Doe Avedon as Caroline Riggs
- Hedley Rainnie as Sigmund Kosterich
- Walter Vaughan as District Attorney Walker
- George Breen as Knuckles
- Robert Gist as Tommy Quigley
- Hester Sondergaard as Mrs. Borg
- Luella Gear as Pet Shop Owner
- Henry Fonda as Nightclub Waiter
- Alexander Campbell as Pemberton
- Robert Noe as Waldron
- Alexander Lockwood as Nichols
- Ken Smith as Wylie
- Alan MacAteer as Museum Guard
- Manuel Aparicio as Warehouse Guard
- Brainerd Duffield as Butler

== Reception ==
In a contemporary review for The New York Times, critic Bosley Crowther wrote: "It is sluggishly directed by Fletcher Markle, who also co-authored the script, and almost indifferently played, where good playing would do the most for it, by Franchot Tone in the principal role ... An irresistible temptation to get a few recognizable stars to play bit roles in the picture was accepted unfortunately. John Garfield is seen as a loafer, Henry Fonda as a waiter in a club, Burgess Meredith as a bartender, Marcia Hunt as a secretary and such. This tomfooling doesn't help the picture. It gives the whole thing a faintly prankish look."

Critic Philip K. Scheuer of the Los Angeles Times wrote: "'Jigsaw,' produced by Franchot Tone and associates in New York in attempted semidocumentary style, strikes me as a dilettante effort at movie making. The boys seem to have gotten hold of a camera and decided to play around with it. This is too bad, because they also chose a serious subject—the spreading of racial intolerance—and then muddled it up almost hopelessly."
