= Telescope (TV series) =

Canadian documentary series

- Presented by: Fletcher Markle (1963−1969); Ken Cavanaugh (1970−1973)
- Narrated by: Fletcher Markle
- Country of origin: Canada

Production
- Executive producers: Thom Berson (1963−1970); Fletcher Markle (1970−1973)
- Producers: Ross McLean (1963−1964); Peter Kelly (1964−1966); Fletcher Markle (1966−1969); Sam Levene (1970−1973)
- Running time: 22 minutes (30 min with commercials)

Original release
- Network: CBC Television
- Release: 1963 – 1973

Telescope is a Canadian documentary series that aired on CBC Television between 1963 and 1973. The series was hosted by Fletcher Markle, which profiled notable Canadian people from celebrities to the unknown, who made a difference.

Starting in September 1966, Telescope was the first regular colour broadcast in Canada. Its producer was Sam Levene.

In 2008, CBC offered 10 episodes of Telescope on their Digital Archives website. The episodes are from the 1970–71 season, and feature new host Ken Kavanagh. Among those profiled were game show host Monty Hall, publisher Mel Hurtig, journalist Pat Carney, actor John Vernon, author Farley Mowat, amusement park impresario Patty Conklin, and underwater explorer Joe MacInnis. A 1970 episode featured actor Donald Sutherland including early footage of his son Kiefer. Mentalist Uri Geller followed a week later by Ray Hyman and Jerry Andrus who explained and duplicated Geller's "paranormal" feats. First Nations filmmaker Alanis Obomsawin has stated that it was an interview with her on Telescope in the early 1960s that first brought her to the attention of the National Film Board of Canada.
