= Anne Burr =

American actress (1918–2003)

- Born: June 10, 1918; Boston, Massachusetts, United States
- Died: February 1, 2003 (aged 84); Old Lyme, Connecticut, United States
- Occupation: Actress

Anne Burr McDermott (born Anne Elizabeth Burr; June 10, 1918 - February 1, 2003) was an American actress who appeared on the stage, and in television, radio, and film in the 1940s and 1950s. She made her Broadway debut in Orson Welles's Native Son in 1941, and appeared with frequency on the New York stage through 1952. She appeared in several minor roles in films, beginning with the parts of Ruth in Child of Divorce (1946) and Judy Clark in The Devil on Wheels (1947). In 1947, she portrayed Viola in the first unabridged televised production of William Shakespeare's Twelfth Night. She became one of the world's first soap opera stars, first appearing in the earliest years of that genre as Dr. Eve Allen, one of the first women doctors portrayed on television, in The Greatest Gift (1954-1955). She was an original cast member of As the World Turns, starring as Claire from 1956 until 1959, when she retired from acting.

== Early life and education ==
Born in Boston on June 10, 1918, Anne Burr was the daughter of Eugene Palmer Burr and Helen Isabel Burr (née Cummings). Her mother was born and raised in Weymouth, Massachusetts, and worked as a registered nurse. Her father was born in Columbus, Ohio, and he graduated from Princeton University in 1901. After working for several businesses in the United States and England, he ultimately became an executive with the Meadow River Lumber Company, where he finished his career.

When Anne was seven years old, the Burr family moved to Hampstead, London. There, she was a student at the Threave House School from 1925 through 1929. The family briefly lived in Columbus, Ohio, and Anne attended the Columbus School for Girls for the 1929-1930 school year. The Burr family then resided in Hartford, Connecticut, where they lived at a house on Prospect Ave. Anne graduated from West Middle School Hartford on June 17, 1931. Her parents resided in Hartford until 1948, when they moved to Old Lyme, Connecticut, remaining there for the remainder of their lives.

Anne spent her high-school years at Oxford School in Hartford, where she acted in plays staged by the Oxford School Association, beginning with a performance of Mary Gilbertson's adaptation of the French Christmas story The Legend of the Crèche, which was performed in December 1931. In 1935, she starred in a production of Clyde Fitch's Beau Brummell at the school, and in the 1935-1936 school year, she was president of Oxford's Paint and Putty Club, the school group responsible for putting on Oxford's plays and providing art opportunities to students. She was one of 16 students who graduated from Oxford on June 5, 1936.

In the autumn of 1936, Burr began her college education at Sweet Briar College in Virginia, where she was a member of the student dramatic association. In her freshman year, she starred in a stage adaptation of Robert Louis Stevenson's short story "The Sire de Maletroit's Door" (1936). Other plays in which she starred at that school included the role of Jane in a stage adaptation of Jane Austen's Pride and Prejudice (1937), and Moon Blossom in John Masefield's A King's Daughter (1938). At Sweet Briar she studied drama under professor Cameron King. In 1939, she moved to New York City to pursue further studies in drama.

== Career ==
Burr began her professional career as an actress as a member of the Farragut Players in Rye Beach, New Hampshire; sje made her debut with the company as Isla in Edgar Wallace's Criminal At Large with Alison Skipworth as Lady Lebanon on July 9, 1940. Later in the season, she portrayed Mrs. Albert Davidson in John Colton and Clemence Randolph's Rain, a work which also starred Burr's future husband, actor Walter Coy, in the role of Reverend Davidson. That season, she also portrayed Meg March in Marian de Forest's stage adaptation of Louisa May Alcott's Little Women with Frances Farmer as Jo March. She made her Broadway debut in 1941 in Orson Welles's Native Son. She went on to appear in numerous Broadway productions through the 1940s, including Detective Story and The Hasty Heart.

On radio, she appeared as Regina Rawlings on Backstage Wife from 1948 until 1949, and once her character was written out of the series, she returned again in a similar role as Claudia Vincent. She routinely had roles in such serials as Big Sister, Wendy Warren and the News, and When a Girl Marries. From 1951 until 1958, she was Kate Morrow on the weekly drama City Hospital, reprising the part on the television series from 1952 until 1953. She frequently appeared on Studio One with Fletcher Markle from 1947 until 1948, and from time to time performed parts on other series, such as Mr. Keen, Tracer of Lost Persons and Scotland Yard.

On television, Burr was an original cast member on the soap operas The Greatest Gift, where she played Dr. Eve Allen, one of the first female television doctors, and As the World Turns, where she originated the role of Claire English, a role she played from 1956 to 1959. Burr also had roles on The Philco Television Playhouse, Studio One, and Suspense.

Burr was briefly blacklisted during the Red Scare, but was nevertheless able to return to television soon thereafter.

In 1959, following her departure from As the World Turns, she moved to Los Angeles and retired from acting.

== Personal life ==
In 1939, Burr dated actor Efrem Zimbalist Jr. On March 26, 1942, she married actor Walter Coy at Marble Collegiate Church in Manhattan. Their marriage ended in divorce. On June 21, 1953, she married her second husband, Tom McDermott, a principal in Four Star Television, in Old Lyme, Connecticut.

== Death ==
Burr died in Old Lyme in 2003 of respiratory failure; her husband had predeceased her in 1990.
