= Homer Jones (politician) =

American politician (1893–1970)

Homer R. Jones
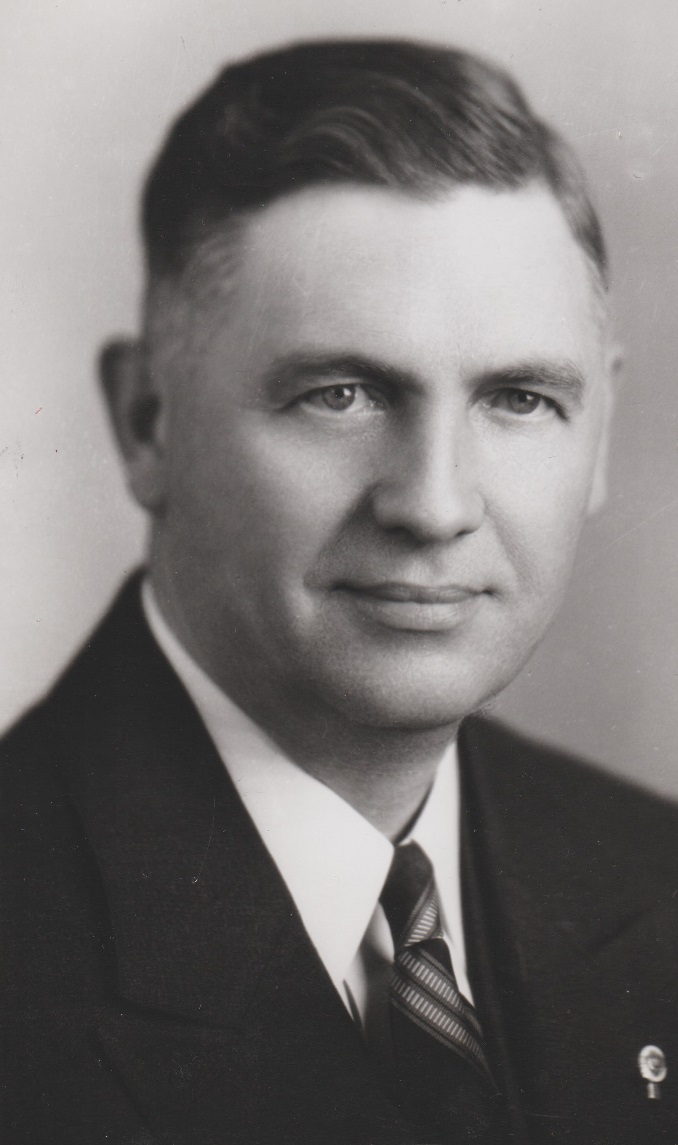
- News service photo from Jones' unsuccessful 1944 campaign for Washington State Treasurer

Member of the U.S. House of Representatives from Washington's 1st district
- In office January 3, 1947 – January 3, 1949
- Preceded by: Hugh De Lacy
- Succeeded by: Hugh Mitchell

Personal details
- Born: Homer Raymond Jones; September 3, 1893 Martinsburg, Missouri, U.S.
- Died: November 26, 1970 (aged 77) Bremerton, Washington, U.S.
- Party: Republican

Homer Raymond Jones (September 3, 1893 – November 26, 1970) was an American politician and government official. He served as a member of the United States House of Representatives from 1947 to 1949, representing the First Congressional District of Washington as a Republican.

== Biography ==
Jones was born in Martinsburg, Missouri on September 3, 1893, and his family moved to Bremerton, Washington in 1901. He attended the public schools of Bremerton and studied business administration at Seattle Business College. During World War I he served in the United States Navy, enlisting in 1917, and remaining in uniform until his 1919 discharge.

After the war, Jones was employed as a sheet metal worker at the Bremerton Navy Yard. A resident of Charleston, Washington, he served on the city council from 1922 to 1924, and as mayor from 1924 to 1927. (Charleston was consolidated with Bremerton in 1927.) Jones was Kitsap County Treasurer from 1926 to 1929, and Assistant Washington State Treasurer from 1929 to 1933. From 1933 to 1937, Jones was treasurer of Bremerton, and he served as Bremerton's mayor from 1939 to 1941.

Jones served as state commander of the American Legion from 1934 to 1935. He received a commission in the United States Navy Reserve and was ordered to active duty for World War II; he served until the end of the war as a public affairs officer for the 13th Naval District, which was headquartered in Seattle. He was discharged as a captain in 1946, and his awards and decorations included the Bronze Star Medal.

Jones was the unsuccessful Republican nominee for Washington State Treasurer four times from 1932 to 1944. In 1946, he was elected as a Republican to the 80th Congress (January 3, 1947 – January 3, 1949), defeating a one-term Democrat, who was tarred with communism. Jones was an unsuccessful candidate for reelection in 1948 against a more conventionally leftist Democrat; Jones’ vote share dropped from 64% to 47%. His one-term was successful in enacting two bills affecting civil servants. From 1949 to 1955, he was superintendent of the Washington State Veterans' Home in Retsil, and he served again as Assistant State Treasurer from 1953 to 1957. In 1956 he made another unsuccessful run for State Treasurer.

Jones died in Bremerton on November 26, 1970, and was buried at Woodlawn Cemetery in Bremerton.

Homer R. Jones Drive in Bremerton is named for him.

U.S. House of Representatives
Preceded by Hugh De Lacy	Member of the U.S. House of Representatives from Washington's 1st congressional district January 3, 1947 – January 3, 1949	Succeeded by Hugh Mitchell
