= The Greatest Gift (TV series) =

American television series

The Greatest Gift is an American TV daytime soap opera on NBC that ran between 1954 and 1955, featuring Ward Costello, Anne Meara and Jack Klugman as Jim Hanson. Dr. Eve Allen, played by Anne Burr, was one of the first TV women doctors. One of the last storylines before cancellation was a couple adopting a black-market baby.

== Cast ==
The cast included:

- Anne Burr: Eve Allen
- Philip Foster: Phil Stone
- Athena Lorde: Betty Matthews
- Will Hare: Harold Matthews (1954–1955)
- Martin Balsam: Harold Matthews (1955)
- Gene Peterson: Ned Blackman (1954–1955)
- Ward Costello: Ned Blackman (1955)
- Jack Klugman: Jim Hanson
- Josef Drake: Sam Blake
- Henry Barnard: Peter Blake
- Helen Warren: Mrs. Blake
- Margaret Heneghan: Peg
- Anne Meara: Harriet (1954–1955)
