= Hugh De Lacy (politician) =

American politician (1910–1986)

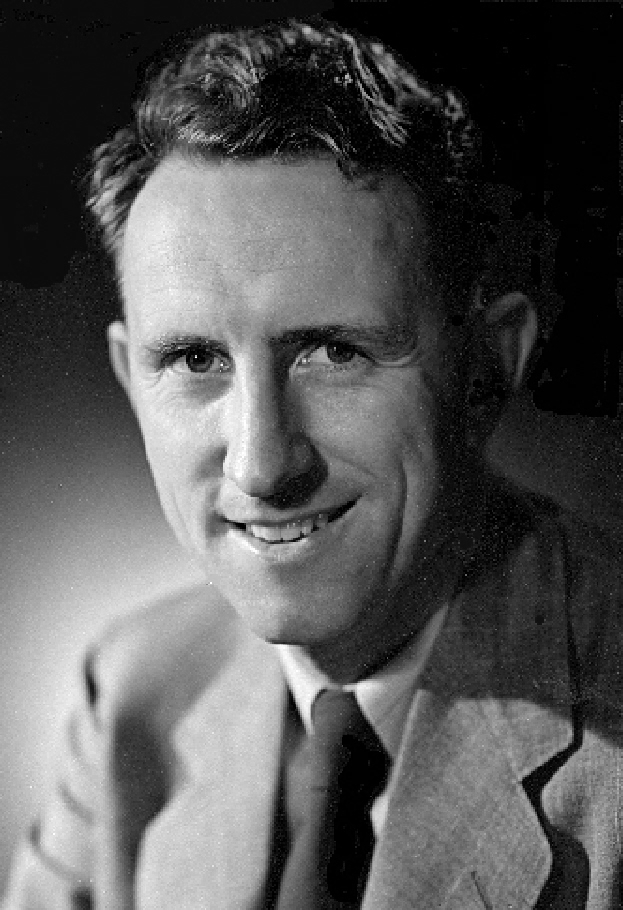
- De Lacy c. 1946

Member of the U.S. House of Representatives from Washington's 1st district
- In office January 3, 1945 – January 3, 1947
- Preceded by: Warren G. Magnuson
- Succeeded by: Homer R. Jones

Member of the Seattle City Council
- In office June 7, 1937 – May 28, 1940
- Preceded by: Multi-member district
- Succeeded by: Multi-member district

Personal details
- Born: Emerson Hugh De Lacy; May 9, 1910 Seattle, Washington, U.S.
- Died: August 19, 1986 (aged 76) Soquel, California, U.S.
- Party: Democratic
- Other political affiliations: Communist (secretly)
- Spouse: Betty Jorgensen (div. 1947) Hester Sondergaard (m. 1949; div. 1960) Dorothy Baskin (m. 1960)
- Children: 4

Emerson Hugh De Lacy (May 9, 1910 – August 19, 1986) was an American politician and socialist. He served on the Seattle City Council from 1937 to 1940 and as a member of the United States House of Representatives from 1945 to 1947. He represented the First Congressional District of Washington as a Democrat.

== Early years ==
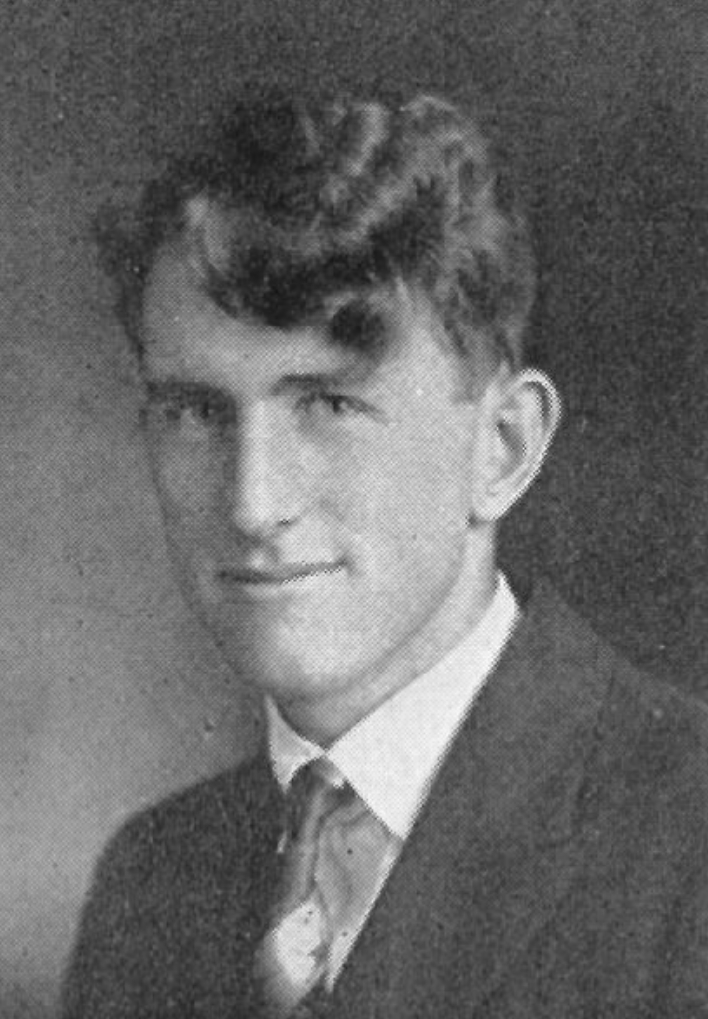
De Lacy in the University of Washington yearbook, 1929

De Lacy was born in Seattle, Washington, and educated in the public schools of the Queen Anne section of Seattle. He graduated from the University of Washington with a master of arts degree in 1932.

== Career ==
From 1933 to 1937, De Lacy taught English at the University of Washington. He was among the professors accused of "Communistic attitudes" and was dismissed after a student, Thane Summers, volunteered in the Spanish Civil War and died in Spain. De Lacy was accused of encouraging students to fight for the Spanish Republicans.

De Lacy was elected to the Seattle City Council in 1937. He was subsequently elected as president of the Washington Commonwealth Federation, a left-wing faction within the Washington State Democratic Party that included a number of members of the Communist Party USA. He was re-elected and served on Seattle City Council until 1940.

As a congressman, De Lacy often expressed controversial views that earned him a reputation of a Communist fellow traveller. He attacked Patrick J. Hurley for his support of Chiang Kai-Shek instead of supporting "the dynamic new democracy represented by the Chinese Communist Party". He was the only Washington delegate at the 1940 Democratic National Convention to oppose the re-nomination of President Roosevelt, calling him a "warmonger". De Lacy spoke against conscription in 1940, but backed down and called for extending the draft in reaction to Operation Barbarossa in 1941. He also spoke in defense of prosecuted Communists such as Earl Browder and Harry Bridges.

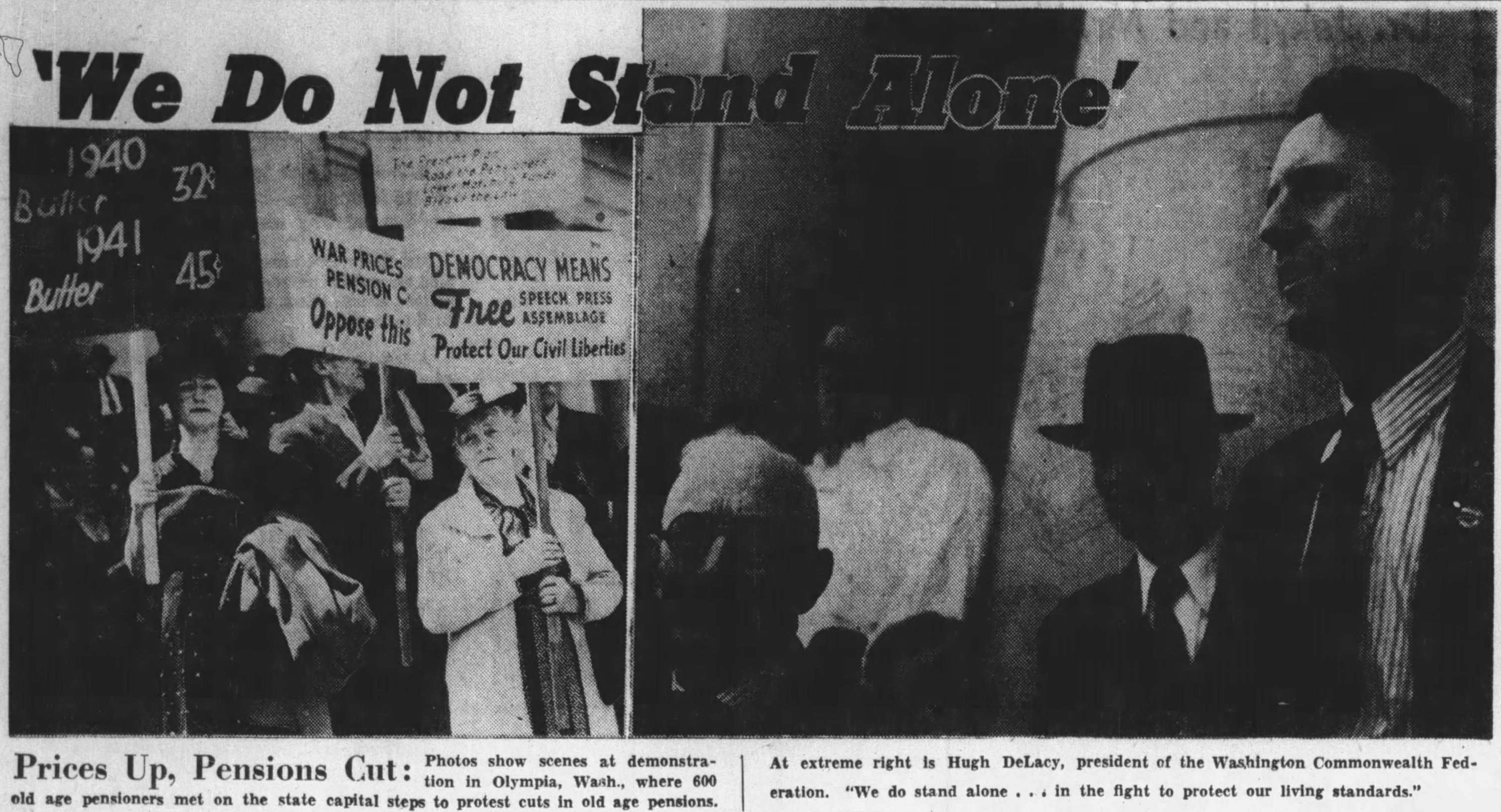
De Lacy (far right) in a clipping from the Daily Worker, May 29, 1941

Louis Budenz named De Lacy as a covert Communist in 1948. According to historian of American Communism Harvey Klehr, De Lacy was a secret member of the Communist Party USA at the time of his 1937 election.

De Lacy's party membership was first publicly confirmed by the former Executive Secretary of the Washington Commonwealth Federation, Howard Costigan, who declared in sworn testimony delivered to the House Un-American Activities Committee in 1954 that he had sat with De Lacy on the governing bureau of the Seattle district of the CPUSA from 1937 to 1939.

De Lacy was elected to the United States Congress in 1944, replacing fellow Democrat Warren G. Magnuson who had retired from the House to run (successfully) for United States Senate. Harvey Klehr noted that by 1944, De Lacy moderated his political views and became "once more a loyal New Dealer and won election to Congress for one term". De Lacy was defeated by Republican Homer Jones in the 1946 election.

In 1947, De Lacy became editor of the Bulletin of the Machinists' Union in Seattle. From 1948 to 1950, he was state director of the Progressive Party of Ohio and was active in the 1948 presidential campaign of Henry Wallace. He became a carpenter in 1951, and in 1960 he became a general building contractor. He retired from that role in 1967.

De Lacy and his Washington Commonwealth Federation held monthly community fundraisers they called hootenannies. They introduced folk singers Woody Guthrie, and Pete Seeger to the word when they came to visit Seattle in 1941, who went on to popularize it as term for a folk music jam.

== Personal life ==
On October 24, 1947, De Lacy was divorced from Betty Jorgensen. In 1949, De Lacy married actress Hester Sondergaard; that marriage also ended in divorce. His third wife was Dorothy Baskin to whom he was married to from 1960 until his death. He had four daughters from his first marriage.

== Death ==
On August 19, 1986, De Lacy died in Soquel, California after battling cancer for four years. He was buried in Home of Peace Cemetery in Santa Cruz, California.

U.S. House of Representatives
Preceded by Warren G. Magnuson	Member of the U.S. House of Representatives from Washington's 1st congressional district 1945–1947	Succeeded by Homer Jones
