= Hester Sondergaard =

American actress (1903–1994)

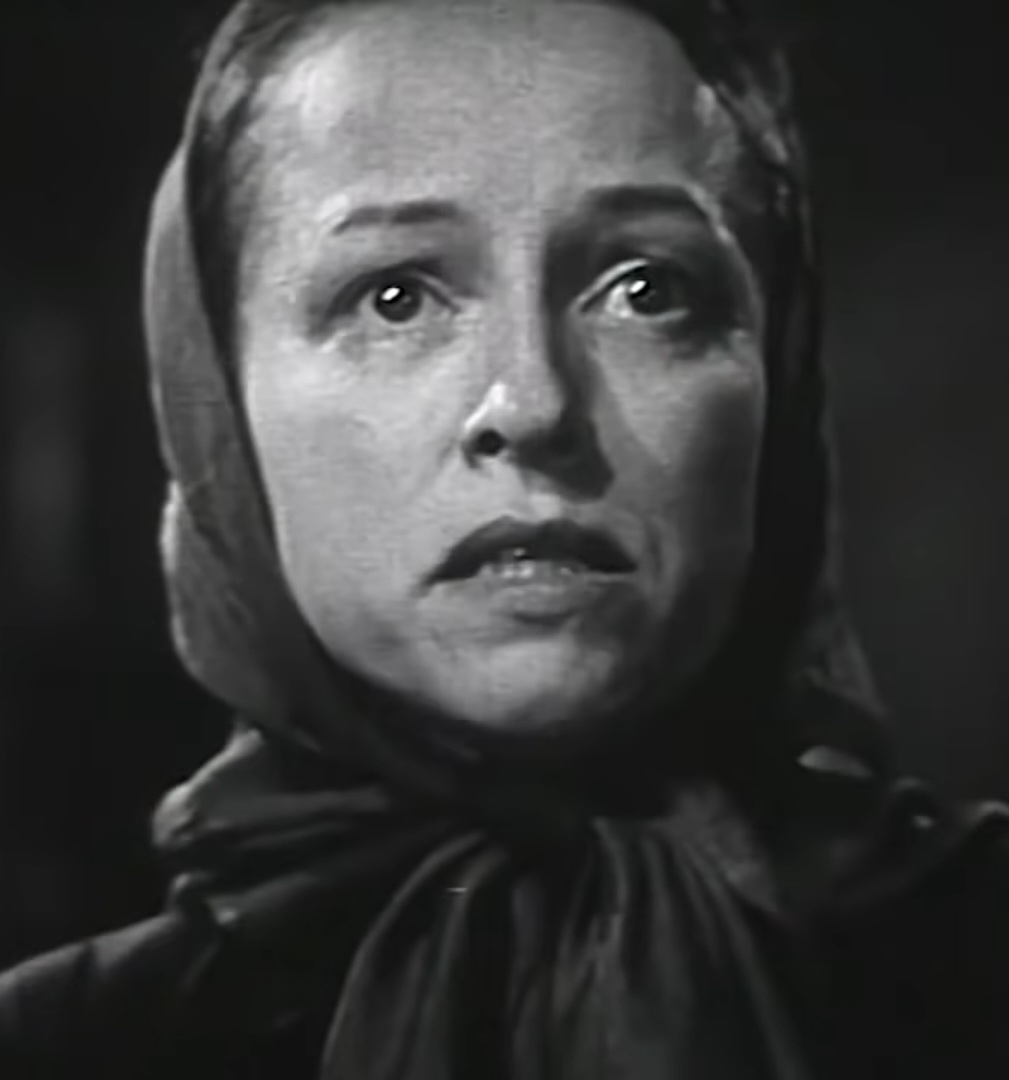
- Sondergaard in Jigsaw (1949)
- Born: July 5, 1903; Litchfield, Minnesota, U.S.
- Died: February 26, 1994 (aged 90); Los Angeles County, California, U.S.
- Education: University of Minnesota
- Occupation: Actress
- Known for: Portia Faces Life; Jigsaw
- Spouse: Hugh De Lacy (after 1949)
- Relatives: Gale Sondergaard (sister)

Hester Sondergaard (July 5, 1903 – February 26, 1994) was an American actress.

== Early years ==
Born in Litchfield, Minnesota, Sondergaard was the daughter of Hans T. Søndergaard, a dairy instructor at a university, and the sister of actress Gale Sondergaard. When she was a child, she played violin with Midwestern Chautauqua companies. She attended the University of Minnesota, where she was active in productions of the Masquers Club.

== Career ==
Sondergaard's first professional speaking part came in 1924. After college, she acted with the Wisconsin Players and in venues that included the Civic Repertory Theater in New York. Her Broadway credits include Galileo (1947), My Heart's in the Highlands (1939), Marching Song (1937), Bitter Stream (1936), Mother (1935), and Black Pit (1935).

On radio, Sondergaard was an organizer of The American School of the Air. She also acted on Portia Faces Life, Road of Life, Wendy Warren and the News, and We Love and Learn. An article in the December 1949 issue of Radio and Television Mirror magazine described Sondergaard as having "one of the largest repertories [sic] of dialects of any actress", being able to sound authentic in roles using any of 11 accents.

Sondergaard taught dramatics at the Dramatic School of New York.

== Personal life ==
In 1949, Sondergaard married politician Hugh De Lacy.
