= Alexander Lockwood =

American actor

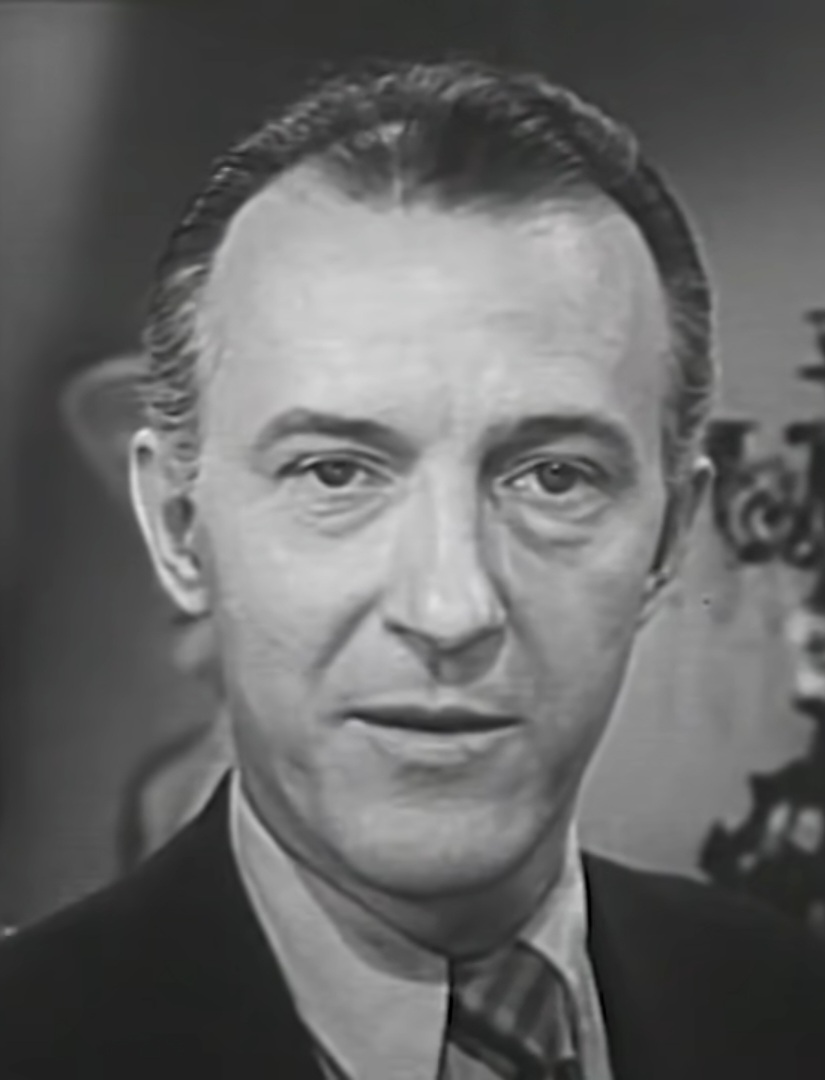
- Lockwood in Jigsaw (1949)
- Born: Alexander Wyricz; May 5, 1902; Slezská Ostrava, Silesia, Austria-Hungary
- Died: January 25, 1990 (aged 87); Los Angeles, California, U.S.
- Occupation: Actor
- Years active: 1938–1983

Alexander Lockwood (born Alexander Wyricz; May 5, 1902 – January 25, 1990) was an American actor. He appeared in numerous films and television shows throughout the 1930s to the 1980s.

== Biography ==
Lockwood was born Alexander Wyricz in Poland on May 5, 1902. He came to the United States when he was 4 years old. His parents lived in Chicago, and he had two sisters.

=== Film ===
Lockwood began his acting career in film in 1938, appearing in films like Just Off Broadway, Sherlock Holmes in Washington and Jigsaw during the 1940s. During the 1950s and 1960s he appeared in films like The Wrong Man and The Invisible Boy with Richard Eyer. He also appeared in The Story of Mankind and Monster on the Campus. He also acted in films like The Tarnished Angels and Edge of Eternitywith Cornel Wilde and Cary Grant during the late 1950s. During the 1960s he appeared in films like Beauty and the Beast with Joyce Taylor and Walk on the Wild Side with Laurence Harvey and The Monkey's Uncle with Tommy Kirk during the 1960s. During the 1970s he appeared in films like Duel, Family Plot and Close Encounters of the Third Kind. Lockwood last acted in the film Romantic Comedy in 1983.

=== Stage ===
When Lockwood was with the Olive Meehan-Cecil W. Secrest Associate Players in Sioux City in 1926, he was described as "Another handsome juvenile ... not only a clever dramatic actor, but possesses a splendid singing voice." He performed with the Clemant-Walsh troupe in 1927. In 1928 he was the leading man in a stock theater company in Fond du Lac, Wisconsin. His Broadway debut occurred in 1938 in Soliloquy. His other Broadway credits included Hamlet (1945 and 1946), The Biggest Thief in Town (1949), and Remains to Be Seen (1952).

== Personal life and death ==
Lockwood and dancer Hester Duffield obtained a marriage license on May 22, 1928. He died in 1990 at the age of 87.

== Selected filmography ==
=== Film ===
- Angels with Dirty Faces (1938) - Reporter (uncredited)
- Wings of the Navy (1939) - Jerry's Flight Instructor (uncredited)
- Murder in the Air (1940) - Dirigible Officer (uncredited)
- Flight from Destiny (1941) - Conway
- Dive Bomber (1941) - Squadron Commander (uncredited)
- Dick Tracy vs. Crime, Inc. (1941) - Smith (uncredited)
- The Bugle Sounds (1942) - Sergeant (uncredited)
- Mississippi Gambler (1942) - Spence
- Saboteur (1942) - Marine (uncredited)
- Just Off Broadway (1942) - Edmond Telmachio
- Madame Spy (1942) - Cab Driver (uncredited)
- Sherlock Holmes in Washington (1943) - Reporter (uncredited)
- Jigsaw (1949) - Nichols
- With These Hands (1950) - Doctor (in 1913) (uncredited)
- The Tattered Dress (1957) - Paul Vernon
- The Invisible Boy (1957) - Arthur Kelvaney
- Hell Canyon Outlaws (1957) - Bert, the New Sheriff
- The Story of Mankind (1957) - Promoter
- The Tarnished Angels (1957) - Sam Hagood
- Run Silent, Run Deep (1958) - Minor Role (uncredited)
- Too Much, Too Soon (1958) - Alfred (uncredited)
- King Creole (1958) - Dr. Patrick (uncredited)
- Monster on the Campus (1958) - Professor Gilbert Howard
- This Earth Is Mine (1959) - Dr. Regis (uncredited)
- North by Northwest (1959) - Judge Anson B. Flynn (uncredited)
- Edge of Eternity (1959) - Jim Kendon
- Walk on the Wild Side (1962) - Doctor in Teresina's Café (uncredited)
- 13 West Street (1962) - Schaffer (uncredited)
- Beauty and the Beast (1962) - Man
- The Monkey's Uncle (1965) - Regent
- The Ballad of Josie (1967) - Parson (uncredited)
- Duel (1971) - Old Man in Car
- The Sting (1973) - Landlord (uncredited)
- Family Plot (1976) - Parson
- Close Encounters of the Third Kind (1977) - Implantee #2
- Wholly Moses! (1980) - Elderly Man
- Making Love (1982) - Minister
- Romantic Comedy (1983) - The Minister

=== Television ===
- Tales of Tomorrow (1952) (Season 1 Episode 40: "The Duplicates") - Dr. Gorham
- Gunsmoke (1956) (Season 2 Episode 6: "Indian White") - Colonel Honeyman
- Telephone Time (1956) (Season 2 Episode 1: "Keeley's Wonderful Machine")
- Telephone Time (1956) (Season 2 Episode 7: "Hatfield, the Rainmaker") - Councilman Martin
- The Ford Television Theatre (1957) (Season 5 Episode 31: "Strange Disappearance") - District Attorney
- Sheriff of Cochise (1957) (Season 1 Episode 45: "Wyatt Earp") - Inspector Boland
- The Silent Service (1957) (Season 1 Episode 31: "The Sealion Story") - War Correspondent Howard
- Zane Grey Theater (1957) (Season 2 Episode 2: "Blood in the Dust") - Lacey
- Startime (1960) (Season 1 Episode 27: "Incident at a Corner") - Principal Rigsby
- Alfred Hitchcock Presents (1961) (Season 6 Episode 32: "Self Defense") - Henry Willett
- Alfred Hitchcock Presents (1961) (Season 6 Episode 37: "Make My Death Bed") - Police Officer
- The Law and Mr. Jones (1961) (Season 1 Episode 26: "A Fool for a Client")
- Window on Main Street (1961) (Season 1 Episode 8: "The Big Spender") – Ethan Carter
- The Alfred Hitchcock Hour (1962) (Season 1 Episode 10: "Day of Reckoning) - Dr. Campbell, the Psychiatrist
- Gunsmoke (1962) (Season 7 Episode 25: "The Widow") - Colonel
- My Three Sons (1962) (Season 2 Episode 35: "The Hippopotamus Foot") – "Dean" Talbot
- It's a Man's World (1962) (Season 1 Episode 11: "Chicago Gains a Number") - Will Ryder
- Mr. Novak (1965) (Season 2 Episode 25: "Honor--and All That") - Collins
- Profiles in Courage (1965) (Season 1 Episode 21: "Grover Cleveland") - Congressman Mills
- The Cavanaughs (1988) (Season 2 Episode 8: "Strange Bedfellows") - Leo Lafferty (final appearance)
