= Ford Theater (radio series) =

American radio dramatic anthology series (1947–1949)

Ford Theater is an American dramatic anthology radio program that was broadcast on NBC October 5, 1947 - June 27, 1948, and on CBS October 8, 1948 - July 1, 1949. The name was sometimes written as Ford Theatre.

== Overview ==
The creation of Ford Theater provided "a prestige hour dramatic show" for NBC after it tried to obtain Lux Radio Theatre from CBS or Theatre Guild on the Air from ABC. Plans for the program called for broadcasts of "adaptations of great plays, classic motion pictures, best-selling novels, prize-winning short stories, and an occasional musical". Producers also planned to occasionally broadcast episodes of "outstanding original radio dramas of the past" and to present encore performances of the show's best-received episodes. One such repeat was Norman Corwin's We Hold These Truths, which was originally broadcast on CBS. In another case, the program repeated an episode of Mr. District Attorney, which was purportedly the first time a commercial network series had dealt with antisemitism. The award-winning script was expanded to an hour for the Ford broadcast.

Ford Theater competed with similar programs for programming as well as for audiences. Ford had planned to broadcast an adaptation of Miracle on 34th Street as its Christmas 1947 feature but had to air a different story after Lux obtained radio rights for the film. Confusion about the rights resulted from Ford's agency's negotiating with 20th Century-Fox's Eastern office while Lux's agency negotiated with the studio's West Coast office, neither aware of the other's activity. The fact that negotiations for Lux were concluded earlier resolved the problem. The following year Ford presented an adaption of Camille when Theatre Guild had announced plans to broadcast its own version but had not set a date for it.

== NBC version ==
The first version of the program debuted on October 5, 1947, replacing the NBC Symphony Orchestra's broadcast on Sundays from 5 to 6 p.m. Eastern Time. Howard Lindsay was the master of ceremonies and narrator. Jay Jackson was the announcer, and Ken Banghart was the Ford reporter.

=== Actors ===
Launching Ford Theater essentially meant "establishment of a genuine repertory theatre under commercial sponsorship" rather than using established stars. Producer George Zachary cited disadvantages of the star system:

- Parts needed to be tailored to stars, thus disrupting characterization as well as proportions of other parts.
- Typecasting of stars limited the kinds of roles that they would accept.
- Some stars were photogenic but did not act well.
- Even experienced stage and film stars often "fare badly in radio".

He added that experienced radio actors create roles, in contrast to "less talented stars who merely play themselves". Media critic John Crosby wrote, "While radio actors have consistently proved more capable in their own medium than movie stars, the public remains apathetic toward them."

Actors who appeared on the show included Ed Begley, Shirley Booth, Les Damon, Paul Douglas, Eric Dressler, Lauren Gilbert, Virginia Gilmore, Wendell Holmes, Muriel Kirkland, John Larkin, Gary Merrill, Claudia Morgan, Arnold Moss, Santos Ortega, Anne Seymour, Everett Sloane, Les Tremayne, Evelyn Varden, and Vicki Vola.

=== Writers and scripts ===
Zachary said initially that eight prominent writers had been commissioned to create original scripts for the series.

The trade publication Variety noted that scripting for Ford Theater departed from the norm for radio programs in two ways. Prior to the show's debut, Kenyon & Eckhardt (the producing agency) announced that each 13-week cycle of the program would include at least two original scripts, with the remaining scripts being adaptations from films, novels, or plays. The agency sought outlines of scripts from freelance writers. A writer whose outline resulted in having a script assigned received $1000. If the script was used in a broadcast, the writer would receive an additional $1000. The agency paid another $1000 if the program used the script a second time. Another break with tradition was that rights to the script reverted to the author after the second performance.

By November 1947, original submissions had not matched the agency's hopes. The New York Times reported that the problem lay not in the number submitted but in their quality: "... several hundred have been submitted but only a very small fraction are suitable for broadcast and an infinitesimal number acceptable." The program met its quota of using two original scripts during its first 13 weeks, but only one was in store for use in the second 13 weeks. The report suggested that the money offered was not comparable to what a similar amount of effort might earn a writer for a work for a film or a play.

=== Production ===
Zachary was the producer and director. Writers included Stanley Evans, Will Glickman, Charles Gussman, and Lillian Schoen. Howard Teichmann was script editor. George Faulkner was continuity chief. Lyn Murray was the musical conductor. Sponsored by Ford Motor Company, the program contained commercials that were instititutional in nature, in contrast to other programs sponsored by Ford dealers associations, on which commercials "make direct selling pitches". The show's billings amounted to $2 million.

The trade publication Billboard noted that putting Ford Theater in the 5-6 p.m. slot strengthened NBC's afternoon schedule and said that the move was likely to increase competition for other networks at that time. However, Ford's contract with NBC contained a provision that would move the show to an evening time slot if one became available.

By March 1948 both NBC and Ford's producing agency were trying to find a better time slot, while Billboard reported that ABC and CBS were trying to find slots for the program on their networks. The agency felt that a better time would increase the show's rating, and it also wanted to move it further from Fred Allen's show, which was heard later on Sundays on NBC and was sponsored by Ford dealers. An article in the trade publication Sponsor noted the prestige value of Ford Theater to the company but added, "However, with a high-pressure, fast-moving vehicle (Fred Allen) on the same network on the same night delivering audiences within the top five in radio, the industry wonders just how long Henry Ford III will be willing to carry the class presentation ..."

== CBS version ==
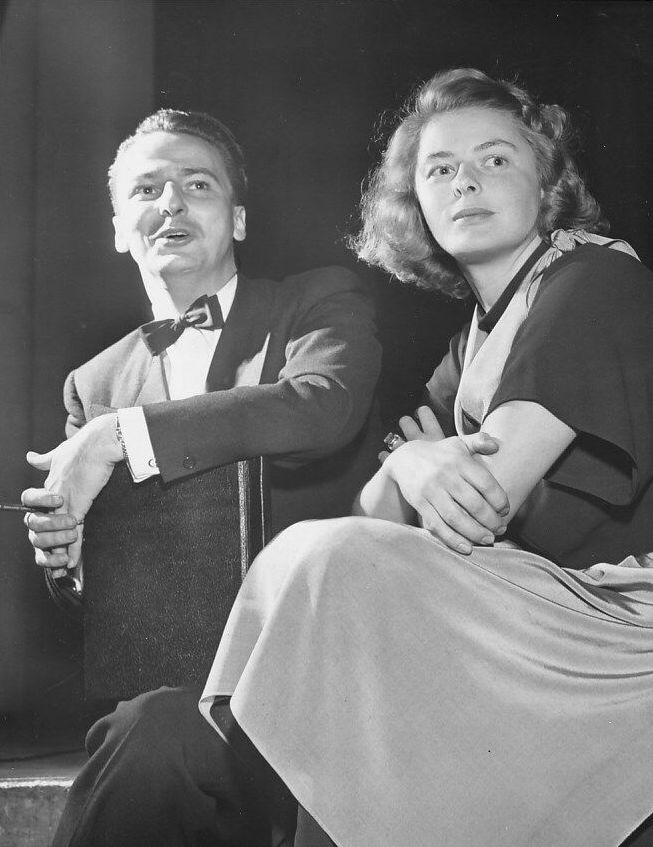
Fletcher Markle and Ingrid Bergman chat during preparation for a presentation of Anna Christie on Ford Theater on CBS in January 1949.

Ford Theater's premiere on CBS radio occurred on October 8, 1948. The change of networks occurred after NBC was unable to provide an evening time slot for the program. CBS broadcast it on Fridays from 9 to 10 p.m. Eastern Time. The change in networks was accompanied by a change in format, with an increase in budget to $15,000 per episode and an emphasis on well-known stars. The programming also was revised with what Billboard described as "easing up on the artiness" in a way that would "combine the best features of Lux Radio Theatre and Theatre Guild of the Air". The move to CBS was accompanied by the end of that network's Studio One series, with its last episode broadcast on July 27, 1948. Billboard had reported prior to the move that the sustaining Studio One, which had a format similar to Ford Theater, would be unlikely to survive in light of Ford's funding advantage.

Actors heard on the CBS version included Jean Arthur, Lucille Ball, Joan Bennett, Jack Benny, Ronald Colman, Bing Crosby, Marlene Dietrich, Bob Hope, Burt Lancaster, Ray Milland, and Claude Rains. Fletcher Markle directed the series and wrote some of the adaptations used on it. Vincent McConnor was the script editor, and Ian Smith was the continuity editor.

The show's competition included Break the Bank and Eddie Cantor's show. The program ended with the July 1, 1949, episode as the sponsor chose to focus on the video counterpart, The Ford Television Theatre. It was replaced by This Is Broadway.

== Episodes ==
Partial List of Episodes of Ford Theater
Date	Episode	Actor(s)
October 5, 1947	"A Connecticut Yankee in King Arthur's Court"	Mason Adams, Karl Swenson, Charita Bauer, James Monks, Santos Ortega
October 12, 1947	"The Great McGinty"	-
November 16, 1947	"Carmen Jones"	Muriel Smith, Luther Saxon, Alton Warren
December 7, 1947	"We Hold These Truths"	-
February 8, 1948	"Abe Lincoln in Illinois"	-
February 15, 1948	"Abe Lincoln in Washington"	Swenson, Muriel Kirkland
March 21, 1948	"It's a Gift"	Cliff Carpenter, Elspeth Eric, Carl Eastman, Bill Zuckert, James Van Dyke, Ivor Francis, Les Tremayne, Rod Hendrickson, Frank Dane
March 28, 1948	"The Informer"	Bryan Herbert
April 18, 1948	"The Silver Cord"	-
October 8, 1948	"Madam Bovary"	Marlene Dietrich, Van Heflin, Claude Rains
November 12, 1948	"Camille"	Ingrid Bergman
January 7, 1949	"Talk of the Town"	Ronald Colman
May 6, 1949	"Ladies in Retirement"	Ida Lupino

== Critical response ==
A review of the presentation of "A Connecticut Yankee in King Arthur's Court" in The New York Times called it "the first disappointment of the season" and labeled the adaptation "a soap-opera rewrite" of the Mark Twain work. Jack Gould wrote that the episode turned the original characterization of the Yankee into "a comic-book hero". He also pointed out production problems, including "a noticeable lack of contrasting voice levels" of actors and hesitancy in the way the orchestra supported moods of the story. Gould complimented the actors' performances and wrote that the policy of using established radio actors was "a refreshing policy in casting".

Billboard's review of the same episode said that the adaptation had "a continually jarring note" because of the way it was "refurbished and ultra-modernized". The review said that although some qualities of characters were lost in the adaptation, "As an adventure story, however, the production more than satisfied." It complimented the direction (except for one scene) and said that the lead actors gave "good performances all around".

Gould described the broadcast of "Abe Lincoln in Washington" as "a very great disappointment and a strangely dispirited effort". He wrote that the script "was disconcertingly episodic", perhaps because of the limited time available. He also pointed out flaws in the performances of Swenson as Lincoln and Kirkland as his wife. The review concluded by saying that Lindsay's narration ending the episode had "excessive preciseness with condescending overemphasis on diction", missing the quality of the lines and breaking their mood "like a public address system blasting the peacefulness of a long winter's night in the country".

Ford Theater "finally hit its stride" in its second-season premiere, according to a review in the trade publication Variety. The review said that the production of "Madame Bovary" was "an exciting hour of listening". While complimenting the stars' performances, the review gave higher praise to Markle for creating a distinctive animation for the episode. It said that his use of musical elements and background sounds approximated "something of a new dimensional quality for a strictly audio medium".
