= Doe Avedon =

American actress (1925–2011)

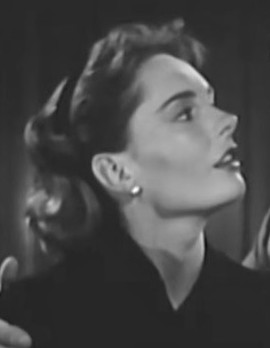
- Avedon in 1949
- Born: Dorcas Marie Nowell; April 7, 1925; Old Westbury, New York, U.S.
- Died: December 18, 2011 (aged 86); Encino, Los Angeles, California, U.S.
- Resting place: Forest Lawn Memorial Park
- Other names: Betty Harper; Doe Avedon Siegel
- Occupations: Model, actress
- Spouses: Richard Avedon (m. 1944; div. 1949) Dan Mathews (m. 1949; died 1952) Don Siegel (m. 1957; div. 1975)
- Partner: Michael Liscio
- Children: 4

Dorcas Marie Avedon (née Nowell; April 7, 1925 – December 18, 2011), known professionally as Doe Avedon, was an American model and actress.

== Early life ==
Doe Avedon was born Dorcas Marie Nowell in Old Westbury, New York, Long Island ,on April 7, 1925. Her mother died when she was three years old, after which she was raised by her father who worked as a butler. When Doe was 12 years old her father died; she was raised by the wealthy family for whom her father had worked.

== Career ==
At the age of 19, she began working at a bank in New York City. It was there that she met up and coming photographer Richard Avedon. They were married in 1944 and Avedon set about making his new wife a top model. He also changed her name from "Dorcas" to "Doe" because he felt her wide set, brown eyes looked like those of a doe. While Avedon appeared in numerous photographs shot by her husband, she did not enjoy modeling and turned to acting in the late 1940s. In 1948, she made her Broadway debut in The Young and Fair. The following year, she cast in My Name Is Aquilon, starring Jean-Pierre Aumont and Arlene Francis. That same year, she made her film debut (under the name "Betty Harper") in the 1949 film noir Jigsaw.

Later that same year, Avedon divorced Richard to marry actor Dan Matthews whom she met while she was performing in the touring production of Mae West's Diamond Lil. She retired from acting shortly thereafter. In February 1952, Avedon was driving with Matthews from New York City to Los Angeles when their car hit a patch of ice, skidded and overturned. Avedon suffered minor injuries but Matthews was killed. After her husband's death, Avedon returned to acting.

In 1954, she appeared in The High and the Mighty starring John Wayne, followed by a supporting role in the biographical film Deep in My Heart. From 1955 to 1956, she appeared in the recurring role of Diane Walker on the drama series Big Town. In 1957, Avedon was cast as "Mike McCall", one of the three lead roles in the syndicated sitcom How to Marry a Millionaire, which was based on the 1953 film of the same name that starred Betty Grable, Marilyn Monroe and Lauren Bacall. After filming the pilot episode in the spring of 1957, Avedon's part was recast.

In 1957, Avedon married director Don Siegel. After her marriage, she retired to raise the couple's four children. Avedon and Siegel were divorced in 1975. She briefly returned to acting in 1984 with a role in John Cassavetes' Love Streams.

== Death ==
On December 18, 2011, Avedon died of pneumonia at the Encino Hospital Medical Center in Encino at the age of 86. Her funeral was held on December 22 at Forest Lawn Memorial Park.

== In popular culture ==
The 1957 film Funny Face is based on the story of Doe and Richard Avedon. Audrey Hepburn portrayed "Jo", who is based on Doe, while the character of Dick Avery, portrayed by Fred Astaire, is based on Richard Avedon. The film was written by Leonard Gershe who was a friend of the couple.

== Broadway ==
Date	Production	Role
November 22, 1948 – January 8, 1949	The Young and Fair	Drucilla Eldridge
February 9 – March 7, 1949	My Name Is Aquilon	Denise

== Filmography ==
Year	Title	Role	Notes
1949	Jigsaw	Caroline Riggs	Credited as Betty Harper; Alternative title: Gun Moll
1949	The Philco Television Playhouse	Laurette Harrington	Episode: "What Makes Sammy Run?"
1954	The High and the Mighty	Miss Spalding	
1954	The Public Defender	Patricia Selby	Episode: "Confession of Guilt"
1954	Deep in My Heart	Lillian Harris Romberg	
1955-1956	Big Town	Diane Walker	12 episodes
1956	NBC Matinee Theater		Episode: "Three for the Money"
1956	The Boss	Elsie Reynolds	
1957	How to Marry a Millionaire	Mike McCall	Unaired pilot
1957	The Ford Television Theatre	Ruth Harding	Episode: "The Idea Man"
1958	Alcoa Theatre	Ruth	Episode: "The Victim"
1958	Climax!	Alice Peters	Episode: "Albert Anastasia - His Life and Death"
1984	Love Streams	Mrs. Kiner	(final film role)
