= Home of Peace Cemetery (Santa Cruz, California) =

Jewish cemetery in Santa Cruz County, California

Details
- Established: 1877
- Location: 422 Meder St, Santa Cruz, California
- Country: United States
- Coordinates: 36.97467°N 122.05640°W
- Type: Jewish
- Owned by: Temple Beth-El
- Website: tbeaptos.org
- Find a Grave: Home of Peace Cemetery

The Home of Peace Cemetery (also called Beit Shalom) is a Jewish cemetery in Santa Cruz, California. Consecrated in 1877 by the Hebrew Benevolent Society, it is located on Meder Street – named after Moses Meder, a Mormon businessman who gifted the land to the Society – on the west side of Santa Cruz, near the University of California, Santa Cruz.

Temple Beth-El, the local synagogue in Santa Cruz, operates the cemetery. It is the oldest Jewish cemetery in Santa Cruz County, California.

== Notable burials ==
- Hugh De Lacy (1910 – 1986), politician from Seattle, Washington; his last wife Dorothy (née Baskin) was Jewish.

== See also ==
- List of cemeteries in California
