= Wendy Warren and the News =

1947-1958 radio soap opera

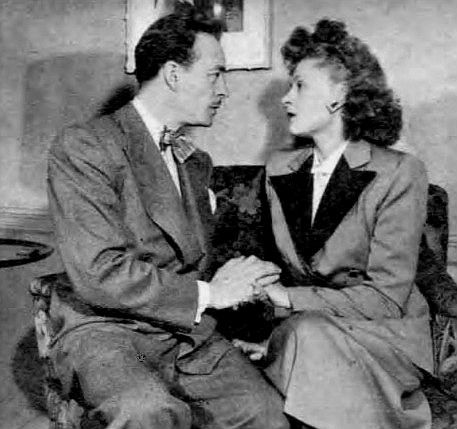
- Les Tremayne (as Gil Kendal) and Florence Freeman (as Wendy Warren) are shown in a scene from Wendy Warren and the News.
- Genre: Soap opera
- Country of origin: United States
- Language: English
- Syndicates: CBS
- Starring: Florence Freeman
- Written by: John Picard; Frank Provo
- Directed by: Hoyt Allen; Allan Fristoe; Tom McDermott; Don Wallace; Paul Roberts
- Original release: June 23, 1947 – November 12, 1958
- Sponsored by: General Foods; Procter & Gamble; Armour and Company

Wendy Warren and the News was a radio soap opera in the United States. It was broadcast on CBS weekday afternoons, June 23, 1947 – November 12, 1958. The program was notable for the title character's reporting actual "women's news" in addition to appearing in a more traditional soap opera role.

== Format ==
One old-time radio reference book called Wendy Warren and the News a "show within a show." Another said the program was "a unique insertion in the schedule and there was nothing like it elsewhere." A contemporary magazine's review called the show's structure "A cunning trap ... set by CBS for opposed-to-soap-opera dialers."

Each episode began with real-life news presented by CBS newsman Douglas Edwards, followed by "a few items of particular interest to women" presented by Florence Freeman in the role of the title character, Wendy Warren. Then the actual soap opera began, relating the "trials and tribulations" of Warren's daily life.

The plot featured Warren as a two-media journalist, reporting for a fictional newspaper (the Manhattan Gazette) as well as on radio. As was typical of radio soap operas, the heroine's personal life was a primary focus, such as in one episode when "Wendy walked out of the studio at the conclusion of their broadcast into the arms of a forgotten fiance, a U.S. flyer that she thought had been killed five years before in China. At the time when he returned, Wendy was engaged to her publisher boss."

== Personnel ==
The program's characters and cast are shown in the table below.

Character	Actor/Actress
Wendy Warren	Florence Freeman
Douglas Edwards	himself
Mark Douglas	Lamont Johnson
Gil Kendal	Les Tremayne
Nora Marsh	Anne Burr
Adele Lang	Jane Lauren
Charles Lang	Horace Brahan
Jean	Meg Wyllie
Don Smith	John Raby
Bill Flood	Hugh James
Sam Warren	Rod Hendrickson
Aunt Dorric	Tess Shehan

Source: Radio Programs, 1924-1984: A Catalog of More Than 1800 Shows, except as indicated.

Directors were Paul Roberts, Hoyt Allen, Allan Fristoe, Tom McDermott, and Don Wallace; the music director was Clarke Morgan. Writers were John Picard and Frank Provo.

== Sponsors ==
Wendy Warren and the News' initial sponsorship by General Foods resulted from a problem that arose with the company's sponsorship of another program, that of Kate Smith. The January 31, 1949, issue of Sponsor magazine reported the background as follows:

After nearly 15 years of sponsoring Kate Smith, her daytime rating in 1946 was high on the list for her type of show. Everything was going fine for General Foods until Kate began to plug for a higher talent fee. While General Foods executives were carefully figuring the proposed increases against her proven sales results, Kate, feeling secure in her position after 15 years, began to make cracks on the air about independent grocers, and how much better (and safer) it was to buy at chain stores. It drew fire immediately from independent grocers, particularly from the Michigan Retail Grocers Association, who let General Foods know in no uncertain terms what they thought of Kate Smith. That did it. Miss Smith was dropped, and Wendy Warren went into the time period on CBS.

Other sponsors included Armour and Company and Procter & Gamble.

== Legacy ==
"The Wendy Warren Award" was a joint project of the program and Today's Woman magazine. It was presented monthly, with each recipient being a woman "who has added stature to a woman's place in the world, through marked success in business, industry, science or the arts, or through her activities and accomplishments on behalf of community welfare." Judges were Edwards and Freeman from the program and Julian Bach, the magazine's editor. Initial recipients on September 1, 1953, were Mrs. John Eisenhower and Dr. Estelle Popham of Hunter College.
