= Fletcher Markle =

Canadian entertainer (1921–1991)

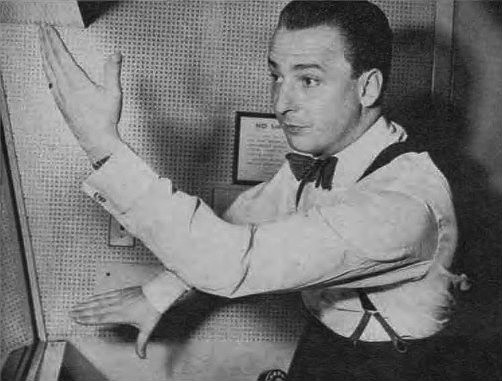
- Fletcher Markle directing the CBS Radio series Studio One (1948)
- Born: March 27, 1921; Winnipeg, Manitoba, Canada
- Died: May 23, 1991 (aged 70); Pasadena, California, U.S.
- Occupations: Actor, screenwriter, television producer, television and film director
- Spouses: Helen Blanche Willis (m. 1944; div. 1949); Mercedes McCambridge (m. 1950; div. 1962); Dorothy Conradt (m. 1963)

Fletcher Markle (March 27, 1921 – May 23, 1991) was a Canadian actor, screenwriter, television producer and director. Markle began a radio career in Canada, then worked in radio, film and television in the United States.

== Early years ==
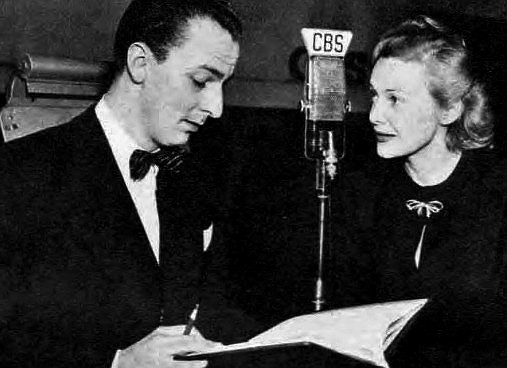
Fletcher Markle and Madeleine Carroll at a rehearsal of "A Farewell to Arms" for Studio One (1948)

Born in Winnipeg, Manitoba, Markle was the son of Mr. and Mrs. George Markle. He graduated from Prince of Wales Secondary School in Vancouver and chose not to attend college because "there were too many things to do".

== Films and television ==
Markle began his career at age 17 in Vancouver, British Columbia, doing radio dramas. He created the Phoenix Theater, which began with stage productions and then went on radio for a 68-week series of hour-long plays

He worked with a group whose members included John Drainie, Lister Sinclair, and Alan Young on such local stations as CJOR, CKWX and the CBC network. During World War II, he served in the Royal Canadian Air Force. During that service he acted in the film Journey Together during some of his off-duty time.

In 1945, Markle received a $1,500 grant from Twentieth Century Fox to finish his partly autobiographical novel There Was A Young Man. The award came while he was working on the Radio Folio series for the Canadian Broadcasting Corporation (CBC). The CBC had commissioned Markle to write that program, which consisted of self-contained complete episodes that ranged from light to serious in content. Markle had earlier written the Baker's Dozen series on CBC.

The group moved to Toronto, and Markle had a role as an actor in Journey Together (1946). Markle then moved to New York City, and although not listed in the credits, contributed to the screenplay for Orson Welles's The Lady from Shanghai (1947).

During his time in New York, he contributed to the CBS radio anthology, Studio One. In late 1952, he was brought in to replace Worthington Miner on the TV version of that program.

He produced, co-wrote, and had a cameo role in the movie Jigsaw (1949). He directed Nancy Davis, Ray Milland, and John Hodiak in Night into Morning (1951).

During the 1950s and early 1960s, he was a director, producer and host for a number of television series such as Front Row Center and Boris Karloff's Thriller, Father of the Bride, and Telescope. He directed the movie The Incredible Journey (1963) for Walt Disney. Markle is also credited for signing Lorne Greene to play Ben Cartwright in Bonanza.

In 1956, Markle and his wife, Mercedes McCambridge, launched a company to produce feature films and content for independent television. Cubano Productions initially gained rights to 23 stories by Burnham Carter. The stories, which had been published in The Saturday Evening Post, centered around a young Cuban couple and their Cafe Mosca in Havana. They were to form the basis of a 30-minute TV series, Tonight in Havana. Markle and McCambridge also planned to develop the stories into feature films.

Markle returned to radio in late 1978 as one of the writers for Sears Radio Theater.

Markle received an Academy Award nomination for the documentary film The V-1: Story of the Robot Bomb, which he wrote and narrated.

== Personal life ==
Markle married Helen Blanche Willis in Toronto in 1944, and they divorced on June 14, 1949. They had a son, actor and writer Stephen Markle. He later married actress Mercedes McCambridge, and they divorced in 1962 after 12 years of marriage, during which he adopted her son. Markle's third marriage was to Dorothy Conradt, from 1963 until his death in 1991.

== Death ==
On May 23, 1991, Markle died at Huntington Hospital in Pasadena, California, of heart failure, aged 70.

== Filmography ==
=== Producer ===
- Journey Together (1949)
- Jigsaw (Uncredited, 1949)
- Grounds for Marriage (1951)
- Panic! (1 episode, 1958)
- Front Row Center (Unknown episodes, 1949)
- Ford Television Theatre (Unknown episodes, 1952)
- Life With Father (Unknown episodes, 1953)
- Studio One (1 episode, 1953)
- Front Row Center (5 episodes, 1955)
- Colgate Theatre (1 episode, 1958)
- Frances Farmer Presents (Unknown episodes)
- Thriller (8 episodes, 1960)
- Hong Kong (5 episodes, 1961)
- Vacation Playhouse (1 episode, 1965)
- Telescope (8 episodes, 1966-1971)

=== Director ===
- Studio One (Unknown episodes)
- Front Row Center (Unknown episodes)
- Jigsaw (1949)
- Night into Morning (1951)
- The Man with a Cloak (1951)
- The Ford Television Theatre (1 episode, 1952)
- Footlights Theater (1 episode, 1953)
- Front Row Center (4 episodes, 1955)
- Rendezvous (Unknown episodes)
- The George Sanders Mystery Theater (8 episodes, 1957)
- Panic! (1 episode, 1958)
- Colgate Theatre (episode "Tonight in Havana," 1958)
- Buckskin (1 episode, 1959)
- Thriller (1 episode, 1960)
- Hong Kong (1 episode, 1961)
- Father of the Bride (Unknown episodes)
- The Incredible Journey (1963)
- Vacation Playhouse (1 episode, 1965)
- Telescope (2 episodes, 1964-1966)
- Julia (2 episodes, 1969)
- The Wonderful World of Disney (1 episode, 1977)

=== Writer ===
- The Lady from Shanghai (Uncredited, 1947)
- Jigsaw (1949)
- The Wednesday Play (1 episode, 1964)
