= List of radio soap operas =

Radio daytime drama serials were broadcast for decades, and some expanded to television. These dramas are often referred to as "soaps", a shortening from "soap opera". That term stems from the original dramatic serials broadcast on radio that had soap manufacturers such as Procter & Gamble, Colgate-Palmolive, and Lever Brothers as sponsors and producers. These early radio serials were broadcast in weekday daytime slots when mostly housewives would be able to listen; thus the shows were aimed at and consumed by a predominantly female audience.

Show	Region/country	Began	Ended	Creator	Ref.
Adopted Daughter	United States	1939	1941	Jettabee Anne Hopkins	
The Affairs of Dr Gentry		1957	1959		
Against the Storm	United States	1939	1952	Sandra Michael	
Amanda of Honeymoon Hill	United States	1940	1946	Frank and Anne Hummert	
The Archers	United Kingdom	1951	present	Godfrey Baseley	
Arnold Grimm's Daughter	United States	1937	1942	Margaret Sangster	
Aunt Jenny's Real Life Stories	United States	1937	1955		
Aunt Mary	United States	1942	1951	Leigh and Virginia Crosby & Gil South	
Bachelor's Children	United States	1935	1946	Bess Flynn	
Backstage Wife	United States	1935	1959	Frank and Anne Hummert	
Barry Cameron		1945	1946	Richard, Leonard, and Peggy Blake	
Betty and Bob	United States	1932	1940	Frank and Anne Hummert	
Big Sister	United States	1936	1952	Julian Funt, Carl Bixby, Bob Newman and Bill Sweets	
Blue Hills	Australia	1949	1976	Gwen Meredith	
Bob and Victoria		1947	1947	Lee and Virginia Crosby & Gil South	
Brave Tomorrow	United States	1943	1944	Ruth Adams Knight	
Brenda Curtis	United States	1939	1940	Ken Roberts	
Bright Horizon	United States	1941	1945	James and Elizabeth Hart, John M. Young, Ted Maxwell, Stuart Hawkins, and Kathleen Norris	
The Brighter Day	United States	1948	1956	Irna Phillips	
The Carters of Elm Street	United States	1939	1940	Mona Kent	
Central City	United States	1938	1941	Frank and Anne Hummert	
The Colcloughs	United Kingdom	1991; 2016	1993 present	Mike Hopwood	
Citizens	United Kingdom	1987	1991	BBC	
City Soap	United Kingdom	2005	2008	Preston Fm	
Clara, Lu, and Em	United States	1930	1942	Louise Starkey, Isobel Carothers and Helen King	
College Road	Ireland	2009	2009	MightyStudent	
Dan Harding's Wife	United States	1936	1938	Ken Robinson	
David Harum	United States	1936	1950	Frank and Anne Hummert	
Doc Barclay's Daughters	United States	1939	1940	Frank and Anne Hummert	
The Doctor's Wife	United States	1952	1956	Manya Starr	
Family Skeleton	United States	1953	1954	Carlton E. Morse	
Front Line Family	United Kingdom / Canada	1941	1948		
Front Page Farrell	United States	1941	1954	Frank and Anne Hummert	
Girl Alone	United States	1935	1941	Fayette Krum	
The Goldbergs	United States	1929	1950	Gertrude Berg	
The Guiding Light	United States	1937	1956	Irna Phillips	
Helpmate	United States	1941	1944	Frank and Anne Hummert	
Her Honor, Nancy James		1938	1939		
Hilltop House		1937, 1948	1941, 1957	Edward Wolf	
Home of the Brave	United States	1941	1941		
Into the Light		1941	1942	Larry Bearson	
Jane Arden	United States	1938	1939		
John's Other Wife		1936	1942	Frank and Anne Hummert	
Joyce Jordan, M.D.	United States	1938	1956		
Judy and Jane	United States	1932	1935	Frank and Anne Hummert	
Just Plain Bill	United States	1932	1955	Frank and Anne Hummert	
Kate Hopkins, Angel of Mercy		1940	1942	Gertrude Berg and Chester McCracken	
Kitty Foyle	United States	1942	1944		
Kitty Keene, Incorporated	United States	1937	1941	Day Keene and Lester Huntly	
The Life and Love of Dr. Susan		1939	1939	Edith Meiser	
Life Begins		1940	1941		
Life Can Be Beautiful	United States	1938	1954	Don Becker and Carl Bixby	
Life of Mary Sothern		1934	1938	Don Becker	
The Light of the World	United States	1940	1950		
Linda's First Love		1939	ca. 1950		
Lone Journey		1940	1952	Sandra Michael	
Lonely Women	United States	1942	1943	Irna Phillips	
Lora Lawton	United States	1943	1950		
Lorenzo Jones	United States	1937	1955		
Ma Perkins	United States	1933	1960	Frank and Anne Hummert	
Matysiakowie	Poland	1956	present	Jerzy Janicki	
Mrs Dale's Diary	United Kingdom	1948	1969	Jonqil Antony	
My True Story	United States	1943	1956	Margaret Sangster	
Myrt and Marge	United States	1931	1942	Myrtle Vail	
Newarkers	United Kingdom	2013	2013	Radio Newark	
The O'Neills	United States	1935	1943		
One Man's Family	United States	1932	1959	Carlton E. Morse	
Our Gal Sunday	United States	1936	1959		
Painted Dreams	United States	1930	1943	Irna Phillips	
Penny For Your Thoughts	United Kingdom	2018	present	Marion Hartley (Script) Brian Curtis (Producer) on Vectis Radio (104.6FM & www.vectisradio.com)	
Pepper Young's Family	United States	1932	1959	Elaine Sterne Carrington	
Perry Mason	United States	1943	1955	Erle Stanley Gardner	
Portia Faces Life	United States	1940	1952		
Pretty Kitty Kelly	United States	1937	1940		
The Right to Happiness	United States	1939	1960	Irna Phillips	
The Road of Life	United States	1937	1959	Irna Phillips	
The Romance of Helen Trent	United States	1933	1960	Frank and Anne Hummert	
Rosemary	United States	1944	1955	Elaine Sterne Carrington	
The Second Mrs. Burton	United States	1946	1960		
Silver Street	United Kingdom	2004	2010		
Sounds of the City	United States	1973	1975	Shauneille Perry	
Staying Well in Camberwell	United States	2011	2011	Cheryl L. Davis	
Stella Dallas	United States	1937	1955		
The Story of Mary Marlin	United States	1935	1952		
The Strange Romance of Evelyn Winters	United States	1944	1952		
This Is Nora Drake	United States	1947	1959		
Today's Children	United States	1933	1938	Irna Phillips	
Today's Children (second series)	United States	1943	1950	Irna Phillips (Dialogue by Virginia Cooke)	
Valiant Lady	United States	1938	1952		
Waggoners' Walk	United Kingdom	1969	1980		
We Love and Learn	United States	1942	1956		
Wendy Warren and the News	United States	1947	1958		
Westway	United Kingdom	1997	2005		
When a Girl Marries	United States	1939	1957	Elaine Sterne Carrington	
The Woman in My House	United States	1951	1959		
Woman in White	United States	1938	1948		
A Woman of America	United States	1943	1945		
You Me Now	New Zealand	2010	2012	Radio New Zealand and All The Way Home Productions	
Young Doctor Malone	United States	1939	1960	Irna Phillips	
Young Widder Brown	United States	1938	1956	Frank Hummert and Anne Hummert	
Your Family and Mine	United States	1938	1940		
