= Just Plain Bill =

American radio program (1933–55)

- Drawing of Ruth Russell by actor-singer Norman Sweetser (1894-1980)
- Other names: Bill the Barber
- Genre: Daytime dramatic serial
- Running time: 15 minutes
- Country of origin: United States
- Language: English
- Syndicates: CBS, Blue, NBC Red
- Starring: Arthur Hughes, Ruth Russell
- Announcer: Don Pardo
- Created by: Frank and Anne Hummert
- Written by: Robert Hardy Andrews; David Davidson
- Directed by: Martha Atwell
- Original release: September 19, 1932 – September 30, 1955
- Opening theme: "Darling Nellie Gray"
- Ending theme: "Polly Wolly Doodle"
- Sponsored by: Kolyonos Toothpaste; Anacin

Just Plain Bill was a 1931-1955 15-minute American radio drama program heard on CBS Radio and NBC Radio. It was "a story of people just like people we all know."

The program began on CBS on September 19, 1932. It was originally broadcast at night, but on October 16, 1933, CBS added a daytime version. Night broadcasts ended in 1935, leaving only the daytime program thereafter until the show ended on September 30, 1955.

It told the story of Bill Davidson (Arthur Hughes), a barber in the town of Hartville, and his daughter Nancy (Ruth Russell). Bill often became involved in helping his friends and neighbors when he wasn't cutting hair. Davidson was seldom directly affected by the problems in which he became involved, but he wanted to help people — especially Nancy — when they faced difficulties.

The show was created by Frank and Anne Hummert, who produced many radio daytime drama series, including Amanda of Honeymoon Hill, Backstage Wife, Front Page Farrell, John's Other Wife, Little Orphan Annie, Ma Perkins, Mr. Chameleon, Mr. Keen, Tracer of Lost Persons, Our Gal Sunday and Young Widder Brown.

Music was by Hal Brown (1865–1942), who played harmonica and whistled the Just Plain Bill opening theme, "Darling Nellie Gray". The closing theme was "Polly Wolly Doodle." Don Pardo was the program's announcer towards the end of the series, which came to an end on September 30, 1955.

== Personnel ==
Characters in Just Plain Bill and the actors who portrayed them included those shown in the table below.

Character	Actor
Bill Davidson	Arthur Hughes
Nancy Donovan	Ruth Russell; Toni Darnay
Kerry Donovan	James Meighan
Wiki Donovan	Sarah Fussell; Madeleine Pierce
Kathleen Chatton	Ara Gerald
Jonathan Hillery	Macdonald Carey
Shirley King	Audrey Egan
Reba Britton	Charlotte Lawrence
Margaret Burns	Elizabeth Day
Humphrey Fuller	Charles Eggleston
Pearl Sutton	Ann Shepherd
John Britton	William Woodson
Laticia Davenport	Vera Allen

Announcers included Andre Baruch, Fielden Farrington, Ed Herlihy, and Roger Krupp.

== Sponsors ==
The series was sponsored by Anacin for 18 of the program's 23-year run. Its initial sponsor was Kolynos toothpaste, In September 1936, Anacin and BiSoDol replaced Kolynos, with each product sponsoring half of the episodes in a week. (Even with the change, corporate sponsorship remained the same, since all three products had the same manufacturer.) A later sponsor was Clapp's baby food.

== Cultural references ==
In The Three Stooges short Goofs and Saddles Larry Fine's character is known as "Just Plain Bill."

The April 24, 1949 episode of The Jack Benny Program has Jack shopping for a new car, passing up such dealers as Madman Muntz and Psychiatric Sam in favor of "Just Plain Bill." This episode was remade on February 24, 1952. Bill was played by Jim Backus in the original, and Joseph Kearns in the remake.

The January 14, 1950 episode of The Bob Hope Show has Hope, with guest star Bing Crosby, performing a soap opera parody called "Just Plain Bing."

The 1965 Wile E. Coyote and the Road Runner cartoon "Just Plane Beep" has the coyote using an airplane to help him catch the Road Runner.

In the M*A*S*H episode "Major Fred C. Dobbs," Hawkeye tape-records an encounter between Frank Burns and Hot Lips in the latter's tent, then plays it back for Frank in the guise of "my favorite armed forces soap opera, Just Plain MacArthur."

The comedy team Bob and Ray parodied the show in their sketch "Just Fancy Dan."

== Listen to ==
- Just Plain Bill

== See also ==
- List of radio soaps
