= Backstage Wife =

American radio soap opera (1935–1959)

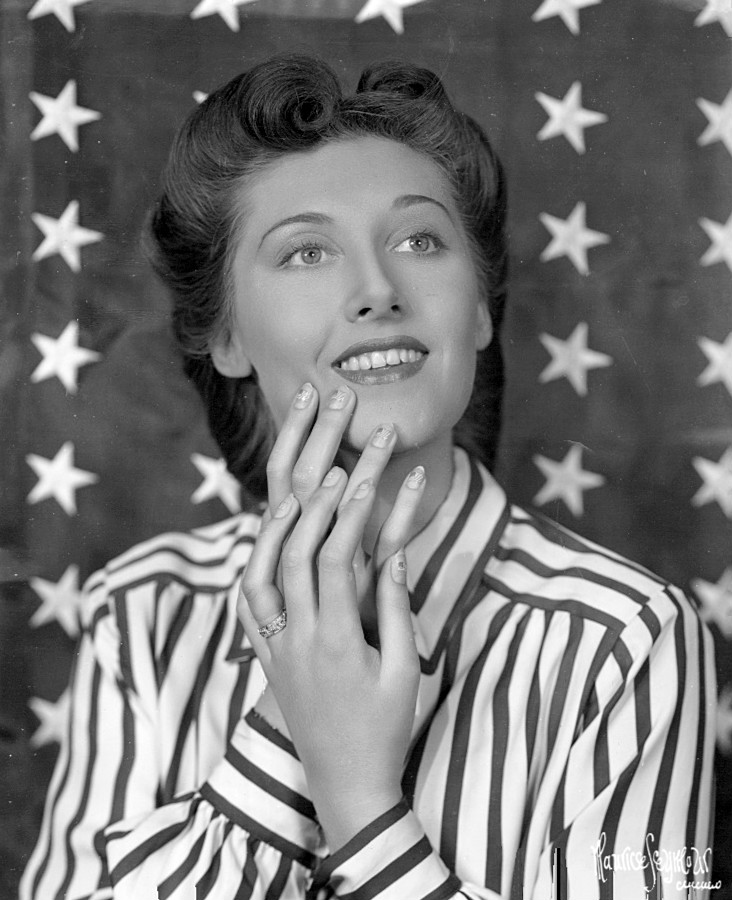
- Vivian Fridell portrayed Mary Noble on Backstage Wife in the 1930s and early 1940s
- Other names: Mary Noble, Backstage Wife
- Genre: Daytime serial drama
- Running time: 15 minutes
- Country of origin: United States
- Language: English
- Syndicates: MBS; Blue; CBS
- Starring: Vivian Fridell; Ken Griffin
- Announcer: Pierre Andre
- Created by: Frank and Anne Hummert
- Original release: August 5, 1935 – January 2, 1959
- Audio format: Mono
- Opening theme: "Stay As Sweet As You Are"
- Sponsored by: Double Danderine; Dr. Lyon's Tooth Powder; Ironized Yeast; Mulsified Cocoanut Oil Shampoo; Procter & Gamble

Backstage Wife is an American soap opera radio program that details the travails of Mary Noble, a girl from a small town in Iowa who came to New York seeking her future.

== Personnel ==
Vivian Fridell had the title role from 1935 until the early 1940s. It was then taken over by Claire Niesen, who played Mary Noble for 14 years, until the end of the series. Mary's husband, Larry Noble, was portrayed by Ken Griffin, then James Meighan, and finally, Guy Sorel. The music was supplied by organist Chet Kingsbury.

Others heard on the series included Bob Jellison, Klock Ryder, and John Walsh.

== Plot ==
Each episode opened with the announcer (Pierre Andre, Roger Krupp, Stuart V. Dawson) explaining:

Now, we present once again, Backstage Wife, the story of Mary Noble, a little Iowa girl who married one of America's most handsome actors, Larry Noble, matinée idol of a million other women — the story of what it means to be the wife of a famous star.

In 1946, when the program was in its 12th year, a newspaper article summarized the plot's status as follows:

When her husband joined the Coast Guard, Mary tried to carry on his work in the theatre, thereby establishing a reputation for herself as an actress. Now Larry has come home, and the two are encountering the difficulties of peacetime readjustment.

By 1951, Larry had been charged with a murder that had happened backstage at a theater. Larry was found innocent, and the killer (described as having undergone a nervous breakdown) was committed to an institution, but not before splashing acid in the face of Mary, "possibly disfiguring her forever".

== Production ==
The show was created by Frank and Anne Hummert, who produced many radio daytime drama series, including Amanda of Honeymoon Hill, Front Page Farrell, John's Other Wife, Little Orphan Annie, Ma Perkins, Mr. Chameleon, Mr. Keen, Tracer of Lost Persons and Our Gal Sunday.

Backstage Wife debuted August 5, 1935, on the Mutual Broadcasting System, continued on NBC Radio and concluded on January 2, 1959 on CBS Radio. The sponsors included Dr. Lyons Tooth Powder and Procter & Gamble.

== Broadcast history ==
- August 5, 1935 – March 27, 1936, MBS, 9:45 a.m. ET
- March 30–June 26, 1936, NBC Blue, 4:15 p.m.
- 1936–1938, NBC Blue, 11:15 a.m.
- 1938–July 1, 1955, NBC, 4 p.m.
- July 4, 1955 – January 2, 1959, CBS, 12:15 p.m.

== In popular culture ==
The program was parodied by Bob and Ray as their continuing satirical soap opera, Mary Backstayge, Noble Wife, serialized for such a long period of time (from the late 1940s through the 1970s) that it became better known to many listeners than the show it lampooned. Ray Goulding played Mary Backstayge, as well as playwright Gregg Marlowe ("secretly" in love with Mary), neighbor Calvin L. Hoogevin and other characters, while Bob Elliott portrayed Harry Backstayge and stage doorman Pop Beloved. One of the best-remembered continuing plot threads in Mary Backstayge, Noble Wife was the characters opening and running a doomed-to-failure restaurant called The House Of Toast, which served only toast (and to drink, milkshakes).

In the Hogan's Heroes episode "The 43rd, A Moving Story", Hogan and Kinch find out from their secret radio that the bank is going to foreclose on Mary Noble, Backstage Wife.

== See also ==
- List of radio soaps
