= The Carters of Elm Street =

US radio program

- Genre: Soap opera
- Running time: 15 minutes
- Country of origin: United States
- Language(s): English
- Syndicates: NBC; Mutual
- Starring: Vic Smith; Virginia Payne
- Announcer: Pierre Andre
- Written by: Mona Kent
- Produced by: Frank Hummert; Anne Hummert
- Original release: February 13, 1939 – July 19, 1940
- Other themes: My Heart at Thy Sweet Voice
- Sponsored by: Ovaltine

The Carters of Elm Street is an American old-time radio soap opera. It was broadcast on NBC from February 13, 1939 to January 19, 1940 and on Mutual from January 22, 1940, to July 19, 1940.

== Background ==
The Carters of Elm Street began in the Chicago area in 1938 before it was broadcast nationally. It debuted on WMAQ on October 17, 1938, and was heard Monday-Friday at 11 a.m. Gulla Adams was the writer. Actors on the program included Viola Berwick, Bob Hardwick, Billy Rose, Anne Russel, Vic Smith, and Harriette Widmer.

== Premise ==
The program's daily opening summarized the show's premise: "the story of a second wife and her fight for happiness". The story focused on the Carter family, who lived on Elm Street, as reflected in the show's title. Mara Carter was the new wife who struggled for acceptance in the family. In addition to her husband, Jeff, the Carter family included son Jess, daughters Mildred and Bunny, and Mildred's husband, Sidney Randolph. The family also had a housekeeper, Mattie Belle.

The Carters of Elm Street was one of several radio soap operas (such as The Second Mrs. Burton and The Romance of Helen Trent) that used "the difficult role of stepmother ... for emphasizing the 'real-life' experiences of displacement within the family." Radio historian John Dunning described the program as "an attempt to capitalize on the success of such family-oriented soaps as The O'Neills and Pepper Young's Family".

== Carrie Carter Talent Search ==
A nationwide talent search in the spring of 1940 offered women an opportunity to appear on The Carters of Elm Street with two winners selected, one between ages 15 and 25 and the other over 25. Women who entered the contest could make a recording in any of the 85 cities in which the program was broadcast. They could read their own material or read from a script from the program. Local winners' recordings were forwarded to regional centers, with judges in Chicago selecting the national winners from those who survived regional competition.

Each winner received a two-week contract to be on the program at $112 per week with living expenses paid for the 14 days. The cost of travel to Chicago was also paid for the winners. Parts were written "to fit the acting ability and personality of the winners".

Virginia Payne inspired the contest as a way of helping women get a start in radio. More than 10,000 applicants submitted recordings, with Thelma Hansen of Lowell, Massachusetts, winning in the younger division and Ethel Chase Christie of Eugene, Oregon, winning in the older group. Actress Lillian Gish was one of the judges, as was Mona Kent, who wrote for the program. The other judges were a broadcast executive from WGN radio, a talent scout for MGM studio, and a columnist for Movie and Radio Guide magazine.

== Cast ==
Character	Actor	Ref.
Jeff Carter	Vic Smith	
Mara Carter	Virginia Payne	
Mildred Carter Randolph	Virginia "Ginger" Jones	
Bunny Carter	Ann Russell	
Jess Carter	William Rose	
Sidney Randolph	Herbert Nelson	
Mattie Belle	Harriette Widmer	

Pierre Andre was the announcer, and Mona Kent was the writer. Frank and Anne Hummert were the producers.
