= Hill Blackett =

American radio advertiser (1892–1967)

- Born: Vernive Hill Blackett; March 13, 1892; Juneau, Alaska, U.S.
- Died: December 6, 1967 (aged 75); Florida, U.S.
- Occupation: Radio daytime-advertising pioneer
- Title: Founder of Blackett & Sample advertising agency
- Political party: Republican National Committee
- Children: 2
- Parents: Charles S. Blackett (father); Alice R. Hill (mother)

Vernive Hill Blackett (March 13, 1892 – December 6, 1967) was a radio daytime-advertising pioneer who played a major part in the development of the soap opera.

== Life ==
Vernive Hill Blackett was born in Juneau, Alaska in 1892, the son of Charles S. Blackett, a lawyer and later a judge. His middle name derived from his mother, Alice R. Hill. At an early age he moved to Iowa to live with an uncle and aunt and in 1915 began his career with the advertising agency Lord & Thomas, now part of Draftfcb. In 1923, Blackett and John Glen Sample founded the Chicago advertising agency of Blackett & Sample, later renamed Blackett-Sample-Hummert after E. Frank Hummert joined it as a non-partner vice-president in 1927.

Throughout the 1930s and early 1940s, Blackett-Sample-Hummert were responsible for a succession of radio drama series, mostly produced by Hummert and his assistant Anne Ashenhurst, whom Hummert later married, including Little Orphan Annie, Just Plain Bill and Ma Perkins. In 1931, Blackett was able to state that his firm was "handling more than 150 broadcasts a week". and the agency, which numbered the consumer goods company of Procter & Gamble among its clients, rapidly became one of the largest buyers of radio time in the United States. In 1942, Time magazine described Blackett-Sample-Hummert as running "the biggest soap-opera factory in the world".

Blackett was a member of the Republican National Committee and guided the campaign of Alf Landon, who ran unsuccessfully against the incumbent Franklin D. Roosevelt in the 1936 US presidential election. His politics did not, however, stand in the way of business and in 1939 he collaborated with the President's son, Elliott Roosevelt, in attempting to place some of Blackett-Sample-Hummert's cheaper CBS and NBC serials for night-time broadcasting on smaller stations, including Elliott Roosevelt's Texas State Network. Time magazine was less than flattering, declaring: "Of all the enterprising Roosevelts, Elliott, in radio, naturally has the oddest messmates. Oddest of these for a Roosevelt to be hobnobbing with is a Chicago adman named Hill Blackett, mainly famous for having guided Alf Landon's campaign in 1936. The Blackett advertising agency, Blackett-Sample-Hummert, Inc., does the biggest business in radio: mostly sobby, low-cost network serials plugging household helps, headache remedies, beauty aids, etc. to U.S. housewives." When the project met with difficulties Elliott Roosevelt set up a new radio network, Transcontinental Broadcasting System, but resigned from the company in 1940 and the venture came to an end.

Hill Blackett ceased to participate in the management of Blackett-Sample-Hummert in 1942 when he was commissioned into the US Navy, though he remained a partner. The partnership was dissolved on 31 December 1943 and Blackett subsequently established his own agency, Hill Blackett, Inc. which in December 1947 alone generated more than $0.5M in billings. Sample formed the new partnership of Dancer Fitzgerald Sample.

Vernive Hill Blackett died in Florida in 1967 leaving a widow and two children.
