= Robert Hardy Andrews =

American novelist (1903–1976)

Charles Robert Douglas Hardy Andrews (October 19, 1903 – November 11, 1976) was a reporter, scriptwriter for radio, television, and movies, and author.

== Early life ==
Charles Robert Douglas Hardy Andrews was born on October 19, 1908, in Effingham, Kansas. He attended University of Minnesota, Northwestern University, and University of Chicago.

== Career ==
Andrews began his career as a reporter, then city editor for the Minneapolis Journal, then later, Chicago Daily News, and edited the newspaper's magazine Midweek.

He began writing radio soap operas when the noted producer team of Frank and Anne Hummert were impressed by Three Girls Lost, a work of serial fiction he had written for the Chicago Daily News. Andrews wrote the story in seven days, on a bet, writing 15,000 words per day. Three Girls Lost was later published as a novel, and was the basis for a 1931 movie of the same title, directed by Sidney Lanfield and starring Loretta Young and John Wayne. His novel Windfall: A Novel about Ten Million Dollars was the basis for the 1932 movie If I Had a Million, starring Gary Cooper and Charles Laughton, and Andrews was credited for the story and/or screenplay of 46 other movies over the next 30 years, including Bataan, The Cross of Lorraine, Girls of the Road and Salute to the Marines.

Andrews wrote many of the Hummerts' early radio soap operas, beginning with The Stolen Husband, and including Just Plain Bill, Judy and Jane and Ma Perkins. Andrews also wrote daytime radio serials for children, including Skippy, sponsored by General Mills, which helped make Wheaties cereal a household word. He was a prolific writer, for years averaging over 100,000 words of material per week. In one 20-hour period, he wrote 32,000 words. At his peak, he was writing seven daily radio dramas at the same time. He wrote from noon to midnight, seven days a week, smoking as many as five packs of cigarettes a day and drinking 40 cups of coffee. For Just Plain Bill alone, he wrote 2,600 scripts over a ten-year period. One time a week of air-mailed scripts for Just Plain Bill were lost in a plane crash and he had no copies, so he dictated a new script for a show over the telephone and a stenographer typed it out while the show was on the air, delivering it to the actors page by page.

== Television ==
He was a consultant on the CBS television series The Millionaire, which had the same premise as If I Had a Million, from Windfall: A Novel about Ten Million Dollars. Between 1954 and 1970, he wrote scripts for episodes of eight other television series, including Thriller and Death Valley Days.

== Works ==
=== Books ===
- Windfall: A Novel about Ten Million Dollars. John Day Company. 1930.
- Three Girls Lost (1930)
- One Girl Found (1930)
- Burning Gold (1945)
- Legend of a Lady: The Story of Rita Martin (1949)
- Great Day in the Morning (1950)
- A Corner of Chicago (1963)

=== Radio scripts ===
- Betty and Bob
- Just Plain Bill
- Judy and Jane
- Ma Perkins
- Skippy
- The Stolen Husband
- Terry and Mary

=== Film scripts ===
- Girls of the Road

=== TV scripts ===
- Death Valley Days

== Personal life ==
Colman Robert Hardy Andrews is the son of Robert Hardy Andrews and Irene Colman (née Bressette).
