= Thomas L. Thomas =

Welsh singer (1911–1983)

Thomas L. Thomas in a 1946 advertisement for RCA Victor

Thomas Llyfnwy Thomas (23 February 1911 – 17 April 1983) was a Welsh American baritone concert singer who achieved fame for his performances both in concert halls and on television and radio, most notably on The Voice of Firestone, where he was the most frequently featured singer. His concert repertoire included lieder, opera arias, ballads, spirituals and songs from musical theatre and operetta.

== Biography ==
Thomas was born in Maesteg, Wales, in 1911 and emigrated with his family to Scranton, Pennsylvania, when he was 12 years old. His father, Josiah, had been a notable musician who won the Eisteddfod three times and played the flute with the London Symphony Orchestra. His mother Mary Esther was also a talented singer and pianist. Tutored by their father, Thomas, his elder brother David ("Elwyn"), and his younger sister Gwyneth all learned singing at an early age. Thomas graduated from the technical school in Scranton, initially intending to become an engineering draughtsman. However, his plans changed in 1932 when he placed first at an Atwater Kent singing competition and then placed second in the national finals. Shortly after that, both he and his brother David won scholarships to study singing with Oscar Seagle in New York.

Thomas began making a name for himself on the concert circuit and in 1937 became the youngest singer and only Welshman to have won the Metropolitan Opera's annual radio auditions. The prize was $1000 and the offer of a seven-year contract with the company. He made his debut there on 15 May 1937 as Silvio in Pagliacci. The Mayor of Scranton was in the audience along with 1200 of the city's residents who had travelled to New York for the occasion. The performance was generally well received, but Thomas decided to turn down the contract and return to a concert career instead, believing himself to be too inexperienced to commit himself to a career at the Met. In 1941, he made one exception to his abandonment of the opera stage, when he sang the title role in Walter Damrosch's opera Cyrano, after Ezio Pinza had withdrawn from the production less than a month before the opening night. Damrosch had considerably re-written the opera since its 1913 premiere at the Met with Pasquale Amato as Cyrano. The revised version premiered in concert form at Carnegie Hall on 21 February 1941 with excellent reviews for Thomas who "revealed a fresh and voluminous voice". After the performances ended, Damrosch wrote to Thomas:

With your exquisite voice which you owe to your Welsh ancestors, and with your great artistry, you had already achieved a commanding position on the concert stage – but in your portrayal of 'Cyrano' you have developed so fine a perception of the requirements of opera, that that career is also open to you if ever you choose to undertake it.

Nevertheless, Thomas kept to his decision to pursue his career as a concert singer, and it was a phenomenally successful one. At its height, Thomas sang 60 live concerts a year in the United States and further afield in Canada, Wales, England, Germany, and Australia as well as performing on weekly radio broadcasts. For a time he was one of the highest paid concert artists in the United States. In 1948 and 1949 he hosted the weekly radio show, Your Song and Mine, produced by Frank and Anne Hummert and starred on their Manhattan Merry-Go-Round in its final years. He also became a fixture on the radio (and later television) program, The Voice of Firestone, where he appeared from 1942 until 1957. Many of his performances on The Voice of Firestone were released on VHS video in 2001 under the title Thomas L. Thomas in Opera and Song.

He kept up his connection with his native Wales throughout his life, returning there to sing in 1955, 1956, and 1958, and always including a Welsh song in his recitals. He made one last trip to Wales in 1978 when he was received into the Gorsedd of Bards for his distinguished contribution to Welsh culture. He also participated in the launch of the Welsh television channel, S4C in 1982, via a filmed interview in which he sang Nos Galan. He and his wife, Celia, had moved from New York to Scottsdale, Arizona, in the 1960s. In the ensuing years, he cut back his concert schedule and concentrated on informal lecture-recitals as well as teaching in Arizona colleges and in his private voice studio. Thomas died at his home in Scottsdale on 17 April 1983, aged 72.

== Sources ==
- Cox, Jim, Frank and Anne Hummert's Radio Factory: The programs and personalities of broadcasting's most prolific producers, McFarland, 2003. ISBN 0-7864-1631-9
- Historical Society of Pennsylvania, Thomas L. Thomas Papers 1924–1995, 2008 (accessed 29 April 2010)
- Jones, Bill, "Thomas, Thomas L. (Llyfnwy)" in Barkan, Elliott Robert (ed.), Making it in America: A sourcebook on eminent ethnic Americans, ABC-CLIO, 2001, pp. 375–376. ISBN 1-57607-098-0
- Metropolitan Opera, Performance record: Thomas, Thomas L. (Baritone), MetOpera Database (accessed 29 April 2010)
- New York Times, "Scranton Mayor Leads 1,200 Rooters Here To Hail Their Engineer-Singer in Opera Bow", 16 May 1937, p. 37
- New York Times, "Pinza and Novotna Quit 'Cyrano' Roles", 29 January 1941, p. 19
- New York Times, "David Thomas, Character Actor; In 2,148 'Fair Lady' Performances", 29 January 1981 (accessed 29 April 2010)
- Sanborn, Pitts, "Opera on Stage and Platform", Christian Science Monitor, 1 March 1941, p. 7
- Smith, Elizabeth, Voice of Firestone: Thomas L. Thomas in Opera and Song, Movies, All Media Guide, 2010 (accessed 29 April 2010)
- Thomas, Elfed and Thomas, Barabara, "Thomas Llyfnwy Thomas (1911–1983): Portrait of a Professional", Welsh Music/Cerddoriaeth Cymru , Vol. 8, No. 3 Autumn 1986, pp. 7–12 and Vol. 8, No. 4, Winter 1986, pp. 29–39. A combined version of these articles, updated by Charles Hooey, is published as Thomas Llyfnwy Thomas on Musicweb-International (accessed 29 April 2010)
- Wagner, Charles Ludwig, Seeing Stars, Ayer Publishing, 1977. ISBN 0-405-09714-X
- Wall Street Journal, "Metropolitan Notes", 17 May 1937
