= Manhattan Merry-Go-Round =

1932 NBC radio program

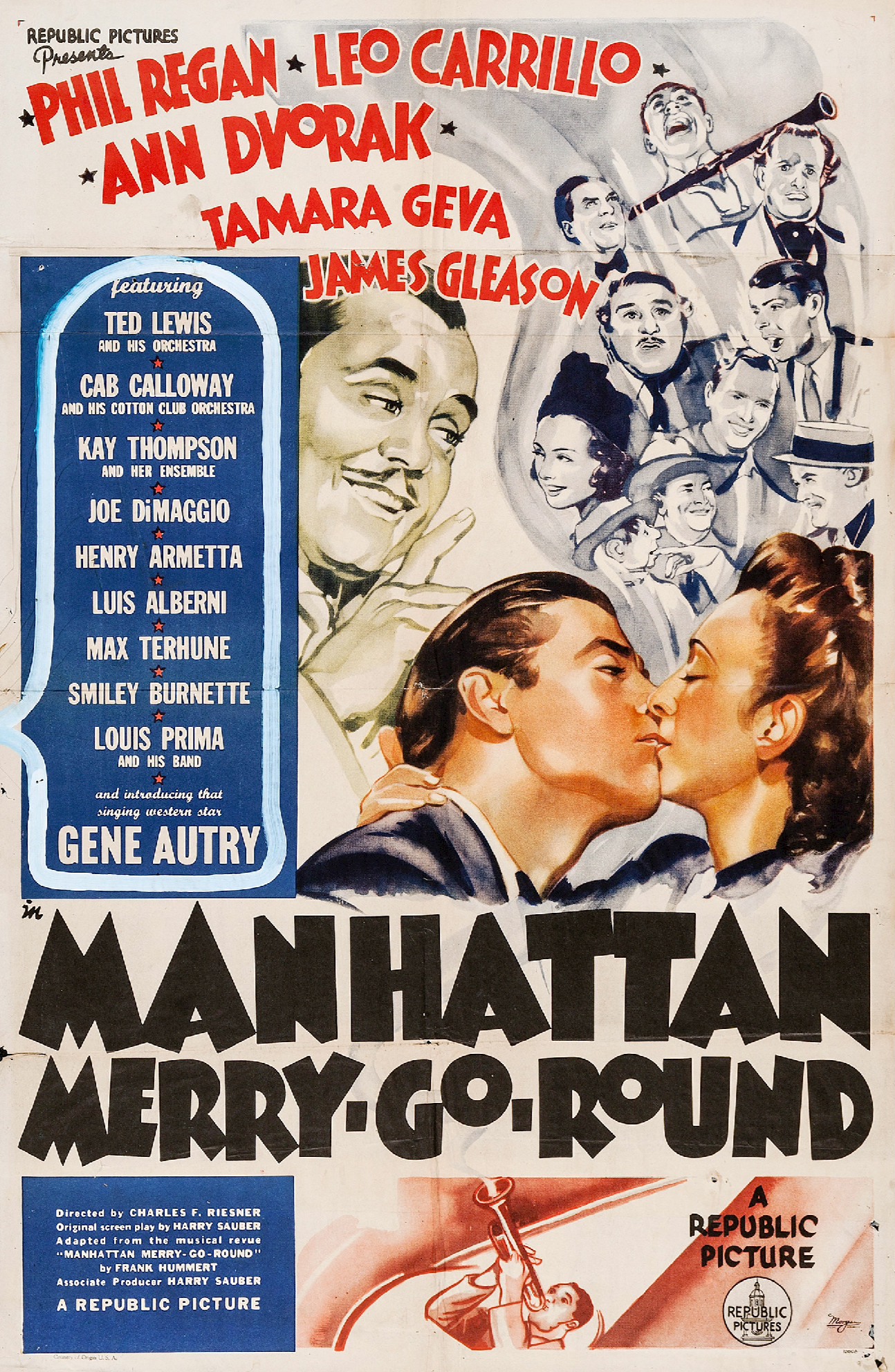
Manhattan Merry-Go-Round 1937 film poster. Note credit for Frank Hummert and the radio program.

Manhattan Merry-Go-Round is an NBC musical variety radio program that was broadcast from November 6, 1932, until April 17, 1949. The musical revue was produced by Frank and Anne Hummert. Sponsored by Dr. Lyon's Tooth Powder, the radio series was adapted by Frank Hummert and producer Harry Sauber into a 1937 musical comedy feature film for Republic Pictures.

== Radio ==
The program simulated visits to New York night clubs. In a similar format to Your Hit Parade, the top eight tunes of the week (a ranking based on the sales figures for records and sheet music) were performed by the orchestras of Andy Sannella and Victor Arden, with a line-up of vocalists that included Barry Roberts, Glenn Cross, Marian McManus and Thomas L. Thomas. The announcers were Ford Bond and Roger Krupp. The director was Paul Dumont.

The program began on November 6, 1932, on the NBC Blue Network, broadcast at 3:30 p.m. on Sunday afternoons. On April 9, 1933, it moved to the NBC Red Network, airing Sunday evenings at 9 p.m., when it was heard in the same hour as the Hummerts' other music program, The American Album of Familiar Music.

== Film ==
Charles Reisner directed the 1937 film, which was nominated for an Academy Award for Best Art Direction by John Victor Mackay.
