= Doc Barclay's Daughters =

American old-time radio soap opera

- Genre: Soap opera
- Running time: 15 minutes
- Country of origin: United States
- Language: English
- Syndicates: CBS
- Starring: Bennet Kilpack; Elizabeth Reller; Vivian Smolen; Mildred Robin; Albert Hays
- Announcer: Tom Shirley
- Written by: Charles S. Moore; John De Witt; Eleanor Berdon
- Original release: January 23, 1939 – January 19, 1940
- Sponsored by: Personal Finance Company

Doc Barclay's Daughters is an American old-time radio soap opera. It was broadcast on CBS from January 23, 1939, to January 19, 1940.

== Format ==
Despite his nickname, Doc Barclay was actually a druggist in Brookdale. The daughters referred to in the title were all grown women. Connie, the oldest, had returned home after a failed marriage to a "millionaire playboy." Mimi, the middle daughter and wife of a clerk at a hardware store, resented Connie's affluence. Marge, the youngest and unmarried, kept house for her father and was more stable than her sisters.

The series was one of many created by the husband-and-wife team of Frank and Anne Hummert. It was sponsored by Personal Finance Company, a loan service firm.

== Personnel ==
Bennet Kilpack had the role of Doc Barclay. Other members of the cast and their roles are shown in the table below.

Actor	Role
Mildred Robin	Mimi
Elizabeth Reller	Connie
Vivian Smolen	Marge
Carleton Young	Brett
Albert Hayes	Tom Clarke
Alan Bunce	Billy Van Cleve
Audrey Egan	Bess

Source: Variety Radio Directory (1940-1941)

Ann Leaf was the organist, and Tom Shirley was the announcer. Writers for the program included Charles S. Moore, John De Witt, and Eleanor Berdon.
