= Pierre Andre (announcer) =

Radio announcer (1899 – 1962)

- Born: Philip Litman; November 25, 1899; Duluth, Minnesota
- Died: July 21, 1962 (aged 62); Evanston, Illinois
- Education: University of Minnesota
- Occupation: Radio announcer

Pierre Andre (born Philip Litman; November 25, 1899 – July 21, 1962) was an announcer in the era of old-time radio.

== Early years ==
Born in Duluth, Minnesota, Andre was the son of Mr. and Mrs. Rae Litman. He won competitions in public speaking and dramatics while he was a student at the University of Minnesota. After college, he worked as an actor and a newspaperman.

== Radio ==
Andre's initial performance on radio, at WEBC in Duluth, Minnesota, resulted from his being invited to speak over the microphone at a studio party. His obituary in the Chicago Tribune reported, "His performance was so good that he immediately was engaged as an announcer." He went from WEBC to KSTP in St. Paul, where he worked for two years. He changed his name when he began working at KSTP.

Andre began working at WGN in Chicago, Illinois, on August 4, 1930, and stayed there for the rest of his career, with much of his work also broadcast nationally via network connections. He was one of the early announcers for soap operas when they began to become staples of daytime radio.

His obituary noted that he "introduced the first of the remote dance band broadcasts, the Midnight Flyers program from the Blackhawk restaurant." It also reported that he adapted to different types of programming as old-time radio formats disappeared, being replaced by talk shows and other genres.

Programs on which Andre was heard nationally as an announcer included Little Orphan Annie, Arnold Grimm's Daughter, Betty and Bob, Backstage Wife, Carters of Elms Street, Easy Aces, Sky King, Captain Midnight, How's the Family? and The Romance of Helen Trent.

== Death ==
Andre died of lympho-sarcoma on July 21, 1962, in Evanston, Illinois aged 62. He was survived by his wife, a son, a brother and a sister.

== In popular culture ==
Andre is portrayed in voice form by Jean Shepherd in the 1983 film A Christmas Story, in which Shepherd reenacts Andre relaying the secret code at the end of an episode of Little Orphan Annie.
