= Elizabeth Reller =

American actress

Elizabeth Reller (December 4, 1913 - July 14, 1974) was an American actress, best known for her work in old-time radio. She was active from 1935 until 1948.

== Early years ==
Reller was born in Richmond, Indiana, descended from a Quaker family whose roots went back to the early days of Wayne County, Indiana. She was active in Morton High School's Dramatic Club and studied dramatics at Swarthmore College for two years. She went on to graduate from the Royal Academy of Dramatic Art in England in 1935.

== Career ==
On Broadway, Reller appeared in Abe Lincoln in Illinois (1938) and Day in the Sun (1939).

Reller's roles on radio programs included those shown in the table below.

Program	Character
Armstrong's Theatre of Today	Quaker Girl
Betty and Bob	Betty Drake
Doc Barclay's Daughters	Connie
Michael and Kitty	Kitty
Portia Faces Life	Kathy Campbell
Young Doctor Malone	Ann Malone

She was also a supporting actress on The Amazing Mr. Smith and Joe Powers of Oakville.

== Personal life ==
In 1944, Reller married Dr. F. B. Warrick, a physician, in New York City. They moved to Richmond, Indiana, in 1948. After that move, she retired from acting. She taught a class in the local Religious Society of Friends church, and spoke on religious topics at meetings of groups in Richmond. She and her husband were lay leaders at religious retreats in a variety of places in the United States. She was also active in the Meals on Wheels program in Richmond.

== Death ==
On July 14, 1974, Reller died at University Hospital in Indianapolis, Indiana, at age 60.
