= Skippy (radio series) =

- Genre: Children's radio serial
- Running time: 15 minutes
- Country of origin: United States
- Language(s): English
- Home station: Mutual Broadcasting System
- Syndicates: CBS
- Starring: Franklin Adams, Jr. Francis Smith; St. John Terrell
- Announcer: Dwight Weist
- Original release: January 11, 1932 – March 29, 1935
- Sponsored by: Wheaties, Phillips' tooth paste

Skippy was an American children's radio serial based on the popularity of the comic strip Skippy. It was broadcast on CBS Radio from January 11, 1932 to March 29, 1935.

Skippy has been called the first radio serial for children, though the radio serial Little Orphan Annie (1930-1942) has also been given that honorific title.

In 1931 Franklin W. Adams was chosen to play the part of Skippy. Initially the show ran for 13 weeks locally in Chicago on WBBM Radio before being picked up for 2 years on NBC Radio followed by 2 more years on CBS Radio five days a week coast to coast.

As the principal player Adams was paid $75 per week at the beginning then raised to $100 per week when the show went national.

While on NBC the show was produced at 4:15PM and 5:15 PM in Studio B at Chicago's Merchandise Mart. Later it was produced on CBS in the Wrigley Building

"Skippy Day" was celebrated at the Chicago "Century of Progress" World's Fair in 1933. Skippy (Franklin Adams) and Sooky (Francis Smith) "gave a show at the amphitheater constructed next to the Burnham Lagoon".

Note; There is an erroneous ledger reference online that refers to the character of Skippy as being spoken by Franklin Adams, Jr.. Franklin W. Adams who portrayed Skippy was not a junior. In fact his father's name was Elmer. This was presumably mistyped at the time.

== Concept ==
Skippy was a popular gag-a-day comic strip, written and drawn by Percy Crosby. The 1932 radio serial was an audio play based on the adventures of this mischievous little boys. The scripts were written by Robert Hardy Andrews. Production was in hands of Frank Hummert and Anne Hummert. Each episode was 15 minutes long. The series was cancelled in 1935.

== Cast ==
- Skippy: Franklin W. Adams
- Sooky: Francis Smith
- Jim: St. John Terrell
- Announcer: Dwight Weist
- Writer: Robert Andrews
- Director: David Owen and later Ray Appleby
