= Betty Ruth Smith =

American actress

Betty Ruth Smith (May 25, 1915 – February 1, 2008) was an American actress best known for her work in old-time radio.

== Early years ==
The daughter of Mr. and Mrs. Sloan H. Smith and a native of Wichita, Kansas, Smith began taking drama lessons when she was five years old. By 1922, she was "well known to theater patrons" when she performed a dance number in a musical program at the Wichita Theater.

She acted on the campus radio station at the University of Kansas, from which she graduated in 1937. While she was a student at the university, students chose her as Homecoming Queen and Intercollegiate Festival Queen. She also acted in Little Theater productions in Wichita.

== Career ==
After her college graduation, Smith took a job at radio station KFH in Wichita, having leading parts on The Phantom Theater, Parlor Playhouse, and other programs. While there, she also learned to write for radio. After 18 months on that station, she took a vacation in Chicago and auditioned successfully for NBC radio while she was there. In Chicago, she began working on network radio programs. In 1943, she became the star of The Romance of Helen Trent, a popular CBS soap opera. She had temporarily filled that role in 1942 when the star, Virginia Clark, had a baby.

Besides her work on Helen Trent, Smith's other roles on network radio programs included those shown in the table below.

Program	Role
Doctors at Work	Alice Riggs
Judy and Jane	Jane Lee
Lone Journey	Nita Bennett
Road of Life	Judith
Vic and Sade	Crisco Spokeswoman
Woman in White	Karen Adams

She was also heard on Backstage Wife, Stepmother, and Mary Marlin.

In 1942, Smith was designated the "radio actress with the most beautiful eyes."

== Personal life and death ==
In 1943, Smith married U. S. Naval Reserve Lieutenant Junior Grade Robert Francis Zech. In 1951, they relocated to Dallas, where she became active in community affairs, serving as lay reader at St. Michael and All Angels Episcopal Church. She also sat on the boards of the local Junior League, the Dallas Museum of Art, and of PBS member station KERA-TV, on whose behalf she was an especially vocal advocate.

On February 1, 2008, in Fort Wayne, Indiana, Betty Ruth Zech died at age 92, preceded in death by her husband and survived by their three children.
