= Toni Darnay =

American actress and dancer

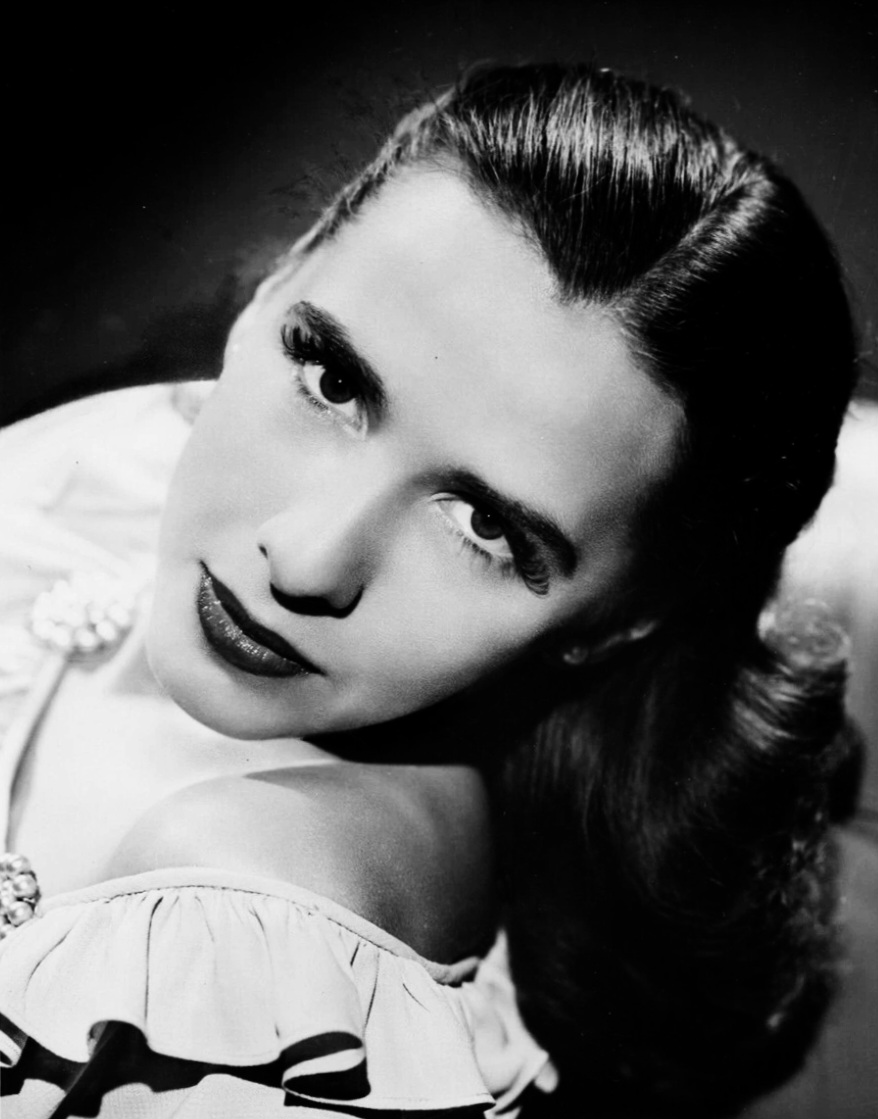
- Darnay in 1946
- Born: Mercy Mustell; April 11, 1921; Chicago, Illinois, U.S.
- Died: January 5, 1983 (aged 61); New York City, U.S.
- Occupations: Actress, dancer
- Spouse(s): Elwood Hoffman (m. 1947; died 1962) Hobe Morrison (m. 1964)
- Children: 2

Toni Darnay (born Mercy Mustell, April 11, 1921 – January 5, 1983) was an American actress and dancer.

== Early years ==
Darnay was born in Chicago, Illinois. Her father, Robert R. Mustell, was a doctor, and her mother had acted in silent films and on stage in theaters owned by Darnay's grandfather, Landon Gates. She attended College Prep High School in Chicago, and at the Chicago Art Theatre she studied acting, dancing, and singing. As a youngster, she danced in clubs, including The Palmer House and Chez Paree and performed in vaudeville, repertory theater, and summer stock but often found her ventures ended by her father. After taking night classes for a year at Northwestern University (often dashing from the campus to a night club to dance), she went to New York, looking for work on Broadway at age 19.

== Career ==
In Chicago in 1940, Darnay was a member of Winnie Hoveler's Dancing Darlings, performing in the floor show at Harry's New Yorker.

Darnay acted in stock theater companies at Oconomowac Walk, Wisconsin, and Bridgehampton, Long Island, among other places. She toured with a company of Arsenic and Old Lace, as the ingenue lead, and acted in Black Narcissus, The Duenna, and Name Your Own Poison. On Broadway, Darnay danced in Sadie Thompson (1944), was an understudy in The Women (1973), and was both a performer and an understudy in Molly (1973), The Heiress (1976), and Vieux Carre (1977). Other stage productions in which she performed included The Heiress, Life with Father, Molly, and The Women.

While Darnay was in an out-of-town opening for her first Broadway play, she auditioned for, and won, the title role in the radio serial The Strange Romance of Evelyn Winters, which ran on CBS from November 20, 1944, to November 12, 1948. She also acted on other radio soap operas, including starring as Nona Dutell on Nona from Nowhere, and playing Sylvia Field in When a Girl Marries, Libby Allen on Stella Dallas, and Nancy on Just Plain Bill. She was also heard regularly on Aunt Jenny's Real Life Stories on radio and appeared frequently on television programs. Her work on TV included Eleanor and Franklin, nine Hallmark Hall of Fame programs, and several soap operas, including running roles in The Doctors, The Edge of Night and Search for Tomorrow.

Darnay also appeared in films, including The Exorcist, Pendulum, and The Swimmer.

== Personal life ==
Darnay was married to writer Elwood (Bill) Hoffman from March 1947 until his death in January 1962. They had two children, including noted defense attorney Darnay Hoffman. In 1964, she married theatrical columnist Hobe Morrison, and they remained wed until her death.

== Death ==
On January 5, 1983, Darnay died of lung cancer at her home in Manhattan at age 61.
