= Kay Campbell =

American actress

- Born: Catherine Campbell; August 12, 1904; Kansas City, Missouri, US
- Died: May 27, 1985 (aged 80); Greenwich, Connecticut, US
- Occupations: American radio and television actress

Catherine "Kay" Campbell (August 12, 1904 – May 27, 1985) was an American actress.

== Early years ==
Campbell began her career as a model in Chicago, and she was a graduate of the University of Chicago.

== Radio ==
In 1937, Campbell starred in Lucky Girl, a drama broadcast on WGN. She was one of a "cast of outstanding Chicago radio talent" that performed The Living Bible, a weekly program that began September 24, 1939, on WGN. In 1948, she began playing Lola Conway in Katie's Daughter on NBC.

She played Laura Richardson on Lonely Women in 1942-1943 and Evey Perkins on Ma Perkins from 1945 to 1960 and was a member of the casta of The Flying Patrol in 1941-1942 and Sweet River in 1943–1944.

== Television ==
Her first regular televised serial role was as Helene Benedict on The Guiding Light from 1957 until 1964. She went on to play Rose Pollock #3 on The Edge of Night.

She had retired following her role on The Edge of Night but she was coaxed out of retirement by soap opera writer and producer Agnes Nixon, who had created the role of "Kate" especially for Kay Campbell on the soap opera All My Children. Contrary to popular belief, she was not the first actress to play the role. Kate Harrington originated the character, was recast with Christine Thomas, who was in turn recast with Campbell. She portrayed Kate Martin from mid-1970 to her death in 1985.

== Publishing ==
From 1962 to 1970, Campbell was publisher of the New York Athletic Club Magazine.

== Union ==
In 1946, Campbell was elected to the board of directors of the Chicago chapter of the American Federation of Radio Artists.

== Death ==
On May 27, 1985, Campbell died at Greenwich Hospital in Greenwich, Connecticut. Her death at age 80 followed her being injured in an automobile accident. She was survived by a son, four grandchildren, and five great-grandchildren.
