= Franc Hale =

American actress

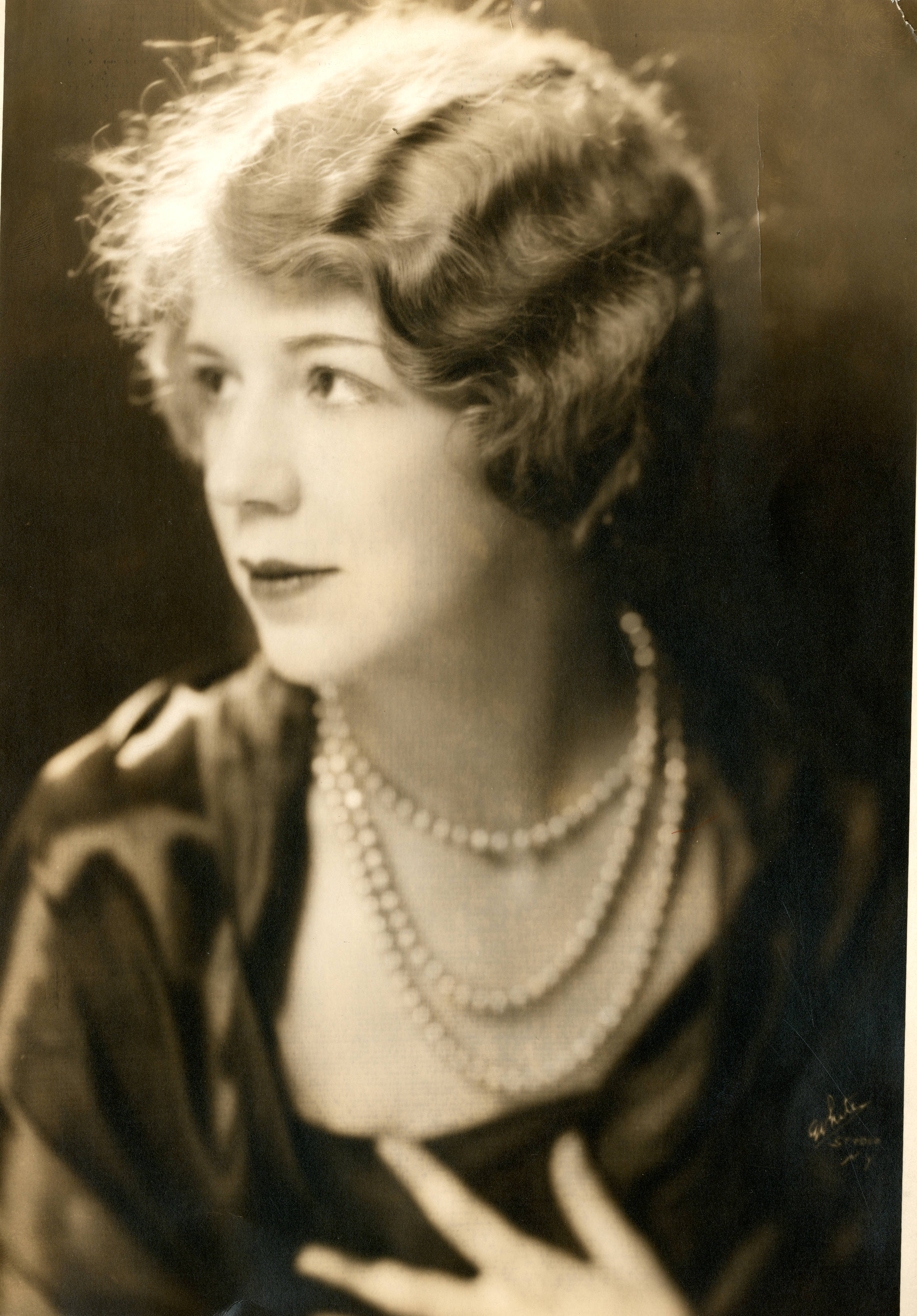
Hale in 1929

Franc Hale (born 1905 or 1906 – June 10, 1986) was an American actress.

== Early years ==
Hale was a native of Tacoma. The spelling of her first name was a compromise after she was born, because her parents had been expecting a boy. They had chosen "Frank" as the name, but it no longer seemed appropriate. Her mother did not favor "Frances" as a compromise, so they settled on "Franc", pronounced the same as "Frank".

Hale played piano from an early age, and when she was 5 years old, one of her performances led to Tacoma newspapers commenting on her talents as a prodigy. She graduated from Miss Hansom's School for Girls, and her performances in school plays developed her desire to be an actress. Her parents, however, wanted her to be a writer, so she had to change their minds. "I finally convinced them", she said, "that in order to write plays I should have some working knowledge of the stage".

== Career ==
Hale's early acting experience came in stock theater, beginning in Portland and later touring in a production of Ma Pettingill with a company headed by May Robson, who had seen Hale perform in a school program, leading to Hale's debut as a professional. By age 22, she had played 50 roles on stage, with the characters' ages ranging from 12 to 60. For more than five years, she was the leading lady with Walker Whiteside's theatrical company.

Hale's Broadway credits include The Arabian (1927), The Royal Box (1928), Sakura (1928, Three Men and a Woman (1932), and Late Wisdom (1934). On radio, Hale played Dale Arden on The Amazing Interplanetary Adventures of Flash Gordon, Annette Rogers on John's Other Wife and Shanghai Lil on Jungle Jim. She also was featured on Second Husband, Aunt Jenny, Our Gal Sunday, and Young Doctor Malone.

== Personal life and death ==
Hale was married to screenwriter Frank Gabrielson. She died on June 10, 1986, in Santa Monica, California.
