= Jim Cox (historian) =

American historian

Jim Cox, a retired college professor living in Louisville, Kentucky, is a leading historian on the subject of radio programming in the 20th century. He has written extensively on the history of radio from the 1920s to the present.

== Books ==
Through McFarland & Company and Scarecrow Press, Cox has published more than 15 books, including the recent Radio Speakers: Narrators, News Junkies, Sports Jockeys, Tattletales, Tipsters, Toastmasters and Coffee Klatch Couples Who Verbalized the Jargon of the Aural Ether from the 1920s to the 1980s—A Biographical Dictionary (2007). The book profiles of more than 1,100 "radio speakers", including Red Barber, H. V. Kaltenborn, Dorothy Kilgallen, Edward R. Murrow, Louella Parsons and Walter Winchell.

Other books by Cox include The Daytime Serials of Television, 1946–1960 (2006), Historical Dictionary of American Radio Soap Operas (2005), Music Radio (2005), Mr. Keen, Tracer of Lost Persons (2004), Frank and Anne Hummert’s Radio Factory (2003), Radio Crime Fighters (2002), Say Goodnight, Gracie: The Last Years of Network Radio (2002), The Great Radio Audience Participation Shows (2001), The Great Radio Soap Operas (1999) and Rails Across Dixie (2011).

== Awards ==
At the Friends of Old Time Radio Convention, vintage radio's largest annual event, Cox was the recipient of the 2002 Ray Stanich Award, given annually for prolific research and writing on the subject of old time radio. Cox is a frequent guest at the Mid-Atlantic Nostalgia Convention, held annually in Aberdeen, Maryland.

While Cox contributes to vintage radio club newsletters and nostalgia periodicals, his range of interests also includes travel, railroads, swimming, baseball, history and government. An active churchman, husband, father and grandfather, he volunteers weekly with charitable organizations. In 2007, Cox received the Stone-Waterman Award presented by the Cincinnati Old Time Radio and Nostalgia Convention for outstanding contributions to the preservation of old time radio history.
