= Betty and Bob =

Radio soap opera (1932–1940)

- Genre: Soap opera
- Running time: 15 minutes
- Country of origin: United States
- Language(s): English
- Syndicates: Blue Network; CBS; NBC
- Starring: Elizabeth Reller; Don Ameche; Edith Davis
- Created by: Frank Hummert; Anne Ashenhurst
- Written by: Robert Hardy Andrews
- Produced by: Frank and Anne Hummert
- Original release: October 10, 1932 – March 15, 1940
- No. of series: 8
- Opening theme: Salut d'Amour
- Sponsored by: General Mills' Wheaties and Bisquick

Betty and Bob is a 1932-1940 radio soap opera. The soap opera follows the lives of Betty and Bob Drake. Betty was a secretary who falls madly in love with her boss, bachelor Bob Drake. The two wed and each day, the subject matter dealt with everything from love to hate, jealousy to divorce, murder to betrayal, and collusion to insanity.

The program was the first radio program produced by future daytime radio monarchs Frank and Anne Hummert. The program also began a long partnership between the Hummerts and scriptwriter Robert Hardy Andrews.

The program originally starred Elizabeth Reller and Don Ameche in the title roles of Betty and Bob Drake. The role of Bob Drake is credited as furthering Ameche's status as a sex symbol; he became the "first radio sex symbol" through his work on The First Nighter. But during the program's eight-year run, four other actresses, including Arlene Francis, portrayed Betty and seven other actors, including Les Tremayne, portrayed Bob.

According to author John Dunning, ratings for the soap opera plummeted after the addition of Drake's son Little Bobby. "Raymond William Stedman speculates that listeners refused to accept bickering and jealousy when a child was involved." Little Bobby died of pneumonia and the Drakes divorced. But ratings never did pick up again. The last few years of the program centered on how Betty and Bob grieve over the loss of their son, Bob's relationship with his new girlfriend Pamela Talmadge (portrayed by Ethel Kuhn), and Bob's time in and out of a mental institution.

The program premiered on the Blue Network on October 10, 1932. The program moved to CBS then to NBC's Red Network where the series finished on March 15, 1940. The program was sponsored by both the Wheaties and Bisquick divisions of the General Mills company.

== Cast and characters ==
- Elizabeth Reller, Beatrice Churchill, Alice Hill, Mercedes McCambridge and Arlene Francis as secretary Betty Drake.
- Don Ameche, Les Tremayne, Vinton Hayworth, Onslow Stevens, Spencer Bentley, Carl Frank, J. Anthony Hughes and Van Heflin as Bob Drake
- Edith Davis as May Drake, Bob's mother, and Gardenia, Bob's negro servant.
- Herbert Nelson and Eleanor Dowling as Carl and Ethel Grainger, friends of the Drakes.
- Ethel Kuhn as Pamela Talmadge, Bob's next girlfriend after his divorce.
- Bill Bouchey as Harvey Drew.
- Frankie Pacelli as Little Bob Drake, son of Betty and Bob.

== Broadcast history ==
- Weekdays at 3:00–3:15 pm on the Blue Network: October 10, 1932 – May 29, 1936
- Weekdays at 10:00–10:15 am on CBS: June 1, 1937 – May 27, 1938
- Weekdays at 2:00–2:15 pm on NBC: May 30, 1938 – March 15, 1940
