= Dancer Fitzgerald Sample =

American advertising agency

Dancer Fitzgerald Sample (DFS)
- Company type: Private
- Industry: Advertising
- Founded: 1923
- Defunct: 1987
- Fate: Acquired by Saatchi & Saatchi
- Successor: Saatchi & Saatchi DFS (renamed back to Saatchi & Saatchi later on)
- Headquarters: New York City, United States
- Subsidiaries: The Program Exchange (1979–1987)

Dancer Fitzgerald Sample (DFS and later DFS-Dorland) was a Madison Avenue advertising agency during the 20th century. It was founded in Chicago in 1923, and was acquired and merged into the Saatchi & Saatchi network in the 1980s.

== History ==
The agency was founded in 1923 by Hill Blackett and John Glen Sample, in Chicago. E. Frank Hummert joined the agency in 1927, and it was renamed Blackett–Sample–Hummert, even though Hummert was never a partner in the company. Blackett left company management, despite remaining a partner, when he was commissioned into the U.S. Navy in 1942. Hummert left the company at the end of 1943, forming Hummert Radio Productions with his wife Anne. Sample, after unsuccessful attempts to buy out the absent Blackett, announced that they would allow the firm to dissolve when their partnership agreement expired in 1944, and that he would enter a new partnership with B-S-H president Howard M. "Mix" Dancer at that time. These plans were later altered to terminate the partnership earlier, on January 1, 1944, with Blackett forming his own firm and Dancer and Sample adding as a partner Clifford L. Fitzgerald, then a B-S-H vice president and director. Sample left the agency in 1948 and moved full-time to Florida, where he became a real-estate developer; Dancer died while on vacation in Antigua in 1958. The company itself moved from Chicago to New York in 1948 to be closer to the center of the television business.

Dancer Fitzgerald entered the European market in 1970, joining forces with the UK firm Dorland Advertising Holdings to form DFS-Dorland International through an exchange of stock among the two companies' owners. The combined firms reported $237 million in revenues at the time. DFS unwound its interests in DFS-Dorland International in 1979, while maintaining business connections with the London firm.

DFS purchased Val-Mar Studios, a Mexican animation studio in 1959, and became Gamma Productions. It used the studio to produce television cartoons for Jay Ward Productions and Total Television; the studio closed in 1968. Its productions remain in reruns, distributed through The Program Exchange. DFS founded Program Syndication Services in 1973 and The Program Exchange in 1979. DFS acquired the much smaller Gilbert, Felix & Sharf agency in 1979. That same year, DFS left its long-time 347 Madison Avenue office space and two other Manhattan locations to consolidate in the Chrysler Building.

After three years of discussions, on February 24, 1986, Saatchi & Saatchi agreed to fund a $75 million management buyout of Dancer Fitzgerald Sample, under which five DFS managers would create a new company, DFS Management, to buy out the company's 202 shareholders, ultimately merging the new company with Saatchi's much smaller Dorland Advertising under the name DFS Dorland Worldwide. The deal was structured to avoid conflicts of interest between Dancer Fitzgerald's and Saatchi's client bases, but Saatchi & Saatchi would have the option to take complete control at any time. At that time, Dancer Fitzgerald Sample was the thirteenth largest advertising agency in the US, with billings of $876 million and clients including Procter & Gamble, General Mills, Toyota, Sara Lee and RJR Nabisco. The new DFS Dorland Worldwide network was to be operated independently from the Saatchi & Saatchi Compton Worldwide network and was at that time the sixteenth largest agency network in the world.

Saatchi & Saatchi announced on June 22, 1987, that the DFS/Dorland merger would be unwound, and it would pay $25 million to buy out the remaining minority shareholders and merge DFS with its other US unit, Saatchi & Saatchi Compton. At that point the merged business became the largest agency in New York with billings of $2.3 billion. The consolidation ended DFS's relationship with Dorland, which at that point was the third-largest London agency.

== Legacy ==
In 1979, DFS created McGruff the Crime Dog.

A famous line to come out of DFS in the 1980s was the pop-culture hit "Where's the beef?" created for Wendy's by DFS creative director Cliff Freeman.

In 1973, they created the Duracell Bunny, which has become an icon in all countries except the United States and Canada.

== See also ==
- The Program Exchange
