= Arthur Hughes (American actor) =

American actor (1894–1982)

- Born: June 24, 1894; Bloomington, Illinois, U.S.
- Died: December 28, 1982 (aged 88); New York City, U.S.

Arthur Hughes (June 24, 1894 – December 28, 1982) was an American actor on the stage, radio and films. On Broadway, he performed in two dozen plays between 1923 and 1968, including Mourning Becomes Electra (1931–32) and Elizabeth the Queen (1930–31). On television he appeared in The DuPont Show of the Week and Playhouse 90.

== Career ==
Hughes played Steven Dallas on the radio soap opera Stella Dallas and was perhaps best known as title character Bill Davidson on the long-running daytime radio serial, Just Plain Bill. He also acted in other well-known radio programs such as the Fu Manchu Mysteries and Mr. Keen, Tracer of Lost Persons. During the 1960s, he appeared in several TV movies. He also appeared in films, including The Great Gatsby (1974) and Woody Allen's Bananas (1971).

Hughes and Edward Pawley, of Big Town fame, were good friends. They were roommates in their early years in New York City where they were appearing in Broadway plays. They appeared together in a popular Broadway production titled Subway Express (1929). Hughes was a witness at Pawley's marriage to his first wife, stage actress Martina May Martin, in 1922.
