= Vivian Fridell =

American actress (1912–1998)

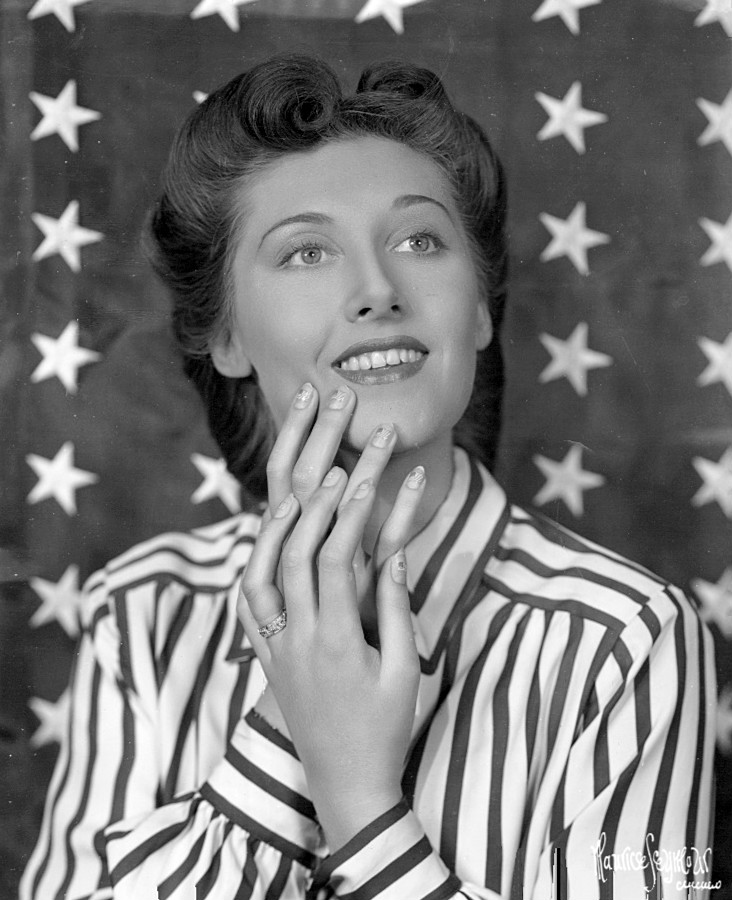
- Born: Vivian Naomi Fridell; October 15, 1912; Milwaukee, Wisconsin, U.S.
- Died: August 20, 1998 (aged 85); Wilmette, Illinois, U.S.
- Education: University of Wisconsin
- Occupation: Actress
- Spouses: Gerritt James de Gelieke; Benjamin Solomon
- Children: 1

Vivian Naomi Fridell (October 15, 1912 - August 20, 1998) was an American actress who worked on radio.

== Early years ==
Fridell was born in Milwaukee, Wisconsin. Her father was a Swedish actor, and three of her uncles were entertainers in Sweden. Fridell operated an adding machine in a Milwaukee bank before she went to college. She graduated from the University of Wisconsin's radio school, and she produced and wrote programs while she was there. She was a member of the Wisconsin Players and president of Phi Mu sorority.

== Career ==
One of Fridell's earliest jobs in radio was working as announcer on a three-day-a-week, 15-minute musical program on WGN in Chicago. She had the lead role of Mary Noble in the radio soap opera Backstage Wife from the show's debut in 1935 until production of the program moved from Chicago to New York in June 1945. She also starred on Road of Life, Wife vs. Secretary, and The Affairs of Anthony.

After Fridell left acting, she taught drama to teenage students from her home in Glencoe, Illinois.

== Personal life and death ==
Fridell was married to Gerritt James de Gelieke, a representative for Johns-Manville. Their home was in Madison, Wisconsin, but she spent five days a week in Chicago with her work on radio. She later married Benjamin Solomon, and they had a daughter. She died on August 20, 1998, in her home in Wilmette, Illinois, aged 85.
