= Edith Luckett Davis =

Mother of Nancy Reagan (1888–1987)

Edith Davis
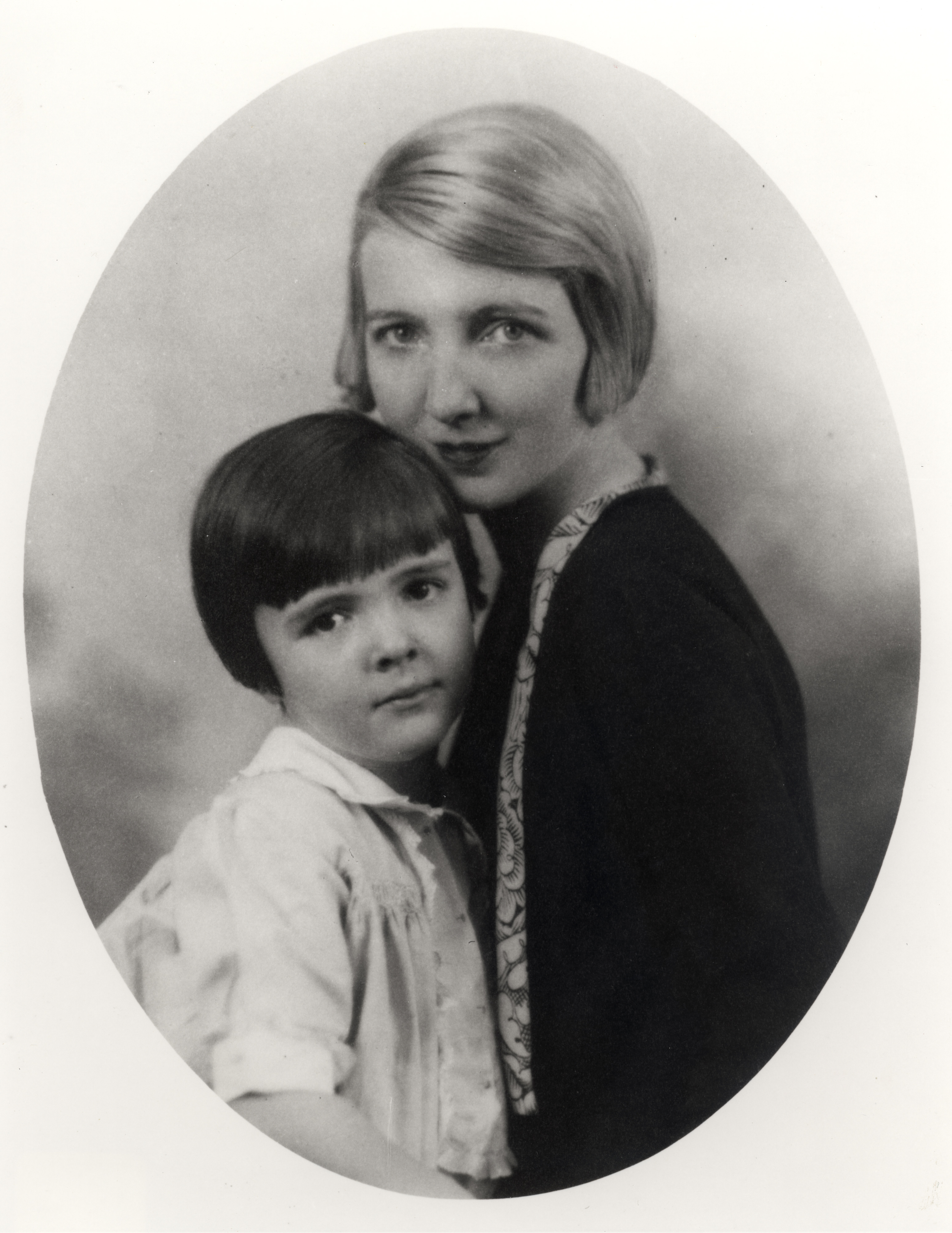
- Edith Luckett Davis with her daughter, Nancy, 1920s
- Born: Edith Prescott Luckett; July 16, 1896; Petersburg, Virginia, U.S.
- Died: October 26, 1987 (aged 91); Phoenix, Arizona, U.S.
- Occupation: Actress
- Spouses: Kenneth Seymour Robbins (m. 1916; div. 1928) Loyal Edward Davis (m. 1929; died 1982)
- Children: Nancy Reagan

Edith Prescott Davis (née Luckett; July 16, 1896 – October 26, 1987) was an American film and Broadway stage actress in the 1900s through the 1920s. She was the mother of Nancy Reagan, First Lady of the United States from 1981 to 1989, and mother-in-law of President Ronald Reagan.

== Early life ==
Edith Prescott Luckett, nicknamed "Lucky", was born in Petersburg, Virginia, the ninth and last child of Sarah Frances (née Whitlock) and Charles Edward Luckett.

She grew up in Washington, D.C., as her father worked for the Adams Express Company. She was known for her vivacious and outgoing personality and style.

== Acting career ==
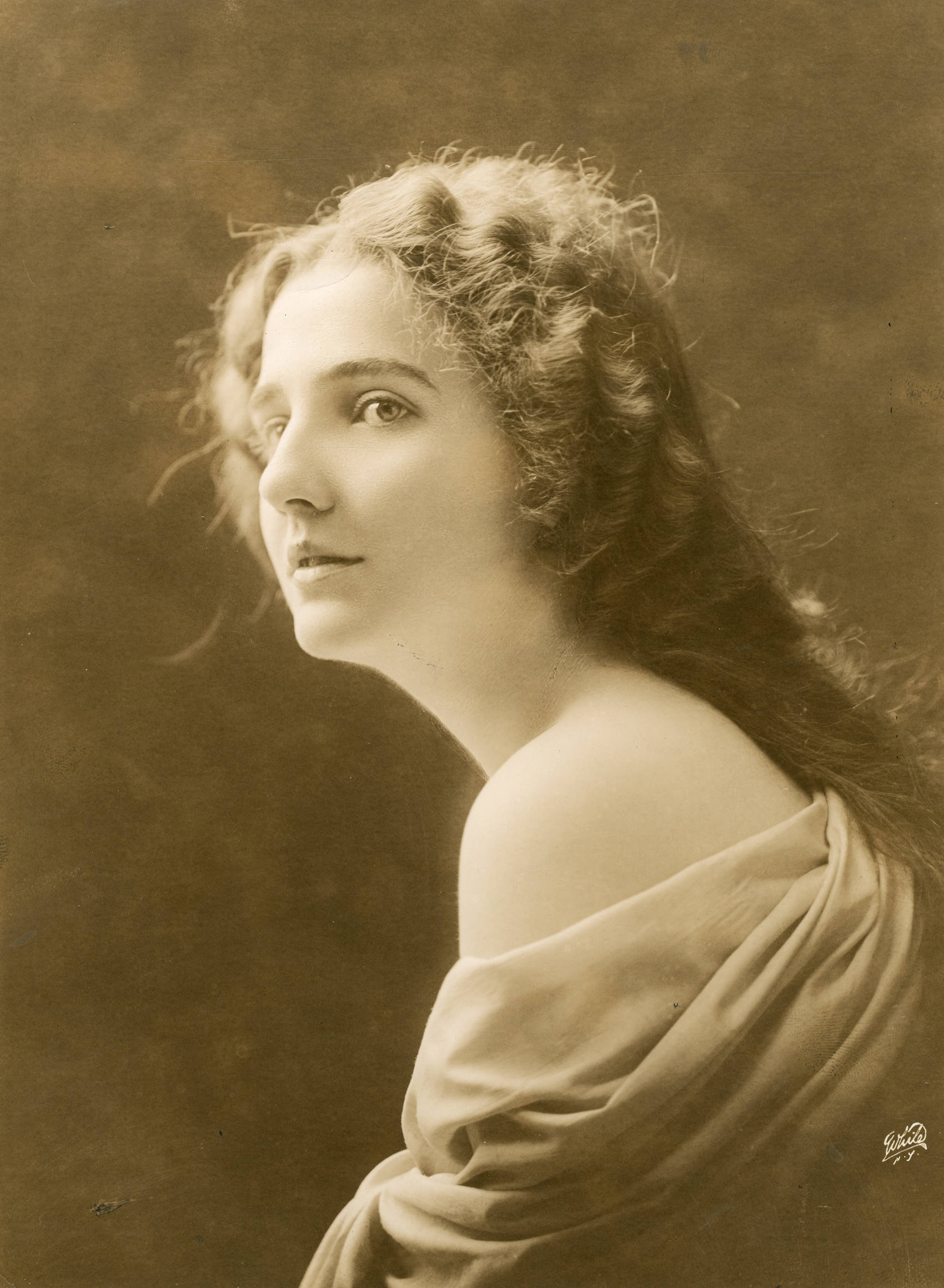
Edith Luckett c. 1913

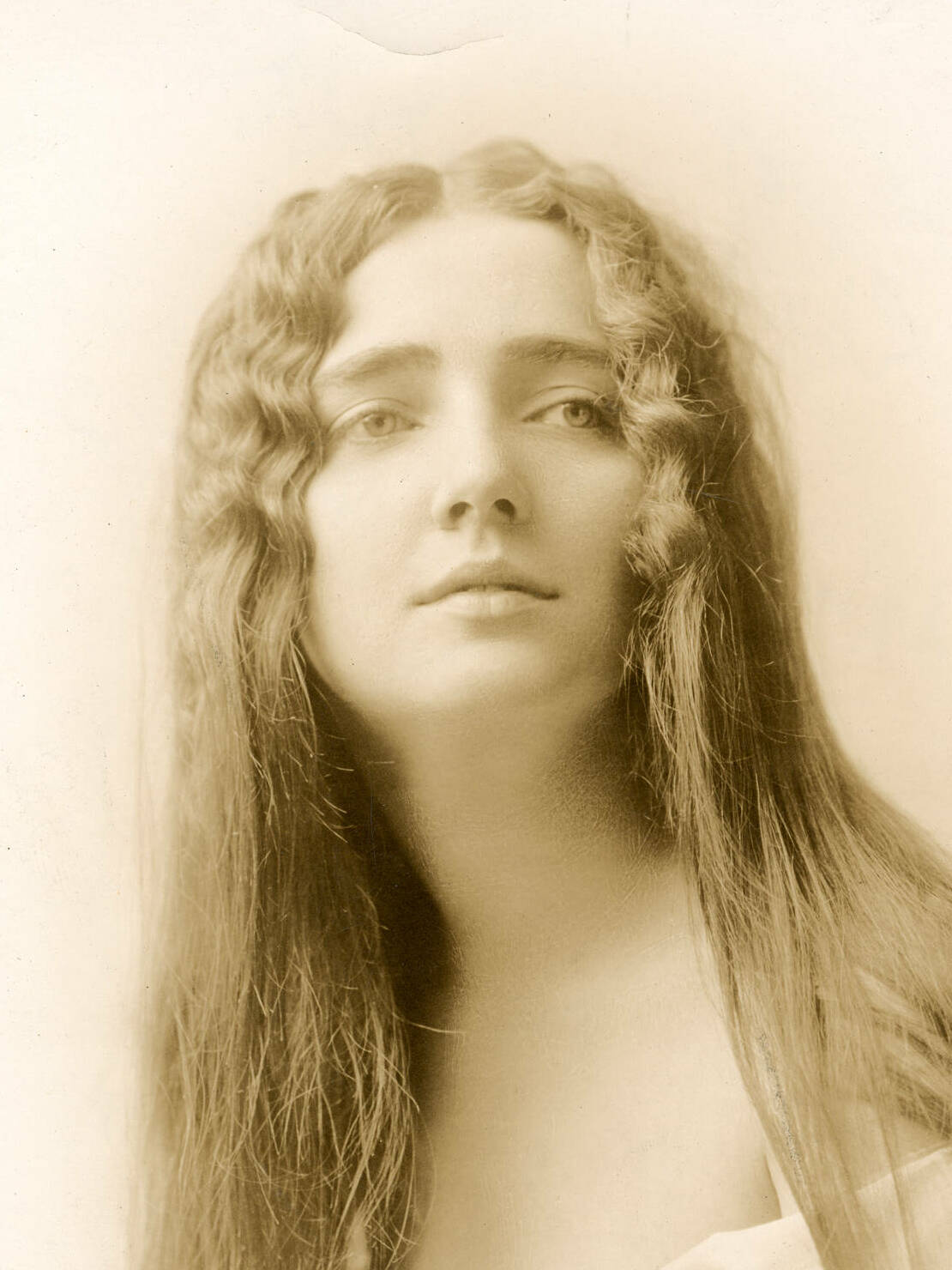
Edith Luckett in 1923

Davis began acting on the stage, in Baltimore, at the age of 13. At 18, she moved to New York City. She appeared in several films, including The Other Girl (1915). She acted on stage, most notably on Broadway, but also with several regional stock companies. She performed and became friends with such stars as Walter Huston, George M. Cohan and Spencer Tracy. Other friends in the business included Zasu Pitts, Louis Calhern, David Belasco and Alla Nazimova. Her last role on Broadway, was in 1928, with Walter Huston and Kay Francis in Elmer the Great.

== Personal life ==
=== First marriage ===
Davis married Kenneth Seymour Robbins of Pittsfield, Massachusetts, in 1916. The couple had one daughter, christened Anne Frances Robbins, but known as Nancy. The couple separated soon after Nancy's birth, and later divorced. Because of Davis continuing in her acting career, she arranged to have her daughter live with her sister's family in Bethesda, Maryland, while she toured the East Coast with acting troupes. She would visit her daughter in Maryland when time allowed.

=== Second marriage ===
While on a sea voyage to the United Kingdom in 1928, Edith met Loyal Edward Davis, a pioneering Chicago neurosurgeon. The two were married on May 21, 1929. She moved to Chicago with Nancy, where Edith performed on many radio programs as Edith Luckett Davis. Loyal adopted Nancy when she was 17, legally changing her name to Nancy Davis. Davis had one son, Richard, from his first marriage; Richard came to live with the family in 1939 after his mother, Pearl McElroy, a nurse, died of cancer. In 1932, Loyal Davis was appointed Chairman of the Department of Surgery at his alma mater, the Northwestern University Medical School in Chicago, a position he held until 1963.

Edith became heavily involved in community and charity work. She organized the gift shop and served on the board at Passavant Hospital and worked with the Women's Division of the Chicago Charity Fund, eventually becoming chairwoman, serving in that position from 1938 to 1963. While living in Chicago, she saw Nancy move to California, become an actress in her own right, and marry fellow actor Ronald Reagan. Every year, Reagan would send flowers to Edith on Nancy's birthday to thank her for giving birth to Nancy.

=== Later years ===
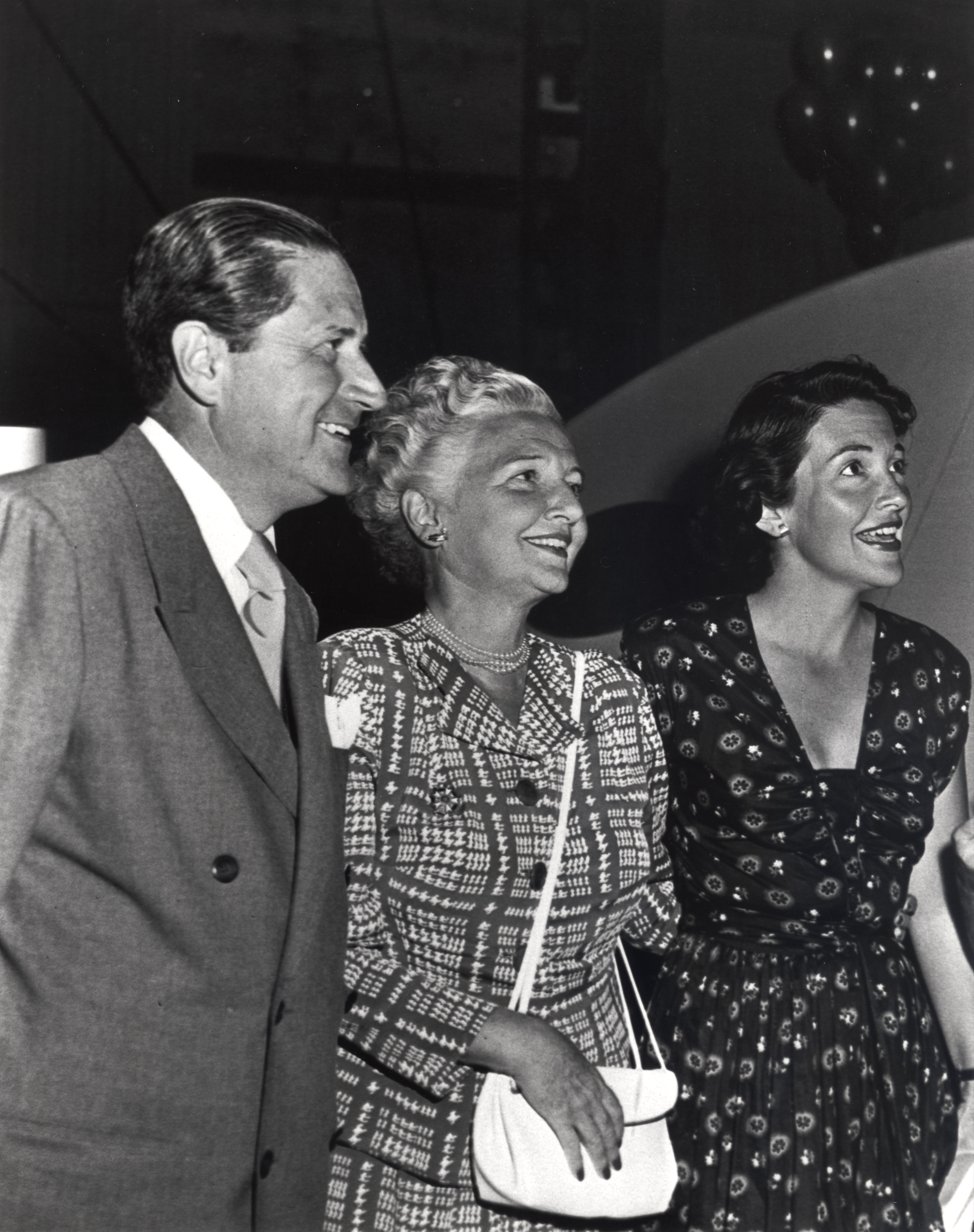
Loyal and Edith Davis with their daughter, Nancy, in 1951

Upon her husband's retirement as Chief of Surgery in 1963, the couple moved to Phoenix, Arizona, where she volunteered time to healthcare organizations, including the United Cerebral Palsy Crusade. She also sat on the board of the American Cancer Society. In 1983, she was awarded the Arizona Lifetime Achievement Award, in recognition of her service to the mentally impaired. The award was later renamed the Edith Davis Award.

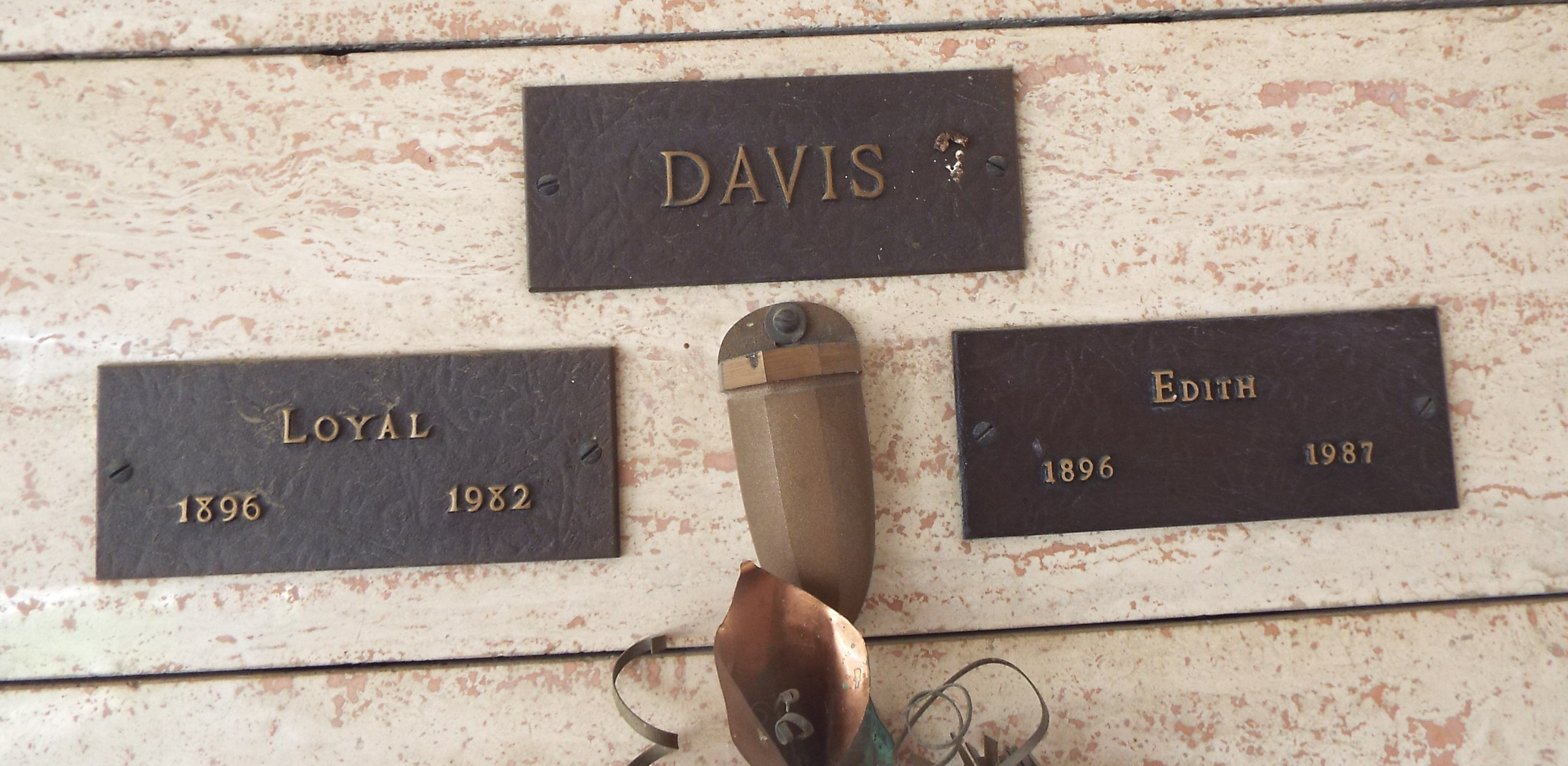
The crypt of Loyal and Edith Davis

Loyal Davis died in 1982 of congestive heart failure, after 53 years of marriage. Upon his death, Edith moved from her home to a smaller apartment in Phoenix. She died on October 26, 1987, aged 91, from a stroke, while her 66-year-old daughter was recovering from breast cancer surgery earlier in the month. Her funeral was held in Phoenix, attended by her daughter, Nancy, the First Lady of the United States; son-in-law Ronald Reagan, the President of the United States; and her stepson, Richard Davis among others. The crypt of Edith and Loyal Davis is located in the marble mausoleum in Greenwood/Memory Lawn Mortuary & Cemetery in Phoenix.

== Filmography ==
- The Little Jewess (1914) as Rebecca (a Kinetophote Corporation film)
- The Coming Power (1914) as Ruth Ellis
- The Spirit of the Poppy (1914) as Helene Ford
- The Other Girl as Estelle Kittredge (1915 or 1916)
