= Judy and Jane =

Judy and Jane was a radio soap opera originally heard on CBS from February 8 to June 17, 1932 and on NBC from October 10, 1932 to April 26, 1935. Sponsored by Folgers Coffee, it was heard regionally in the U.S. Midwest only.

One of the first soap operas on radio, Judy and Jane was extremely popular in the Central Time Zone. Even after the network run ended in 1935, it continued to be distributed through transcription until 1947.

The series was written by Robert Hardy Andrews and produced by Frank and Anne Hummert. The show was about two friends who worked in a department store. Jane was described as being a "mysterious Southern girl", who could sing and play the piano. Jane was said to be a humorous character who used Southern slang.

== Cast ==
- Judy – Margie Calvert, Joan Kay
- Jane – Donna Reade, Betty Ruth Smith, Ireene Wicker and Margaret Evans
- Announcer – Jack Brinkley
