= Virginia Payne =

American actress

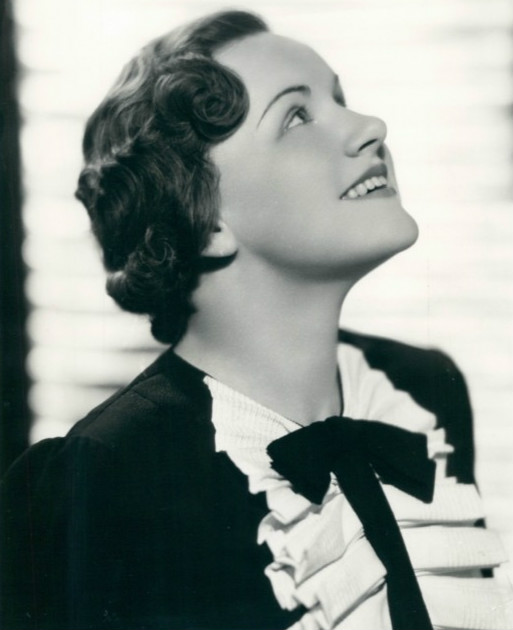
- Virginia Payne, 1934.
- Born: June 19, 1908; Cincinnati, Ohio, U.S.
- Died: February 9, 1977 (aged 68); Cincinnati, Ohio, U.S.
- Occupation: Actress
- Known for: Playing Ma Perkins on radio

Marie Virginia Payne (June 19, 1908 - February 9, 1977 in Cincinnati, Ohio) was an American radio actress, best known for her 27-year role as the title character in the radio soap opera Ma Perkins. In 1939–1940, she played Mrs. Kerry Carter on the radio soap opera The Carters of Elm Street. She was in the soap opera Light of the World, 1940–1950, on CBS and NBC and on Lonely Women on NBC in 1942.

Noting the 25th anniversary of Ma Perkins, Time described Payne in 1957:

Like other daytime heroines, Ma neither drinks, smokes, takes snuff or has affairs with men. Unlike Ma, Cincinnati-born Virginia Payne, 47, has never been married, downs an occasional whisky sour and makes up to $50,000 a year—more than any other actress in daytime broadcasting. Her present writer (she has had ten) lived on the Riviera for two years, now counts his money on Cape Cod. A devout Roman Catholic with an M.A. in literature (University of Cincinnati), Virginia sheds Ma's vocabulary of "ain'ts," "folks" and "Land o' Goshens" with ease, but insists on making personal appearances in wig, makeup, frumpy clothes and spectacles, "though I often feel like a great imposter." She is an accomplished pianist, lives alone in a posh East Side Manhattan apartment decorated with Duveen-collected oil paintings, accumulates antiques, and grows roses (two varieties have been named for her).

== Stage ==
While she attended the University of Cincinnati, she performed in student productions and was the vice president of the club. After the long run of Ma Perkins came to an end, Payne did theater. She appeared on Broadway in the Betty Comden - Adolph Green musical comedy, Fade Out – Fade In (1964–65), and Paul Zindel's play, And Miss Reardon Drinks a Little (1971). Until one month before her death from cancer, she played Mrs. Bedwin in a production of Oliver! staged at the Playhouse in the Park in her home town of Cincinnati.

== Union ==
Payne was active in the American Federation of Radio Artists, serving as president of the Chicago local and as national president.

== Personal life ==
Payne was a graduate of the Schuster-Martin School of Drama in Cincinnati and earned a master's degree from the University of Cincinnati.

== Death ==
Payne died February 9, 1977, at her home in Cincinnati.
