= Kolynos =

American oral care products (1908–1995)

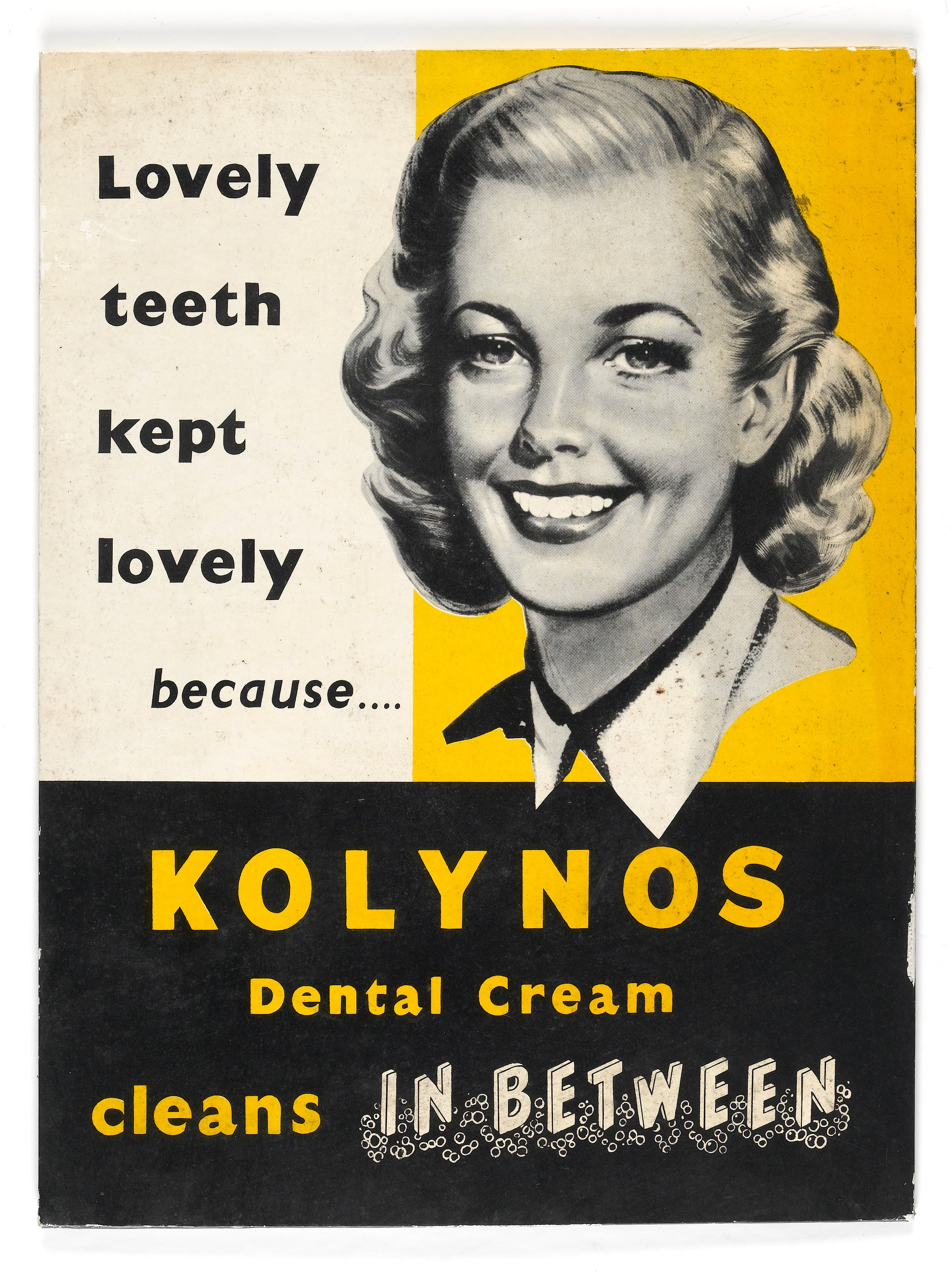
Promotional poster for the Kolynos toothpaste from the 1940s

Kolynos is a line of oral care products created by Newell Sill Jenkins in 1908 and acquired by Colgate-Palmolive in 1995 from Wyeth-Whitehall, who owned the brand since its incarnation. The name is a combination of two Greek words, κωλύω and νόσος, meaning "I am stopping" and "disease" respectively.

The products were popular in the 1930s and 40s, and sponsored several well-known radio programs, including Mr. Keen, Tracer of Lost Persons.

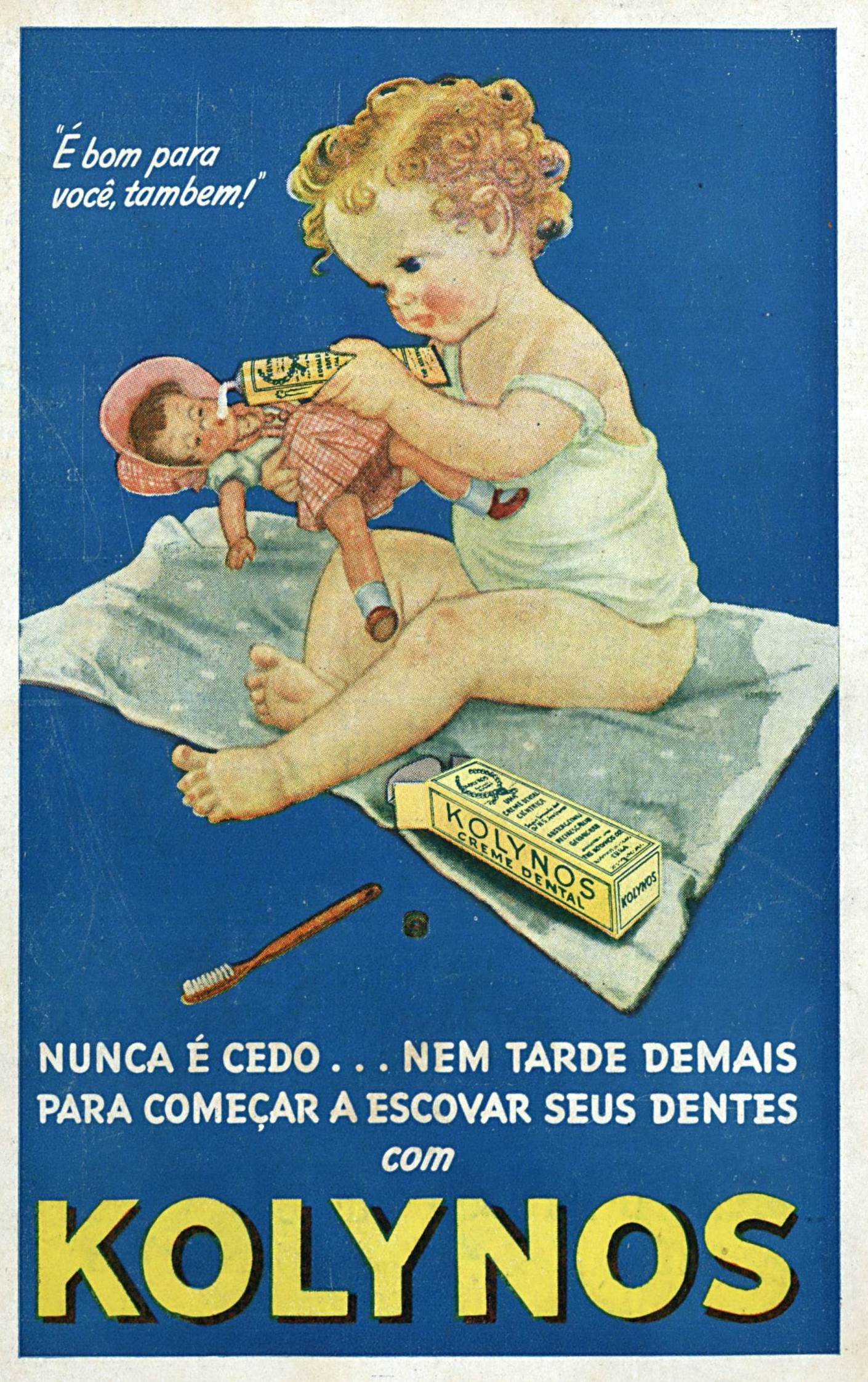
Brazilian advert, 1942

Although not now readily available in the US, the brand remains strong in Latin America, and also manufactured in Hungary, Slovenia (Henkel).

In Brazil, Kolynos was the second best selling brand of toothpaste after Colgate itself, having been sold in the Brazilian market since the 1920s. After Colgate acquired the Kolynos brand globally from Wyeth, under anti-trust legislation Colgate-Palmolive was offered three options the Brazilian agency Administrative Council for Economic Defense and chose to suspend marketing Kolynos-branded toothpaste in Brazil for 4 years from September 1997 to 2001. During the suspension of marketing, Colgate-Palmolive began selling what was essentially the same product with similar packaging and marketing under a new brand called Sorriso ("Smile" in Portuguese, with the same number of letters as Kolynos, and the same o-i-o vowel combination), successfully transferring most of the customer loyalty to the new line of toothpaste.

Kolynos jingles have been written in several languages. In Peru, Kolynos is synonymous with toothpaste and a big smile can be called a Kolynos smile.

== In popular culture ==
The Kolynos brand is mentioned in a passage in The Catcher in the Rye (1951) by J. D. Salinger:

Everybody was asleep or out or home for the week end, and it was very, very quiet and depressing in the corridor. There was this empty box of Kolynos toothpaste outside Leahy and Hoffman's door, and while I walked down towards the stairs, I kept giving it a boot with this sheep-lined slipper I had on.

In the novel Midnight's Children by Salman Rushdie there is a chapter titled "The Kolynos Kid".

The brand is also mentioned in The Black Gang by Herman Cyril McNeile:

By the way, my boy, you skimped your teeth pretty badly to-night. You'll have to do better to-morrow. Most of your molars must be sitting up and begging for Kolynos if that's your normal effort.

It also finds a mention in Vikram Seth's celebrated novel A Suitable Boy:

"Then why don't you go there and ask him about himself', said Malati, who believed in the Approach Audacious. "Whether he brushes his teeth with Kolynos, for instance. "There's magic in a Kolynos smile"

The family dog in the novel The Provincial Lady Goes Further is named after the brand.

== See also ==
- List of toothpaste brands
- Index of oral health and dental articles
- List of defunct consumer brands
