= Orin Tovrov =

American screenwriter

- Born: April 30, 1911
- Died: August 16, 1980 (aged 69); Orleans, Massachusetts, U.S.
- Occupation: Screenwriter

Orin Tovrov (April 30, 1911 - August 16, 1980) was an American screenwriter. He is notable as the creator of the long-running soap opera television series The Doctors. He also wrote the Ma Perkins radio soap opera for 27 years, interrupted only by Navy service in World War II, and he created and wrote the radio show The Brighter Day, which ran briefly in the late 1940s. He was an active citizen of his adopted home town of Orleans on Cape Cod, serving on the School Committee, being active in rebuilding the town's library after a devastating fire, and founding The Orleans Conservation Trust. Tovrov has two children; the late John Tovrov (May 20, 1948 - March 3, 2022) and Jessica Tovrov. Tovrov died in August 1980 in Orleans, Massachusetts, at the age of 69.
