= The Romance of Helen Trent =

Julie Stevens in a posed CBS promotional photo for The Romance of Helen Trent. Radio publicity stills such as these were never as common as photos of actors at microphones. They were usually shot at an exterior location with a minimum of props and costumes in a spontaneous, near-improvised attempt to recreate the audio characters.

The Romance of Helen Trent was a radio soap opera which aired on CBS from October 30, 1933 to June 24, 1960 for a total of 7,222 episodes. The show was created by Frank and Anne Hummert, who were among the most prolific producers during the radio soap era.

The program opened with:

And now, The Romance of Helen Trent, the real-life drama of Helen Trent, who, when life mocks her, breaks her hopes, dashes her against the rocks of despair, fights back bravely, successfully, to prove what so many women long to prove, that because a woman is 35 or more, romance in life need not be over, that romance can begin at 35.

== Characters and story ==
The storyline revolved around a 35-year-old dressmaker who fascinates men as she works her way up to become the chief Hollywood costumer designer. Helen was briefly played by Jeanne Cagney, but was otherwise played by actresses Virginia Clark, Betty Ruth Smith or Julie Stevens. Virginia Clark played the role for 11 years, and Julie Stevens portrayed Helen for 16 years.

Stevens, who had recently finished playing the title role on the radio soap Kitty Foyle, was only 22 when she joined the cast. She continued in the role from 1944 to the show's cancellation in 1960. Stevens was married to a US Steel executive Charles Underhill, and while portraying Helen Trent during 1951–52, she made her television debut as the female lead of Lorelei Kilbourne on the Big Town television series.

Stevens said she saw Helen as being similar to Edith Head. Stevens felt her character was boring and remembered the director allowed the actors to "fall around and scream with laughter during rehearsals. We had to keep our sanity. By air time we had gotten it all out of our systems and could be dead serious about the story."

During the 7,222 episodes (more than any other radio soap), Helen never married, and she always remained at the age of 35. However, she had a long-running beau, Gil Whitney.

An unusual incident occurred during a 1948 broadcast, as documented in Tune in Tomorrow (1968), the memoir by Mary Jane Higby, who portrayed Cynthia Carter on the program. As Gil attempted to convince Helen of his love for her, Helen again demurred and hesitated. Suddenly, a voice came over the airwaves, saying, "Ah, for chrissakes, lay the dame and get it over with!" As crew members tried to locate the voice inside the studio, the man proceeded to give sexually graphic examples of what Gil should do with Helen. In spite of the shock, there were few protests from listeners.

During one of the opening scenes of the 1956 film The Catered Affair, which filmed in the fall of 1955, an episode of the show is playing on the radio as Tom Hurley arrives home from his night job as a taxi driver.

== See also ==
- List of radio soaps

== Listen to ==
- American Studies at the University of Virginia: The Romance of Helen Trent
- John R. Hickman Collection: The Romance of Helen Trent
