= Front Page Farrell =

1940s-50s US radio program

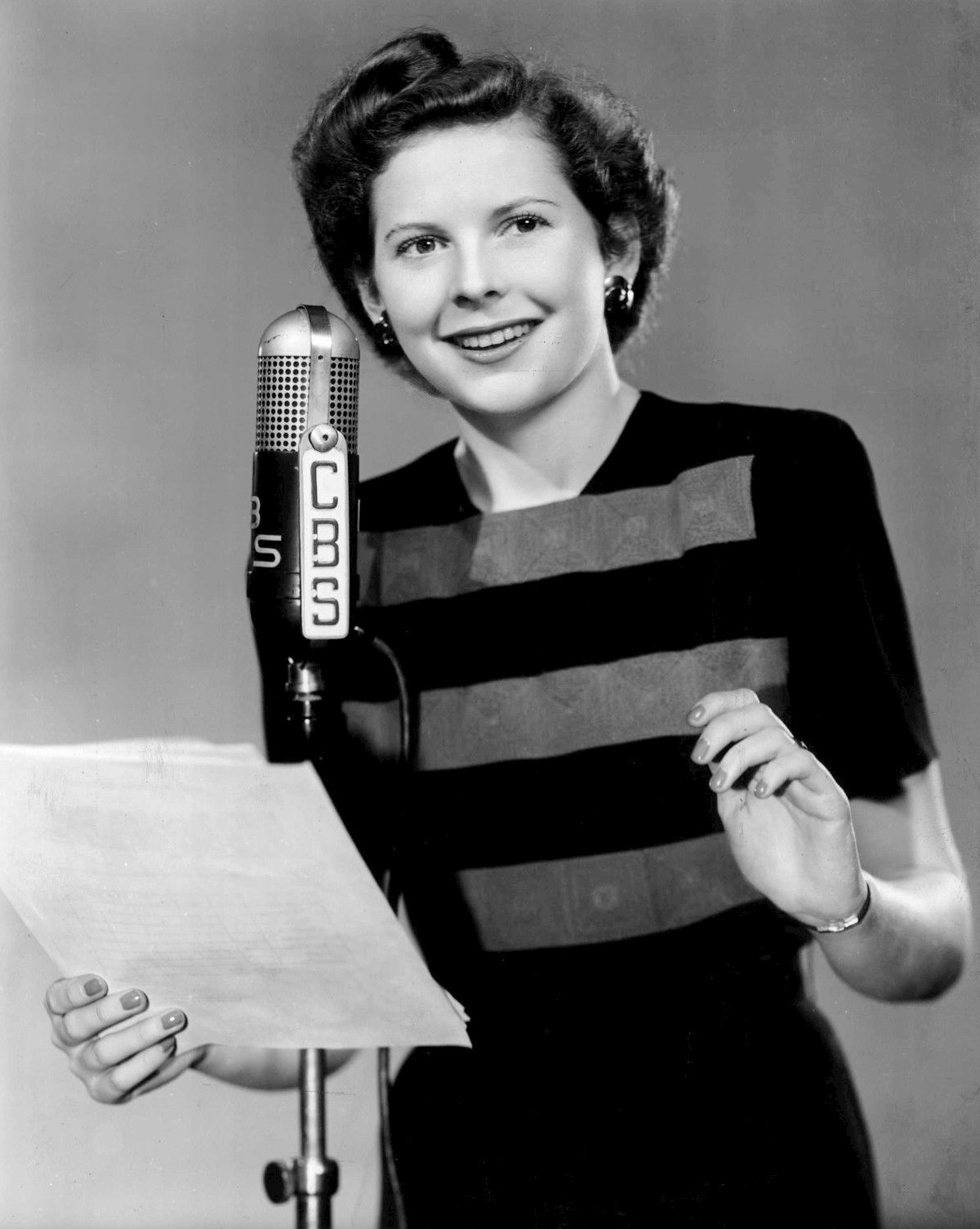
- Virginia Dwyer portrayed Sally Farrell in Front Page Farrell.
- Running time: 15 minutes
- Country of origin: United States
- Language: English
- Home station: WOR
- Syndicates: Mutual; NBC
- Starring: Richard Widmark; Carleton G. Young; Staats Cotsworth; Virginia Dwyer; Florence Williams
- Announcer: Bill Bond; Larry Elliott; Ed Fleming; Don Hancock
- Written by: Alvin Boretz; Harold Gast; Box Saxon; Robert J. Shaw
- Directed by: John Buckwalter; Arthur Hanna; Frank Hummert; Richard Leonard; Ed Slattery; Bill Sweets; Blair Walliser
- Original release: June 23, 1941 – March 26, 1954
- Opening theme: "You and I Know"
- Sponsored by: American Home Products

Front Page Farrell is an American old-time radio program that was broadcast on Mutual from June 23, 1941, to March 13, 1942, and on NBC from September 14, 1942, to March 26, 1954. The episodes broadcast on Mutual originated at WOR, making the program the first live serial that Mutual broadcast from New York City.

== Format ==
In its early years, Front Page Farrell was much like other soap operas in that it focused on the domestic situations of a married couple, David and Sally Farrell. David Farrell was a newspaper reporter, and in the 1950s, the program's focus shifted more to his work, such as "hard-hitting tales of murder investigations as Farrell tracked cold-blooded killers." Each of Farrell's investigations of crimes usually began on Monday and concluded on Friday, which aided infrequent listeners.

== Episodes ==
Typical examples of Front Page Farrell cases (each solved within one week) included:

- "The Deep-Freezer Murder Case", in which a department store executive's body was found in a refrigeration unit.
- "The Fountain of Youth Murder Case", in which a former beauty queen was killed during a rejuvenation treatment.
- "The Blinding Light Murder Case", in which the owner of a modeling agency was murdered.
- "The Interrupted Wedding Murder Case", in which the father of the bride was murdered and a valuable wedding gift disappeared.

== Personnel ==
David Farrell was played by Richard Widmark, Carleton G. Young, and Staats Cotsworth. Sally Farrell was portrayed by Virginia Dwyer and Florence Williams. Actors heard in supporting roles included Peter Capell, Frank Chase, Robert Donley, Katherine Emmet, Elspeth Eric, Betty Garde, Ethel Intropide, Sylvia Leigh, Athena Lorde, James Monks, William Shelley, Eleanor Sherman, Vivian Smolen, George Sturgeon, James Van Dyk, Evelyn Varden, and Sammy Warner, as well as Helen Shields, Charme Allen, Sydney Smith, Cathleen Cordell, and Florence Robinson. Bill Bond, Larry Elliott, Ed Fleming, and Don Hancock were announcers.

Front Page Farrell was created and produced by the husband-and-wife team of Frank and Anne Hummert. The theme was "You and I Know".

Directors included John Buckwalter, Arthur Hanna, Frank Hummert, Richard Leonard, Ed Slattery, Bill Sweets, and Blair Walliser. Writers were Alvin Boretz, Harold Gast, Box Saxon, and Robert J. Shaw.

== Sponsor ==
The American Home Products company sponsored Front Page Farrell, promoting a variety of its products by rotating commercials. The products included Kolynos toothpaste and tooth powder, Anacin pain reliever, Kriptin antihistamine, Freezone corn remover, Heet liniment, Dristan and Primatene cold remedies, Preparation H hemorrhoid treatment, Neet hair remover, Infrarub balm, Black Flag insect repellent, Aerowax floor wax, Wizard room deodorizer, Sani-Flush toilet cleaner, and Easy-Off oven cleaner.
