= John's Other Wife =

American old-time radio soap opera

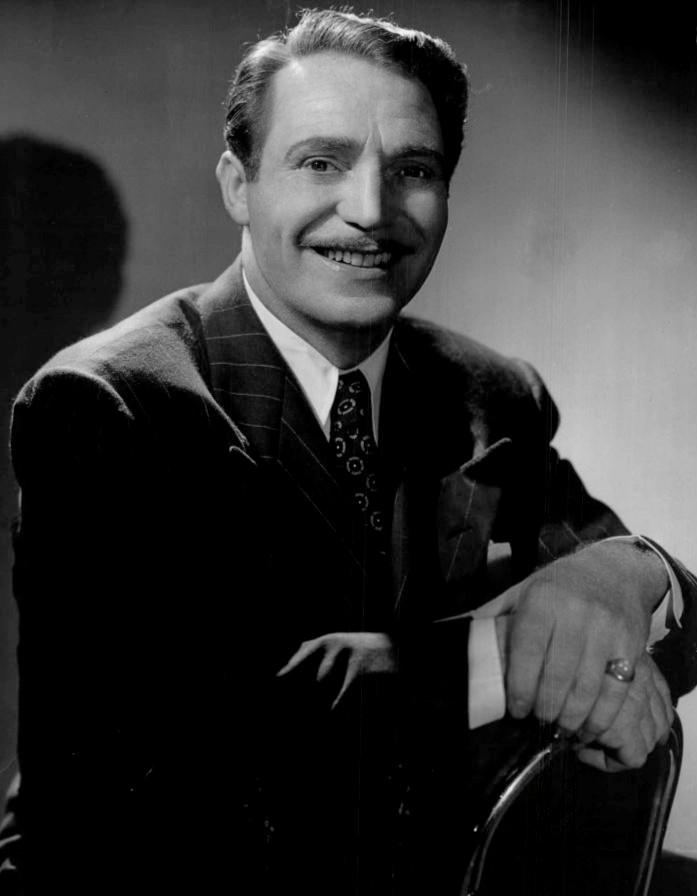
- Hanley Stafford starred as John Perry in John's Other Wife.
- Genre: Soap opera
- Running time: 15 minutes
- Country of origin: United States
- Language(s): English
- Syndicates: NBC-Red; NBC-Blue
- Starring: Hanley Stafford; Matt Crowley; Luis Van Rooten; Richard Kollmar; William Post, Jr. Joseph Curtin; Adele Ronson; Rtin O'Brien-Moore
- Created by: Frank and Anne Hummert
- Produced by: Frank and Anne Hummert
- Original release: September 14, 1936 – March 20, 1942
- Opening theme: "The Sweetest Story Ever Told"
- Sponsored by: Bi-So-Dol; Old English floor wax Louis Phillipe lipstick Freezone

John's Other Wife is an American old-time radio soap opera. It was broadcast on NBC-Red from September 14, 1936, until March 1940. In that month it moved to NBC-Blue, where it ran until March 20, 1942.

== Overview ==
John's Other Wife centered around a store executive, his wife, and a woman who worked for him. The man in the title was John Perry, who owned Perry's Department Store. His insecure wife, Elizabeth, suspected John of being romantically involved with either Annette Rogers, his secretary, or Martha Curtis, his assistant.

The program was one of many soap operas created and produced by Frank Hummert and his wife, Anne.

Sponsors included Bi-So-Dol, Old English floor wax, Louis Phillipe lipstick and Freezone. The theme was "The Sweetest Story Ever Told", by Stanley Davis.

Beginning on May 8, 1939, John's Other Wife was broadcast via electrical transcription on WMCA in New York City in addition to its regular network airings. It was one of eight Blackett-Sample-Hummert programs to do so as a means of increasing New York City coverage for BSH clients.

== Cast ==
The program's cast included the actors shown in the table below:

| Character | Actor |
|---|---|
| John Perry | Hanley Stafford; Matt Crowley; Luis Van Rooten; Richard Kollmar; William Post Jr. Joseph Curtin |
| Elizabeth Perry | Adele Ronson; Erin O'Brien-Moore |
| Martha Curtis | Phyllis Welch; Rita Johnson |
| Roberta Lansing | Joan Banks |
| Annette | Franc Hale |
| Lanny | John Kane |
| Carolyn Prince | Elaine Kent; Patricia Holbrook |
| Grandmother | Mary Cecil; Nell Harrison; Virginia Ogden |
| Dr. Tony Chalmers | Alan Bunce |
| Evelyn | Ethel Blume |
| Molly | Irene Hubbard; Lyda Kane |
| Curt Lansing | Alexander Kirkland |
| Judy | Alice Reinheart |

Source: Radio Programs, 1924-1984: A Catalog of More Than 1800 Shows
