= Mr. Chameleon =

CBS radio drama series

Mr. Chameleon is a detective fiction radio drama created by Frank Hummert and produced by Frank and Anne Hummert. It ran on CBS Radio from July 14, 1948, to 1951 or 1953. The series starred Karl Swenson as a New York police detective who is a master of disguise, and who assumes a new identity in each episode in order to catch a criminal. The listening audience is always aware of who Mr. Chameleon is, no matter in which disguise he appears. According to the series' opening voice-over, "Chameleon" is not a nickname or pseudonym but the character's actual surname, one which he has tried to live up to since childhood. His motto is, "The innocent must be protected and the guilty must be punished." The theme song is John Jacob Loeb and Paul Francis Webster's "Masquerade".

In addition to Swenson, Frank Butler was heard in the role of Dave Arnold (a sergeant who was Mr. Chameleon's assistant), and Richard Keith portrayed the police commissioner. The announcers were George Bryan, Howard Claney, and Roger Knapp. The program was directed by Richard Leonard and written by Marie Baumer. Victor Arden's orchestra provided music.

Broadcast initially on Wednesdays at 8 p.m. Eastern Time, Mr. Chameleon replaced The American Melody Hour. Sponsors of the program included Sterling Drug and Bayer aspirin.

== Critical response ==
A review of the premiere episode in the trade publication Variety said that the cast "turns in graphic characterizations" and rated the quality of production as "Grade A throughout". The review said that the show had the ingredients to make it successful.

A review in the trade publication Billboard during the fourth year of Mr. Chameleon described it as "actually nothing but a night time soap opera in the camouflage of a weekly mystery series." It said that in the specific episode being reviewed, "Script, performance and production were all ridiculously melodramatic and devoid of any real character or animation." The reviewer also wrote that the title character used too many cliches, had too much self confidence, and was a "stuffy individual".
