= Ma Perkins =

American radio soap opera (1933–1960)

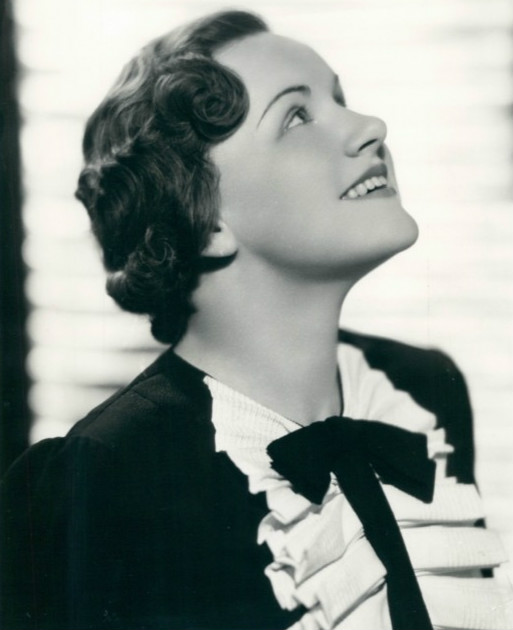
- Virginia Payne as Ma Perkins, 1934.
- Other names: Oxydol's Own Ma Perkins
- Genre: Daytime daily serial
- Running time: 15 minutes
- Country of origin: United States
- Language: English
- Home station: WLW-AM
- Syndicates: NBC; CBS
- Starring: Virginia Payne; Charles Egelston
- Created by: Frank and Anne Hummert
- Written by: Robert Hardy Andrews; Orin Tovrov; Richard Durham
- Produced by: Frank and Anne Hummert
- Original release: August 14, 1933 – November 25, 1960
- No. of episodes: 7,065
- Sponsored by: Oxydol

Ma Perkins (sometimes called Oxydol's Own Ma Perkins) is an American radio soap opera that was heard on NBC from 1933 to 1949 and on CBS from 1942 to 1960. It was also broadcast in Canada, and Radio Luxembourg carried it in Europe.

The program began on WLW in Cincinnati, Ohio, where it was broadcast from August 14, 1933 to December 1, 1933. Its network debut occurred on NBC on December 4, 1933. Between 1942 and 1949, the show was heard simultaneously on both networks. During part of its run on NBC, that network's coverage was augmented by use of transcriptions. Beginning April 1, 1935, nine stations broadcast the transcriptions. Oxydol dropped its sponsorship in 1956. The program continued with various sponsors until 1960.

The series was produced by Frank and Anne Hummert with scripts by Robert Hardy Andrews, Orin Tovrov, and others. (An early scriptwriter was Chicago-based Richard Durham, who was likely the only African-American writing for the radio industry.) Ma Perkins began August 14, 1933, on WLW in Cincinnati. On December 4 of that year, it graduated to the NBC Red network. On NBC and CBS the series ran for a total of 7,065 episodes.

"America’s mother of the air" was portrayed by actress Virginia Payne, who began the role at the age of 19 and never missed a performance during the program's 27-year run. A widow, Ma Perkins had a big heart and a love of humanity. She always offered her philosophy to troubled souls in need of advice.

Ma Perkins is widely credited with giving birth to storytelling and content-based advertising.

== Characters and story ==
Ma owned and operated a lumber yard in the town of Rushville Center (population 4000), where the plotlines pivoted around her interactions with the local townsfolk and the ongoing dilemmas of her three children, Evey, Fay and John. John Perkins died during World War II. Ma's daughter Fay was played by Marjorie Hannan, Isabelle Krehbiel and Rita Ascot. Gilbert Faust had the role of John. Evey Perkins was played by Lillian White, Dora Johnson, Laurette Fillbrandt and Kay Campbell, who later became known for playing Grandma Kate Martin on the television soap opera All My Children. Shuffle Shober, Ma's best friend, was played by Charles Egelston (and later Edwin Wolfe). Murray Forbes was heard as Willie Fitz, and Cecil Roy portrayed Junior Fitz.

In "Sounds from the Past," Chris Plunkett offered an overview of the series:

Typical of Hummert productions, Ma Perkins had her share of tears, crises, and drama, but with a plotline much slower paced than the average soap opera. In a typical year, no more than three or four major complications were covered --interspersed by long "quiet spells," filled with (brutally) protracted discussions on the meaning of life amid the ever-changing tapestry of family, friends and the small town around them... Early in the drama’s run Ma was portrayed as quite combative and spiteful, but her character soon developed (and softened) into the kindhearted sage and conscience of the entire community. There were various dramas that unfolded over the years, some more far-fetched than others. Two of the more memorable plot stretches involve Ma exposing a black market baby-napping ring, and Ma harboring Soviet political dissidents inside her home.

When the show ended on Friday, November 25, 1960, the day after Thanksgiving Day, it was one of only eight entertainment shows still on the CBS radio network. The last episode was the only one in which Virginia Payne's name was mentioned, by Payne herself in a farewell speech. In all other episodes, the announcer at the close of the show would run down the names of all the actors in the cast (but one), and then say, "... and Ma Perkins."

== Cast ==
- Virginia Payne – Ma Perkins
- Murray Forbes - Willie Fitz
- Charles Egelston – Shuffle Shober, Ma's best friend (1933–1958)
- Edwin Wolfe – Shuffle Shober (1958–1960)
- Dora Johnson – Evey Perkins (1933–1944)
- Laurette Fillbrandt – Evey Perkins (1944–1945)
- Kay Campbell – Evey Perkins (1945–1960)
- Isabelle Krehbiel – Fay Perkins (1933)
- Rita Ascot – Fay Perkins
- Margaret Draper – Fay Perkins
- Gilbert Faust – John Perkins
- Helen Lewis - Gladys Perkins
- Marilou Neumayer - Stella Carlton

== See also ==
- List of radio soap operas
- List of longest-serving soap opera actors

== Listen to ==
- Ma Perkins radio shows from 1950 (52 episodes)
- Dick Bertel interview with Virginia Payne on Hartford's WTIC (January, 1973)
