= Mr. Keen, Tracer of Lost Persons =

American radio series (1937 to 1955)

Mr. Keen, Tracer of Lost Persons was an American radio drama which aired October 12, 1937 to April 19, 1955, continuing well into the television era. It was produced by Frank and Anne Hummert, who based it upon Robert W. Chambers' 1906 novel The Tracer of Lost Persons. The sponsors included Whitehall Pharmacal (as in Anacin, Kolynos Toothpaste, BiSoDol antacid mints, Hill's cold tablets and Heet liniment), Dentyne, Aerowax, RCA Victor and Chesterfield cigarettes. It aired on the NBC Blue network until 1947, when it switched to CBS, and was one of the longest-running American shows of the old time radio era.

== Characters and story ==
Bennett Kilpack starred as Mr. Keen for the bulk of the program's run, originating the part in 1937, and leaving the show in 1950. Arthur Hughes and then Phil Clarke stepped into the role late in the series' run. The kindly Keen and his faithful assistant, Mike Clancy (Jim Kelly), entertained listeners for 18 years. With 1,690 nationwide broadcasts, Mr. Keen was the most resilient private detective in a namesake role. The nearest competitors were Nick Carter, Master Detective (726 broadcasts), The Adventures of Sherlock Holmes (657) and The Adventures of the Falcon (473). Only 59 of the 1,690 Mr. Keen programs are known to survive.

Richard Leonard directed scripts by Barbara Bates, Stedman Coles, Frank Hummert, Lawrence Klee and Bob Shaw. James Fleming and Larry Elliott were the announcers. Al Rickey's band provided the background music, including the program's theme, "Someday I'll Find You", written by Noël Coward.

== Satires ==
The cliches, stereotypes and simplistic dialogue of Mr. Keene provided much fodder for Bob and Ray's parody, Mr. Trace, Keener Than Most Persons, broadcast in numerous variations. It was also combined with rival detective show Martin Kane, Private Eye and satirized by Harvey Kurtzman and Jack Davis in Mad magazine's fifth issue (June–July 1953), as Kane Keen! Private Eye.

The character of Mr. Keen was referenced by Alfred Hitchcock in one of his television shows, according to The Alfred Hitchcock Presents Companion by Patrik Wikstrom and Martin Grams, Jr. Mr. Keen is also mentioned in the stage version of Bye Bye Birdie by the character Mr. Harry MacAfee, who was played by Paul Lynde.

In the "Honeymooners" sketch, "Razor Blades", appearing on the October 12, 1951 episode of Cavalcade of Stars, Ralph Kramden cannot find his razor blades. When he questions Alice Kramden about it, she responds, "What am I? Mrs. Keen, Tracer of Lost Razor Blades?".

== Listen to ==
- Archive.org: Mr. Keen, Tracer of Lost Persons (all extant episodes)
