= Frank Hummert =

American advertising agent (1884–1966)

- Born: Edward Frank Hummert, Jr. June 2, 1884; St. Louis, Missouri, U.S.
- Died: March 12, 1966 (aged 81); Manhattan, New York City, U.S.
- Other name: E. Frank Hummert
- Education: Stonyhurst College; Saint Louis University
- Occupations: Advertising agent, producer
- Years active: 1904-1960
- Known for: Creator/producer of Just Plain Bill; The Romance of Helen Trent; Ma Perkins; Backstage Wife
- Spouses: Adeline E. Woodlock (m. 1908; died 1934) Anne Ashenhurst (m. 1935)
- Children: John Ashenhurst, Jr. (stepson)

Edward Frank Hummert, Jr. (June 2, 1884 – March 12, 1966), professionally known as Frank Hummert and sometimes credited as E. Frank Hummert, was an American advertising agent originally but was best known for producing episodes of nearly 100 daytime/primetime radio dramas, soap opera serials, and music programs between the 1930s and the 1950s.

Hummert, along with his wife Anne Hummert, became the monarchs of daytime radio with dramas such as Just Plain Bill (1932–55), The Romance of Helen Trent (1933–60), Ma Perkins (1933–60), and Backstage Wife (1935–59). After the success of these dramas, the Hummerts formed Hummert Radio Productions. Under Hummert Productions, creating the basic plots and assigning an assembly line of writers to complete the scripts, they produced more than 40 radio shows, including the soap operas Stella Dallas (1938–55) and Young Widder Brown (1938–56); the mystery shows Mr. Keen, Tracer of Lost Persons (1937–54), and Mr. Chameleon (1948–51); and musical programs including The American Album of Familiar Music (1931–51) and Manhattan Merry-Go-Round (1933–49). In all, the Hummerts are credited with the creation/production of 61 radio soap operas.

By 1937, with his success on radio and potential advertisers lining up to become clients, Hummert had become advertising's highest paid executive.

== Early life ==
Edward Frank Hummert, Jr. was born to parents Edward F. and Carrie Hummert in St. Louis, Missouri on June 2 in the disputed year of 1884. According to a majority of sources and public records including the Draft Registration Card he completed and signed in September 1918, Edward Frank Hummer was born on June 2, 1884. However, this date has been disputed by some sources including media historians. For example, the Encyclopædia Britannica lists Hummert's birth year as 1879, while media historian Christopher H. Sterling lists Hummert's birth year as 1885. Even radio historian Jim Cox lists two different birth years in two separate books. In The Great Radio Soap Operas, published in 1999, Cox lists Hummert's birth year as 1882. But in Frank and Anne Hummert's Radio Factory, published in 2003, he gives the birth year as 1884.

Hummert's mother came from French ancestry and his father was English. The latter was a mercantilist in lace manufacturing and importing who traveled extensively for Rice, Stix & Co. As a result, Hummert and his family were accustomed to moving around. Hummert, in his early years, lived in various places across the United States and Europe before his father began operating his own merchandising-exporting venture under the label "Hummert Hatfield Co." and the family permanently settled in St. Louis.

Hummert, hoping to take over his father's business, began preparatory studies at the Stonyhurst College in Lancashire, England. By the age of 20, Hummert decided against his father's business and after finishing studies at Stonyhurst, Hummert returned to Missouri and graduated from Saint Louis University.

Hummert turned to public media and soon landed a reporting assignment with the St. Louis Post-Dispatch and after that assignment ended, Hummert landed reporting jobs for the news journal of the Catholic Archdiocese in Chicago, New World and the International News Syndicate of The New York Times. In 1904, he obtained a real-estate license in St. Louis and became wealthy by buying and selling residential and commercial properties in the aftermath of the seven-month Louisiana Purchase Exposition, informally known as the 1904 World's Fair, which attracted nearly 20 million visitors to St. Louis.

== Career ==
=== In advertising ===
In 1920, Hummert began working in his new field of interest, advertising. He was hired as chief copywriter for Albert Lasker's Lord & Thomas agency in New York. Hummert earned a starting salary of $50,000 a year. One of Hummert's first big breaks in advertising came when he coined the slogan "For the skin you love to touch" for soap manufacturer Procter & Gamble's Camay. While at Lord & Thomas, Hummert created ads and slogans for such name-brand companies as Ovaltine, Quaker Quick Macaroni, Gold Medal Flour and Palmolive soap.

In 1927, Hummert left Lord & Thomas and accepted a position with Hill Blackett and J.G. Sample as vice president of their Chicago based agency. In 1943, the agency was renamed the Blackett-Sample-Hummert agency.

=== In radio ===
In 1927, Hummert hired a new assistant, 22-year-old Anne Ashenhurst (née Schumacher). Ashenhurst was nearly 21 years Hummert's junior, but was the only staff member able to maintain the 18-hour workdays for which Hummert was known. By the age of 22, she had graduated from Goucher College in 1925, had traveled to Paris, gotten a job with the International Herald Tribune, (now known as the International New York Times), and had been married to and divorced from newspaper reporter John Ashenhurst with whom she had a son, all in the span of two years.

==== Just Plain Bill and early radio years ====
Frank Hummert and Anne Ashenhurst began collaborating in radio in 1932 and married in 1935. Both were frugal and intensely private, preferring work to a social life. Their earliest radio serial was the soap opera Betty and Bob. Betty and Bob, sponsored by General Mills' Gold Medal Flour, was about the marriage of a secretary of her wealthy boss, whose disapproving father cuts Bob out of the will. The program sustained an eight-year run from 1932-1940.

Also in 1932, their long-running soap Ma Perkins starring Virginia Payne premiered on the radio. Ma Perkins centered around "Ma," who owned and operated a lumber yard in the fictional small Southern town of Rushville Center (population 4000), where the plotlines pivoted around her interactions with the local townsfolk and the ongoing dilemmas of her three children, Evey, Fay and John. The program ended in November 1960.

In September 1932, Just Plain Bill, under the name Bill the Barber, premiered on CBS Radio. The series revolved around a barber who marries above his league. Just Plain Bill and Ma Perkins were the start of the Hummerts' radio empire. Another popular radio serial created by the Hummerts was Skippy, based on the popularity of the eponymous comics series by Percy Crosby.

==== Helen Trent and radio success ====
In their first year in radio, Hummert and Schumacher created Just Plain Bill and Ma Perkins, (which both enjoyed extensive 20-plus year runs on radio), for the daytime radio schedule. Their next major hit was The Romance of Helen Trent which premiered October 30, 1933, on CBS. The program revolved around the personal romantic life of Helen Trent and the continuing question: Can a woman of 35 find love? The program ended after 27 years and 7,222 episodes in June 1960, more than any other radio soap opera.

With the premieres of Mr. Keen, Tracer of Lost Persons, The American Album of Familiar Music, Manhattan Merry-Go-Round and Mary Noble, Backstage Wife between 1931 and 1937, Blackett-Sample-Hummert were producing 46% of shows on the daytime radio schedule.

With the beginning of the 17-year run of Stella Dallas in 1938, the Hummert factory was underway. In 1943, B-S-H reorganized to form Dancer Fitzgerald Sample and the Hummerts spun off their own radio production company, Air Features, Inc., which continued to control the airwaves and purchase air time through DFS.

In addition to their daytime soap operas, the Hummerts produced 17 musical programs and 14 crime/mystery shows. To oversee the musical programs, Frank Hummert turned to Gus Haenschen, the St. Louis bandleader who had performed at Hummert's first wedding and was now nationally known on radio as an arranger, conductor, producer, and co-founder of the World Broadcasting System, which supplied high-quality recordings of vocal and instrumental music to smaller radio stations which could not afford a "live" orchestra. Haenschen was entrusted to assign orchestra leaders, vocalists, choral conductors, arrangers, and announcers to each of the musical programs produced by Air Features, for all of which Frank Hummert selected the sponsors, and in some cases the networks, as he did for the soap operas, mystery shows, and crime dramas. At one point, the Hummerts' output included 18 separate serials on the air and as many as 90 episodes each week. The number of writers the Hummerts retained for the scripting of their shows totaled approximately 50, all of whom became accustomed to the tall, gaunt, stoop-shouldered Frank Hummert or the petite Anne Hummert with her trademark white-frame glasses showing up unannounced and spontaneously examining drafts of their output. Other Hummert programs included Amanda of Honeymoon Hill, Judy and Jane, Little Orphan Annie, Frontpage Farrell, Inspector Thorne, and Hearthstone of the Death Squad.

== Personal life and death ==
Public records show that Hummert married the former Adeline Eleanor Woodlock (1886–1934) on July 27, 1908. Woodlock, called "Eleanor" by family and friends, resided just a few blocks away from Hummert and his family. Hummert was German Catholic and Woodlock was Irish Catholic. Walter Gustave "Gus" Haenschen, a popular St. Louis bandleader whom Hummert had publicized as a newspaper reporter, was the pianist at their wedding.

Adeline Eleanor Hummert died on May 11, 1934. She and Frank Hummert had been married for 26 years at the time of her death. They had no children, and had been living in Chicago for several years before her death. Her gravestone in Chicago's Graceland Cemetery reads "Adeline Woodlock Hummert, 1886-1934, Beloved Wife of E. Frank Hummert."

The following year, Hummert married Anne Ashenhurst, his former assistant at Blackett-Sample-Hummert.

Hummert died on March 12, 1966, in Manhattan. He was 81. Anne Hummert, who never remarried, died a multimillionaire recluse on July 5, 1996, in her Fifth Avenue apartment at the age of 91.
