= Anne Hummert =

American radio soap opera writer

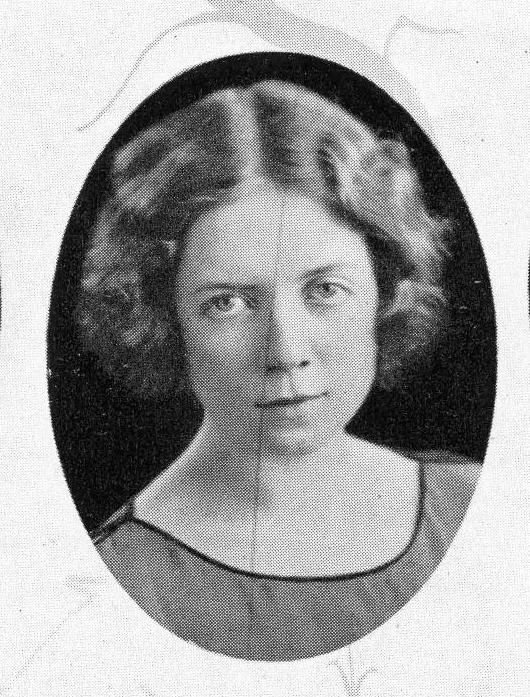
- Born: January 19, 1905
- Died: July 5, 1996 (aged 91)

Anne Hummert (née Schumacher) (January 19, 1905 – July 5, 1996) was the leading co-creator of daytime radio serials or soap opera dramas during the 1930s and 1940s, responsible for more than three dozen series.

== Biography ==
She was born in Baltimore, Maryland, one of four children. Little is known about her parents or her childhood: some sources say her father Frederick was a police lieutenant; census documents say he was a steamfitter and contractor, and still other sources say he was an engineer. After attending Towson High School, she attended Goucher College, where she majored in history, graduating Phi Beta Kappa and magna cum laude in 1925. While at Goucher she also worked as a college correspondent for The Baltimore Sun. She then took a job with the Paris precursor of the International Herald Tribune. It was in France that she married reporter John Ashenhurst, a former member of The Baltimore Sun's editorial staff, in July 1926. The couple had one son, but the marriage was troubled. They moved back to the United States, and ultimately divorced. Anne Ashenhurst moved to Chicago, where she sought work as a journalist, but was unable to find a job. She was told of an opening at an advertising agency, and in 1930, she was hired as a copywriter and assistant to advertising executive E. Frank Hummert. At the Blackett-Sample-Hummert agency, she rose in the ranks and became a full partner in 1933, earning $100,000 a year. Radio historian Jim Cox noted that when the two teamed to create daytime radio serials, they:

intended to seize the housewives' attention and alter the pattern of their daily existence ... Radio as Americans experienced it during its golden age likely would have been vastly different had Frank and Anne Hummert not been on the scene to influence it so pervasively.

After their first major success, Just Plain Bill, they followed with Ma Perkins, Skippy, Backstage Wife and Young Widder Brown. Their professional collaboration led to a personal relationship that neither had expected: Frank Hummert was a widower, after the death of his wife, Adeline Eleanor Woodlock, in 1934. He was twenty years older than his assistant, who was still recovering from her divorce from her husband John and was not expecting to remarry. That changed in 1935, when she married Frank Hummert. Friends and radio colleagues would later describe their marriage as "one of the great love matches". Following their marriage, Frank and Anne Hummert moved to New York where they launched their company, Air Features, a radio production house. The Hummerts produced many radio drama series, including Amanda of Honeymoon Hill, Front Page Farrell, John's Other Wife, Little Orphan Annie, Judy and Jane, Mr. Chameleon, Mr. Keen, Tracer of Lost Persons and Our Gal Sunday. They soon had as many as 18 separate 15-minute serials airing for a total of 90 episodes a week. They also produced The American Album of Familiar Music the longest-running of 17 musical programs Air Features produced.

This survey of the life and careers of the Hummerts was published in 2003.

From their estate in Greenwich, Connecticut, Anne Hummert delivered a large weekly word count, outlining all of the plot twists for all of her programs. The Hummerts farmed out the writing to scripters, known as "dialoguers", who embellished her synopses into complete scripts for Stella Dallas, Young Widder Brown and other soap operas.

Actress Mary Jane Higby observed, "Unquestionably, they had a profound influence on the whole literature of soap opera. They, more than anyone else, determined the shape it took." According to Jim Cox, by the 1940s the Hummerts controlled 46% of the national weekday broadcast schedule. Their programs brought in more than five million letters a year. By 1939, the Hummerts' programs were responsible for more than half the advertising revenues generated by daytime radio.

The Hummerts each had an annual income of $100,000 from their Air Features Corporation, but were considerably wealthier due to Frank Hummert's commercial real-estate holdings in his native St. Louis. Both were frugal and intensely private, preferring work to an active social life. Frank Hummert died at 76 in 1966. Anne Hummert was a multimillionaire recluse when she died on July 5, 1996, in her Fifth Avenue apartment at the age of 91.

== See also ==
- List of radio soaps
