= David Harum (disambiguation) =

David Harum is a novel by Edward Noyes Westcott, first published in 1898.

David Harum also refers to several adaptations, including:

- David Harum (1915 film)
- David Harum (1934 film)
- David Harum (radio program)
