= Joy Hathaway =

American actress

- Born: Joy Hathaway Meeker; Canada
- Died: November 4, 1954; Vancouver, British Columbia
- Education: University of British Columbia
- Occupation: Actress
- Spouse: Charles Kenny

Joy Hathaway (born Joy Hathaway Meeker; 1913 (Note: The age 41 would indicate a birth date between November 1912 and November 1913. Factoring in the 1950 U.S. Census, enumerated on May 12, by which time she has reached age 37, and the 1940 Census, enumerated on April 2, at which time she has not yet reached age 27, seems to narrow that down to April or May 1913. However, if—as both her own and her father's obituaries indicate—Hathaway had no sisters, a contemporaneous report published in January 1913 makes it hard not to conclude that she was born that month.) – November 4, 1954) was a Canadian-born American actress on stage, old-time radio, and television.

== Early years ==
One of five children and the only daughter born to Bessie Ann Townsend and Henry Clemons Meeker, Hathaway was from Vancouver, British Columbia. She was educated at Victoria Normal School and graduated from the University of British Columbia, where she acted in productions of the Varsity Players Club.

== Career ==
Hathaway sang in operettas by Gilbert and Sullivan. On Broadway, she portrayed Mrs. Ritter in A Slight Case of Murder (1935), a fitter in The Women (1936), and an usherette in The Fabulous Invalid (1938).

Hathaway's work on radio included the roles shown in the table below.

Program	Character
Amanda of Honeymoon Hill	Amanda Dyke
David Harum	Celia
Our Gal Sunday	Regina Page
Second Husband	Irma Wallace
Stella Dallas	Laurel Dallas

She also had roles on Young Widder Brown, True Story Tales of Tomorrow, Modern Romances, and Seth Parker.

In 1953, Hathaway was the model for a statue of Sister Thérèse Couderc. Sculptor Pietro Montana created the life-size sculpture of the nun, who was being considered for canonization.

== Personal life ==
Hathaway was married to composer Charles Kenny.

== Death ==
On November 5, 1954, Hathaway died at age 41 of pneumonia in a hospital in Vancouver. Her death came three hours after the funeral for her three-week-old daughter, who also died of pneumonia.
