= Ripley Hitchcock =

American editor (1857–1918)

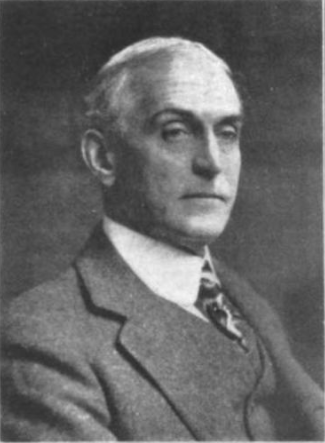
- Born: James Ripley Wellman Hitchcock; July 3, 1857; Fitchburg, Massachusetts
- Died: May 5, 1918 (aged 60); New York, New York
- Occupation(s): Editor, writer
- Spouses: Martha Barker Wolcott (m. 1883; died 1903) Helen Sanborn Sargent (m. 1914)
- Children: 2

Ripley Hitchcock (born James Ripley Wellman Hitchcock; 1857–1918) was a prominent American editor. He edited the works of Rudyard Kipling, Arthur Conan Doyle, Zane Grey, Joel Chandler Harris, Stephen Crane and Theodore Dreiser.

== Biography ==
Ripley Hitchcock was born in Fitchburg, Massachusetts on July 3, 1857. His father was surgeon Alfred Hitchcock (1813-1874). He graduated from Harvard University in 1877. After his graduation, he was a special student at Harvard in fine arts and philosophy. He attended lectures at the New York College of Physicians and Surgeons for one year.

He started work as a journalist for The New York Tribune in 1882. In 1890, he became literary adviser for D. Appleton & Company, in which capacity he edited Edward Noyes Westcott's narrative David Harum (1898) into a bestseller, later made into a film. From 1902 to 1906, he worked for A. S. Barnes as vice president. From 1906 onwards, he worked as an editor for Harper and Brothers. He unfanged Stephen Crane's lewd details and Theodore Dreiser's irony.

He also wrote books on art and the history of the West and was a member of the National Institute of Arts and Letters, the Century Association and the Authors Club.

He married Martha Barker Wolcott on May 23, 1883. She died in 1903, and he remarried to Helen Sanborn Sargent on January 7, 1914. They had two sons.

Ripley Hitchcock died at the Park Avenue Hotel in Manhattan on May 5, 1918.

== Bibliography ==
- The Western Art Movement (New York, 1885)
- A Study of George Jenness, with a catalogue of the Jenness exhibition (1885)
- Etching in America (1886)
- Madonnas by old masters (1888)
- Some American painters in water colors: Fac-similes of new works by William D. Smedley ... [et al.]; with portraits of the artists and representations of their work in black-and-white (1890)
- Thomas De Quincey: A study (1899)
- Louisiana Purchases Explorations Early History Building Of West (1903)
- Richard Henry Stoddard: Some personal notes (1903)
- The Lewis and Clark Expedition (1905)
