= Amanda of Honeymoon Hill =

American radio soap opera series (1940–1946)

- Genre: Daytime serial drama
- Running time: 15 minutes
- Country of origin: United States
- Language: English
- Syndicates: Blue Network, CBS
- Starring: Joy Hathaway; Arlene Francis
- Announcer: Frank Gallop; George Ansbro; Howard Claney; Hugh Conover
- Created by: Frank and Anne Hummert
- Written by: Anne Hummert
- Directed by: Arnold Michaelis
- Original release: February 5, 1940 – April 26, 1946
- Audio format: Mono
- Opening theme: "Jeanie with the Light Brown Hair"
- Sponsored by: Cal-Aspirin; Haley's MO; Phillips Milk of Magnesia; Phillips Toothpaste; Ironized Yeast; Mulsified Cocoanut Oil Shampoo

Amanda of Honeymoon Hill is a 15-minute daily radio soap opera produced by Frank and Anne Hummert. Broadway actress Joy Hathaway had the title role, sometimes described as "the beauty of flaming red hair." The series was broadcast from February 5, 1940, until April 26, 1946, initially on the Blue Network at 3:15 p.m. until August 1942. It then moved to CBS, airing at 10:30 a.m. until 1943 when it was heard at 11 a.m.

== Characters and story ==
The story followed the travails of the beautiful Charity Amanda Dyke Leighton (Joy Hathaway), who lived on Honeymoon Hill in Virginia with her husband, wealthy Southerner Edward Leighton (Boyd Crawford, George Lambert, Staats Cotsworth). As an artist, Edward made many portraits of Amanda. They had a son, Robert Elijah, but they were separated by events prompted by World War II. Edward left for Abbeyville to run his factory, converted for war production, while Amanda remained in Honeymoon Hill to supervise her nursery for the children of war workers.

Dot was portrayed by Linda Watkins, and Helen Shields had the role of Sylvia Meadows. Arlene Francis was a cast member in 1941. Also in the cast: Ruth Russell and John Brown (as Mr. Lenord). Organist Ann Leaf supplied the program's background music, and the opening theme was Stephen Foster's 1854 tune, "Jeanie with the Light Brown Hair." In addition to Frank Gallop and George Ansbro, other announcers were Howard Claney and Hugh Conover.

Anne Hummert unintentionally scripted a prominent double meaning into the show's opening, and this amused many since it was heard for years without change, as described by George Ansbro in his book, I Have a Lady in the Balcony:

Amanda of Honeymoon Hill ran for five years in the early forties. Frank Gallop was the regular announcer, and his occasional tendency to almost break up but still manage to hang on for dear life while on the air was the giggly gossip of New York radio. The reason was the opening announcement which, as on all the Hummert soaps, was written by Anne Hummert. This particular lead-in indicated how truly naive Mrs. Hummert must really have been: "We bring you now the story of Amanda of Honeymoon Hill, laid in a world few Americans know. The story of love and marriage in America's romantic South..." The attention-getting word remained for the entire run of the program because, evidently, none of Anne Hummert's subordinates at Air Features had the temerity to approach her about deleting the double entendre and replacing it with a word or phrase less suggestive. Rather than chance it, they skipped it. But by substituting for Gallop myself once in a while, I found out what it must have been like for poor Frank to not break up. And for five years yet.

== Sponsors ==
The program was sponsored by Cal-Aspirin, Haley's MO, Phillips Milk of Magnesia, Phillips Toothpaste, Ironized Yeast and Mulsified Cocoanut Oil Shampoo.

Cal-Aspirin sponsored several daytime dramas, as advertising historian Danny Goodwin explained:

Cal-Aspirin was either the sponsor or co-sponsor of (at least) three network daytime serial programs. During the 1935-1936 season, it was the sponsor of Painted Dreams on Mutual and co-sponsored NBC (Blue's) Amanda of Honeymoon Hill during its first two seasons (1940-1942) with Haley's M-O. While the two soaps had various successes, Cal-Aspirin achieved fame as being the very first sponsor of Young Widder Brown, which would become one of radio's most popular serials. Its fame was brief, because it sponsored the program for only its initial season before turning the sponsoring duties over to Bayer Aspirin.

== See also ==
- List of radio soaps

== Listen to ==
- Full day coverage on D-Day includes Amanda of Honeymoon Hill
