= Horse trading =

Complex bargaining or exchange

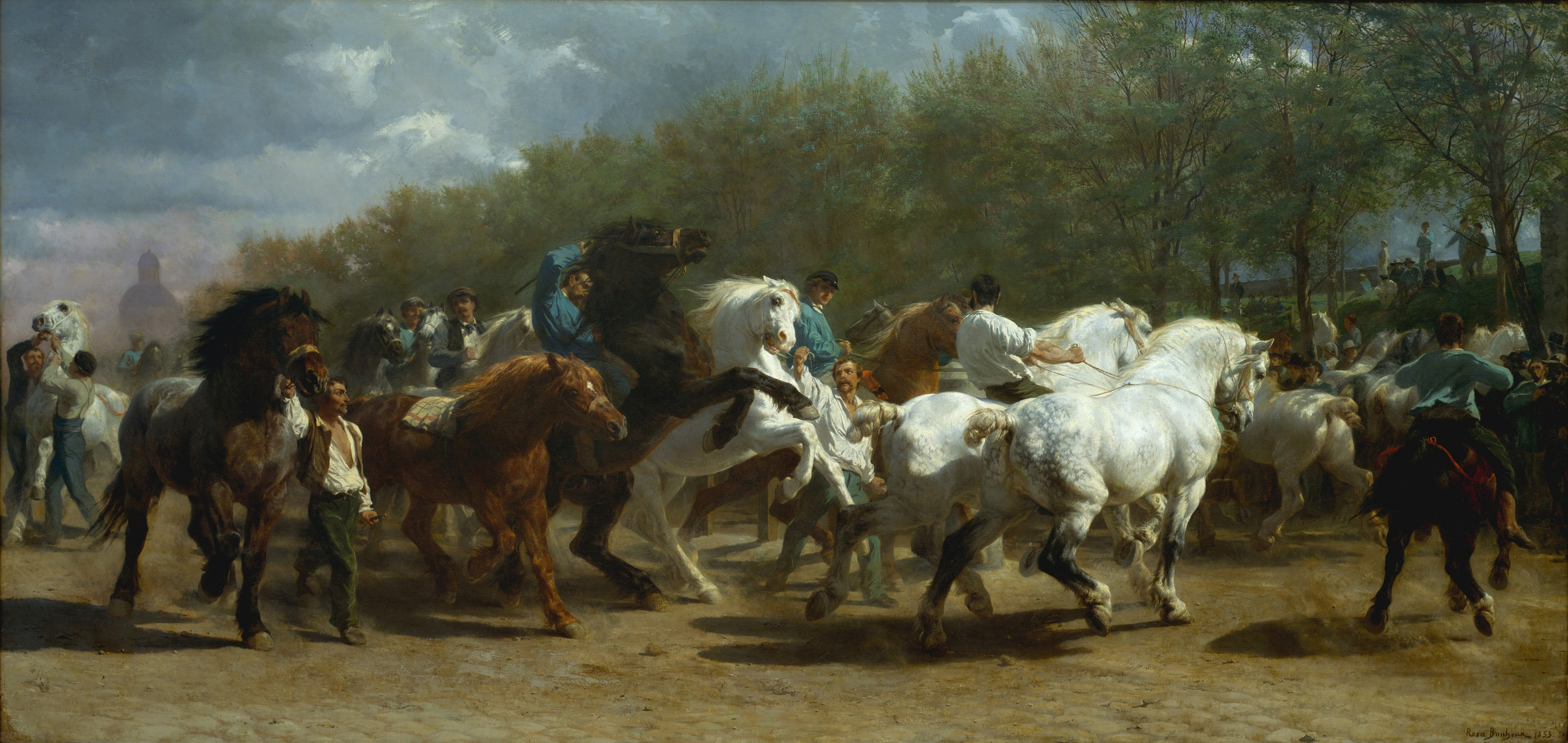
The Horse Fair – a depiction of the Paris horse market in the 1850s

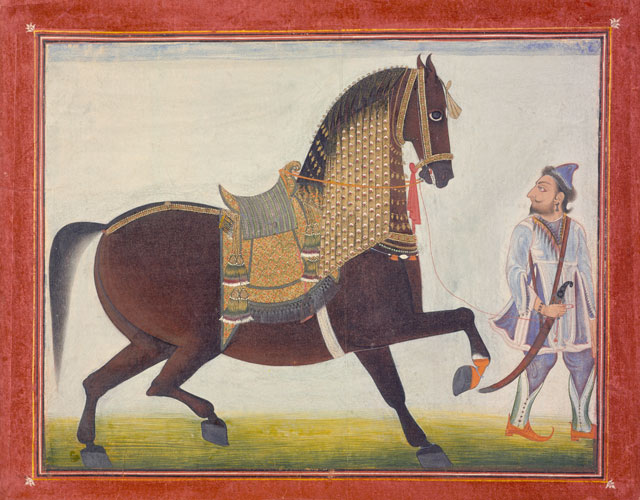
A Horse and His Trader, circa 1800

Horse trading, in its literal sense, is the buying and selling of horses, also called "horse dealing". Due to the difficulties in evaluating the merits of a horse offered for sale, the sale of horses offered great opportunities for dishonesty, leading to use of the term horse trading (or horsetrading) as a widespread metaphor for complex bargaining or other transactions, such as political vote trading. It was expected that horse sellers would capitalize on these opportunities and so those who dealt in horses gained a reputation for underhanded business practices.

== Tea Horse Road ==
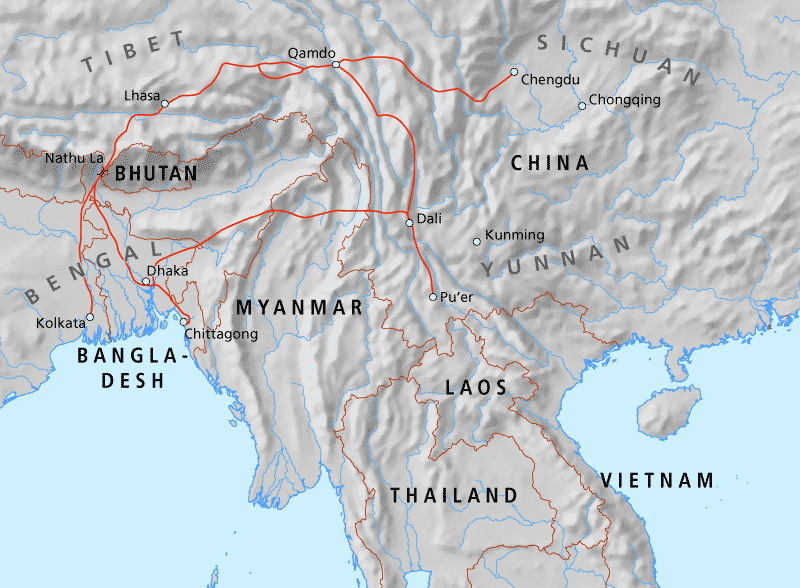
Map of the Tea-Horse route

The Tea Horse Road or Chamadao (simplified Chinese: 茶马道; traditional Chinese: 茶馬道), now generally referred to as the Ancient Tea Horse Road or Chamagudao (simplified Chinese: 茶马古道; traditional Chinese: 茶馬古道) was a network of caravan paths winding through the mountains of Sichuan, Yunnan and Tibet in Southwest China. This was also a tea trade route. There are numerous surviving archaeological and monumental elements, including trails, bridges, way stations, market towns, palaces, staging posts, shrines and temples along the route.

== Origin of the phrase ==
As standards for ethical business declined in the United States in the Gilded Age, the activities of horse traders came increasingly to be seen as the natural and, in part, desirable product of a competitive market rather than as symptoms of moral depravity. In an 1893 New York Times editorial criticizing a proposed law to make it illegal for a newspaper to falsely state its circulation figures, the author declared that "if the lying were stopped by law, the business of horse trading would come to an end, and the country taverns and groceries in the Winter season would be deprived even of the limited eventfulness which they now enjoy".

Reflecting this attitude, the term horse trading was widely adopted as a way to describe what might be seen as unethical business practices in a more positive light. It is likely the 1898 publication of Edward Noyes Westcott's David Harum – whose title character saw all business through the lens of horse trading – played a key role in this.

== As a political term ==
In a further development of meaning, horse trading has come to refer specifically to political vote trading. This is now the most common sense of the term, largely displacing the older term, logrolling.

In some languages political bargaining is known as "cow trading" (German: Kuhhandel, Swedish: Kohandel, Finnish: Lehmänkauppa). In Sweden, the May 1933 agreement between the Swedish Social Democratic Party and the Swedish Farmers' League which came to shape the economic politics of Sweden during the 20th century, known as the Nordic Model, was called "the cow trade".

== See also ==
- Automobile salesperson
