= Down Home =

Down Home may refer to:

- Down Home (film), a 1920 silent film based on a book by Frank N. Westcott starring Leatrice Joy
- Down Home (Zoot Sims album), 1960
- Down Home (Chet Atkins album), 1962
- Down Home (Sam Jones album), 1962
- Down Home (Melba Montgomery album), 1964
- Down Home (The Nashville String Band album), 1970
- Down Home (Seals and Crofts album), 1970
- Down Home (Joey Baron album), 1997
- Down Home Records, a record label founded by Norman Granz
- "Down Home" (Alabama song), a 1991 song by Alabama
- "Down Home" (Jimmie Allen song), a 2022 song by Jimmie Allen
- Down Home (TV series), an NBC sitcom
- "Down Home", a 2016 song by Brothers Osborne from Pawn Shop (album)
