= Stella Dallas (radio series) =

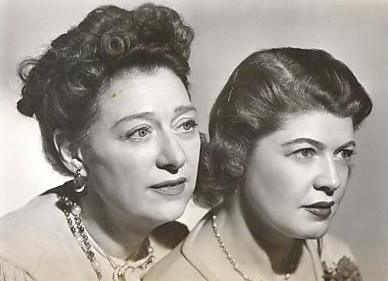
- Anne Elstner and Vivian Smolen
- Running time: 15 minutes
- Country of origin: United States
- Language(s): English
- Syndicates: NBC Radio
- Starring: Anne Elstner; Leo McCabe; Michael Fitzmaurice
- Announcer: Ford Bond; Frank Gallop; Howard Claney; Jimmy Wallington; Jack Costello; Roger Krupp
- Created by: Olive Higgins Prouty (original novel)
- Written by: Frank and Anne Hummert
- Directed by: Ernest Ricca; Richard Leonard; Norman Sweetser
- Produced by: Frank and Anne Hummert
- Original release: October 25, 1937 – December 23, 1955
- Opening theme: "How Can I Leave Thee?"
- Sponsored by: Bayer; Double Dandrine shampoo
- Podcast: The Egyptian Mummy; Stream episode from archive.org

Stella Dallas was an American radio soap opera that ran from October 25, 1937, to December 23, 1955. The New York Times described the title character as "the beautiful daughter of an impoverished farmhand who had married above her station in life."

The series was created and produced by the husband and wife team of Frank and Anne Hummert, based on the 1923 novel Stella Dallas by Olive Higgins Prouty. The 15-minute drama began on October 25, 1937, as a local show on WEAF in New York City, in the wake of the successful movie version starring Barbara Stanwyck, and it was picked up by the NBC Radio network beginning June 6, 1938, running weekday afternoons.

Stella was played for the entire run of the series by Anne Elstner. Her husband Stephen Dallas was portrayed at various times by Leo McCabe, Arthur Hughes and Frederick Tazere. Initially, Joy Hathaway played Stella's daughter Laurel with Vivian Smolen later taking over the role. Laurel's husband was Dick Grosvenor (played by Carleton Young, Macdonald Carey, Spencer Bentley, George Lambert and Michael Fitzmaurice).

The program's opening told the premise of the drama:

We give you now Stella Dallas, a continuation on the air of the true-to-life story of mother love and sacrifice, in which Stella Dallas saw her own beloved daughter, Laurel, marry into wealth and society and, realizing the differences in their tastes and worlds, went out of Laurel's life.

The radio play inspired the name of the home furnishing store Stella Dallas in Dallas, Texas.

== Non-acting personnel ==
Announcers for Stella Dallas were Ford Bond, Frank Gallop, Howard Claney, Jimmy Wallington, Jack Costello, and Roger Krupp. Directors included Ernest Ricca, Richard Leonard, and Norman Sweetser.

== See also ==
- Stella Dallas (novel)
- Stella Dallas (1925 film)
- Stella Dallas (1937 film)
- List of radio soaps
