= Joan Tompkins =

American actress

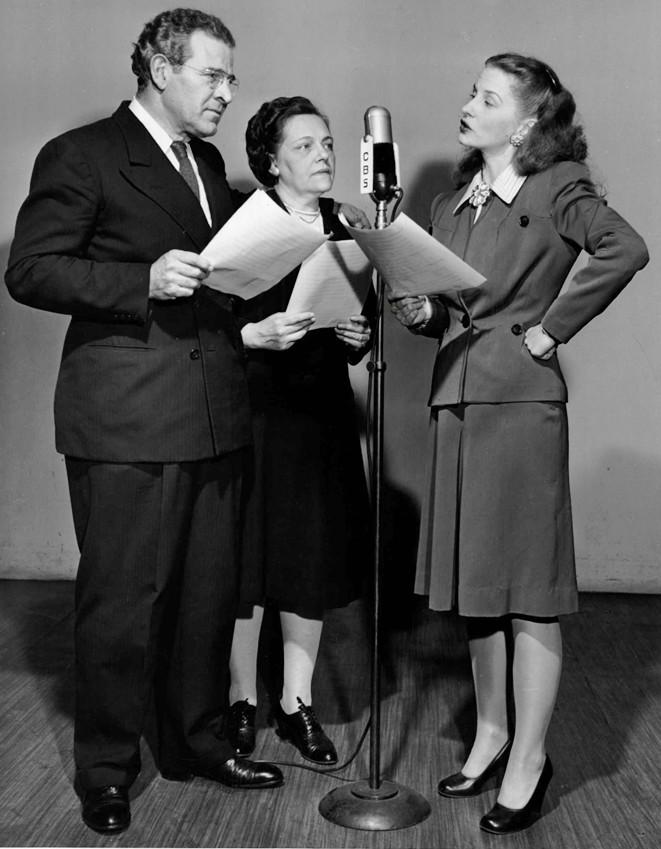
- Tompkins (right) as Susan Price Wells with Cameron Prud'homme and Charme Allen in the radio serial David Harum, 1947
- Born: July 9, 1915; New York, U.S.
- Died: January 29, 2005 (aged 89); Orange County, California, U.S.
- Occupation: Actress
- Years active: 1953-1980
- Known for: The Christine Jorgensen Story; Valiant Lady; Sam Benedict; This Is Nora Drake
- Spouses: Stephen Ker Appleby (m. 1936; div. 1941); Bruce MacFarlane (m. 1942; div. 1951); Karl Swenson (m. 1951; died 1978)
- Children: 4 stepsons

Joan Swenson (July 9, 1915 – January 29, 2005), previously known as Joan Tompkins, was an American actress of television, film, radio, and stage.

== Early life and career ==
A New York City native, the eldest of two daughters born to Merritt E. Tompkins and Florence H. Aitken, Tompkins performed with stock theater companies in Mount Kisco and White Plains, New York. She acted on Broadway in My Sister Eileen, The Golden Journey, Pride and Prejudice, and Fly Away Home.

== Personal life ==
On July 25, 1936, Tompkins married actor Stephen Ker Appleby in Briarcliff, New York. They were divorced on December 4, 1941. She was also married to actor Karl Swenson.

== Radio ==
Her roles on radio programs include:

Program	Role
Against the Storm	Siri Allen
David Harum	Susan Wells
Lora Lawton	Lora Lawton
Our Gal Sunday	Madeline Travers
This Is Nora Drake	Nora Drake
Young Widder Brown	Joyce Turner
Your Family and Mine	Judy Wilbur

== Filmography ==
=== Film ===
Year	Film	Role	Notes
1966	Made in Paris	Ruth (uncredited)	
1969	Popi	Miss Musto	
1970	Zig Zag	Judge Beth Weaver	Crime thriller film
1970	The Christine Jorgensen Story	Aunt Thora	
1970	I Love My Wife	Grandma Dennison	Comedy film

=== Television ===
Her television roles included:

- Adventures in Paradise as Cora Summers in "Assassins" (1961)
- Hazel as Florence Gurney in "Hazel and the Gardener" (1962)
- The New Breed as Mrs. Marsh in "How Proud the Guilty" (1962)
- Bus Stop, as Sarah Jenkins in "The Runaways" (1961) and unknown role in "I Kiss Your Shadow" (1962)
- The Danny Thomas Show, two episodes (1959 and 1962)
- The Lieutenant, two episodes (1963–1964)
- Route 66, as Mrs. Thomas in "Between Hello and Goodbye" (1962)
- The Travels of Jaimie McPheeters as Martha Pollux in "The Day of the Wizard" (1964)
- The Eleventh Hour, three episodes, including the two-parter, "Does My Mother Have to Know?", in the role of Aggie Britt (1964)
- Mr. Novak as Mrs. Douglas Morgan, Sr., in "The Private Life of Douglas Morgan, Jr." (1964)
- Gomer Pyle, U.S.M.C. as Mrs. Harper in "A Date for the Colonel's Daughter" (1964)
- Perry Mason, three episodes (1962–1964)
- Dr. Kildare, three episodes (1962–1965)
- Slattery's People, as Dorothy Ralston in "Question, What Time Is the Next Bandwagon?" (1965)
- The Farmer's Daughter in "Katie's Castle" (1965)
- General Hospital, recurring as Nurse Genevieve Kendall Jones (1967–?)
- My Three Sons, recurring as Lorraine Miller (1967-1970)
- Mannix as Mrs. Dover in "Turn Every Stone" (1967)
- Mission: Impossible as Miss Putnam in "The Seal" (1967)
- Occasional Wife as Mrs. Brahms in "Pilot" and "No Cookie for Dessert" (1966)
- I Dream of Jeannie as General's wife in "Invisible House for Sale" (1968) and Admiral's wife Mrs. Endicott in Jeannie, the Recording Secretary (1970)
- Bewitched as Harriet Walters in "Once in a Vial" (1968)
- The Brady Bunch as Mrs. Tyler in "The Honeymoon" (1969) which was that show's premiere episode
- Lassie, in two episodes, including the role of Mrs. Davis in the 1964 episode "The Little Christmas Tree" and as Katherine in the 1971 segment entitled "The Awakening"
- The Scarecrow as Mistress Cynthia Merton, television play (1972)
- The Mary Tyler Moore Show, as Mrs. Thorn, secretary to Lou Grant, episode "Who's in Charge Here?" (1972)
- Griff, as Ruth in "Elephant in a Cage" (1973)
- Owen Marshall: Counselor at Law, three episodes, including two as a judge (1973–1974)
- Barnaby Jones, three episodes, including role of Judge Edith Royce in "Voice in the Night" (1976)
- The Waltons, as Mrs. Herbert in "The Achievement" (1977), the final appearance of Richard Thomas in the series and the episode in which John-Boy Walton he obtains publication of his first novel
- Emergency! as Maggie Trigg in "The Most Deadly Passage" (1978), made into a television movie the following year
