= David Harum (radio program) =

Radio soap opera

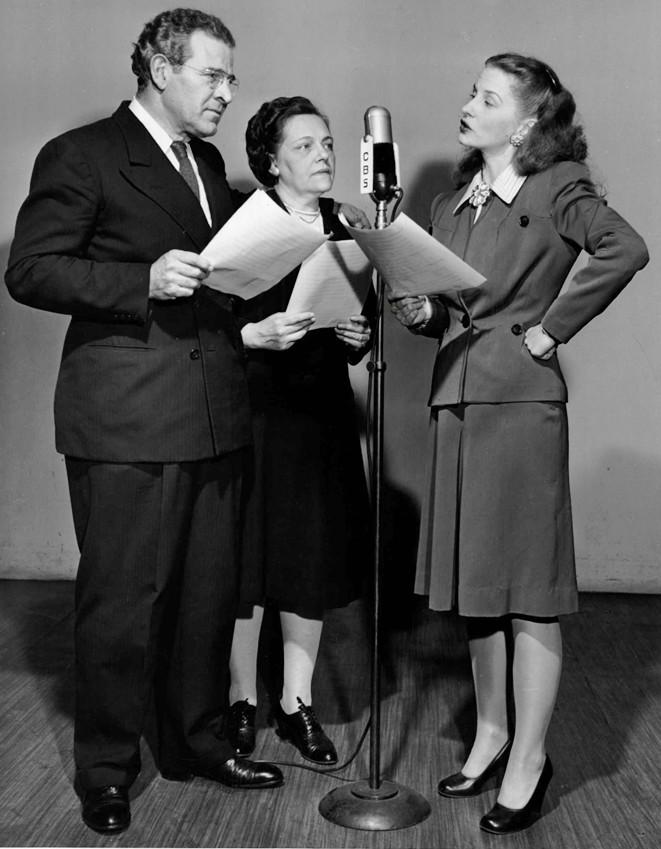
- Cameron Prud'homme (David Harum), Charme Allen (Aunt Polly) and Joan Tompkins (Susan Price Wells) in David Harum.
- Genre: Soap opera
- Running time: 15 minutes
- Country of origin: United States
- Language: English
- Syndicates: CBS; Mutual; NBC
- Starring: Craig McDonnell; Cameron Prud'homme; Wilmer Walter
- Announcer: Ford Bond
- Written by: Peggy Blake; John DeWitt; Noel Gerson; Charles J. Gussman; Johanna Johnson; Mary W. Reeves
- Directed by: Martha Atwell; Himan Brown; John Buckwalter; Arthur Hanna; Ed King; Lester Vail
- Produced by: Frank Hummert; Anne Hummert
- Original release: January 27, 1936 – January 5, 1951
- Opening theme: Sunbonnet Sue

David Harum is an American old-time radio soap opera. It was broadcast on CBS, Mutual, and NBC. It ran from January 27, 1936, to January 5, 1951.

== Background ==
Edward Noyes Westcott wrote the novel David Harum, which was published in 1898. That book became the basis for the David Harum radio program and for films of the same name made in 1915 and in 1934. The character was based on the real-life David Hannum, "a flamboyant banker, farmer, and horse trader", who lived in Homer, New York.

== Format ==
The title character was a banker in Homeville, a village in New England. A confirmed bachelor, David Harum had a helpful disposition and "exposed sinister mavericks that were determined to take advantage of local denizens."

In The Great Radio Soap Operas, Jim Cox wrote:

David Harum was a ray of sunshine to the downtrodden masses in his community. Never bewildered by those who used evil means to gain fortune at the expense of the weak, he vigilantly pursued piety. He was the epitome of rectitude within the heart and soul of small-town America. Even those incessant giveaways that brought his shows into listeners' homes could never diminish the character that personified this kindly little country philosopher. In him, perhaps, his most devoted fans saw something that they too had always wanted to be.

In another book, Radio Crime Fighters: More Than 300 Programs from the Golden Age, Cox described Harum as "a private eye in banker's clothing" who "set out to right the wrongs that were perpetrated against his invariably vulnerable townsfolk."

== Personnel ==
Characters on David Harum and the actors who portrayed them are shown in the table below:

Character	Actor
David Harum	Craig McDonnell; Cameron Prud'homme; Wilmer Walter
Aunt Polly Benson	Charme Allen; Eve Condon
James Benson	Bennett Kilpack
Susan Price Wells	Peggy Allenby; Joan Tompkins; Gertrude Warner
Brian Wells	Donald Briggs; Philip Reed; Ken Williams
Silas Finke	Ray Bramley
John Lennox	Joseph Curtin
Clarissa Oakley	Marjorie Davies
Elsie Anderson	Ethel Everett
Deacon Perkins	Roy Fant
Mark Carter	Paul Ford
Tess Terwilliger	Florence Lake
Zeke Sweeney	Arthur Maitland
Grandpa Eph	Junius Matthews
Henry Longacre	Richard McKay
Clarissa Oakley	Claudia Morgan
Willy	Billy Redfield
Lish Harem	William Shelley
Charlie	Paul Stewart

Frank and Anne Hummert produced the program. Directors were Martha Atwell, Himan Brown, John Buckwalter, Arthur Hanna, Ed King, and Lester Vail. Writers were Peggy Blake, John DeWitt, Noel Gerson, Charles J. Gussman, Johanna Johnson, and Mary W. Reeves. Music was by Stanley Davis. The announcer was Ford Bond.

== Schedule ==
The broadcast schedule for David Harum is shown in the table below.

Starting Date	Ending Date	Network
January 27, 1936	March 27, 1936	NBC Blue
March 30, 1936	January 10, 1947	NBC (Note: The program was also carried on Mutual in 1937-1938 and on CBS February 2, 1942 - May 14, 1943.)
January 13, 1947	January 6, 1950	CBS
January 9, 1950	January 5, 1951	NBC

== Sponsor and promotions ==
David Harum was sponsored by Bab-O household cleaner. During its first nine years of sponsoring the program, Bab-O rose from seventh place among household cleaners to be the leader as measured by dollar volume of sales.

David Harum was among the earliest radio programs to offer premiums to listeners as a way of measuring the show's popularity. In one instance, packets of seed were offered to anyone who sent in 10 cents and a label from the sponsor's product. The 275,000 responses "delighted sponsors and convinced many stations to carry the program." At another time, members of the audience were invited to submit suggestions for a name for Harum's horse, and more than 400,000 responded. The Encyclopedia of Radio noted that David Harum was one of the first radio programs in which products were promoted by the star rather than the announcer.

In 1938, Bab-O's manufacturer, B.T. Babbitt, ventured away from cleaning products to introduce David Harum dog food. Purchasers could obtain a dog leash for 75 cents and a product label and/or a collar for 25 cents and a label. In 1943, Babbit introduced Aunt Polly's Soup Mix, which was named after one of the program's characters. The mix was introduced to coincide with a soup-making project with which Aunt Polly was involved on the program.

Another promotion invited listeners to "actually have a bit of Ireland — a piece of stone from Blarney Castle grounds — to wear... as one of four charms of a lovely golden colored bracelet" by sending a Bab-O label with 25 cents. An on-air promotional announcement noted that the bracelet is "like the bracelets David is having made for June Saunders in our story. But it's real." The promotion resulted in 300,000 labels and quarters being submitted in 10 days.
