= Janice Gilbert =

American actress and bridge expert (c. 1920 - 1992)

Janice Gilbert (c. 1920 - 1992) was an American child actress on radio and a game-show personality on television who became an expert on bridge.

== Early years ==
Gilbert was born Janice Wolfe in New York City c. 1920. Her father was Eddie Wolfe, and her uncle was composer L. Wolfe Gilbert. She and her family moved to Sebring, Florida, soon after her birth, and they moved back to the northern United States when she was 8 1/2 years old. She attended the Professional Children's School and graduated from high school before her 14th birthday. By the time she was 19 years old, she had studied painting at the Art Students' League and was creating portraits of people.

== Radio and television ==
Gilbert's acting career began when she and her mother arrived early at a radio studio and watched the rehearsal. They met some of the actors, and Gilbert told them that she wanted to be an actress. When a child actress who had a role that included a southern dialect failed to appear for the broadcast, Gilbert was given an audition, and she went on the air for the first time that day.

As a youngster on radio programs, Gilbert portrayed children of varied ages, including infants. A 1939 newspaper article said: "The young actress revels in baby roles. She specializes in infant cries, coos, and gurgles and is considered one of several actresses in radio capable of running the gamut of infant sounds." Gilbert (then 16 years old) attributed that versatility to her having "a voice flexible enough to change." She also did dialects.

Gilbert's vocal versatility led to her sometimes playing more than one role on a radio program. On The O'Neills, in addition to her primary role of Janice Collins, she portrayed 2-year-old twins Margie and Junior and infant Bobby. Portraying different characters on a single show meant that Gilbert sometimes conversed with herself. One episode of The O'Neills had her "cry hysterically as Miss Collins, interrupt herself as the twins, who demanded to know what the crying was about, and then try to answer the kids through her hysteria."

Partial List of Gilbert's Roles on Radio
| Program | Character |
|---|---|
| Bachelor's Children | Kathleen Carney |
| Doc Barclay's Daughters | Clarabelle Higgins |
| Gasoline Alley | Nina Clock |
| Her Honor, Nancy James | A baby |
| Hilltop House | Adair |
| Little Orphan Annie | Annie |
| The O'Neills | Janice Collins |
| The Sea Hound | Carol Anderson |
| Second Husband | Fran |

Other radio shows on which she performed included True Confessions, Cloak and Dagger, The Aldrich Family, Aunt Jenny, David Harum, Light of the World, Myrt and Marge, Pepper Young's Family, and True Story. In the late 1940s and early 1950s, Gilbert was the "paying teller" on the radio and television versions of Break the Bank. In that role she presented the prize money to each winner.

== Bridge ==
Tobias Stone, whom Gilbert married in 1955, was "one of the world's top bridge players", and he introduced her to that card game. She won her first tournament four months later, and she set records by achieving life-master status in seven months and by accumulating the most master points in one year. She said that the memory skills that had enabled her to perform in 10-12 radio and TV shows per day were an asset in playing bridge. In 1956, Stone was ranked the best bridge player in the world, and Gilbert was ranked second.

The couple played as a team, and an article in the March 18, 1957, issue of Life magazine related the intensity with which Stone taught Gilbert:

Stone began his cram course on championship play with a blunt lecture: "You can't be a lady. You've got to hate everybody you play against. There must be no casual conversation because it might interfere with your play. You have got to be killer whether you like it or not." He taught her the complicated bidding system that he and Alvin Roth devised and forbade her to open her mouth at the table except to bid. Stone would do all the talking for both of them.

In 1957 they became the only married couple to win the Goldman Pairs in its 64-year history. In 1965 they won the Master Mixed Team Championship. Gilbert also was part of three additional national championship groups, Women's Teams (1956, 1969) and Life Master Women's Pairs (1965).

== Personal life ==
Gilbert's first marriage was to William Miles. She next married William Dunlop. She and Stone divorced in 1975. In 1980 she married David Fulton, a mining engineer. She had a son and a daughter.

== Boating accident and presumed death ==
Gilbert and Fulton were lost in choppy waters when their fishing boat capsized in the Caribbean about 150 miles north of Haiti on November 12, 1992. Ian Miller, Gilbert's attorney said that both were presumed dead, as was another passenger in the 22-foot boat. The Coast Guard and private planes searched the area, and two passengers were rescued from the righted boat on November 13. The search, which had been initiated after Miller alerted authorities that the Fultons had not returned home, ended on November 15.
