= Martha Atwell =

American radio director

- Born: Martha Nivin Atwell; September 12, 1900; Bellevue, Pennsylvania, U.S.
- Died: December 28, 1949 (aged 49); New York, New York
- Education: Mt. Holyoke College; New England Conservatory of Music; Eastman School of Music
- Occupation: Radio director

Martha Atwell (born Martha Nivin Atwell, September 12, 1900 – December 28, 1949) was an American radio director, known for her association with Frank and Anne Hummert.

== Early life and career ==
Atwell was born in Bellevue, Pennsylvania, one of at least four children born to James R. Atwell and Bertha Nivin.

After graduating from Bellevue High School, Atwell attended first Mt. Holyoke College and then the New England Conservatory of Music, where she became a member of the Sigma Alpha Iota International Music Fraternity for Women. Graduating in 1922, she was awarded a scholarship to the Eastman School of Music.

While at Eastman, Atwell portrayed the title character in an ambitious production of Maeterlink's Sister Beatrice, a Play in Three Acts, staged by then-faculty member Rouben Mamoulian. It was Mamoulian who suggested that Atwell switch her focus from music to drama. Taking his advice to heart, she soon became Mamoulian's assistant, and subsequently the scenarist of the Eastman Theater. With the onset of the Great Depression in 1929, Atwell moved to New York, where she was signed as a director by the World Broadcasting System.

Atwell directed episodes of a number of popular radio serials. For the Hummerts, these include:

- Chaplain Jim USA
- David Harum
- Just Plain Bill
- Lora Lawton
- Mrs. Wiggs of the Cabbage Patch
- Young Widder Brown
- Mr. Keen, Tracer of Lost Persons
- Mystery Theater

From 1934 to 1941, she directed episodes of the American Family Robinson, a radio serial which was critical of the New Deal and produced by the National Industrial Council, an arm of the National Association of Manufacturers.

For other producers, she oversaw production of episodes of The Editor's Daughter, Hearts in Harmony, and Linda's First Love. Atwell rarely agreed to artists' special requests, running her productions according to the rules set down by the Hummerts. She was also noted for her insistence on punctuality. On the other hand, CBS vice president James Davidson Taylor, speaking in 1946, recalled how "wonderfully kind and helpful" Atwell had been during his early days as an aspiring announcer/producer.

== Personal life and death ==
Atwell never married. Her death appears to have been a suicide; she was discovered floating in a bathtub in her apartment.
