= Tomasz Machciński =

Polish photographer and actor (1942–2022)

Tomasz Machciński (March 2, 1942 – January 3, 2022) was a Polish photographer and actor. He was known as the "man of a thousand faces". He lived and worked in Kalisz.

== Early life and education ==
Machciński was born in Górki, in the Kampinos Forest; He spent his childhood in hospitals and orphanages, incl. in Kalisz. After World War II, the American actress Joan Tompkins took care of him and he assumed she was his mother. In 1994, their story was presented in the documentary "Child from the Catalog" directed by Alicja Albrecht.

He graduated from school as a precision mechanic in 1963. He started working as an apprentice in office machines at CMB.

== Creations ==
In 1966, he took up photography. He created thousands of photographic self-portraits. He plays well-known characters from history, literature, politics, culture, as well as characters invented by himself. He treats his body as a medium of a half-century consistently implemented artistic project, which is a total open work. He is both a director and actor, make-up artist and costume designer, and finally an artist - photographer and archivist of his own achievements. For a decade, using the capabilities of a digital camera, he has also recorded on-camera performances, which are recordings of improvised vocal pieces. He says about himself: "I don't use wigs, tricks, but I use everything that happens to my body, such as: hair regrowth, tooth loss, diseases, aging, etc."

Individual exhibitions of his works took place, among others in: Copenhagen, Beverly Hills, Warsaw, Wrocław, Łódź, Kalisz, Radomsko and Gniezno. Tomasz Machciński is already established as a leading figure in brut photography, like Miroslav Tichy, Lee Godie, Eugene Von Bruenchenhein, who have only recently been recognized by the institutional art world.

In the year following the establishment, in 2018, of the Tomasz Machciński Foundation, his films were screened at the Whitechapel Gallery (London); that same year he participated in the Rencontres de la Photographie (Arles) in the exhibition PHOTO l BRUT, collection Bruno Decharme & compagnie. In 2020, he is exhibited at the American folk art museum of New York, and finally a great retrospective exhibition will be dedicated to him by the Manggha (Kraków) from May to September 2021. He had a Solo show for Paris Photo 2021.

He took part in two collective exhibitions:

- Center for Contemporary Art Ujazdowski Castle, Warsaw 1992
- Why are there wars in the world. The Art of Contemporary Outsiders, Museum of Modern Art, Warsaw 2016

Sinds 2020 he is represented by galerie Christian berst art brut.

In 2026, his art was among those on exhibition at the American Folk Art Museum.

== Movies ==
Three films were made about his life and work:

- "Amator", dir. M. Nowakowski, (1978),
- "Incognito", directed by H. Dederko (1988),
- "Child from the Catalog" dir. A. Albrecht (1994)

One étude "Ja Machciński" (dir. EK Government) was also produced. Director Henryk Dederko received a distinction for the film "Incognito" at the festival in Nuremberg and the Grand Prix at the Film Festival about Art in Zakopane in 1992.

== Death ==
Machciński died on January 3, 2022, at the age of 79.
