= Gasoline Alley (radio series) =

American radio sitcom

- Genre: Radio sitcom
- Running time: 15 minutes. (5:45 pm – 6:00 pm)
- Country of origin: United States
- Language(s): English
- Syndicates: NBC Blue Network
- Written by: Kane Campbell
- Directed by: Charles Schenck
- Original release: 1931 – January 7, 1949

Gasoline Alley was an American radio sitcom based on the popularity of the newspaper comic strip Gasoline Alley by Frank King. It first aired in 1931 under the name "Uncle Walt and Skeezix".

On February 17, 1941 the show returned on NBC Radio under the name "Gasoline Alley", with almost the same cast. Unusual at the time, it was a literal transfer of the storyline that had appeared in the comics pages that very same morning. It ran on NBC until April 11, 1941, and then switched to NBC's Blue Network on April 28, 1941. It ended its run on May 9, 1941.

The syndicated series of 1948–49 featured a cast of Bill Lipton, Mason Adams and Robert Dryden. Sponsored by Autolite, the program used opening theme music by the Polka Dots, a harmonica group. The 15-minute episodes focused on Skeezix running a gas station and garage, the Wallet and Bobble Garage, with his partner, Wilmer Bobble. In New York, this series aired on WOR from July 16, 1948 to January 7, 1949

== Cast ==
- Skeezix: Bill Idelson, Jimmy McCallion
- Nina Clock: Janice Gilbert, Jean Gillespie
- Wumple: Cliff Soubier
- Ling Wee: Junius Matthews
