= Frank N. Westcott =

American author

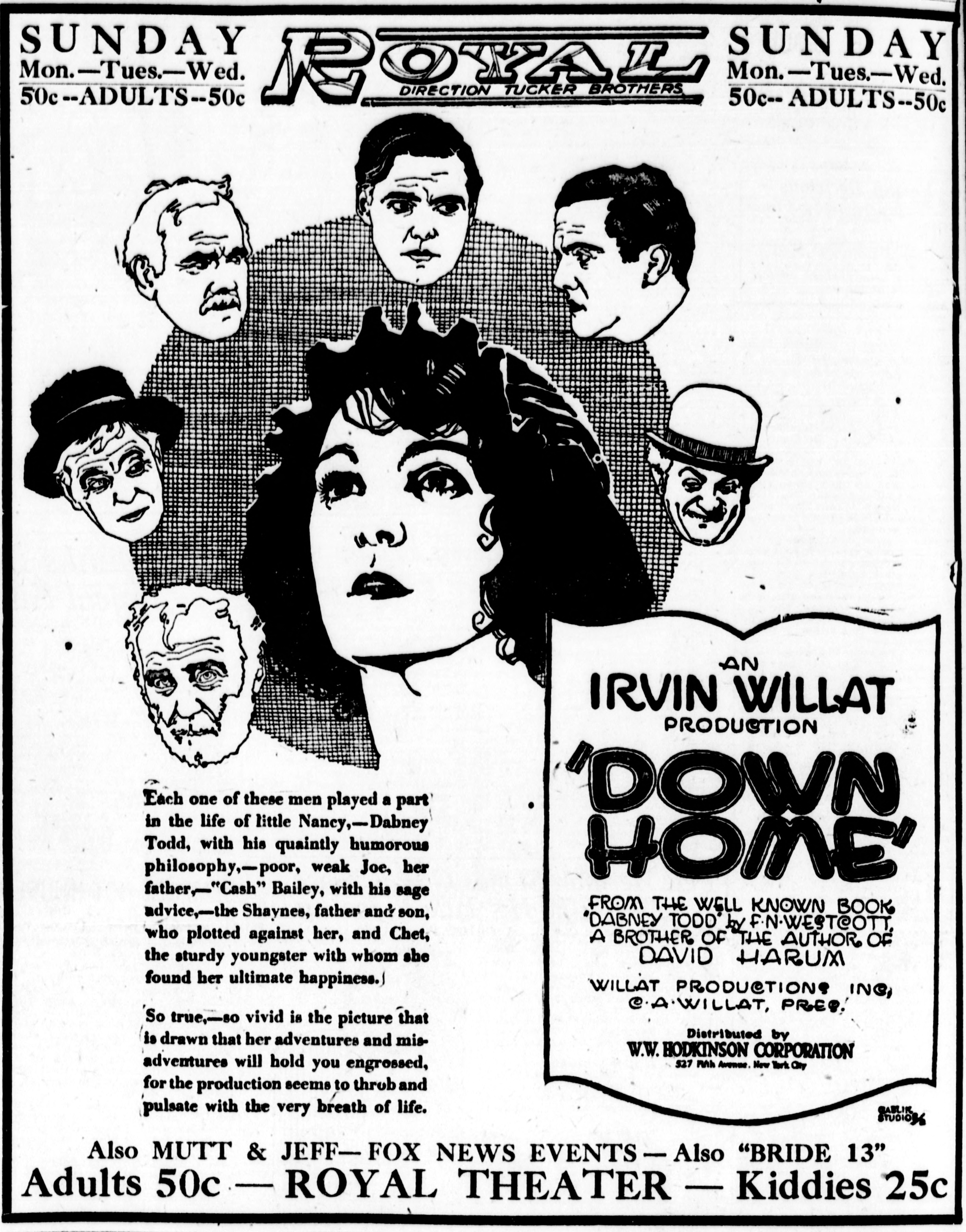
Advertisement for Down Home, based on Westcott's novel Dabney Todd

Frank Nash Westcott (August 8, 1858 – 1915) was a reverend and writer. He was born in Syracuse, New York. He wrote several books on Catholicism, as well as two novels, Hepsey Burke and Dabney Todd.

His father, Amos Westcott, was an influential professor, dentist, dental college founder, and politician who served as an alderman and mayor of Syracuse.

Frank N.Westcott became an ordained minister and served at the St. James Protestant Episcopal Church in Skaneateles, New York.

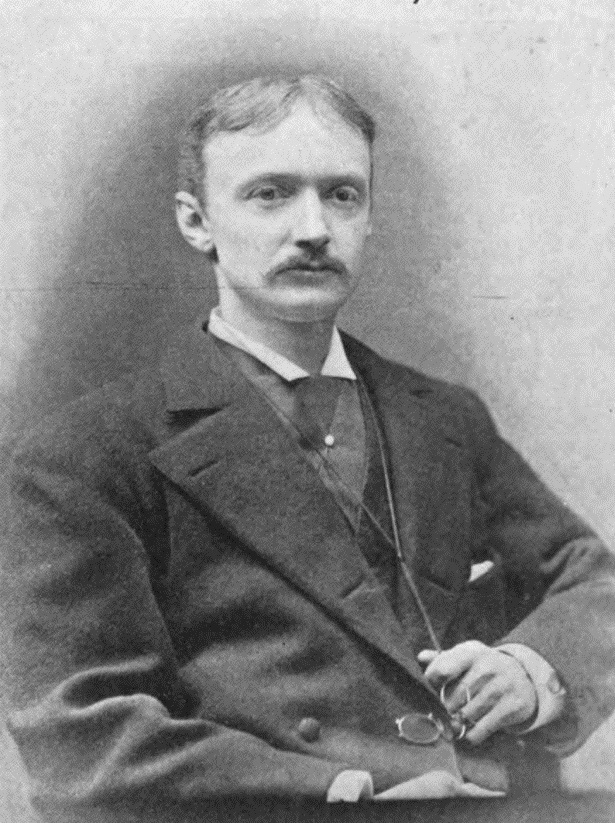
Edward Noyes Westcott, author of David Harum

His brother Edward Noyes Westcott was a banker and writer who authored the popular novel David Harum. Published posthumously in 1898, months after his death, it is set in Central New York.

Struggling with sleeplessness, nervous trouble, and a broken arm, Frank Westcott committed suicide while in hospital in 1915.

== Bibliography ==
=== Catholicism ===
- Philosophy of a Change in the Name of the Church (1898)
- Catholic Principles (1902)
- The Church and the Good Samaritan (1905)
- The Heart of Catholicity (1905)

=== Novels ===
- Hepsey Burke (1915)
- Dabney Todd (1916)

== Filmography ==
- Down Home (1920), based on his novel Dabney Todd
