= Amos Westcott =

American dentist and politician

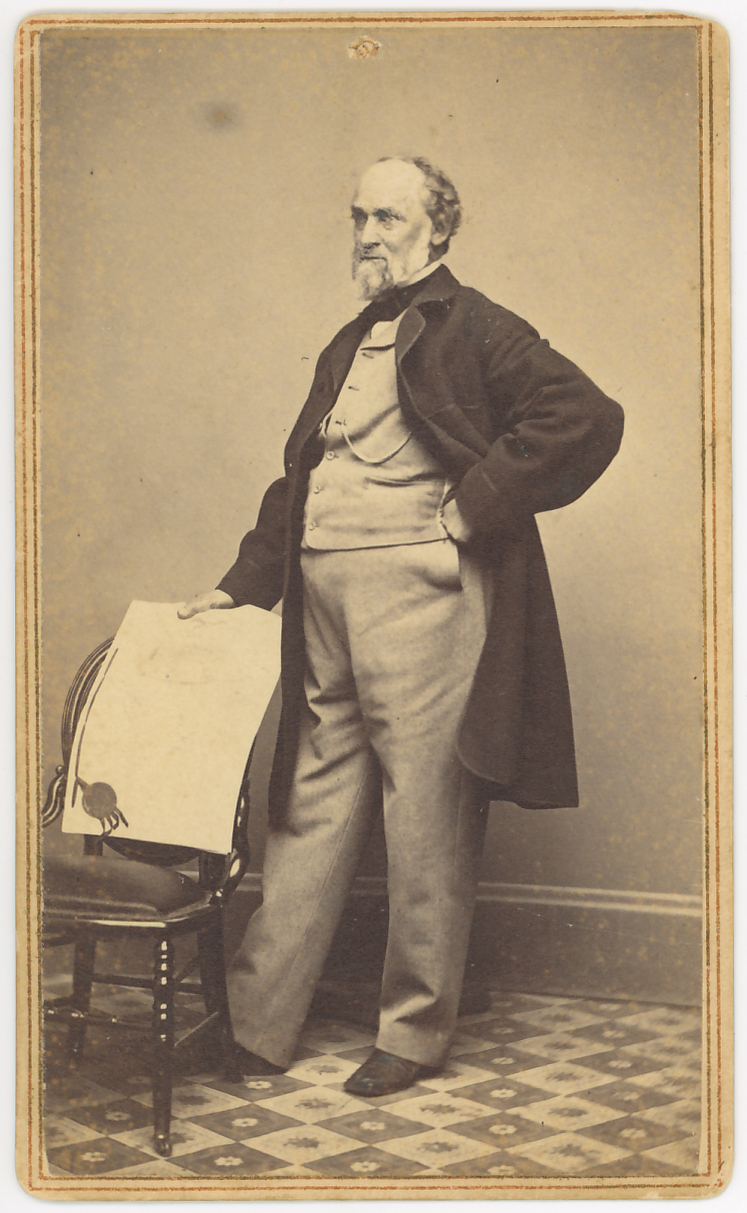
Westcott in 1864

Amos Westcott (April 28, 1815 –July 6, 1873) was an American dentist who served as Mayor of Syracuse, New York, in 1860.

== Biography ==
Amos Westcott was born on April 28, 1815, in Newport, New York, the youngest of seven children. His father, Gorton Westcott, was a farmer. Amos attended local schools but, according to a profile in the 1910 History of Dental Surgery, "as a boy manifested a desire to obtain an education beyond the ability of his parents to provide." As a result, Westcott began teaching district school during the winter in Delphi in Onondaga County, and during the summer attending an academy in Truxton, New York.

Westcott entered Rensselaer Polytechnic Institute in 1834, earning a Bachelor of Natural Science. The next year he was one of the first to receive a degree in civil engineering from the Rensselaer Institute in 1835. After graduation, he taught chemistry, natural philosophy, and mathematics at the Pompey Academy in Pompey, New York, while studying medicine with Jehiel Stearns. Westcott spent 1836 to 1837 or 1838 at the academy, returning to school after, this time at the Geneva Medical College and Albany Medical College, where he graduated with the degree of Doctor of Medicine in 1840.

Westcott settled in Syracuse, New York, the following year, opening a dentistry practice. As a dentist he was a member of the American Society of Dental Surgeons, American Dental Convention and, American Dental Association. In 1859 he was an organizer and first president of the New York State Dental Association. By 1868 he was a founder and first president of the New York Dental Society. Westcott was involved in the early development of dentistry as a formal profession. He worked on aspects of the trade including books and technology. He held the chair of professor of operative and prosthetic dentistry at the Baltimore College of Dentistry from 1846 to 1849. Westcott was involved in founding the New York College of Dental Science in 1852, where he was dean and a professor before it burned down and closed in 1855. He also served as an editor of the American Journal of Dental Science. Westcott was also known as an inventor, creating a version of a butter churn, a door spring, a lock for a door, and jackscrews for teeth.

Westcott was a well-regarded citizen in Syracuse; historian Scott Tribble describes him as "one of Syracuse's most respected and popular citizens" of the era. He soon became involved in local politics, serving first as an Alderman of Syracuse and being elected Mayor in 1860. Nine years later he was a member of a consortium that purchased the Cardiff Giant, an archeological hoax, and displayed it in Syracuse. Westcott's health failed in 1871, and he visited Europe for several years in an unsuccessful attempt to improve his health. He returned to Syracuse and died by suicide on July 6, 1873, with no explanation.

== Personal life ==
Westcott was married twice: first to Cora Babcock, with whom he had three children, Watts, Katherine, and Edward Noyes Westcott; and second to Harriet Nash, with whom he had two children, Margaret Westcott Muzzey and Frank Nash Westcott.
