= Vivian Smolen =

American actress

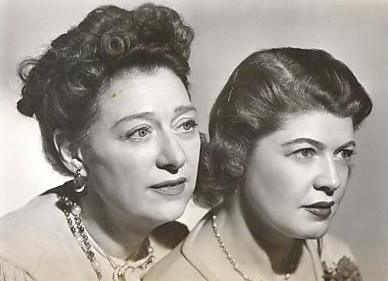
- Anne Elstner and Vivian Smolen in Stella Dallas
- Born: Vivian Smolen; March 7, 1916; New York City
- Died: June 11, 2006 (aged 90)
- Occupation: Actress
- Known for: Acting in radio soap operas
- Spouse: Harold Klein

Vivian Smolen (March 7, 1916 – June 11, 2006) was an actress in the era of old-time radio. She is best known for her work in soap operas, especially portraying Sunday Brinthrope, the title character in Our Gal Sunday and Laurel, the daughter of the title character in Stella Dallas.

Decades after those roles ended, an article in the Chicago Tribune said: "When Vivian Smolen Klein speaks, people listen. There is something in her voice, a memory, a hint of something bygone, something that once was very important."

== Early years ==
Smolen was born in New York City. As an elementary school student, she auditioned and won a part in The Children's Hour in New York. That work brought her $2 per program. She recalled later: "They liked me. I stayed with them a long time." While she was still in school, she also performed on the children's program The Lady Next Door. She graduated from James Madison High School in Brooklyn, New York, in 1933 and attended Brooklyn College.

== Career ==
In 1941, Smolen was picked to play Laurel Dallas in Stella Dallas. Her work on that program helped her to obtain the lead in Our Gal Sunday, a role that she played from 1946 to 1959. The two programs were on the air concurrently, but Smolen said, "It wasn't uncommon to have two big parts at once. I did many parts on many radio programs all the time." Smolen's other work on radio included playing Veronica Lodge on Archie Andrews and Marge Barclay in Doc Barclay's Daughters..

In 1957, Smolen was a member of the supporting cast on a recording of Pinocchio that was issued by Decca Records.

== Later years ==
In the 1970a, Smolen acted on Chicago Radio Theater and did commercials.

== Personal life ==
Smolen married Harold Klein, an executive with Plitt Theatres.
