= William H. Crane =

American actor (1845–1928)

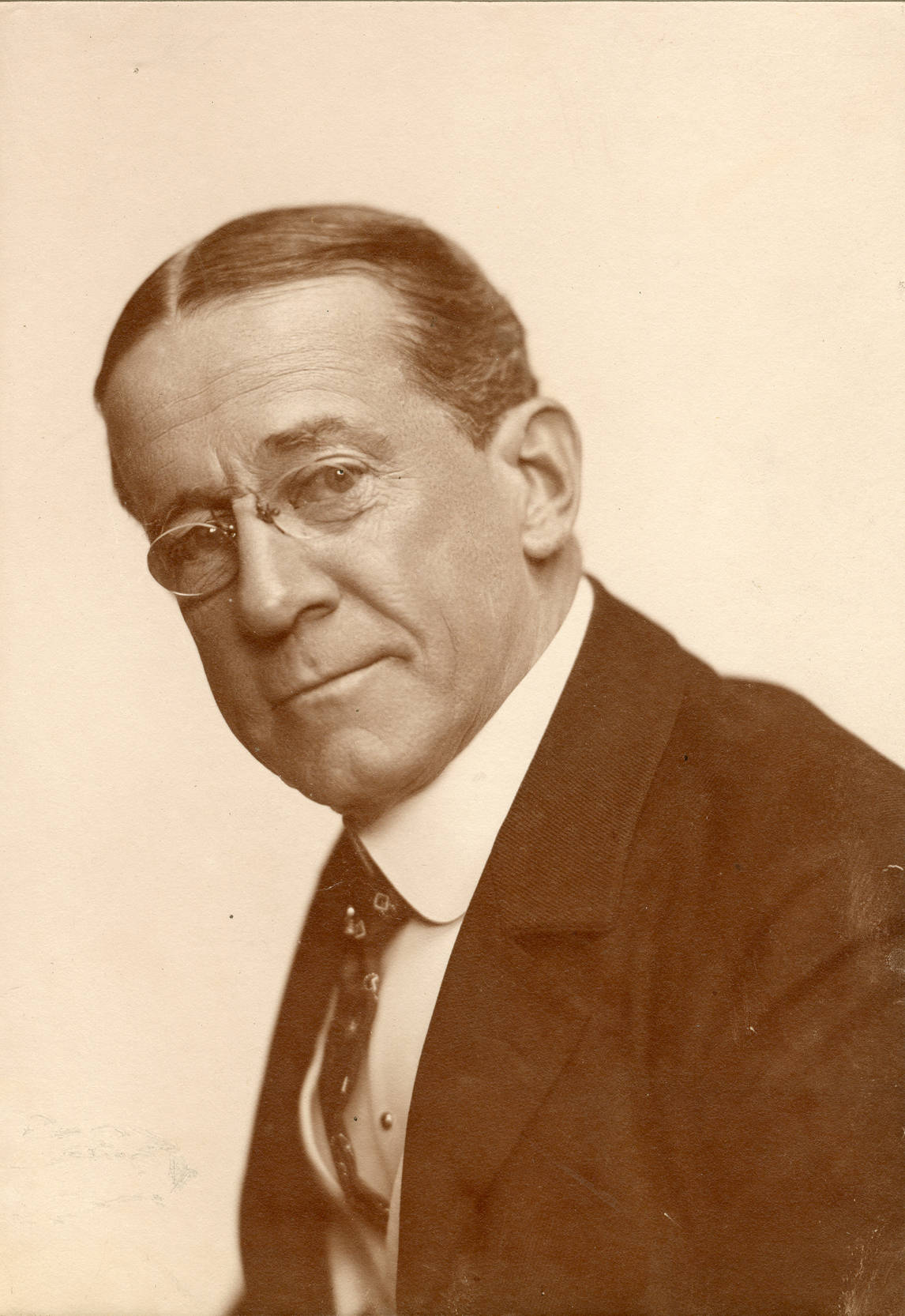
- Crane in 1923
- Born: April 30, 1845; Leicester, Massachusetts, U.S.
- Died: March 7, 1928 (aged 82); Hollywood, California, U.S.
- Occupation: Actor
- Years active: 1863–1928

William Henry Crane (April 30, 1845 – March 7, 1928) was an American actor.

== Early years ==
Crane was born in Leicester, Massachusetts on April 30, 1845. He grew up in Boston and graduated from Brimmer School.

== Career ==
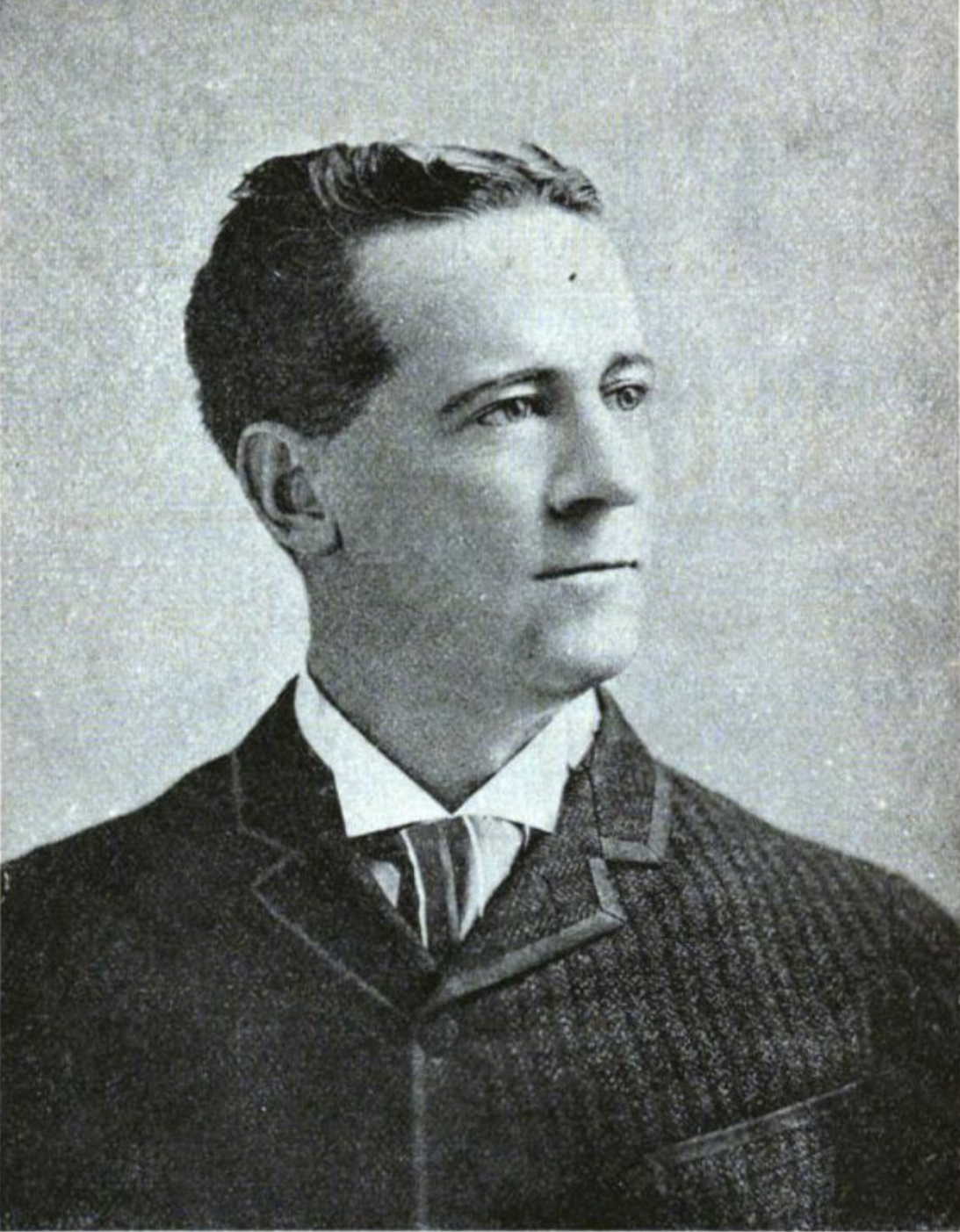
William H. Crane

He made his first professional appearance at Utica, New York, in Donizetti's The Daughter of the Regiment on July 13, 1865. He made his first hit in the legitimate drama with Stuart Robson in The Comedy of Errors and other Shakespearian plays. This partnership lasted for 12 years. He had successes as Le Blanc the Notary in the Victorian burlesque Evangeline (1873) and The Henrietta (1881, with Robson) by Bronson Howard. Subsequently Crane appeared in various eccentric character parts in such plays as The Senator and David Harum.

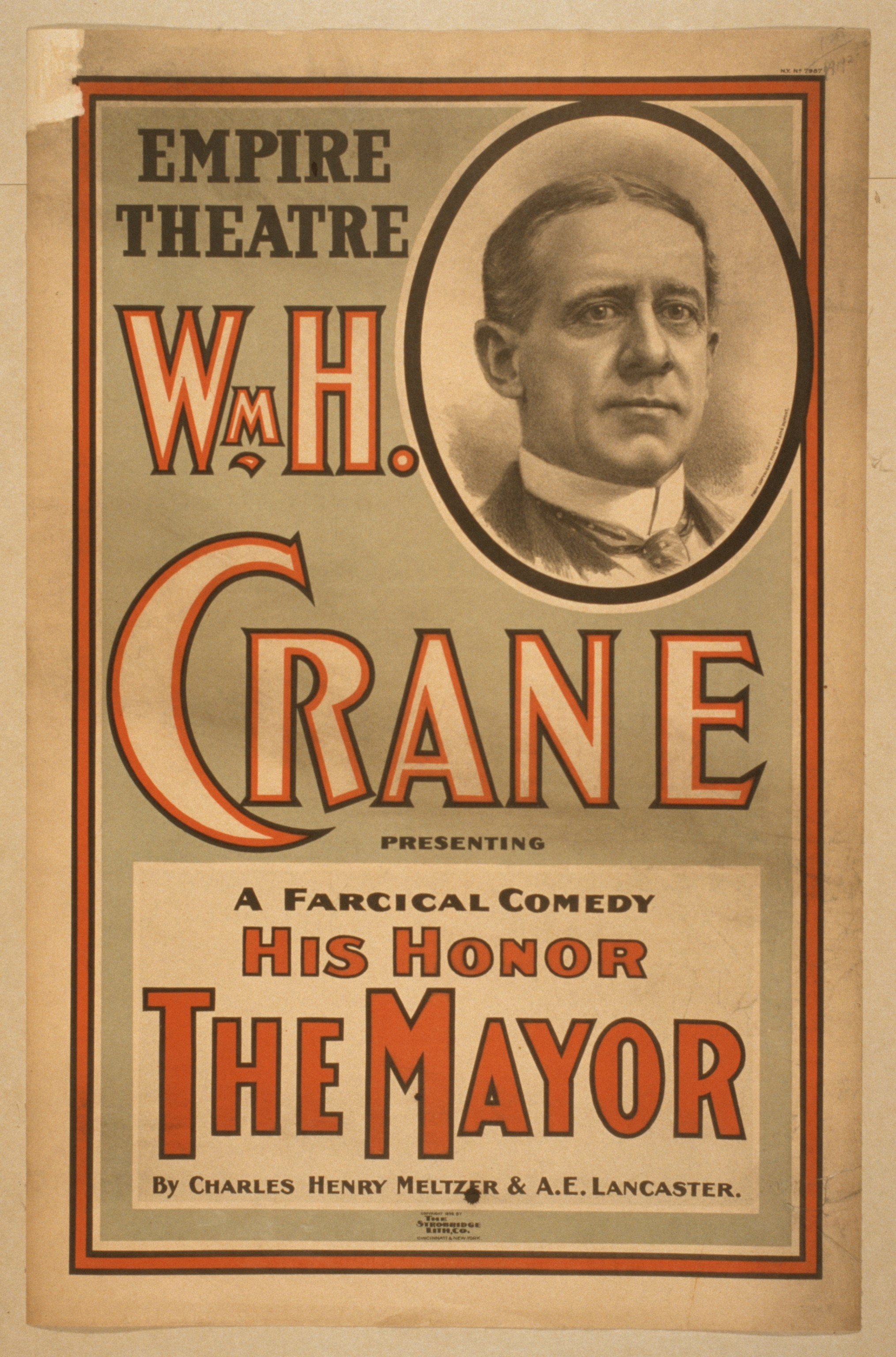
1898 poster for Crane's starring role in the Broadway production of His Honor the Mayor

In 1904 Crane turned to more serious works and played Isidore Izard in Business is Business, an adaptation of Octave Mirbeau's Les Affaires sont les Affaires. In his 70s, Crane appeared in a number of films, notably in a reprise of his role in David Harum (1915). He also appeared in MGM's Three Wise Fools, which was revived on Turner Classic Movies and is available on home video/DVD.

== Personal life ==
Crane married Ella Chloe Myers in 1870, and remained married until his death. Crane was an avid yachtsman and was a founding officer of the Cohasset Yacht Club in 1894. In fact, his yacht "Senator" shared the same name as one of the plays in which he famously appeared. At Crane's summer home in Cohasset (which he called the "Fishing Box") his long-time friend, Chicago saloonkeeper Lewis Williams debuted Cohasset Punch, a blend of rum, wine, and fruit that became very popular in Chicago for decades afterward.

== Death ==
Crane died on March 7, 1928, at the age of 82 in the Hollywood Hotel.

== Partial filmography ==
- The Lamb (1915)
- David Harum (1915)
- The Saphead (1920)
- Souls for Sale (1923)
- Three Wise Fools (1923)
- Souls for Sale (1923)
- True as Steel (1924)
- So This Is Marriage (1924)
