= Howard Claney =

American actor

Howard Moorhead Claney (April 17, 1898 - April 30, 1980) was an American actor, an announcer on old-time radio, and a narrator of films.

== Early years ==
The son of William J. Claney and Mary J. Claney, he was born in the Manchester neighborhood of Pittsburgh, Pennsylvania. After graduating from Allegheny High School, he studied at Carnegie Tech.

He served in the U.S. Army during World War I.

== Career ==
Claney acted on stage before he moved into radio. His Broadway credits included Lolly (1929), King Henry V (1928), Caponsacchi (1926), The Immortal Thief (1926), The Little Poor Man (1925), Macbeth (1924), Voltaire (1922), The S. S. Tenacity (1922), Don Juan (1921), Lillian (1921), Liliom (1921), and A Man of the People (1920). He also worked as stage manager for the Shubert family.

His career in radio began when he announced a remote broadcast of a performance of Vincent Lopez and his orchestra. His first full-time assignment was working as announcer on the Women's Radio Review. Other programs for which he was the announcer included The Voice of Firestone, Log Cabin Dude Ranch, The Famous Actors Guild, Waltz Time, General Motors Concerts, Information Please, Amanda of Honeymoon Hill, American Melody Hour, The American Album of Familiar Music, The Metropolitan Opera Auditions of the Air, Mr. Chameleon, and Stella Dallas.

Claney narrated Vitaphone films, including the Newman Traveltalks Long Bright Land, Land of the Kangaroo, Malayan Jungle, Pearl of the East, Toradja Land, and Isles of Enchantment. He also narrated some films of the Vitaphone Pictorial Revue series.

== Personal life ==
Claney studied art at the Art Students League of New York and the Art Institute of Chicago, with additional studies in London and Paris. In the 1930s, several exhibitions highlighted his work, and he sold many painting in oil and watercolor. He preferred landscapes, especially of scenes from the Pittsburgh area.
