= Second Husband =

American radio soap opera

- Genre: Soap opera
- Running time: 30 minutes 15 minutes
- Country of origin: United States
- Language: English
- Syndicates: CBS
- Starring: Helen Menken
- Announcer: Andre Baruch
- Created by: Frank and Anne Hummert
- Written by: Helen Walpole; Nancy Moore; Elizabeth Todd
- Produced by: Frank and Anne Hummert
- Original release: April 26, 1936 – April 26, 1946
- Sponsored by: Sterling Drugs

Second Husband is an American radio soap opera that aired from 1936 to 1946.

The program told "[t]he dramatic story of Brenda Cummings and the problems that arise within her family when she marries Grant Cummings, her second husband." Widow Brenda's marriage to wealthy Grant Cummings produced problems on two levels—her son and daughter didn't want to accept Grant as their new father, and Brenda wanted a career as a movie actress, which Grant opposed.

Second Husband was one of 35 radio series – many of them soap operas – produced by the husband-and-wife team Frank and Anne Hummert from 1931 through 1960. The conflict regarding Brenda Cummings' desire for a career in movies resembled the situation of Mary Noble in another Hummert program, Backstage Wife.

== Star ==
Helen Menken, who was the first actress to play Brenda Cummings, was a veteran of Broadway plays when the show began. She first appeared in a Broadway production at age 3 and was in another when she was 5. Menken progressed to more substantial roles by the time she was a teenager and "[t]hrough the mid-1920s, she presented a string of powerful performances in challenging dramas." Thus, a newspaper article about Second Husband advised readers: "The series will afford Miss Menken the opportunity of displaying her versatility and acting genius and will enable you radio dialers to hear one of the theater's brilliant actresses in a gripping role."

A 1939 magazine article about Second Husband described Menken as "a perfectionist, which probably accounts for the fact that she is one of the few stars of stage or screen who has been able to make and retain an equal success on the air."

Menken's personal life mirrored her role in the program to an extent, because when the show aired she was married to her second husband. Thus, her real-life experience sometimes affected her work on Second Husband. As an example, she told one reporter, "It wasn't until after my second wedding that I realized what I had missed in not wearing a lovely, flowing, white wedding gown." After acknowledging her sentimental nature, she continued: "When my wedding scene ... came into the script, I went out and bought a beautiful wedding gown. And I was married over the air in it. The way I had always wanted to be married in real life. It was beautiful."

The star's stage experience might also have influenced how the program was broadcast. That same article noted, "Broadcasting Second Husband is almost like putting on a regular stage play, with the curtain rising at the beginning of the show and falling at its end, and all the actors taking curtain calls in response to applause."

== Cross-marketing with magazine ==
Cross-marketing, in which each of two entities promotes the other's product or service, was used to the mutual benefit of radio programs and magazines in the era of old-time radio. Radio historian Elena Razlogova wrote: "The networks and magazines perfected the cross-marketing common among department stores, newspapers, movies, pulps, slicks and comic strips in this period [the 1930s]. Editors and program producers synchronized print and on-air tie-ins.

Second Husband and Radio and Television Mirror magazine exemplified such cross-marketing. The magazine's January 1940 issue carried the first installment of a serial titled "Second Husband." A headline deck on the story's opening spread introduced the serial as follows: "Beginning in intimate diary form, the vivid story of a young mother who thought it was no crime to love and marry again – based on the popular radio serial of the same name."

People at the magazine and the program coordinated promotion of efforts related to the tie-ins. Razlogova cited one example, when the magazine printed a full-page portrait of Brenda Cummings that was promoted on the radio show, "giving the listener no opportunity to miss either event." She added, "Thanks to such precisely orchestrated campaigns, radio shows boosted their ratings while fan magazines jacked up their circulation."

== Broadcast schedule ==
Starting Date	Ending Date	Network	Day(s	Length	Sponsor
April 26, 1936	April 4, 1937	NBC Blue	Sunday	30 minutes	Sterling Drugs*
April 21, 1937	July 28, 1937	NBC Blue	Wednesday	30 minutes	Sterling Drugs*
August 3, 1937	April 14, 1942	CBS	Tuesday	30 minutes	Sterling Drugs*
April 20, 1942	July 31, 1942	NBC Blue	Monday-Friday	15 minutes	sustaining
August 3, 1942	April 26, 1946	CBS	Monday-Friday	15 minutes	Sterling Drugs*

- Sterling's products advertised on Second Husband were primarily Bayer Aspirin, Dr. Lyon's Tooth Powder and Phillips' Milk of Magnesia.

== Cast ==
Cast members were as follows:

Role	Actor/Actress
Brenda Cummings	Helen Menken; Cathleen Cordell
Grant Cummings	Joseph Curtin; Richard Waring
Milton Brownspun	Ralph Locke
Bill Cummings	Carleton Young; Ralph Lee Robertson
Ben Porter	Jay Jostyn
Marion Jennings	Arlene Francis; Madaline Belgrad
Edwards, the butler	William Podmore
Fran Cummings	Janice Gilbert; Charita Bauer; Mercer McCloud
Dick Cummings	Tommy Donnelly; Jackie Grimes
Louise McPherson	Ethel Wilson
Irma Wallace	Joy Hathaway
Valerie Welles	Jacqueline De Wit
Marcia	Judy Blake
Peter	Dick Nelson
Dr. Mark Phillips	Vinton Hayworth

Others in the cast were Lois Hall, James Meighan, Colleen Ward, Virginia Dwyer, Nancy Bashein, John Thomas, Skippy Homeier, Peter Donald and Stefan Schnabel. The orchestra leader was Vic Arden.
