= This Is Nora Drake =

American old-time radio soap opera

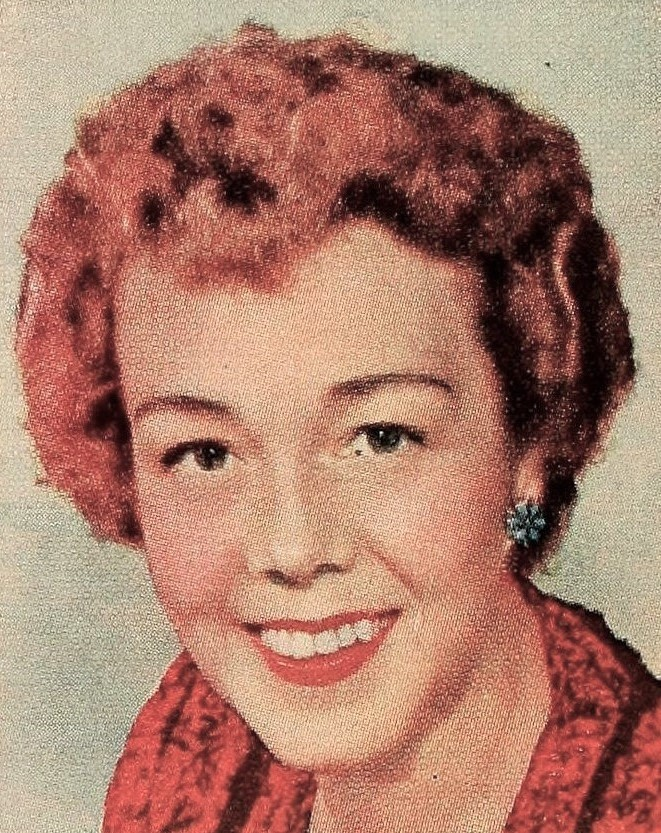
- Mary Jane Higby, one of the actresses who portrayed the title character
- Genre: Soap opera
- Country of origin: United States
- Language(s): English
- Syndicates: NBC; CBS
- Starring: Charlotte Holland; Joan Tompkins; Mary Jane Higby
- Announcer: Bill Cullen; Peter Roberts
- Written by: Julian Funt; Milton Lewis
- Directed by: Dee Engelback; Art Hanna; Charles Irving
- Original release: October 27, 1947 – January 2, 1959
- Sponsored by: Toni hair care products Bristol-Myers

This Is Nora Drake is an American old-time radio soap opera. It was broadcast from October 27, 1947, to January 2, 1959, first on NBC and later on CBS. Beginning in May 1948, it was also carried on CFRB in Toronto, Ontario, Canada.

== Format ==
The opening (read by announcer) called the show "This Is Nora Drake, a modern story seen through the window of a woman's heart".

Nora Drake was a nurse at Page Memorial Hospital in a medium-sized town. She was one of several women featured on radio soap operas who "were adept at becoming involved with scoundrels, liars, or, as was most likely, married men." In Nora's case, she was a nurse in love with Dr. Ken Martinson, who married nurse Peggy King before he realized that his true love was Nora. Peggy refused to divorce Ken and had a "furious confrontation" with Nora, after which Peggy was crippled in an automobile accident, leaving Ken feeling obligated to remain married. Among other efforts against Nora, Peggy (whose father was a trustee of the hospital) sought her father's help in getting Nora fired. After five years of making life difficult for Ken, Peggy was killed, which enabled Nora to pursue her romance.

Nora's life gained another complication when her long-lost father returned. He proved to be unstable and impulsive, and he went to prison for shooting a gambler.

A review of the November 12, 1947, episode of the program in the trade publication Billboard indicated that it followed a familiar pattern for radio soap operas: "The stuff shapes up as old hat, but commercial".

== Personnel ==
Characters in This Is Nora Drake and the actors who portrayed them included those shown in the table below.

Characters and Actors in This Is Nora Drake
Character	Actor(s)
Nora Drake	Charlotte Holland; Joan Tompkins; Mary Jane Higby
Ken Martinson	Alan Hewitt; Leon Janney
Peggy King Martinson	Mercedes McCambridge; Joan Alexander; Lesley Woods
Arthur Drake	Joseph Conway; Ralph Bell; Everett Sloane
Charles Dobbs	Grant Richards
Claudia Morgan	Ruby Dee
Vivian Jarrett	Ruth Newton
Irene Maloney	Ann Shepherd
Cass Toderp	Joe Mantell
Doctor Jensen	Arnold Robertson
Suzanne Turrie	Joan Lorring
Gillian Gray	Charlotte Manson
Rose Fuller	Irene Hubbard
Fred Molina	Larry Haines
Andrew King	Roger De Koven

Others often heard on the program included Elspeth Eric, Lucille Wall, Les Damon, Robert Readick, and John Sylvester, Bill Cullen and Peter Roberts were announcers. Charles Paul was the organist. Directors included Dee Engelback, Art Hanna, and Charles Irving. Writers included Julian Funt and Milton Lewis.

== Schedule and sponsors ==
As of February 9, 1948, This Is Nora Drake was carried on 156 NBC stations. On April 12, 1948, the show's broadcasts were added to CBS while they continued on NBC. Episodes using the same scripts were heard on NBC at 11 a.m. Eastern Time and on CBS at 2:30 Eastern Time. That plan resulted from discussions that involved representatives of the networks, the sponsor (Toni hair care products) and the Foote, Cone & Belding advertising agency. The show replaced Marriage for Two on CBS.

Beginning in January 1954, Bristol-Myers took on half-sponsorship of the program, with Toni retaining the other half after having been the sole sponsor. That was the first time Bristol-Myers sponsored a program on CBS.

== Book adaptation ==
In 1950, Duell, Sloan and Pearce published The Nora Drake Story by Cornelia Blair. The 251-page novel focused on Drake's early life, her nursing education, and her experiences in hospitals through the time when she and her classmates received their caps. A review in The American Journal of Nursing concluded, "Its appeal is primarily to the marriage-minded, for though the author stoutly denies ... that nursing school is a 'glorified matrimonial bureau,' this is the tour de force of the book."

== Cutout doll books ==
In 1952, variety stores in the United States sold two paper doll cut-out books based on characters in This Is Nora Drake. Six women from the show, including Drake, were featured, with uniforms and off-duty clothes for nurses.
