= American Family Robinson =

Anti-New Deal propaganda program in the United States (1930s)

The American Family Robinson was a radio soap opera but, unlike its competitors, championed an anti-New Deal agenda and promoted free markets, private property, and self-reliance, reflecting the agenda of the National Association of Manufacturers (NAM). Through its front group, the National Industrial Council, NAM created the show to counter public support for the New Deal, promoting entrepreneurship and limited government. Set in the fictional town of Centerville, the series followed Luke Robinson, a newspaper editor, his wife Myra, their daughter Betty, and son-in-law Dick Collins, with Luke often extolling the virtues of thrift and property rights in a style reminiscent of later fictional patriarchs like Judge Hardy.

== Overview ==
Facing resistance from major networks like NBC, which feared violating the Federal Communications Commission’s “public interest” mandate due to the show’s anti-New Deal stance, the producers turned to syndication. The National Industrial Council funded the program’s transcription onto phonograph discs, distributed to local stations. The show, directed by Martha Atwell and written by Douglas and Marjorie Bartlett Silver, gained a fan base for its engaging plots and characters, notably William “Windy Bill” Winkle, a humorous socialist with get-rich-quick schemes. Windy’s debates with Luke highlighted the show’s themes, critiquing socialism while defending individual effort, as seen in exchanges about wealth distribution and business ethics.

Despite its popularity, The American Family Robinson faced challenges from regulatory pressures and the National Association of Broadcasters’ “voluntary code” against controversial content. By 1940, the show’s political edge dulled, shifting to generic soap opera themes amid wartime priorities and industry caution.
