= George Ansbro =

American radio announcer

- Born: January 14, 1915; Brooklyn, New York
- Died: November 5, 2011 (aged 96); Bloomfield, Connecticut, U.S.
- Occupation: Radio announcer

The cast of Young Widder Brown with Florence Freeman, who had the title role, seated in the middle and announcer George Ansbro at top left.

George Ansbro (January 14, 1915 – November 5, 2011) was a radio announcer for NBC and ABC for six decades, working with soap operas, big bands, quiz shows and other programs.

== Early years ==
Ansbro was born January 14, 1915, in Brooklyn, New York. His first experience of the radio “showbiz” came on a family trip to Springfield, Massachusetts. His family went to the B.F. Keith Theater and saw Singer’s Midgets. The group sang “A Kiss in the Dark”.

Ansbro’s mom signed him up for singing lessons with a man named Thomas Hannom. The lessons didn’t last long, but the one thing that Hannom left him was a connection with someone at the station WNYC. The station decided one day to open their microphones to newcomers to show off their singing ability. Hannom took George the station where he introduced him to Tommy Cowan.

He began at NBC in 1928 as a boy soprano on Milton Cross' Sunday show, Children's Hour (also known as Coast to Coast on a Bus). Three years later, he was hired as an NBC page in 1931, but he was soon employed as an announcer at NBC. On Friday, May 18, 1934, radio columns in New York newspapers noted that Bert Parks of CBS would be “relinquishing his status as New York’s youngest network staff announcer to the newly appointed George Ansbro on the NBC announcing staff.”

== Parade of programs ==
Ansbro’s radio career included announcing for The Avenger, FBI Washington, Chaplain Jim, Ethel and Albert, When a Girl Marries, Treasury Salute, Wake Up, America, Young Widder Brown, and the popular Dr. I.Q. quiz show. He also announced for Across the Board and other television shows. During these years, he lived in Manhattan at 50 East 10th Street and thus could be at an NBC microphone in a matter of minutes.

By 1948, with NBC Radio's Blue Network subsidiary having led to the formation of the ABC Television Network, Ansbro had moved into television announcing as well. He would ultimately become one of ABC's longest-lasting and principal live voice-overs, in most of the network's weekday and weekend dayparts, along with the rotating staff of announcers.

In the early 1950s, Ansbro had a Monday-Friday 4:30-5 p.m. (Eastern Time) disc jockey program in New York. A Billboard review noted an unusual aspect of the program: "Manhattan Maharajah features a tongue-in-cheek East Indian poet spinning pop platter favorites of the new West." The reviewer cited "the maharajah's (George Ansbro) deliberate, sonorous-voiced reading of mystic couplets, complete with college humor-type punch lines."

Come the 1980s, the majority of Ansbro's announcing was during the ABC daytime lineup, handling sponsor plugs for their daytime soap operas especially, mid-break bumpers (specifically for One Life to Live) and the show preview announcements that were run during end credits. However, in prime time, Ansbro would still be heard occasionally.

During the 1970s, he appeared on two shows looking back at vintage radio, beginning with ABC's Return To Studio 1A (1970). Radio's Golden Age which aired July 16, 1976, on WMUK-FM (Kalamazoo, Michigan), featured an interview with Ansbro about early radio soap operas. It was written and produced by Eli Segal for Western Michigan University.

In a letter dated October 1, 1986 (the 55th anniversary of his hiring by NBC), Ansbro was acknowledged by ABC's then-parent owner Capital Cities for not only being the oldest employee of ABC and its derivatives, but for being the longest-tenured employee of any network in the history of American broadcasting. Ansbro continues to hold the record to this day, having served fifty-eight years, three months and twelve days with ABC upon his retirement on January 14, 1990, his 75th birthday. His retirement heralded turnover in ABC's on-air voiceover staff in 1990; that summer, two more tenured staff announcers, Ed Jordan and Wally Parker, also retired. In August, the daytime shifts once covered by Ansbro, Jordan and Parker were officially taken over by Ken Lamb, who in 2008 became ABC's chief booth announcer. (Bill Rice, who had become ABC's senior announcer in 1990, retired in 2008; also retiring that year was Sid Doherty, who primarily announced the Saturday morning lineup from 1990 to 2002.)

== Memoirs ==
Ansbro wrote a book about his radio experiences, I Have a Lady in the Balcony: Memoirs of a Broadcaster in Radio and Television (McFarland, 2000). The title is taken from the once familiar catch phrase heard weekly on Dr. I.Q. Leonard Maltin did the foreword for the book.

== Death ==
Ansbro was a resident of Spring Lake, New Jersey. He died on November 5, 2011, in Bloomfield, Connecticut, aged 96.

== Read ==
- I Have a Lady in the Balcony: Memoirs of a Broadcaster in Radio and Television
