= Anne Elstner =

American actress

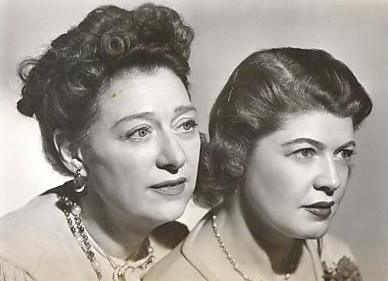
- Anne Elstner (left) and Stella Dallas co-star Vivian Smolen
- Born: January 22, 1899; Lake Charles, Louisiana
- Died: January 29, 1981 (aged 82); Doylestown, Pennsylvania
- Other name: Anne Matthews
- Occupation: Actress
- Spouse(s): Jack Matthews, Jr.
- Parent(s): Joseph and Sallie Elstner

Anne Elstner Matthews (January 22, 1899 – January 29, 1981) was an American actress best known for her role in the radio soap opera Stella Dallas during its entire run from 1937 to 1955. For 18 years, Elstner voiced the serial's title character, described by The New York Times as "the beautiful daughter of an impoverished farmhand who had married above her station in life."

== Early years ==
Elstner was born in Lake Charles, Louisiana, the youngest of eight children born to Joseph and Sallie Elstner. She moved from her childhood home at the age of seven, and began a series of moves across the country with her family, including "a number of years" in San Benito, Texas, as her father, an accountant, moved from job to job.

She attended Senn High School in Chicago for her freshman year before transferring to Mount de Chantal Visitation Academy, a private Catholic all-girls school in Wheeling, West Virginia that was her mother's alma mater, where she played lead roles in school performances and plays before graduating from the school in 1918.

== Stage ==
Moving to New York City, Elstner worked a variety of jobs and enrolled at the American Academy of Dramatic Arts. A role as an understudy in the play Liliom led to her breakout role on Broadway in the 1923 production of Sun-Up. A July 27, 1923, review in The Wall Street Journal commended Elstner "for her faithful delineation of the unattractive but moving mountain girl."

She married Jack Matthews, Jr., at Manhattan's Little Church Around the Corner, after which she left the stage and moved with her husband to a farm in Maryland. When the farming didn't work out, she returned to New York in 1928 and was given the opportunity to reprise her lead role in Sun-Up.

== Radio ==
Elstner broke into radio in the early 1930s on the half-hour-long serial drama Moonshine and Honeysuckle, which led to a career in which she performed thousands of roles in radio performances. (Contrary to the aforementioned source's citing "early 1930s," a December 3, 1923, newspaper lists Elstner as a reader in a 7:30 a.m. program on WEAF in New York City. Another newspaper in 1954 reported, "Miss Elstner got her first radio role way back in 1923.") Moonshine and Honeysuckle ran on NBC 1930–1933. Elstner played Cracker Gaddis in "serialized stories about incidents in the lives of a group of mountain people."

At one point she was performing on ten radio programs a day. Her signature role came in 1936, when she was selected from dozens who auditioned for the title role in Stella Dallas, a serial based on the novel of the same name written by Olive Higgins Prouty. The role of her husband, Stephen Dallas, was portrayed during the course of the show's run by Arthur Hughes, Neil Malley, Leo McCabe and Frederick Tazere. During the show's run she commuted daily from here home in Stockton, New Jersey, missing only one performance during the show's 18-year-long run on NBC Radio from 1937 to 1955.

Together with her husband, Elstner operated a restaurant in Lambertville, New Jersey in 1953 called River's Edge, and would work at the restaurant after returning home from her radio performances. The couple operated the restaurant until 1973. With authority from the show's producers, she was given permission to rename it as "Stella Dallas' Rivers Edge Restaurant", drawing fans seeking to have the opportunity to meet the proprietor and star.

She joined Arthur Godfrey among the 21 members of the first class of honorees inducted into the National Broadcasters Hall of Fame.

== Death ==
Elstner died of a stroke on January 29, 1981, at Doylestown Hospital in Doylestown, Pennsylvania.
