= Chaplain Jim =

American radio war drama series (1942–1946)

Chaplain Jim is an American radio war drama that began on April 20, 1942, and ended on June 30, 1946. It began on the Blue Network and later moved to the Mutual Broadcasting System.

== Premise ==
Based on true events, episodes featured the title character as he ministered to United States Army personnel during World War II, providing counsel to help them deal with emotional, moral, and spiritual problems. Some episodes had him on leave in the United States, where he helped soldiers' families. The program had the form of a soap opera, as stories progressed in a serial format. John Lund and Don MacLaughlin portrayed Chaplain Jim. Alan Bunce portrayed Doctor Walters, and Selena Royle played nurse Leona Devereaux.

MacLaughlin's depiction of the title character led many listeners to think that the actor was a clergyman himself. That was not the case, although MacLaughlin said that he came "from a long line of ministers" and had begun his college studies planning to go into the ministry. He saw Chaplain Jim as a man who would give straight answers when people approached him with their problems. He said that he considered Chaplain Jim to be a counterpart of Francis P. Duffy, who was a chaplain in World War I.

== Production ==
The United States Department of War produced the program, which originated from New York, as a way to boost morale in the United States. An organ played God Bless America for the show's musical bridges. Many episodes ended with Chaplain Jim providing some advice or uplifiting words followed by a prayer. The closing often included his request for listeners to write to servicemen who were on duty overseas.

Blackett-Sample-Hummert, Inc. produced Chaplain Jim. Lawrence M. Klee was the writer, and Richard Leonard directed. George Ansbro and Vinton Hayworth were the announcers, and Rosa Rio was the organist.

== Schedule ==
Chaplain Jim debuted as a quarter-hour sustaining program on the Blue Network at 10:45 a.m. Eastern Time on April 20, 1942, and continued on that schedule through September 4, 1942. On September 6, 1942, it became a half-hour show at 2 p.m. E. T. on Sundays, still on the Blue Network, and it remained in that time slot through April 22, 1945. The program was moved to Mutual effective with the April 29, 1945, episode, still on Sundays at 2 p.m. E. T.. It was off the air from December 9, 1945, until February 3, 1946, when it returned on Sundays at 10:30 a.m. E. T. Its last broadcast was on June 30, 1946.

== Critical response ==
A review of the premiere episode in Time magazine said that the depiction of a "trite situation" was "tried & true". It concluded by saying, "Despite its shallow quality, this khaki serial may well explain many perplexing army matters to womenfolk who are worried about their men in the armed forces."

The trade publication Variety, in a review, said that Chaplain Jim focused on the human, personal aspects of the war rather than on war's military and political aspects. The review said that the show was "primarily a case of putting daytime serialization into khaki and sprinkling liberally with camp jargon."
