= Our Gal Sunday =

American soap opera

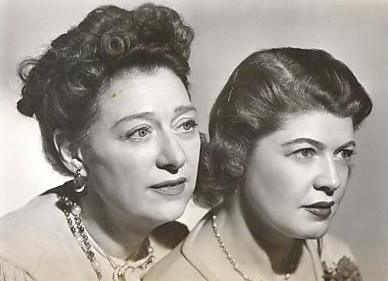
- Anne Elstner and Vivian Smolen
- Genre: Soap opera
- Country of origin: United States
- Language: English
- Starring: Dorothy Lowell; Vivian Smolen; Karl Swenson; Alistair Duncan
- Created by: Frank and Anne Hummert
- Written by: Helen Walpole; Jean Carroll
- Directed by: Stephen Gross; Arthur Hanna; Frank Hummert; Anne Hummert
- Produced by: Frank Hummert; Anne Hummert
- Original release: March 29, 1937 – January 2, 1959
- Opening theme: "Red River Valley"

Our Gal Sunday is an American soap opera produced by Frank and Anne Hummert, network broadcast via CBS from March 29, 1937, to January 2, 1959, starring Dorothy Lowell and, after Lowell's 1944 death, Vivian Smolen in the title role.

The origin of this radio series was a 1904 Broadway production, Sunday, which starred Ethel Barrymore.

== Characters and story ==
The Hummerts adapted the Broadway play into a long-running melodramatic radio serial about a Colorado orphan who marries a British aristocrat. It began when two grizzled miners, Jackie and Lively, found a child abandoned and left at the door of their mountain cabin. She was given the name Sunday because that was the day she entered their lives. Later, her last name was given as Smithson. As an adult, she was desired by her childhood friend, Bill Jenkins. She fell under the spell of wealthy Englishman Arthur Brinthrope, who came to check his silver mine. Arthur was shot by Jackie, who wanted to prevent him from running away with Sunday. Arthur's brother, Henry, arrived, eventually marrying Sunday. The couple moved to their Black Swan Hall estate in Virginia, where they lived with their adopted son, Lonnie, and their two natural children, Caroline and Little Davy, who was crippled by a hit-and-run driver.

Dorothy Lowell had the title role from 1937 to 1944. When she died in childbirth at age 28, she was replaced by Vivian Smolen, who portrayed Sunday from 1944 to 1959. Leading reference sources claim that Lowell continued to star in the radio program until 1946, but those books and websites are obviously incorrect since Lowell died in 1944.

The show opened with this question:

Once again, we present Our Gal Sunday, the story of an orphan girl named Sunday from the little mining town of Silver Creek, Colorado, who in young womanhood married England's richest, most handsome lord, Lord Henry Brinthrope. The story that asks the question, "Can this girl from a mining town in the West find happiness as the wife of a wealthy and titled Englishman?"

"Red River Valley" was the series' theme music. The announcers were Ed Fleming, Jim Fleming, John Reed King, Art Millett, Bert Parks, Charles Stark, Warren Sweeney and John A. Wolfe.

== See also ==
- List of soap operas

== Listen to ==
- Our Gal Sunday (September 21, 1939)
- Our Gal Sunday
