= Down Home (film) =

1920 film by Irvin Willat

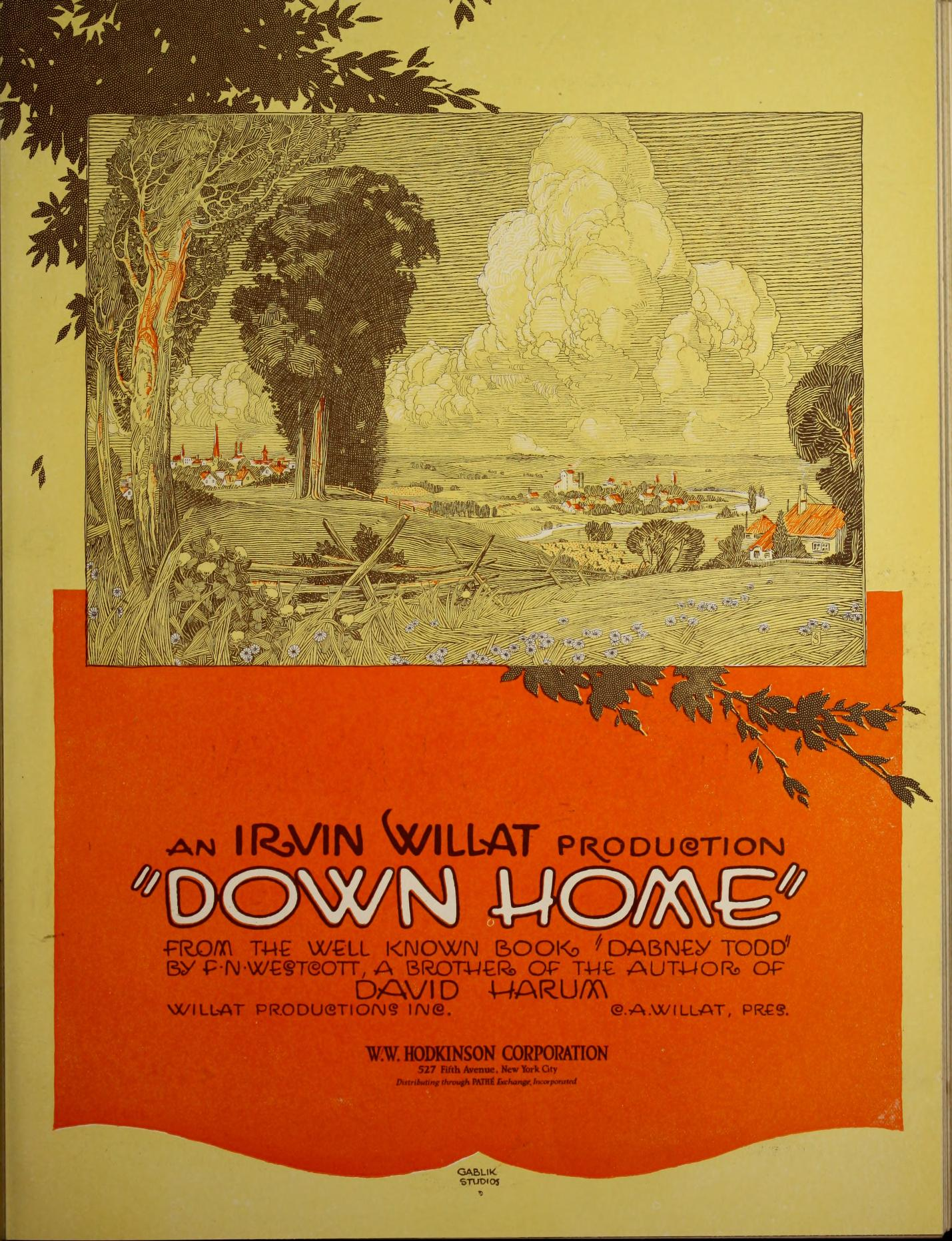
- Newspaper poster
- Directed by: Irvin Willat
- Written by: Irvin Willat (scenario)
- Based on: Dabney Todd by Frank N. Westcott
- Produced by: Irvin Willat
- Starring: Leatrice Joy
- Cinematography: Frank Blount; Andrew Webber
- Distributed by: W. W. Hodkinson Corporation
- Release date: October 1920
- Running time: 70 minutes
- Country: United States
- Language: Silent (English intertitles)

full feature film

Down Home is a 1920 American silent drama film written, directed, and produced by Irvin Willat and starring Leatrice Joy and James Barrows. It was distributed by the independent film distributor W. W. Hodkinson. A copy survives at the Library of Congress.

The film is based on the novel Dabney Todd, by F. N. Westcott, which was also probably a basis of Something to Think About, directed by Cecil B. DeMille, which was produced at the same time.

== Cast ==
- Leatrice Joy as Nance Pelot
- James O. Barrows as Dabney Todd (credited as James Barrows)
- Edward Hearn as Chet Todd
- Aggie Herring as Mrs. Todd
- Edward Nolan as Martin Doover
- William Robert Daly as Joe Pelot (credited as Robert Daly)
- Sidney Franklin as Cash Bailey (credited as Sidney A. Franklin)
- Bert Hadley as Reverence Mr. Blake
- Frank Braidwood as Larry Shayne
- James Robert Chandler as Deacon Howe (credited as Robert Chandler)
- Nelson McDowell as Lige Conklin
- Florence Gilbert as Clerk
- J. P. Lockney as Barney Shayne, Larry's Father
- William Sloan as Townsman (credited as William Sloane)
- Helen Gilmore as Townswoman
