= David Harum (1915 film) =

1915 film by Allan Dwan

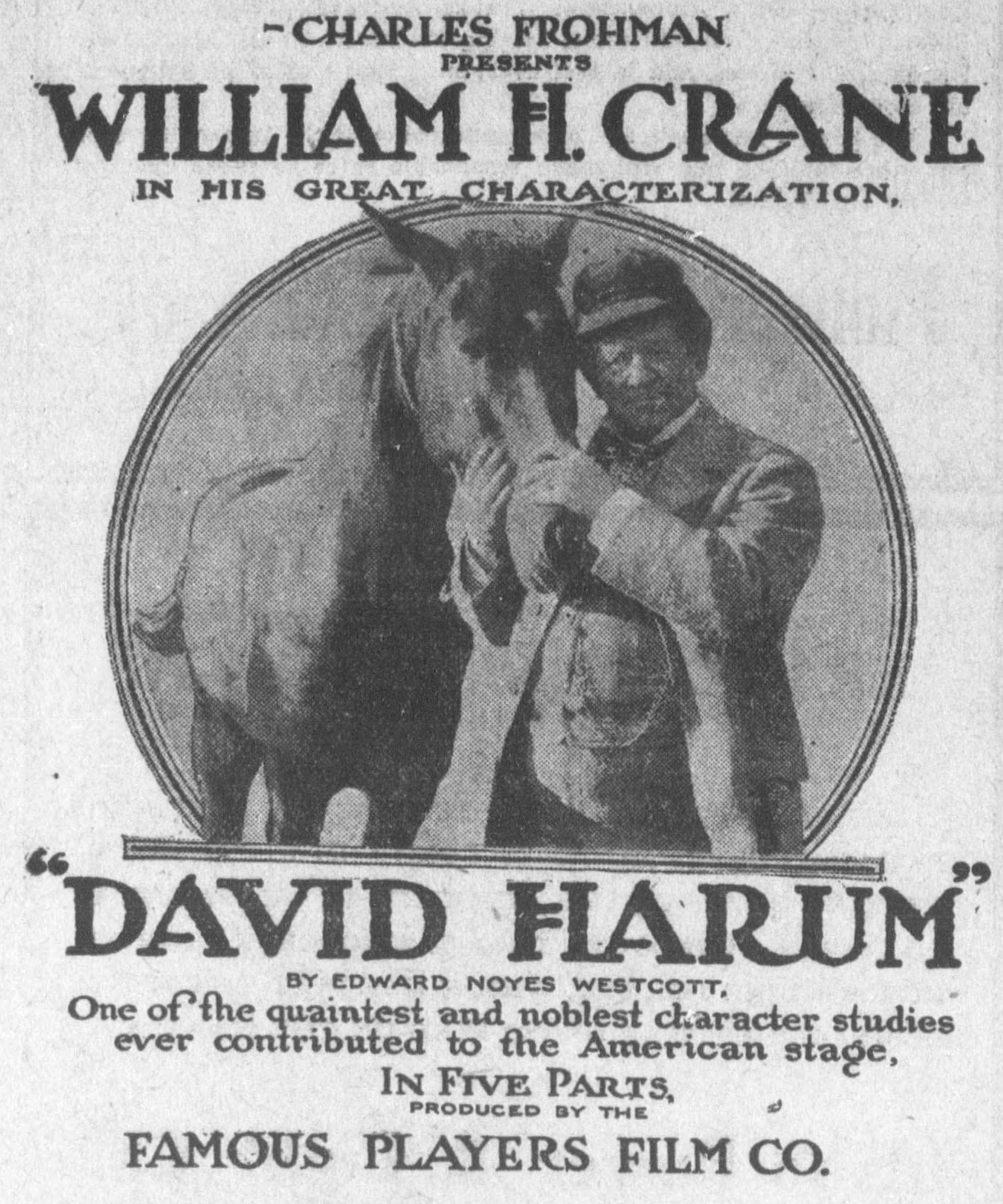
- Newspaper advertisement
- Directed by: Allan Dwan
- Written by: Allan Dwan
- Based on: David Harum by Edward Noyes Westcott
- Produced by: Adolph Zukor
- Cinematography: Harold Rosson
- Production company: Famous Players Film Company
- Distributed by: Paramount Pictures
- Release date: February 22, 1915
- Running time: 5 reels
- Country: United States
- Languages: Silent; English intertitles

David Harum is a 1915 American silent comedy-drama romance film written and directed by Allan Dwan, produced by Famous Players Film Company and distributed by Paramount Pictures. It is based on the 1898 novel of the same name by Edward Noyes Westcott and the 1900 Broadway play based on the novel, starring William H. Crane (Crane also starred in two subsequent Broadway revivals). Crane agreed to star in the film (which was his debut) only if the film was written exactly as the play. David Harum is the only film of Dwan's for Famous Players that still survives. A print is preserved at the George Eastman Museum in Rochester, New York and the Cinémathèque française in Paris.

The novel was again adapted for the screen in 1934 starring Will Rogers in the title role.

== Cast ==
- May Allison - Mary Blake
- Harold Lockwood - John Lenox
- William H. Crane - David Harum
- Kate Meeks - Aunt Polly, David's sister
- Hal Clarendon - Chet Timson
- Guy Nichols - Deacon Perkins
- Russell Bassett - Bit role
