= Charme Allen =

American actress

- Born: Charme Willa Wright; November 19, 1890; Dayton, Ohio, U.S.
- Died: October 4, 1980 (aged 89); Englewood, New Jersey, U.S.
- Resting place: Woodland Cemetery and Arboretum, Dayton, Ohio, U.S.
- Other name: Charme Wright
- Education: Cincinnati Conservatory of Music
- Occupations: Actress, pianist
- Years active: 1908–1961
- Spouse: Joseph Brown Allen (m. 1913; died 1962)

Charme Allen (born Charme Willa Wright, November 19, 1890 – October 4, 1980) was an actress in old-time radio, on television, and on the stage, as well as a pianist, best known for her long tenure as Aunt Polly on the radio serial David Harum. She was also the voice of Borden's Elsie the Cow at the 1939 World's Fair and the original narrator for the American Ballet Theatre's debut production of Prokofiev's Peter and the Wolf.

== Early life and career ==
Born in Dayton, Ohio, Allen was the only child of Theresa Wolf and Charles A. Wright. She was performing in public as early as June 1902, when, at age 11, she was one of several piano students giving a recital at the studio of Lottie Schaeffer. By age of 16, she was listed in the Dayton business directory as a music instructor. Her interest in acting begin to develop shortly thereafter, as she attended the O'Brien School of Elocution and Dramatic Art. However, in deference to the steadfast opposition of her mother (who envisioned her daughter as a concert pianist), she continued her musical studies at the Cincinnati Conservatory of Music while restricting her dramatic endeavors to local summer stock, initially with the Wright Huntington Players and later the Manhattan Stock Company. As she later recalled, "I took the roles the others didn't want. They were servant and other character parts. I suspect they gave me more valuable training than the heroine got."

Following the premature death of her mother in 1912, and a catastrophic flood which destroyed her place of employment and nearly proved fatal, Wright abruptly wed her colleague and fellow Conservatory alumnus, Joseph B. Allen, and the couple soon relocated to Buffalo, New York, where they would reside for more than 20 years.

In Buffalo, Allen joined the musician's union and quickly found work with local pit orchestras. Shortly thereafter, she connected with drama instructor Jane M. Keeler at the Twentieth Century Club, where she studied for approximately five years before becoming a member of Keeler's Studio Theater Players.

In the table below is a chronological listing of some of Allen's more notable radio roles.

=== Radio ===
Year	Title	Role	Notes
1930–?	Nine O'Clock Show	various, inc. May Robson and Marie Dressler	
1932–?	King's Castle	Mrs. Perkins (the caretaker's wife)	
1935	Melody Master	Mother Clemens	
1935	The March of Time	"frequent parts"	
1935–?	The Story of Mary Marlin	Sarah Jane Kane	
1935	Backstage Wife	Mercy	
1937–1951	David Harum	Aunt Polly Benson	1941: "She has been Polly in the David Harum series four years." 1942: "Charme Allen is known as 'Radio's Aunt Polly.' She has won the hearts of thousands of radio listeners as the genial sister of David Harum."; 1947: "Prud'homme, who portrays 'David Harum' and Charme Allen, who is known to millions as 'Aunt Polly,' are eagerly awaited visitors every morning." 1949: "Prud'homme [as] the kindly but shrewd small-town banker and Charme Allen as the lovable Aunt Polly..."; 1950: "Charme Allen portrays Aunt Polly Benson, and Cameron Prud'homme portrays David Harum..." "Charme Allen returns to 'David Harum.'"
1937–?	Pretty Kitty Kelly	Mrs. Murger	
1938–?	Valiant Lady	Mrs. Scott	
1938–?	County Seat	Sarah Whipple	With Ray Collins as Doc Hackett and Cliff Carpenter as Jerry Whipple.
June 30, 1938	Pulitzer Prize Plays; Ep. "Why Marry?"	NA	
1939	Meet the Dixons		
July 20, 1939	John Brown's Body	NA	Radio adaptation of Benet's poem by Norman Corwin.
December 1940–January 1941	The Citadel	NA	Serialized adaptation of A.J. Cronin novel.
1941–?	As the Twig Is Bent	Mrs. Carlton	The show that would later become We Love and Learn.
1941–1942	Into the Light	Ma Owen	
1942	Mother and Dad	Mother	Succeeds the late Effie Palmer.
1942–1944	Abie's Irish Rose	Mrs. Mueller	
1943–?	Cohen and the Detective	NA	
1944	Columbia Presents Corwin; Ep. Untitled	Mrs. Peters	Written, produced and directed by Norman Corwin; with Fredric March as Hans Peters, Hester Sondergaard as the Music teacher, Kermit Murdock as the Editor, and Michael Ingram as the Nazi.
September 1, 1945	Grand Central Station; Ep. NA	NA	Co-starring Berry Kroeger and Doro Merande
June 10, 1950	Grand Central Station; Ep. "Marked Money"	NA	Co-starring Parker Fennelly, Mason Adams, Thomas Hoier and Robert Emhardt
March 17, 1951	Grand Central Station; Ep. "Missing Persons Miss Money"	NA	Co-starring Edgar Stehli
March 22, 1952	Grand Central Station; Ep. "No Prize for Elmer"	NA	Co-starring Parker Fennelly, Bobby Nick, Joseph Sweeney and Vaughn Taylor
February 28, 1953	Grand Central Station; Ep. "Return Ticket"	NA	Co-starring Darren McGavin, Jean Gillespie, and Chester Stratton
October 1945–November 1945	The World's Great Novels; Ep. "Adventures of Huckleberry Finn"	NA	Serialized adaptation.
Circa May 1947	Perry Mason; Ep. "The Case of the Bartered Bride"	Agnes	
June 28, 1948	We Love and Learn	Mrs. Carlton	
1949	The Second Mrs. Burton	Mother Burton	Replacing Hollywood-bound Evelyn Varden
1950–?	Just Plain Bill	NA	"John McGovern, Charme Allen, and Richard Janaver added to 'Just Plain Bill.'"
1952	Lorenzo Jones	NA	
April 1953	Front Page Farrell; Ep. ?	NA	"Helen Shields, Charme Allen, Sydney Smith, Cathleen Cordell, Florence Robinson in the new 'Front Page Farrell' sequence."
1956–?	The Right to Happiness	NA	"Charme Allen, Sydney Smith, Cameron Andrews and Lawrence Zerbe into the cast of 'Right to Happiness."

=== Television ===
Year	Title	Role	Notes
December 1, 1952	Robert Montgomery Presents; Ep. "Post Road"	NA	
December 11, 1955	American Inventory; Ep. "In These Hands"	NA	Written by Edgar Marvin, starring House Jameson

=== Theatre ===
Although Allen never did get to realize her "fondest wish" (that being to "play on Broadway [and] show New York what I really can do"), she did manage to give New York—or at least its Off-Broadway contingent–at least one reasonably representative sample when she appeared in a 1948 revival of Lennox Robinson's Church Street, a one-act play presented by New Stages Inc. as the opening act of a double bill with Jean-Paul Sartre's The Respectful Prostitute. And while the critical consensus regarding the two pieces presented that night strongly favored the latter, that imbalance did not carry over into their assessment of performances, least of all as regards Allen. J.T.S. of The New Leader wrote, "This work is given a somewhat less smooth performance, but the women especially are good, from Florida Friebus as the fluttery and starving Miss Pettigrew to the soberly sharp work of Charme Allen as Aunt Moll." The Hollywood Reporter's Lee Rogow devoted so much space to Sartre's play that he had scarcely a paragraph left for Church Street, which he judged, in closing, "an overlong but interesting curtain-raiser [that] was illuminated by beautiful performances by Florida Friebus, Charme Allen, and Gertrude Corey." Similarly, Women's Wear Daily critic Thomas R. Dash, leaving himself little space to discuss Church Street, made sure to acknowledge the "superb portrayal by Charme Allen of the cantankerous yet highly intelligent Aunt Moll." Even the Times' Brooks Atkinson, who, alone among these critics, judged Church Street's presentation as harshly as he did the work being presented, exempted exactly one participant from this critique.

"'Church Street' turns out to be more charade than drama, and with the exception of Charme Allen's acting, the performance is typical of most non-commercial productions; the characters are always just sliding out of the actors' grasp."

== Personal life and death ==
In Dayton, Ohio, on April 7, 1913, prompted by their harrowing experience in that season's well-publicized flood, Charme Wright and her then employer, saxophonist/clarinetist and bandleader Joseph Brown Allen, were married. Their union produced one child, radio actress Willa Gene Allen, and lasted until her husband's death on June 9, 1962.

On October 4, 1980, Allen died following a long illness at age 89, at the Actor's Fund Home in Englewood, New Jersey, where she had moved ten years prior. Allen's remains are interred at the Woodland Cemetery and Arboretum, in Dayton, Ohio.
