= Ford Bond =

American radio personality (1904–1962)

- Born: David Ford Bond; October 23, 1904; Louisville, Kentucky, U.S.
- Died: August 15, 1962 (aged 57); St.Croix, Virgin Islands of the United States
- Presenting career
- Show: Kraft Music Hall
- Style: Announcer
- Country: United States

David Ford Bond (October 23, 1904 – August 15, 1962) was an American radio personality.

He was the announcer for several popular radio shows in the 1930s and 1940s, earning him a spot on the This Is Your Life television show.

For his work on radio, Bond has a star on the Hollywood Walk of Fame at 6706 Hollywood Blvd.

== Early years ==
Ford Bond was born in Louisville, Kentucky, on October 23, 1904. He was the son of James Clarence Bond and Mary A. Bond. His father, a dealer in sporting goods, wanted him to go into medicine, but he was more interested in music. He was a football star in high school. He served as a captain in the Army Officers Reserve Corps from 1924 to 1926. In 1927 he moved to Alexandria, Louisiana, to be music and educational director at Emmanuel Baptist Church. He resigned from that position in November 1928 and began working in radio in Louisville.

== Radio ==
Bond began working on radio at WHAS in Louisville, Kentucky, and joined NBC in 1928.

For 20 years in the 1930s and 1940s, he was the announcer for several radio soap operas and other shows, including the advertising voice for a sponsor's product, Bab-O cleanser. He was also a sports announcer for NBC radio in the 1930s, calling college football games as well as the 1934 Major League Baseball All-Star Game and 1934 World Series. He also served as radio consultant for Thomas E. Dewey during Dewey's 1948 campaign for president.

For almost 30 years, Bond was the spokesman for Cities Service petroleum company, "the longest sponsor-announcer association in the history of radio."

== Politics ==
Bond was the New York State Republican Committee's consultant for radio and television from 1942 through 1953. In that role he worked on the campaigns of Thomas E. Dewey for governor and president and John Foster Dulles for senate, among others. He directed the radio and TV components in New York state of Dwight D. Eisenhower's 1952 presidential campaign, and he was a consultant to United States Senator Irving M. Ives from 1946 to 1952.

== Later years ==
Bond retired from broadcasting in 1953 "to go into the building business in the Virgin Islands."

== Personal life ==
Bond served in the Coast Guard Reserve from 1938 to 1942. He married Mary Elizabeth Ford on March 25, 1927, in Louisville. He also was married to Lois Bennett, a singer.

== Death ==
Bond died at St. Croix, Virgin Islands on August 15, 1962.

== Appearances ==
This is a partial list of Bond's appearances on radio and television.

=== Radio ===
- The American Melody Hour: Christmas Program (1947) .... Announcer
- Fun At Breakfast (1946) .... Announcer
- Manhattan Merry-Go-Round (1937) .... Announcer
- Kraft Music Hall (1934) .... Announcer
- Easy Aces (1930) .... Announcer

=== Television ===
- This Is Your Life (1954) .... Himself
- Cities Service Band of America (1949) .... Announcer
