= Young Widder Brown =

1938-1956 radio drama series

- The cast of Young Widder Brown with Florence Freeman (Ellen Brown) seated middle. Announcer George Ansbro is at top left.
- Genre: Daytime serial drama
- Running time: 15 minutes
- Country of origin: United States
- Language: English
- Syndicates: Mutual; NBC
- Starring: Florence Freeman; Bud Collyer
- Announcer: George Ansbro
- Created by: Frank and Anne Hummert
- Directed by: Martha Atwell
- Produced by: Frank and Anne Hummert
- Original release: 1938 – June 12, 1956
- Opening theme: "In the Gloaming"
- Other themes: "Wonderful One"
- Sponsored by: Sterling Drugs

Young Widder Brown was a daytime radio drama series broadcast on NBC from 1938 to 1956. Sponsored by Sterling Drugs and Bayer Aspirin, it daily examined the life of "attractive Ellen Brown, with two fatherless children to support."

The convoluted storyline focused on the efforts of Ellen, in her early thirties, to bring up her two children in the small town of Simpsonville, West Virginia, where she supported herself by running a tearoom, despite continual tragedies in her life. (Another source refers to Simpsonville as "a small Midwestern town.")

Produced by Frank and Anne Hummert, this soap opera series opened with the theme music "In the Gloaming" as rendered by organist John Winters. Heard in the title role during the 18-year run were Florence Freeman (1938–54) and Wendy Drew (1954–56). Ellen Brown was romanced by Peter Turner (Bud Collyer) and Anthony Loring (Ned Wever). Ellen's children were Janey (Marilyn Erskine) and Mark (Tommy Donnelly). Supporting actors included Bess McCammon, Joan Tompkins, and Kay Strozzi.

Directors for the series included Martha Atwell, Richard Leonard and Ed Slattery. The announcer was George Ansbro.

The program was broadcast Monday-Friday at 4:45 p.m. Eastern Time.

== See also ==
- List of radio soaps
