= David Harum (1934 film) =

1934 film directed by James Cruze

- Theatrical release poster
- Directed by: James Cruze
- Screenplay by: Walter Woods
- Story by: Edward Noyes Westcott
- Starring: Will Rogers; Louise Dresser; Evelyn Venable; Kent Taylor; Stepin Fetchit; Noah Beery, Sr. Roger Imhof
- Cinematography: Hal Mohr
- Edited by: Jack Murray
- Music by: David Buttolph
- Production company: Fox Film Corporation
- Distributed by: Fox Film Corporation
- Release date: March 3, 1934
- Running time: 83 minutes
- Country: United States
- Language: English

David Harum is a 1934 American comedy film directed by James Cruze and written by Walter Woods. The film stars Will Rogers, Louise Dresser, Evelyn Venable, Kent Taylor, Stepin Fetchit, Noah Beery, Sr. and Roger Imhof. The film was released on March 3, 1934, by Fox Film Corporation.

== Plot ==
The film is set during the Panic of 1893.

In the first scene, David Harum, a banker from the small town of Homeville, is visiting aristocratic General Woolsey in New York City. The general recommends John Lennox for employment at Harum's bank. The general also asks Harum to 'give his opinion' on a horse. Harum offers $100 to buy the horse and the General immediately and gleefully says 'Sold!' which makes Harum realizes he has been taken. The General cheerfully explains that the horse is a balker, that is, it will unexpectedly balk when pulling a carriage. This is the General's revenge for a previous horse deal when Harum had gotten the advantage. The general offers to buy the horse back for $50 but Harum decides to keep the horse. The general 'throws in' Swifty, the black groom of the horse played by Stepin Fetchit.

Ann Madison, from an aristocratic family appears. Her family spends summers in Homeville where Harum taught her how to ride and the two have a close, friendly relationship.

Harum sells the balky horse to Deacon Perkins, thus getting his revenge for having been out traded by the Deacon into getting a blind horse earlier.

When John Lennox arrives in town from New York to start working for David, he immediately makes a good impression on both David and Ann Madison.

Ann decides she wants to get Lennox to propose to her, but David explains that a woman in New York rejected him because he was poor. Harum buys back the balking horse from Deacon Perkins, and hitches it to a carriage just so he can suggest that John Lennox will give Ann a ride home from Church, knowing that the horse will balk along the way and give the couple a chance to get better acquainted. Ann is aware of the ruse, which works and the couple make the first tentative steps towards what Ann hopes will be a courtship.

Ann is so grateful to David that she buys the horse from him.

The budding romance is threatened when Lennox thinks Ann was tricked into a bad deal in buying the horse. Ann is offended that he does not realize that she bought the horse out of gratitude for helping along their romance. This rift is not permanent, but there is still the problem that Lennox will not marry a woman if he cannot support her.

Ann discovers that the horse does not balk when he is sung to. At the end of the film, the horse is entered into a harness race, with David Harum riding against Deacon Perkins and his horse. Harum has persuaded Lennox to bet his entire savings on the horse. If it wins, Lennox will have enough money to feel that he can take a wife.

The film reaches a comical conclusion as David and Ann struggle to provide the right singing and music to keep the horse from balking during the race.

The running gag of the film is in all the bargaining, mostly over horses, and mostly between Harum and Deacon Perkins. David's sister does not approve of some of their practices, including what in later times might be called lack of full disclosure. David defends the methods because both parties indulge in the same practices, and both know such practices are to be expected. As David explains to his sister, "You do to the other fella what he'd like to do to you," and "You don't tell everything you know in a horse trade. You let the other fella find out himself." In the movie, it seems to regarded by the participants as a contest of wits as much as anything else, and they make a show of whittling on sticks or inspecting their whips to create an air of nonchalance while they dicker.

For modern audiences, a controversial aspect of the film is the character Sylvester Swifty, the groom for the horse who gets 'thrown in' as part of the deal every time the horse is sold or traded. Swifty is played by black actor Stepin Fetchit and exemplifies the persona which Stepin Fetchit had developed as a listless, shuffling character constantly whining and mumbling under his breath, widely seen as a racist stereotype. Swifty is not stupid however, or superstitious. In one scene he declines to use a rabbit's foot for good luck. During the race at the end, he shows uncharacteristic energy since he has placed a bet himself on the outcome.

== Cast ==
- Will Rogers as David Harum
- Louise Dresser as Polly Harum
- Evelyn Venable as Ann Madison
- Kent Taylor as John Lennox
- Stepin Fetchit as Sylvester Swifty
- Noah Beery, Sr. as Gen. Woolsey
- Roger Imhof as Edwards
- Frank Melton as Caruthers Elwin
- Charles Middleton as Deacon Perkins
- Sarah Padden as Widow Cullon
- Lillian Stuart as Sairy
- Jack Mower as Townsman (uncredited)
- Jane Darwell as General Woolsey's wife (uncredited)
- Ruth Gillette as Lillian Russell (uncredited)
- Spec O' Donnell as Tim (uncredited)
- Charles Coleman as Flowers the Butler (uncredited)
- Lynn Bari as Extra (uncredited)

== Reception ==
The film was one of Fox's biggest hits of the year.
