= Edward Noyes Westcott =

American novelist

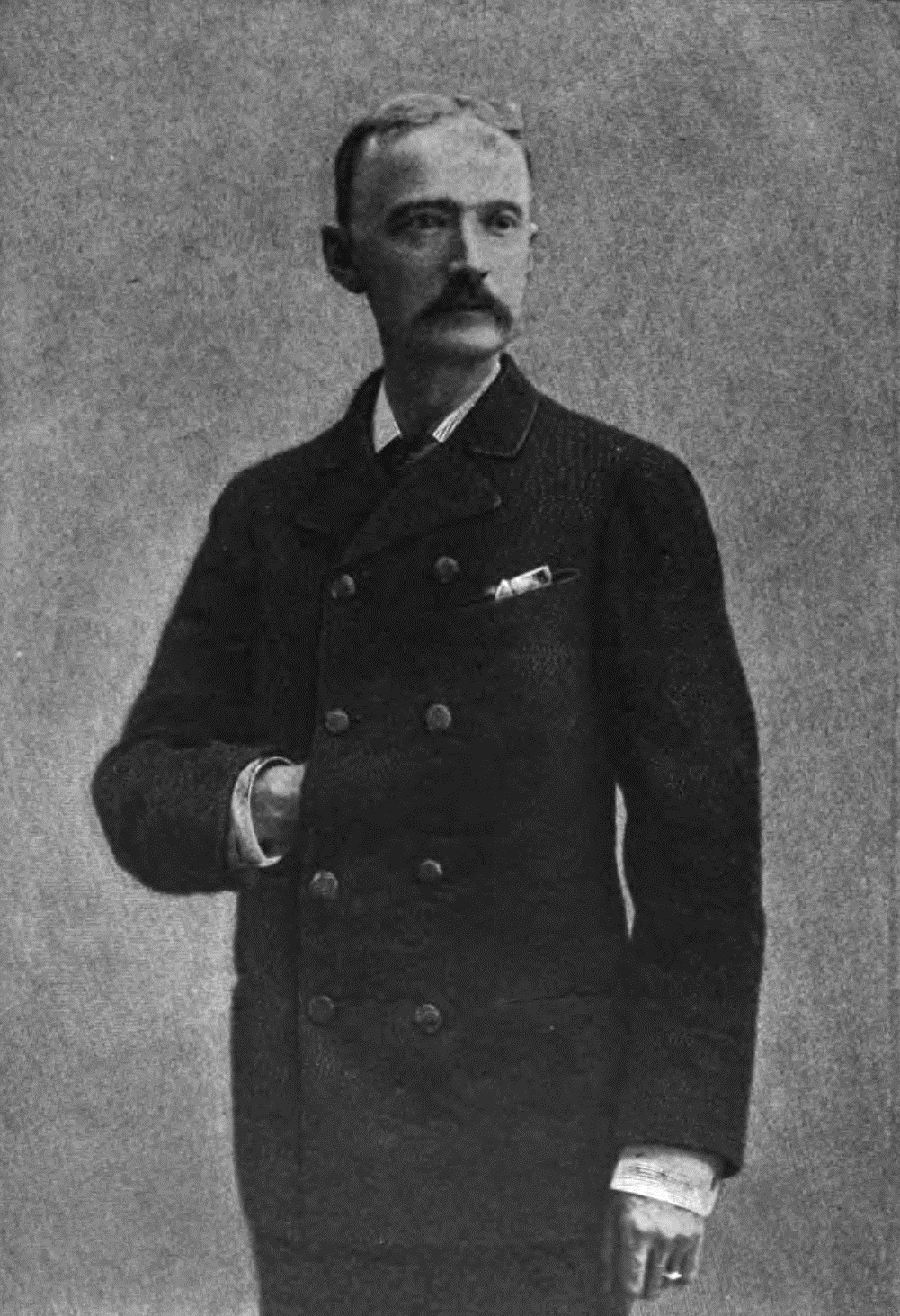
- Born: September 27, 1846; Syracuse, New York, United States
- Died: March 31, 1898 (aged 51); Syracuse
- Occupations: Banker and author
- Known for: Author of David Harum

Edward Noyes Westcott (September 27, 1846 – March 31, 1898) was an American banker and author, best known as the author of David Harum.

== Early life ==
Edward Noyes Westcott was born on September 27, 1846, in Syracuse, New York. His father was professor, dentist, dental college founder, and politician Amos Westcott who served as mayor of Syracuse. Edward's brother Frank Nash Westcott was a minister and author who wrote on Catholicism and two novels.

== Career ==
He was educated a local schools until he turned sixteen and began working in a bank. Westcott remained in that career for the rest of his life.

=== David Harum ===
Westcott began writing David Harum, a novel set in upstate New York, while on leave from his banking career because he was sick with chronic tuberculosis. The book was rejected several times, but in December 1897 reached Ripley Hitchcock, an editor at D. Appleton & Company. Hitchcock edited the book, which was eventually published in September 1898, and became an immediate best-seller. Westcott had died several months earlier.

== Death ==
He died on March 31, 1898, also in Syracuse.
