= Redshirts (Italy) =

Military followers of Giuseppe Garibaldi

- Camicie Rosse; Giubbe Rosse
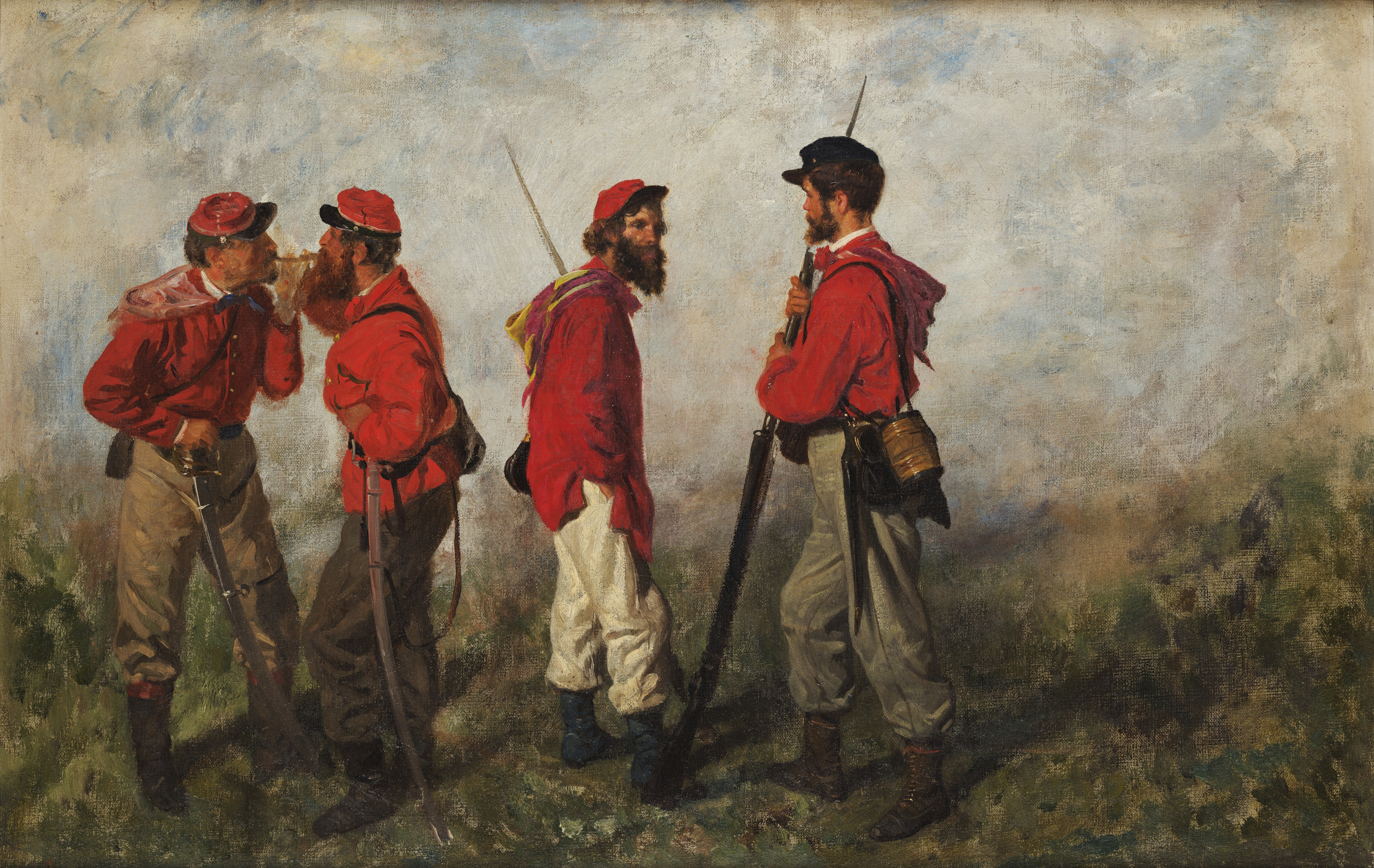
- A group of Garibaldini by Filippo Palizzi, 1860
- Active: 1843–1913
- Country: (Kingdom of Sardinia) Kingdom of Italy
- Allegiance: Kingdom of Sardinia; Colorado Party; Riograndense Republic; Polish National Government; French Third Republic; Kingdom of Greece
- Type: Infantry
- Nickname: Garibaldini
- Engagements: Uruguayan Civil War; Wars of Italian Unification; Second Italian War of Independence; Expedition of the Thousand; Battle of Calatafimi; Siege of Palermo; Battle of Aspromonte; Third Italian War of Independence; Battle of Bezzecca; Battle of Mentana; Ragamuffin War; January Uprising; Great Cretan Revolution; Franco-Prussian War; Battle of Dijon; Greco-Turkish War (1897); Battle of Domokos; Balkan Wars; First Balkan War; Battle of Driskos

Commanders
- Notable commanders: Giuseppe Garibaldi; Menotti Garibaldi; Ricciotti Garibaldi

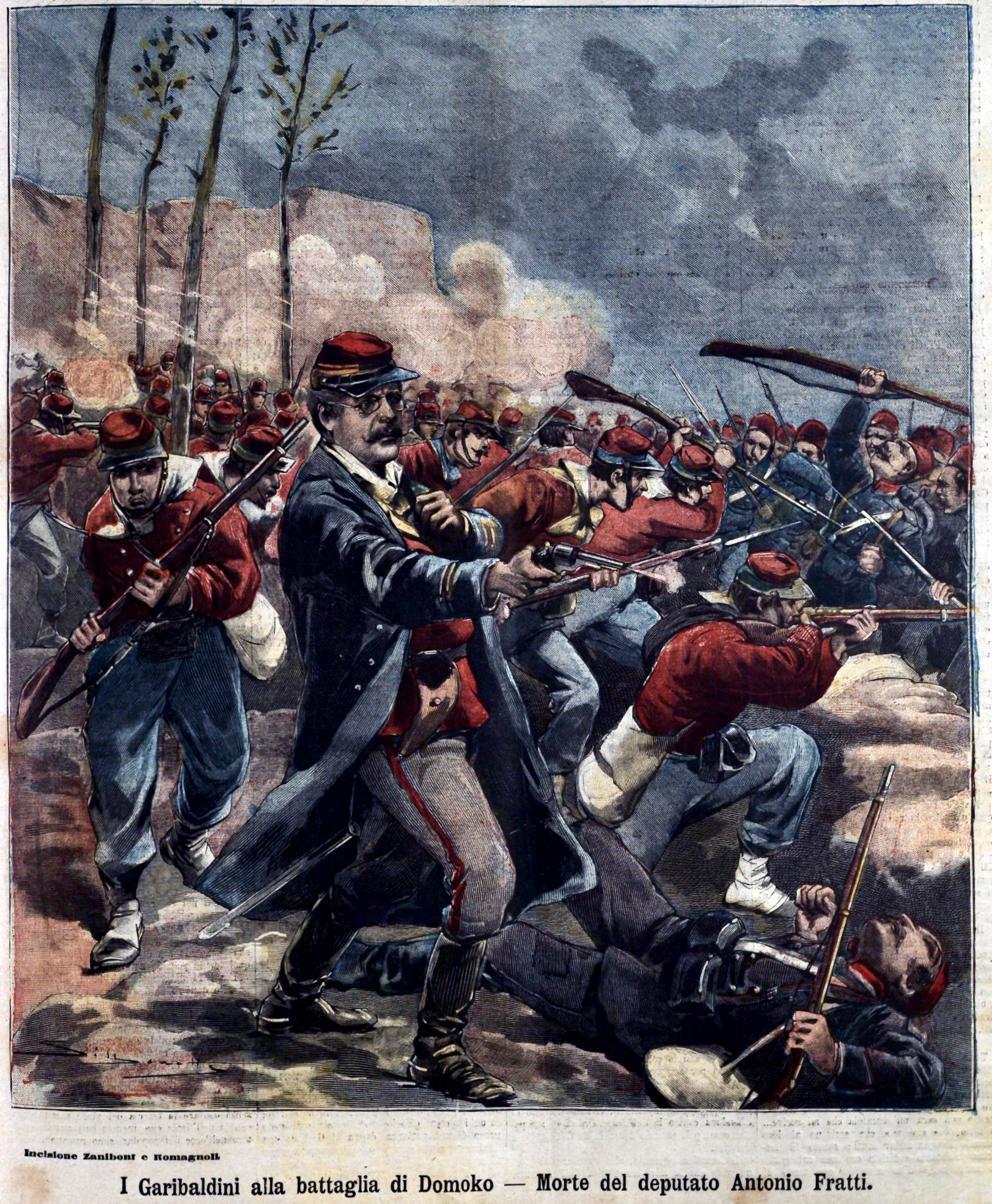
Redshirts at the Battle of Domokos

The Redshirts (Italian: Camicie rosse or Giubbe rosse), also called the Red Coats, were volunteers who followed the Italian patriot Giuseppe Garibaldi during his campaigns. The name derived from the colour of their shirts or loose-fitting blouses that the volunteers, usually called Garibaldini, wore in lieu of a uniform.

The force originated as the Italian Legion supporting the Colorado Party during the Uruguayan Civil War. The story is that Garibaldi was given red shirts destined for slaughterhouse workers. Later, during the wars of Italian unification, the Redshirts won several battles against the armies of the Austrian Empire, the Kingdom of Two Sicilies and the Papal States. Most notably, Garibaldi led his Redshirts in the Expedition of the Thousand of 1860, which concluded with the annexation of Sicily, Southern Italy, Marche, and Umbria to the Kingdom of Sardinia, which led to the creation of a unified Kingdom of Italy. His military enterprises in South America and Europe made Garibaldi become known as the "Hero of the Two Worlds".

Redshirts and Garibaldino were used to describe Italian volunteers in subsequent international conflicts, including the Garibaldi Legion of Poland organized by Garibaldi's son Menotti during the January Uprising (1863); the Redshirt volunteers led by Garibaldi's son Ricciotti that fought with the army of Greece during the Greco-Turkish War (1897) and the Balkan League during the First Balkan War (1912–1913); the Garibaldi Legion who fought for France in World War I (1914–1915); the Garibaldi Battalion who fought for the Republicans in the Spanish Civil War; and the Italian anti-fascist partisans in World War II.

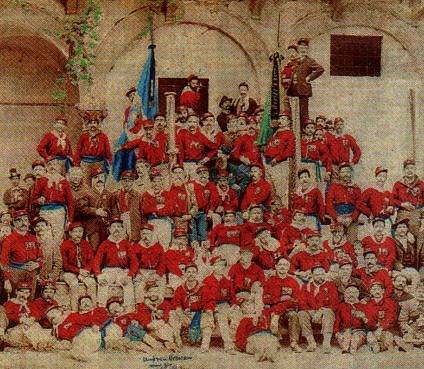
Redshirt volunteers from Brescia during the Expedition of the Thousand (1860)

The Redshirts were very popular and influenced many armies worldwide. For example, during the American Civil War, the Union's Garibaldi Guard and its Confederate counterpart, the Garibaldi Legion, wore red shirts as a part of their uniforms. The Garibaldi shirt also became a popular type of clothing. According to A Cultural History of the Modern Age: The Crisis of the European Soul, "for a considerable time Garibaldi was the most famous man in Europe, and the red shirt, la camicia rossa, became the fashion for ladies, even outside Italy".

== Background ==
The red shirts were started by Giuseppe Garibaldi. During his years of exile, Garibaldi was involved in a military action in Uruguay. In 1843, he originally used red shirts from a stock destined for slaughterhouse workers in Buenos Aires. Later, he spent time in private retirement in New York City. Both places have been claimed as the birthplace of the Garibaldian red shirt.

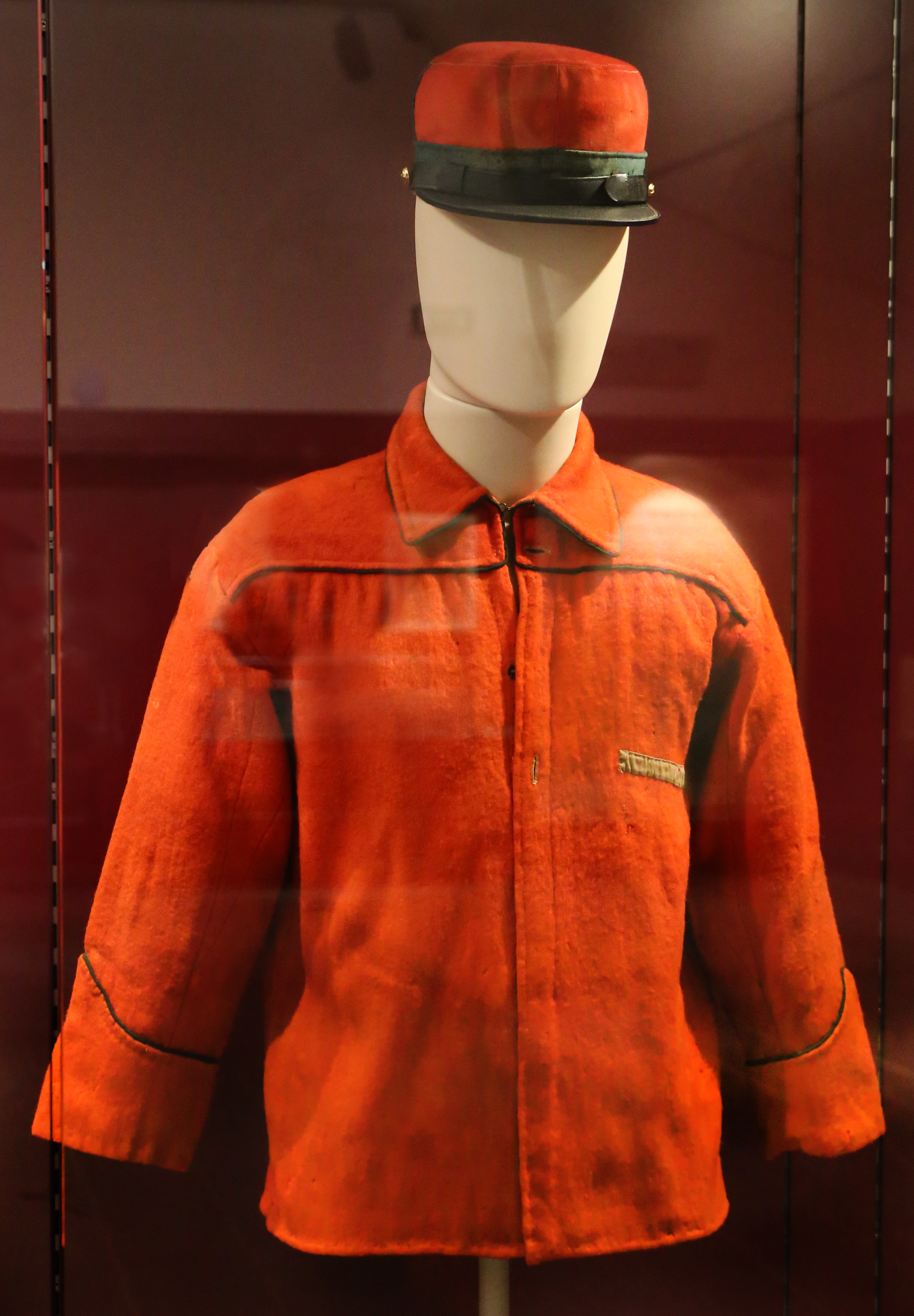
A typical red shirt and cap of a Garibaldino in Livorno (on display at the Museo della città, Livorno)

The formation of his force of volunteers in Uruguay, his mastery of the techniques of guerilla warfare, his opposition to the Emperor of Brazil and to Argentine territorial ambitions (perceived by liberals as also imperialist), and his victories in the Battles of Cerro and Sant'Antonio in 1846 assured the independence of Uruguay and made Garibaldi and his followers heroes in Italy and Europe. Garibaldi was later hailed as the "Gran Chico Fornido" on the basis of these exploits.

In Uruguay, Garibaldi called on the Italians of Montevideo and formed the Italian Legion in 1843. In later years, it was claimed that in Uruguay the legion first sported the red shirts associated with Garibaldi's "Thousand", which were said to have been obtained from a factory in Montevideo that had intended to export them to the slaughterhouses of Argentina. Red shirts sported by Argentinian butchers in the 1840s are not otherwise documented, however, and the famous camicie rosse did not appear during Garibaldi's efforts in Rome in 1849–1850. Later, after the failure of the campaign for Rome, Garibaldi spent around 1850– to 1853 with the Italian patriot and inventor, Antonio Meucci, in a modest Gothic frame house (now designated a New York City Landmark), on Staten Island, New York City before he sailed for Italy in 1853. The Garibaldi-Meucci Museum is on Staten Island

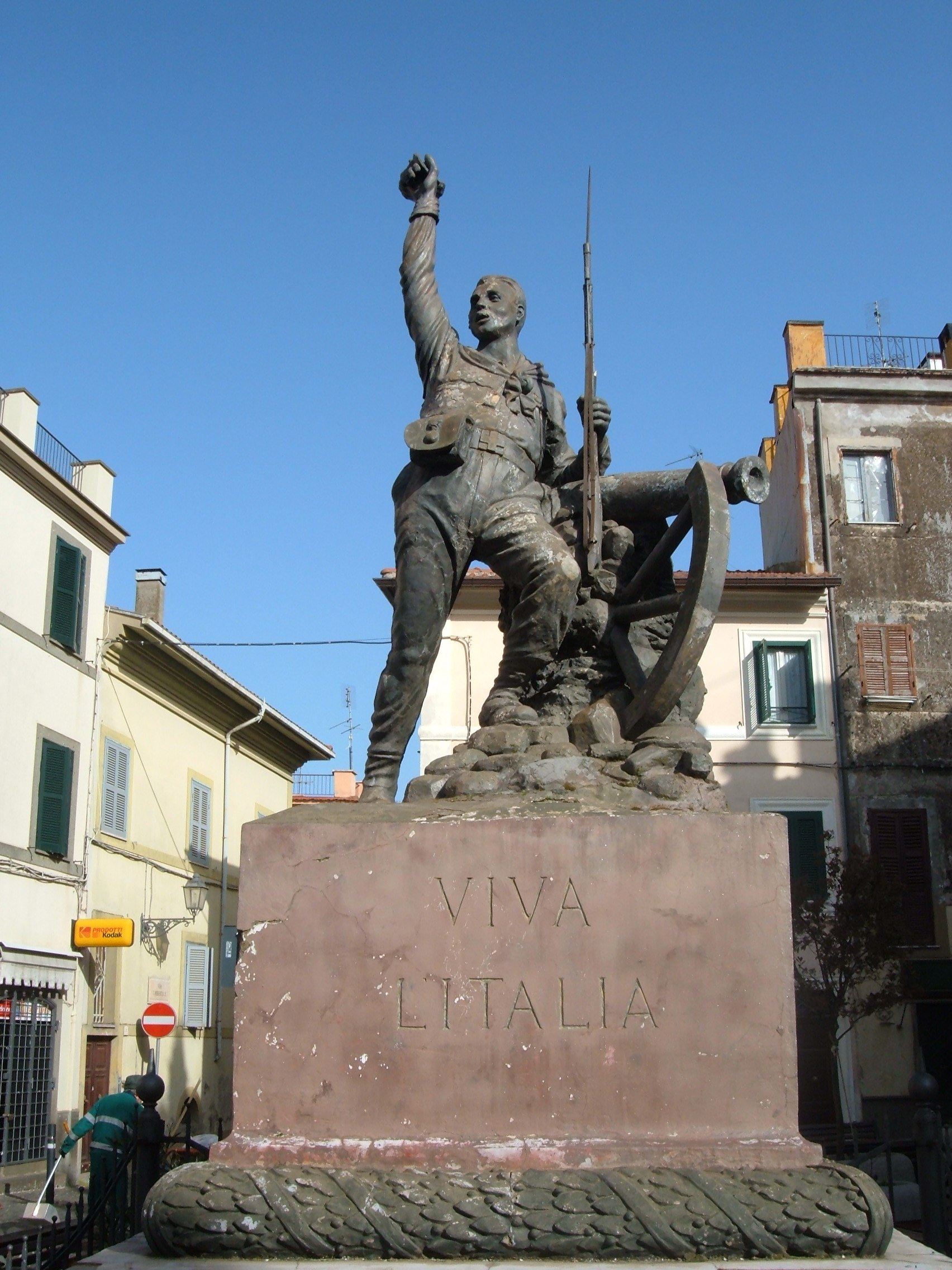
A typical patriotic communal monument to the Garibaldini, at Monte Porzio

Garibaldi remained a local hero among European immigrants back in the city. The "Garibaldi Guard" (39th New York State Volunteers) fought in the American Civil War from 1861 to 1865. As part of their uniform, all enlisted men wore red woollen "Garibaldi Shirts". The New York Tribune sized them up:

The officers of the Guard are men who have held important commands in the Hungarian, Italian, and German revolutionary armies. Many of them were in the Sardinian and French armies in the Crimea and in Algeria.

A woman's fashion, the Garibaldi shirt, was begun in 1860 by Empress Eugénie in France, and the blousy style remained popular for some years and eventually turned into the Victorian shirt waist and modern woman's blouse. Garibaldi's son, Ricciotti Garibaldi, later led Redshirt volunteer troops that fought with the Hellenic Army in the Greco-Turkish War in 1897 and the First Balkan War in 1912–13.

== Legacy ==
The Redshirts gave inspiration to Benito Mussolini when he formed the Italian fascist Blackshirts (MVSN) units. That gave inspiration to Adolf Hitler's units of Brownshirts, the Sturmabteilung (SA) and the quasi-fascist Irish Blueshirts, led by Eoin O'Duffy. Although they were vaguely nationalistic in tone, Garibaldi and his men were not proto-fascist but radical liberals of the era, supporting independentists in the Americas and Europe. Nottingham Forest have worn red shirts since the club's formation in 1865, as tribute to the Garibaldi Redshirts and their leader.

In Ferenc Molnár's 1906 youth novel The Paul Street Boys one of the rivaling group of children are called the redshirts and their leader, Áts Feri is described as "Garibaldiesque" at one point.

== Gallery ==
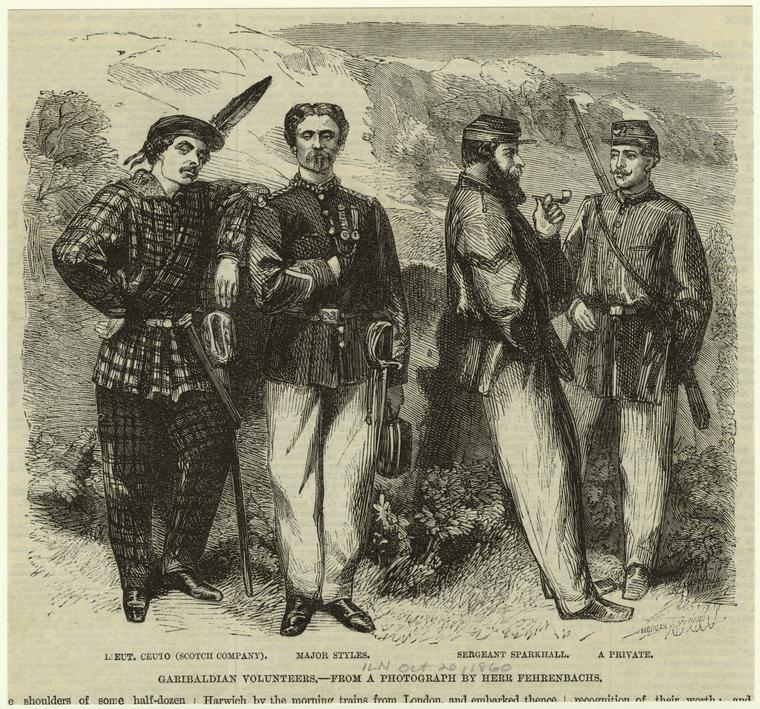
Garibaldian volunteers of the British Legion

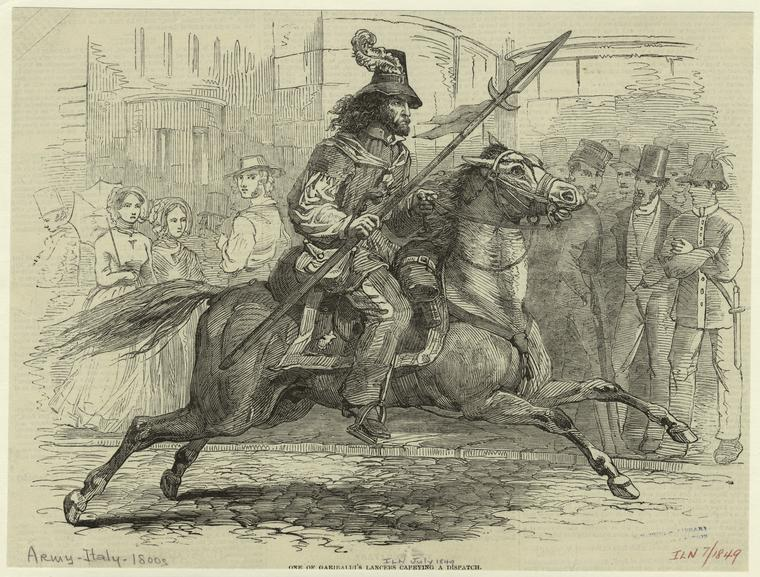
One of Garibaldi's lancers carrying a dispatch

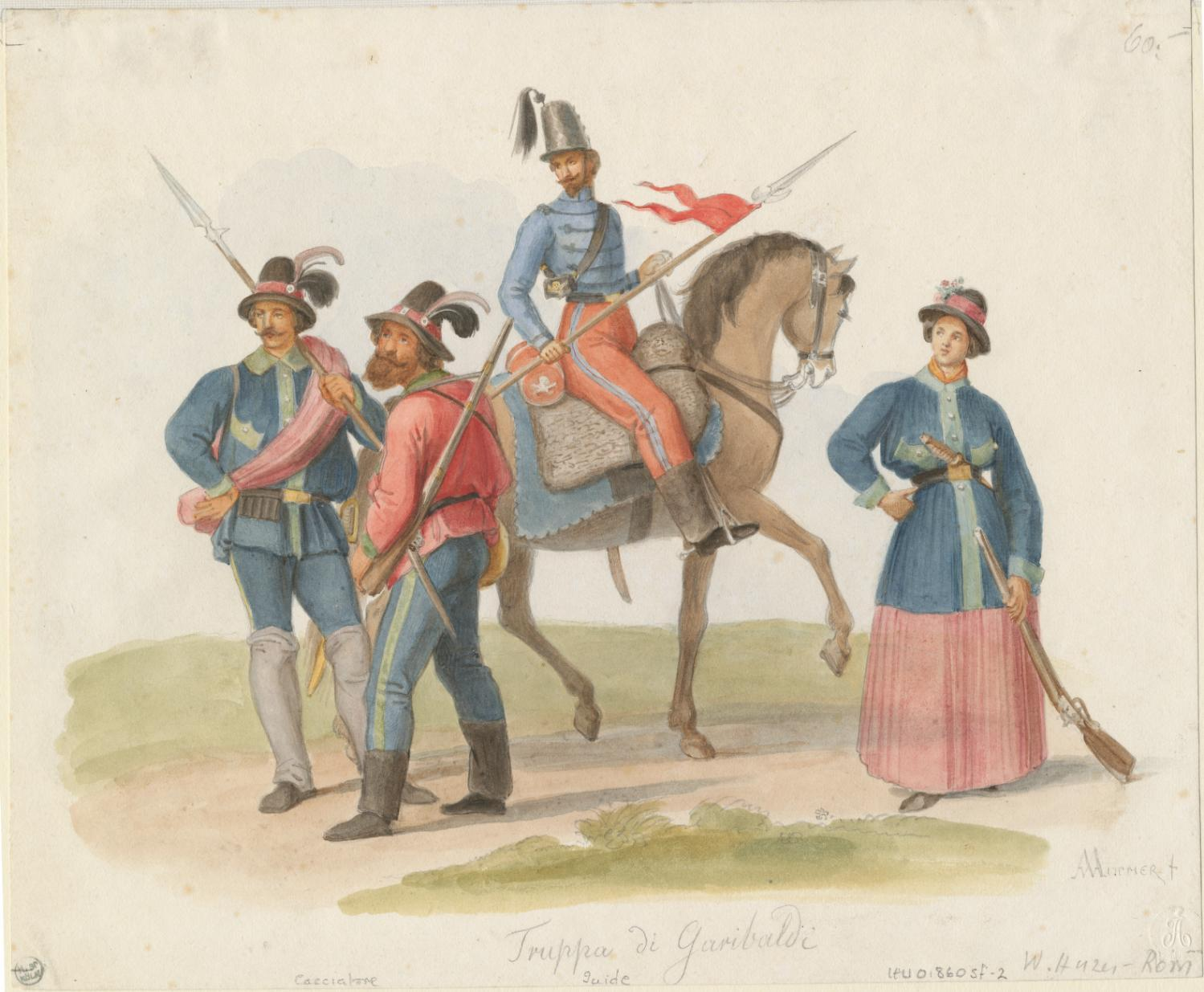
Truppa di Garibaldi

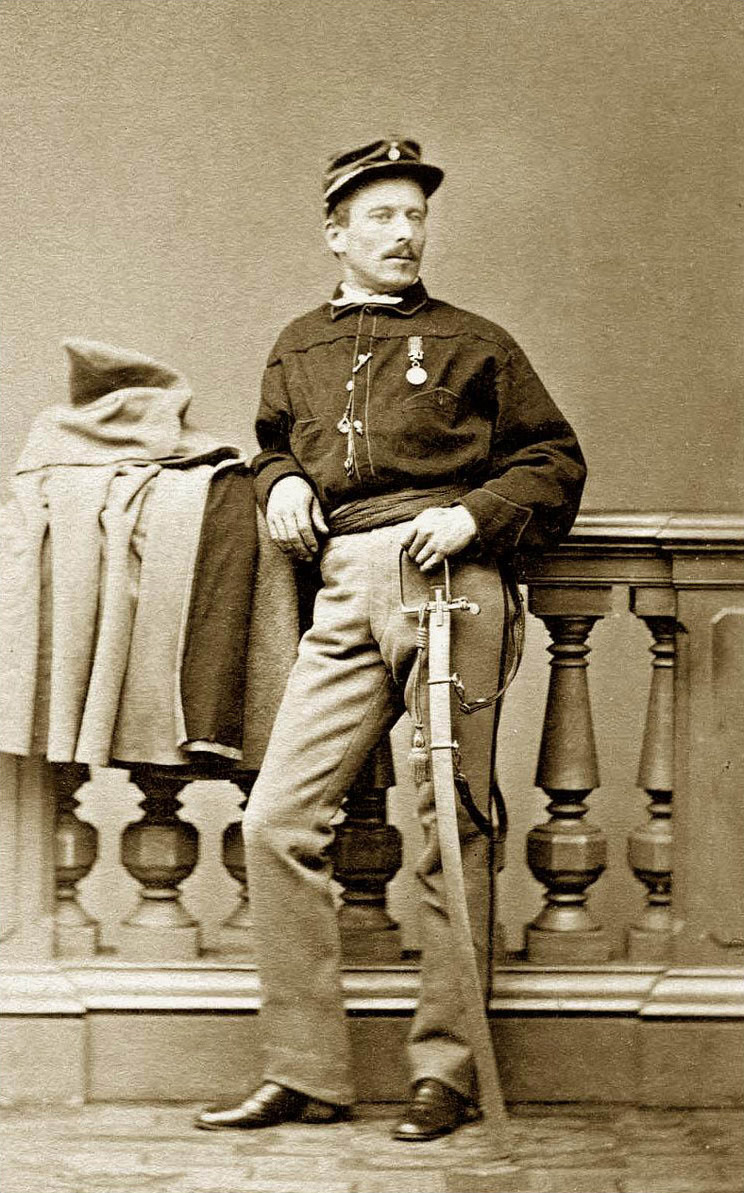
Giuseppe Barboglio a Red Shirt volunteer of the Thousand wearing the Marsala Medal

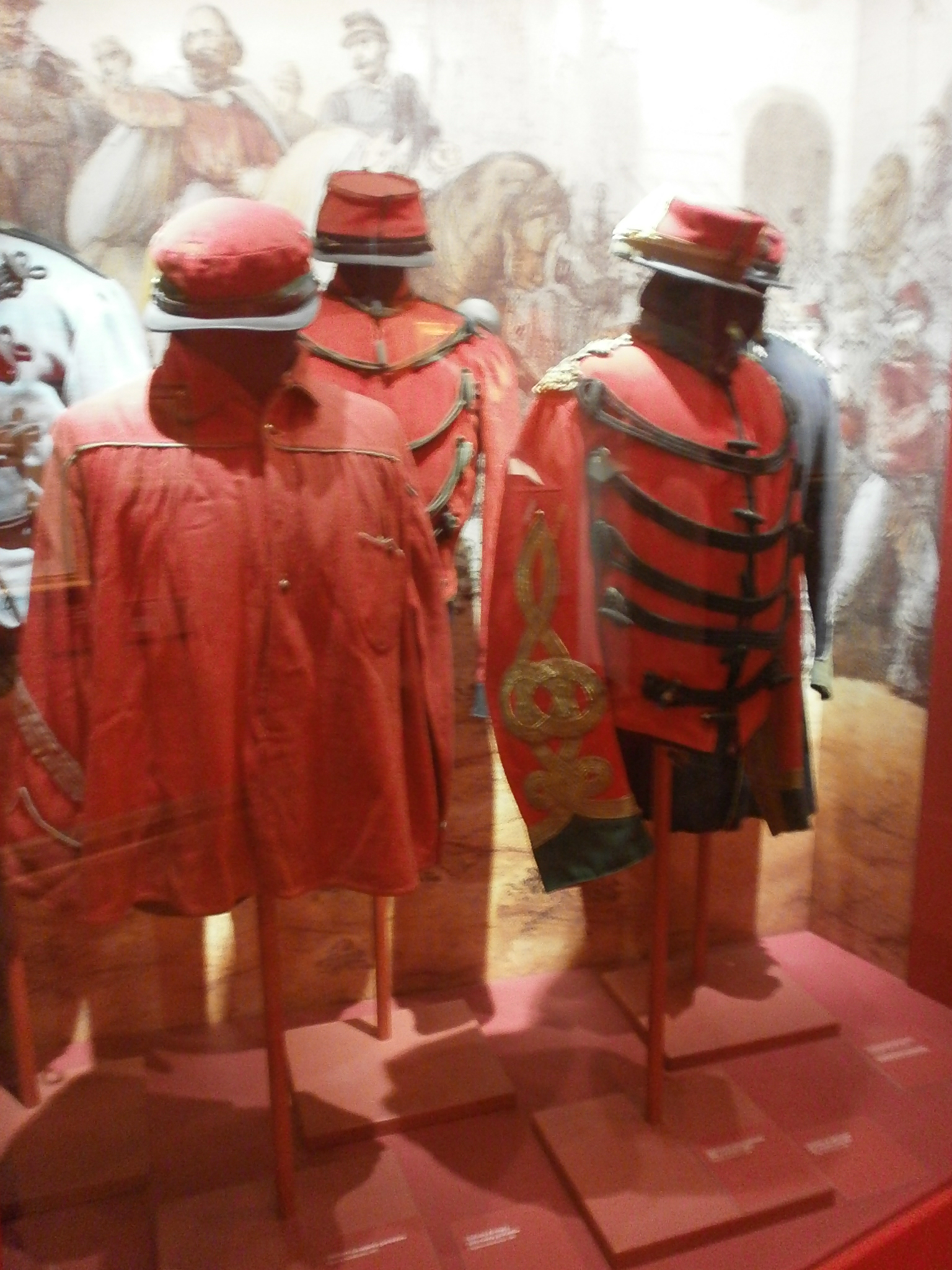
Uniforms of the garibaldines at the Museum of the Risorgimento, Milan

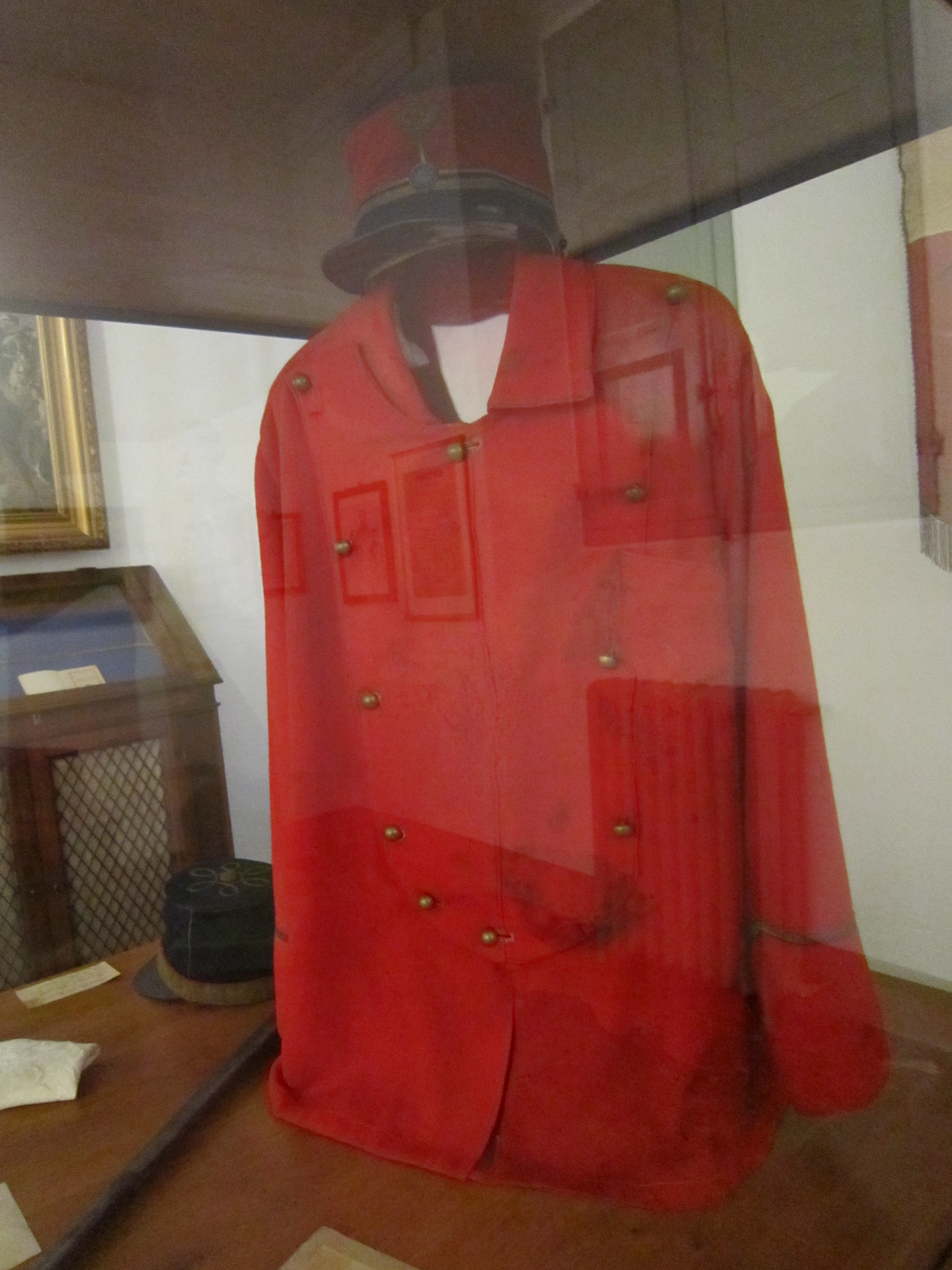
Red uniform of the Italian politician, Antonio Fratti, killed in the Greco-Turkish War of 1897

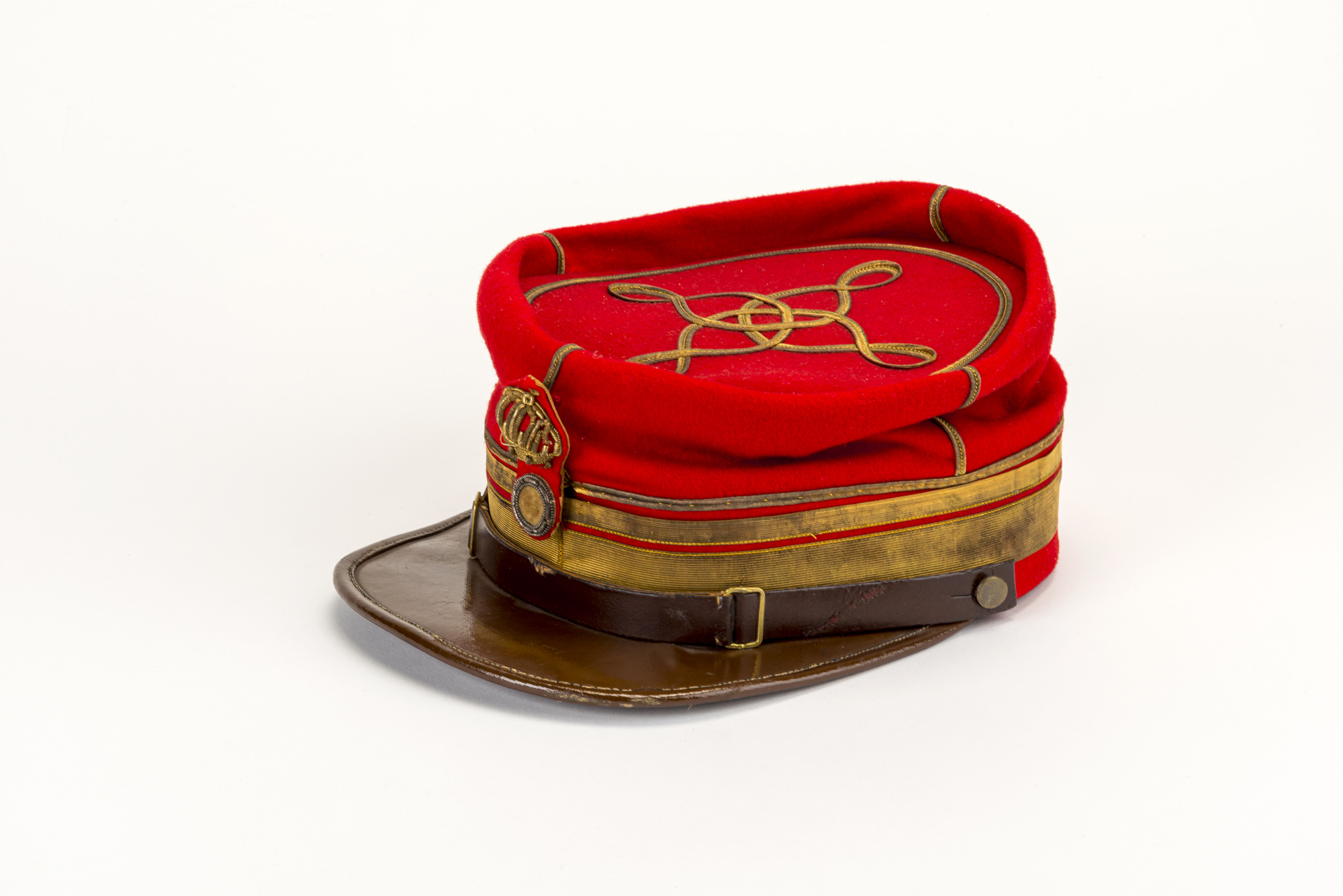
A Redshirt's cap at the Athens War Museum

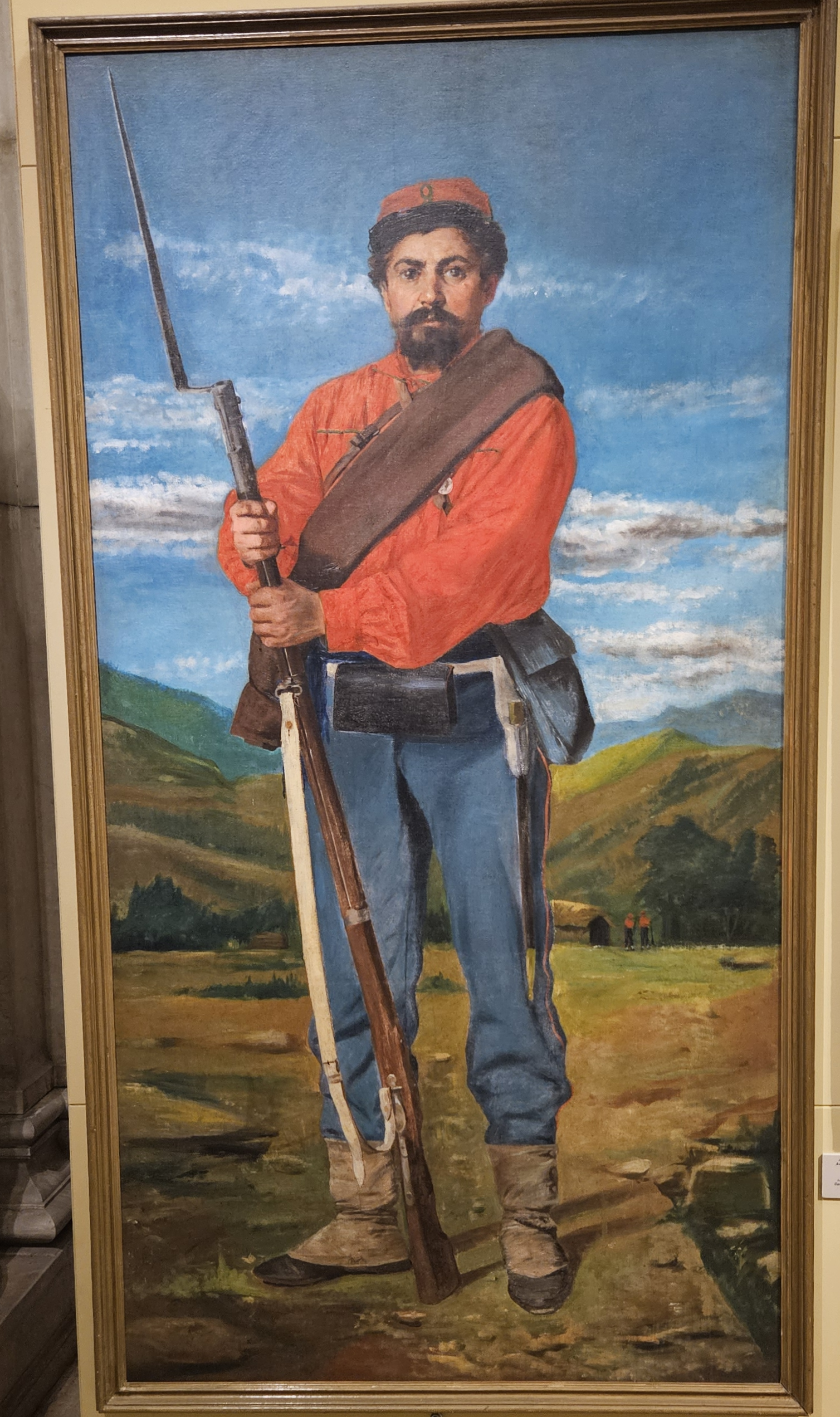
Garibaldi troop outpost in Valcamonica by Annibale Gatti (1859), at the Museo Centrale del Risorgimento.
