= Kitty Foyle =

Kitty Foyle may refer to:

== In arts and entertainment ==
- Kitty Foyle (novel), by Christopher Morley
- Kitty Foyle (film), a 1940 film starring Ginger Rogers
- Kitty Foyle (radio and TV series), an American radio and television soap opera
- Kitty Foiled, an animated Tom and Jerry cartoon short

== Other uses ==
- Kitty Foyle (dress), a dress style of the 1940s
