= Garibaldi Legion =

Garibaldi Legion is a name associated with several military units, usually with Italian origins, and may refer to:

- 6th Regiment, European Brigade, commonly named Garibaldi Legion, a Confederate unit during the American Civil War
- Garibaldi Legion (Poland), a Polish unit during the January Uprising
- Garibaldi Legion (French Foreign Legion), a French unit during World War I

== See also ==
- Garibaldi Guard
- Garibaldi Battalion
- Brigate Garibaldi
