= Garibaldi shirt =

Red wool shirt worn by followers of Giuseppe Garibaldi

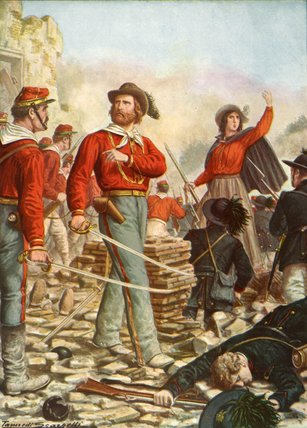
Giuseppe Garibaldi (center), the Italian patriot, and his wife, Anita (right), wore red Garibaldi shirts, a type of military blouse, which transitioned into early 1860s unisex civilian fashion in Europe and the United States.

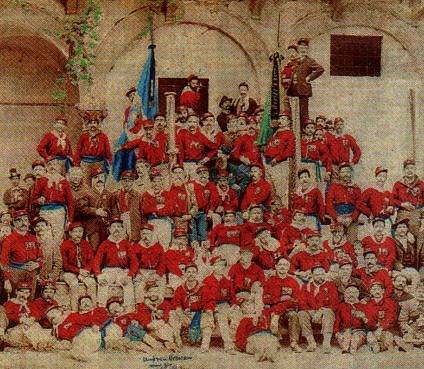
Giuseppe Garibaldi's soldiers, wearing the distinctive, red, uniform, Garibaldi shirt, during the 1860 "Expedition of the Thousand", in Sicily

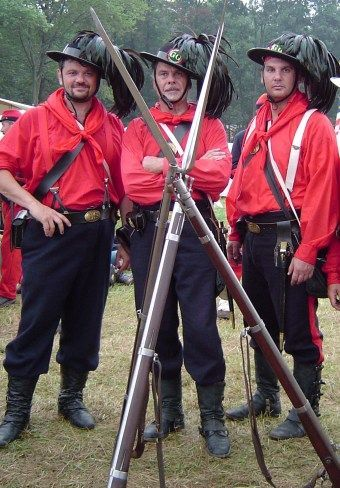
Living historians portraying the Garibaldi Guard

In 1860, the Empress Eugénie de Montijo of France introduced the Garibaldi blouse as popular women's fashion. Woman in white, Garibaldi blouse, photograph, circa 1860–1865.

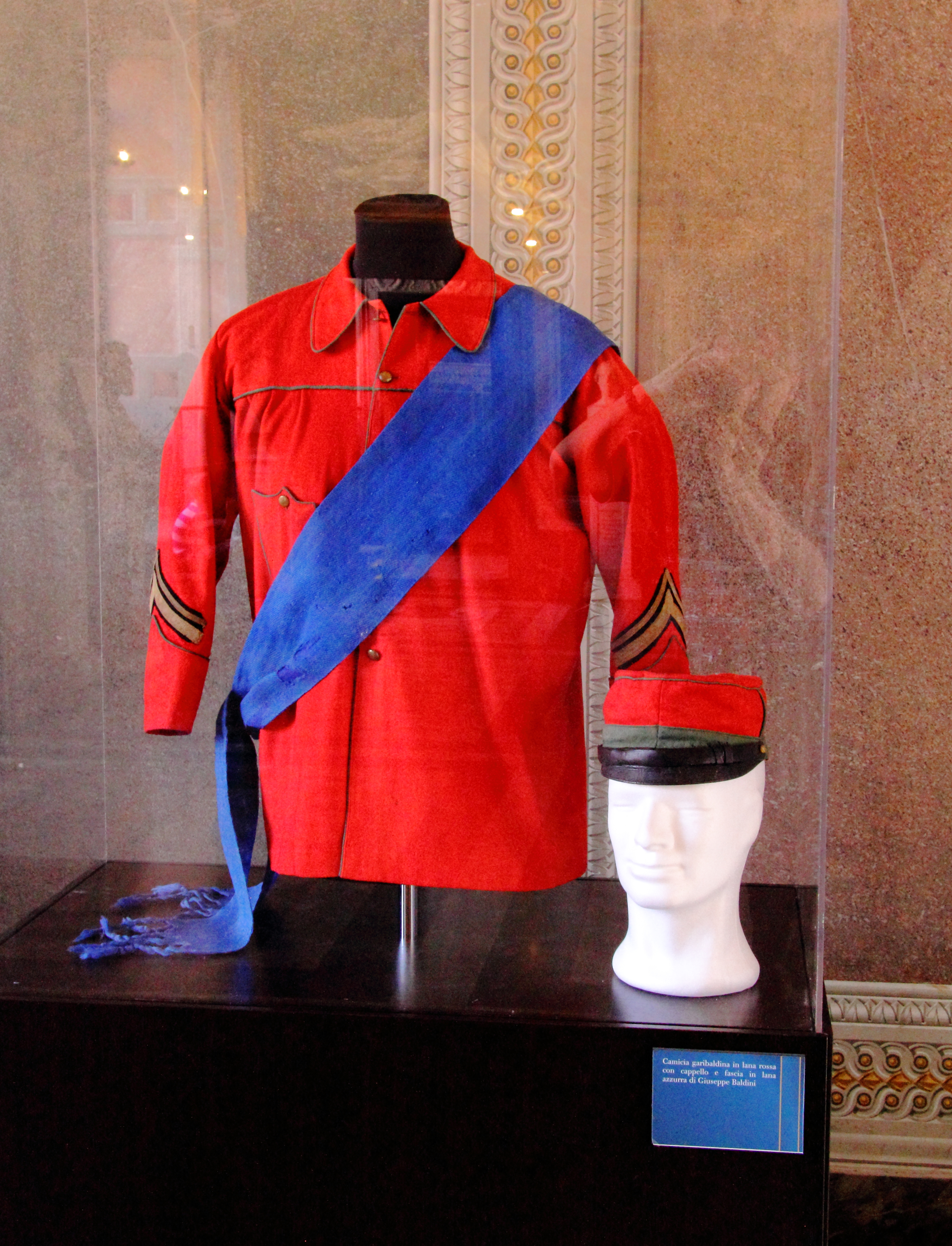
Garibaldi shirt and cap exhibited in the Siena town hall

A Garibaldi shirt, also called Garibaldi jacket or Camicia rossa, was an article of women's, a red wool shirt named after the Italian patriot Giuseppe Garibaldi first popularized in 1860. It was the direct ancestor of the modern women's blouse. (Note: Young, p. 355)

== Garibaldi's Redshirts ==
Giuseppe Garibaldi (1807–1882) was an Italian folk hero, a nationalist in favor of Italian independence from Austria. Garibaldi's "total sincerity and honesty, and exceptional physical courage gave him the kind of personal magnetism which made women of all classes love him, and men of all classes follow him in circumstances of acute danger." (Note: Hearder, p. 188) During the Expedition of the Thousand campaign in 1860, his volunteer followers were known as Redshirts (Camicie Rosse in Italian) for their uniforms (or rather shirts, as they could not afford full uniforms), and it is these who inspired the fashion.

== Garibaldi shirt ==
According to a brief history of the shirt waist written in 1902, the fashion for the Garibaldi shirt was initiated by Empress Eugénie of France. (Note: Young, p. 357) Its first mention is in 1860, and clothing historian C. Willett Cunnington says of it: "The Garibaldi jacket, of scarlet cashmere with military trimmings of gold braid, was hailed as 'the gem of the season'." (Note: Cunnington, p. 208) It was extremely popular during the first half of the 1860s. Versions in white and lighter fabrics also appeared, (Note: Buck, p. 32) and children frequently wore it. (Note: Buck, p. 213)

== Camicia rossa ==
The century Illustrated Monthly Magazine, Volume 74 explains that the "Camicia rossa" or red shirt was "...worn by Garibaldi at [a] siege". A Cultural History of the Modern Age: The Crisis of the European Soul says that "For a considerable time Garibaldi was the most famous man in Europe, and the red shirt, la camicia rossa, became the fashion for ladies, even outside Italy"

== Italians during the American Civil War ==
During the American Civil War, the Garibaldi Guard, composed of European immigrants, from New York City, served in the Union Army, wearing red Garibaldi shirts as a part of their uniforms. Their Confederate counterpart, the mainly Italian Garibaldi Legion, were also known for wearing red Garibaldi shirts and cocked hats with plumes in the Italian national colors as a part of their uniforms.

== Late and post-Victorian women's fashion ==
The Garibaldi shirt was popularized in 1860. The style was worn exclusively by women and remained popular for some years, eventually turning into the Victorian shirt waist and modern woman's blouse.

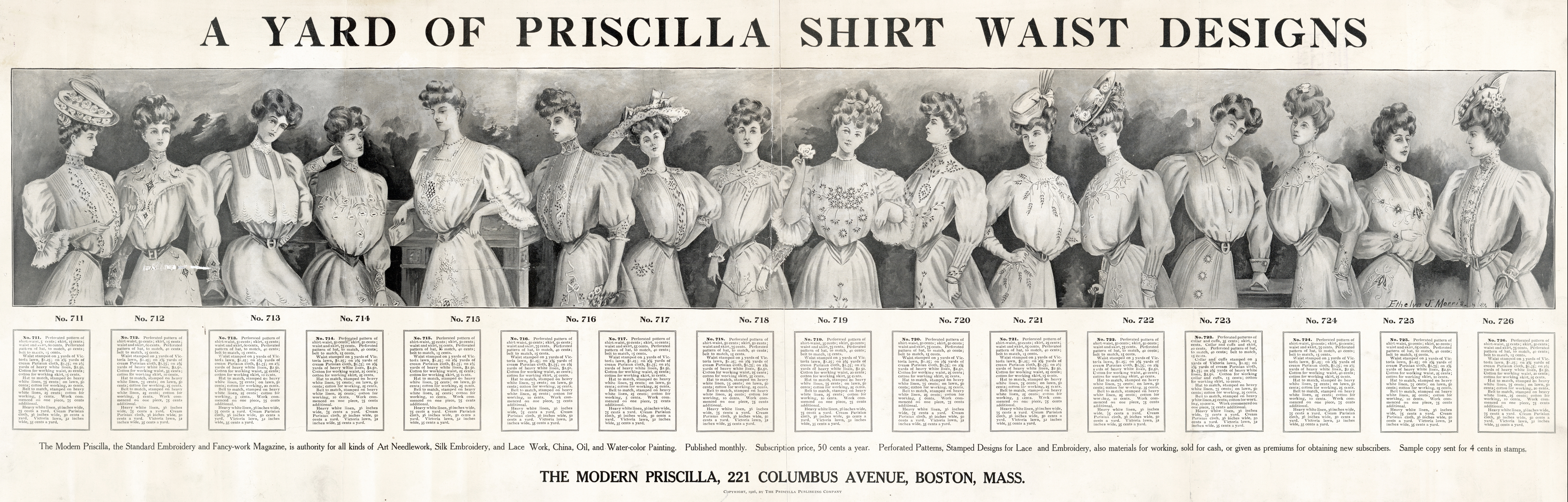
The baggy, bloused style, of the Garibaldi shirt, heavily influenced the Late and post-Victorian fashions, as seen in a 1906 advertisement, in The Modern Priscilla, a needlework magazine, showing 16 different designs for shirtwaists, with details, about patterns and materials.

== See also ==
- Zouave jacket, another military-inspired fashion of the same era
