= Renié =

American costume designer (1901–1992)

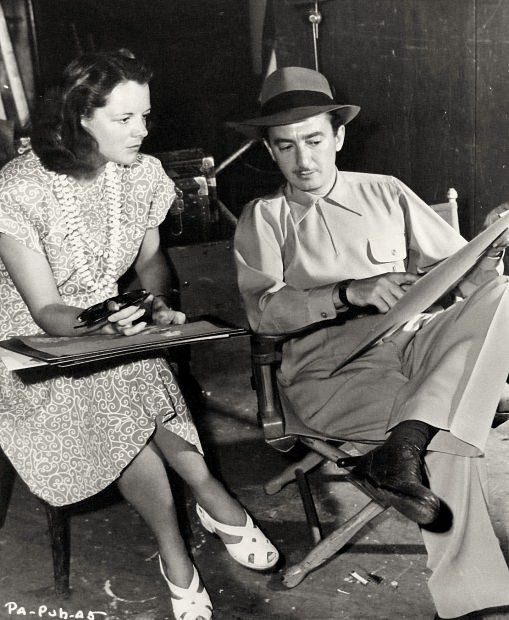
Renié and director John H. Auer on the set of Pan-Americana (1945)

Renié Conley (July 31, 1901 − June 12, 1992), professionally called simply Renié, was a prominent Hollywood costume designer.

== Biography ==
Born Irene Brouillet in Republic, Washington, Renié studied at Chouinard Art Institute and the University of California in Los Angeles. For over three decades, she was noted for clothing the stars in subtle, elegant outfits, such as the eponymous dresses that Ginger Rogers wore as the glamorous all-American working girl in Kitty Foyle (1940).

She got her start designing theatre sets and then began working as a sketch artist for Paramount Pictures. In 1937, she became a costume designer for RKO Pictures. She remained with the studio, attiring its biggest stars, until the 1950s, when she started freelancing. In 1963, Renié's costumes for the epic Cleopatra earned her an Oscar for costume design and four other nominations. She also designed the costumes for the 1942 film A Date with the Falcon and the 1943 The Falcon and the Co-eds. In addition to films, Renié's work can be seen on such television series as Haywire (1990 - 1991). For a while, she also designed costumes for Shipstead & Johnson's Ice Follies.

Renié was an adherent of the Church of Christ, Scientist, who contended that her faith enabled her to overcome worldly ambition, putting her work on an unselfish and solid foundation.

She died at the age of 91 years in Los Angeles County, California.

== Accolades ==
Association	Year	Category	Title	Result	Notes	Ref.
Academy Awards	1952	Best Costume Design, Black-and-White	The Model and the Marriage Broker	Nominated	Shared with Charles LeMaire	
Academy Awards	1954	Best Costume Design, Black-and-White	The President's Lady	Nominated	Shared with Charles LeMaire	
Academy Awards	1960	Best Costume Design, Color	The Big Fisherman	Nominated		
Academy Awards	1964	Best Costume Design, Color	Cleopatra	Won	Shared with Irene Sharaff and Vittorio Nino Novarese	
Academy Awards	1979	Best Costume Design	Caravans	Nominated		
Costume Designers Guild Awards	2006	Hall of Fame	—N/a	Honored		
