= Foyle =

Foyle may refer to:

- The River Foyle in Ireland
  - Lough Foyle, an estuary of the River Foyle

== Entities named for the River Foyle ==
- BBC Radio Foyle, local radio station
- Foyle (Assembly constituency)
- Foyle (Northern Ireland Parliament constituency)
- Foyle (UK Parliament constituency)
- Foyle and Londonderry College, a grammar school in Derry
- Foyle Film Festival
- Foyle Metro, the Derry-based bus operator

== Arts and entertainment ==
- Kitty Foyle (film), a 1940 film
- Detective Chief Superintendent Christopher Foyle, the protagonist of the TV series Foyle's War
- Foyle, a partner of Bonehead in the film Detectives on the Edge of a Nervous Breakdown

== Other uses ==
- Foyle (surname), a list of notable people with this surname
- Foyles, a bookshop in London
- HMS Foyle (T48), a Mersey Class trawler built for the Royal Navy
