= Foyle (surname) =

Foyle is a surname. It may refer to:

- Adonal Foyle (born 1975), Vincentian-American basketball player
- Ashley Foyle (born 1986), English footballer
- Charles Henry Foyle (1878–1948), English businessperson; inventor of the folding carton
- Christina Foyle (1911–1999), English bookseller
- Jonathan Foyle (born ?), English architectural historian and television broadcaster
- Kevin Foyle (born 1962), English cricketer
- Martin Foyle (born 1963), English footballer and manager
- Mike Foyle (born 1985), British music composer and producer
- Neil Foyle (born 1991), Irish hurler
- Órfhlaith Foyle (born ?), Irish writer and poet
- William Foyle (1885–1963), British bookseller

== In fiction ==
- Anthony "Tony" Foyle, Viscount Gillingham, a character in Downton Abbey
- Christopher Foyle, protagonist of the British television detective series Foyle's War
- Gully Foyle, protagonist of The Stars My Destination by Alfred Bester
- Kitty Foyle (disambiguation)

== See also ==
- Foyle (disambiguation)
