= Blouse =

Garment for the upper body

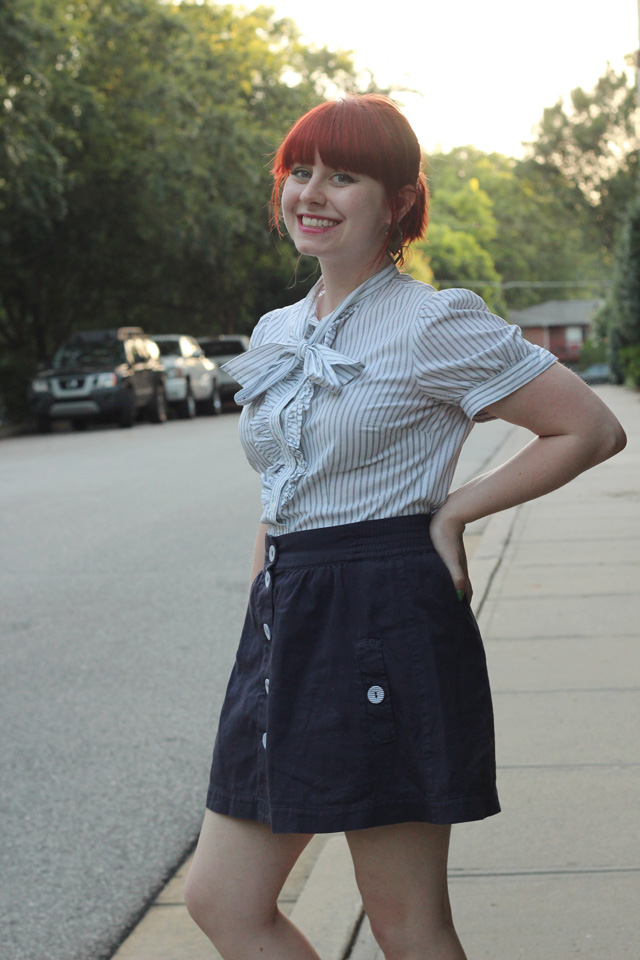
A modern striped bow tie neck blouse and a navy blue mini skirt

A blouse (/blaʊz, blaʊs, bluːz/) is a loose-fitting upper garment, mainly worn by workmen, peasants, artists, women, and children. It is typically gathered at the waist or hips (by tight hem, pleats, parter, or belt) so that it hangs loosely ("blouses") over the wearer's body. Today, the word most commonly refers to a girl's or woman's dress shirt, although there is considerable confusion between a true blouse and a women's shirt. It can also refer to a man's shirt if it is a loose-fitting style (e.g. poet shirts and Cossack shirts), though it rarely is. Traditionally, the term has been used to refer to a shirt which blouses out or (alternatively) has an unmistakably feminine appearance; in contemporary fashion, standard dress shirts of both genders commonly come in such a loose fit without being considered "blouses".

The term is also used for some men's military uniform jackets.

== Etymology ==
Blouse is a loanword from French to English (see Wiktionary entry blouse). Originally referring to the blue blouse worn by French workmen, the term "blouse" began to be applied to the various smocks and tunics worn by English farm labourers. In 1870, "blouse" was first referenced as being "for a young lady."

It is suggested that the French form of the word comes from the Latin pelusia, from the Egyptian town of Pelusium, a manufacturing center in the Middle Ages, or alternatively from Provençal (lano) blouso 'short (wool)'.

== Description ==
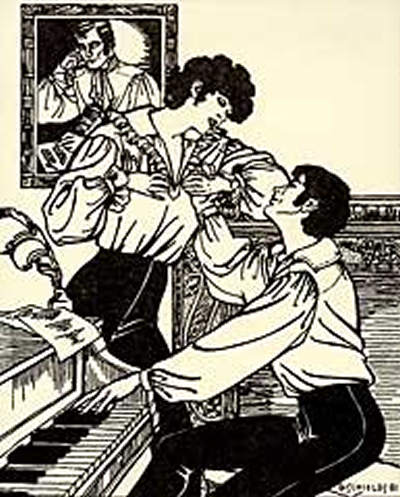
A man and woman wearing poet shirts—a unisex blouse, inspired by Romanticism and worn by fashionable people such as the English poet, Lord Byron

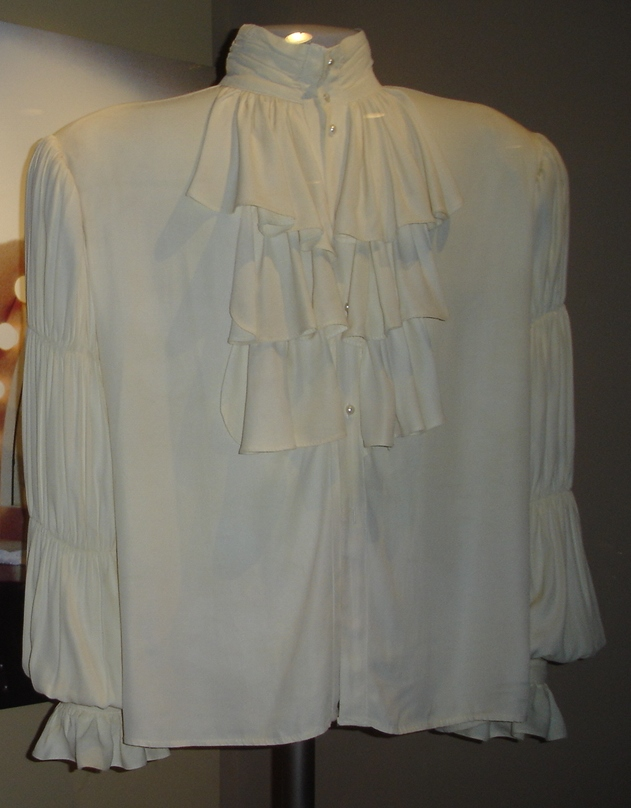
The Seinfeld "puffy shirt", worn by Jerry Seinfeld, is an example of a poet shirt blouse.

Blouses usually consist of light fabrics such as silk or thin cotton fabrics, and until the early 1990s were often made of softly falling synthetic fibers (e.g. polyester). Sometimes they are decorated with frills, embroidery or lace trim. Traditionally, the white shirt or shirtwaist, which follows in appearance the elegant men's dress shirt, is considered the most classic variant among ladies' shirts/blouses. Modifications may include alternate collar types (like peter pan, etc.), sleeve lengths, or fit.

Blouses are often made of cotton or silk cloth and may include a collar and sleeves. They are generally more tailored than simple knit tops, and may contain details such as ruffles, a tie or a soft bow at the neck, or embroidered decorations.

Tailoring provides a closer fit to the wearer's shape. This is achieved with sewing of features such as princess seams or darting in the waist and/or bust.

Blouses (and many women's shirts with buttons) usually have buttons reversed from that of men's shirts (except in the case of male military fatigues). That is, the buttons are normally on the wearer's left-hand and the buttonholes are on the right. The reasons for this are unclear, and several theories exist without having conclusive evidence. Some suggest this custom was introduced by launderers so they could distinguish between women's and men's shirts. One theory purports that the tradition arose in the Middle Ages when one manner of manifesting wealth was by the number of buttons one wore. Another that the original design was based on armour which was designed so that a right-handed opponent would not catch their weapon in the seam and tear through, and that a person could draw a weapon with their right-hand without catching it in a loose seam of their own clothes.

While most women prefer to have the top button open for better comfort, some blouses made for women have looser necklines so the top button can be fastened without compromising comfort, but giving the same stylish appearance.

Some women attach various pins and ornaments to their blouses over a fastened top button for style. Some of these attach directly to the button itself, others to the collars.

== History ==
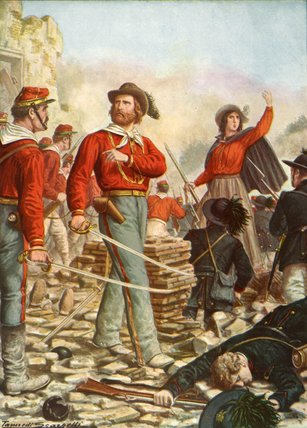
Giuseppe Garibaldi (center), the Italian patriot, and his wife Anita (right), popularized the red Garibaldi shirt, a type of military blouse which became popular as early 1860s civilian fashion with both men and women in Europe and North America.

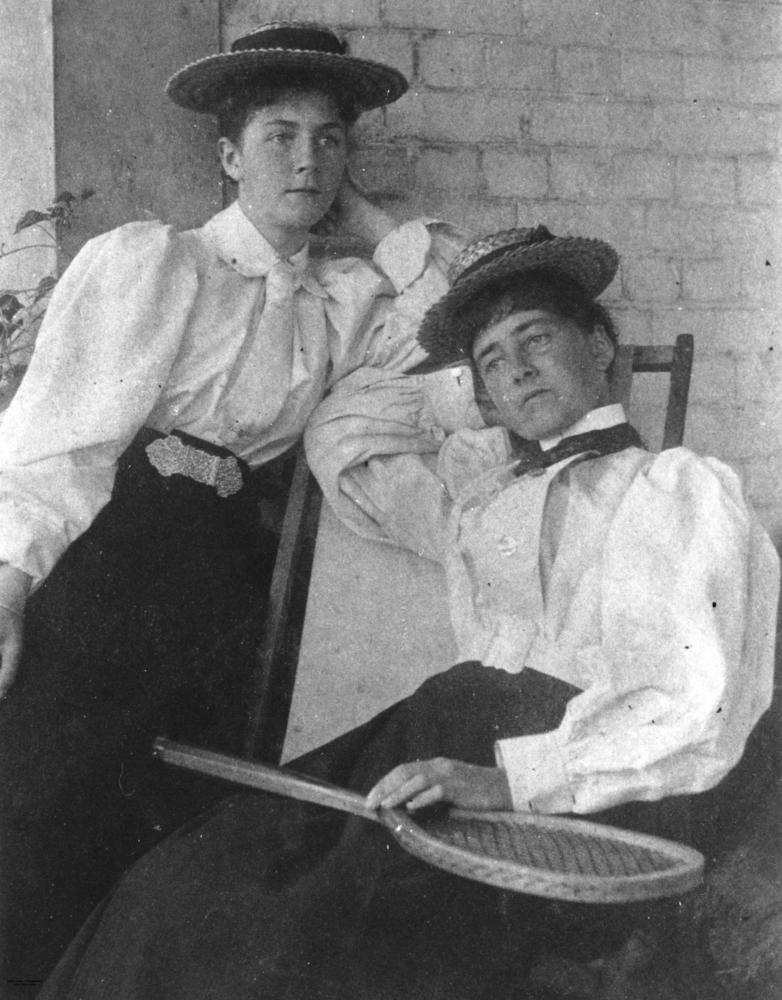
Blouses from 1890 to 1900 Australia

=== Pre-World War I ===
Blouses are historically a smock style garment that were rarely part of the fashionable woman's wardrobe until the 1890s. Before that time, they were occasionally popular for informal wear in styles that echoed peasant or traditional clothing, such as the Garibaldi shirt of the 1860s.

Some blouses do not have a top button at all, and collars are intentionally styled to be open. They also form part of some nations' traditional folk costume.

During the later Victorian period blouses became common for informal, practical wear. A simple blouse with a plain skirt was the standard dress for the newly expanded female (non-domestic) workforce of the 1890s, especially for those employed in office work. In the 1900s and 1910s, elaborate blouses, such as the "lingerie blouse" (so-called because they were heavily decorated with lace and embroidery in a style formerly restricted to underwear) and the "Gibson Girl blouse" with tucks and pleating, became immensely popular for day-wear and even some informal evening wear. Since then, blouses have remained a wardrobe staple, so by now blouses have not ceased to be fixed in the "popular cloakroom" style.

German magazine Die Woche wrote in 1913 about ladies' blouses in connection with riding:

"Even if more and more justification is given for the hot summer days of the casual blouse, the classic riding dress made of velvet or English linen still remains unmatched."

At the end of the 19th century the sailor blouses derived from sailor suits were popular for girls to the blue pleated skirt. In the 1950s, the sailor's look then entered the leisure mode for adults.

The high collar in blouses was pushed out during this time by the halsferne variant. Specialist shops also offered "ladies' cloaks". KdW in Berlin applied in his illustrated main catalog: 1913 among other things a backfisch-confection, with eight blouses between 2.75 and 9.50 Marks. The simplest model was a "wash blouse, navy, white spotted", the most expensive one "blouse, white, wash, with tip and stick". One of the novelties of the season was the pointed "Charmeuse blouse, very elegant form, pure silk, with very fluffy crepe and lace gown".

=== The inter-war years ===
Various new and different forms of collar emerged in the 1920s. They diminished in sizes by the 1950s, but were often large in the 1930s.

The silk 'jumper blouse' and the low-cut 'V-neck shirt' (or Chelsea collared blouse) were the fashion hit of the 1920s. They had full length, short, 3/4 length and bell shaped sleeves.

=== Styles since World War II ===
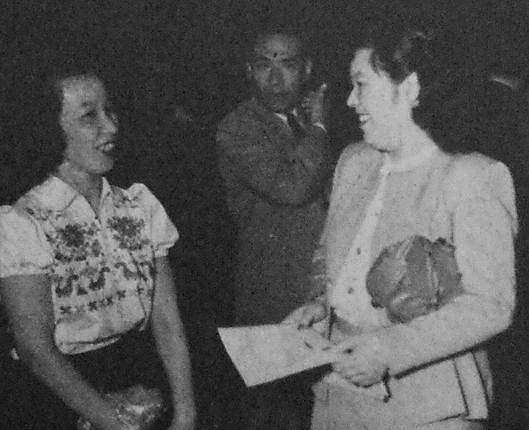
A Japanese blouse (left), in 1951

The size of collars had diminished by the 1950s, but were huge in the 1930 s. At the beginning of the 1970s, popular styles included the rounded collar, sausage dog collar, then extra wide collar and double cuffs from shirts, that fell on them often from fashions relating to synthetic fabrics like usually polyester. The fashion of standing collar and federal collar, loops, rounded collars, revere collar and the smallest collar, sometimes with concealed button fly on a "smoking blouse", attached folds and stressed set-in-followed in the 1980s. Again, thin and often shining synthetic fibres were very popular. Towards the end of the 20th century, they were of an extra-long blouses of pants style and worn over trousers or skirt worn, optionally combined with a rather wide belt around the waist in Germany, the Netherlands, Belgium, Denmark, Poland, the UK, Ireland, South Africa and North America.

The sleeves had been shortened during the early 1950s to the 1/2 and 1/4 length in Europe. They were reduced again in the mid-1990s and are now regularly at the 7/8, 1/2, 1/3 and 1/4 length around the world. As the eye will be drawn to the naked flesh below the sleeve, designers often use sleeve length to focus the minds eye on the slimmer parts of the arm, particularly short sleeve blouses below the elbow to give the illusion of a slimmer arm. Sleeveless tops were fashionable and a topical item in Western Europe and North America during the mid-2000s.

Many fashionable styles of both the 1970s and 1980s were on the go again after the millennium in the blouse fashion: double cuffs, extra wide pointed collar, belt around the waist, synthetic fibre and the like. Often the blouses also embroidery or "crystal stocking", have especially on collar and string. The blouses with the so-called three-quarter arm were a striking phenomenon of the 1990s. Blouses can be combined well and easily with a blazer, tank top, bolero or sweater, with or without some colourful silks or bead chain necklaces. The change in fashion in blouse is very visible now. Mostly the sleeves have been changed and it turned out to be more modern and fashionable. Sleeves have played a major role in blouse designs.

=== Eco movement ===
As part of the Eco movement, folk blouses for women were cut from natural materials such as flax, linen and cotton. Men also wore these "Frisian blouses" on occasion.

== Cultural blouse styles ==
=== Use with a dirndl ===
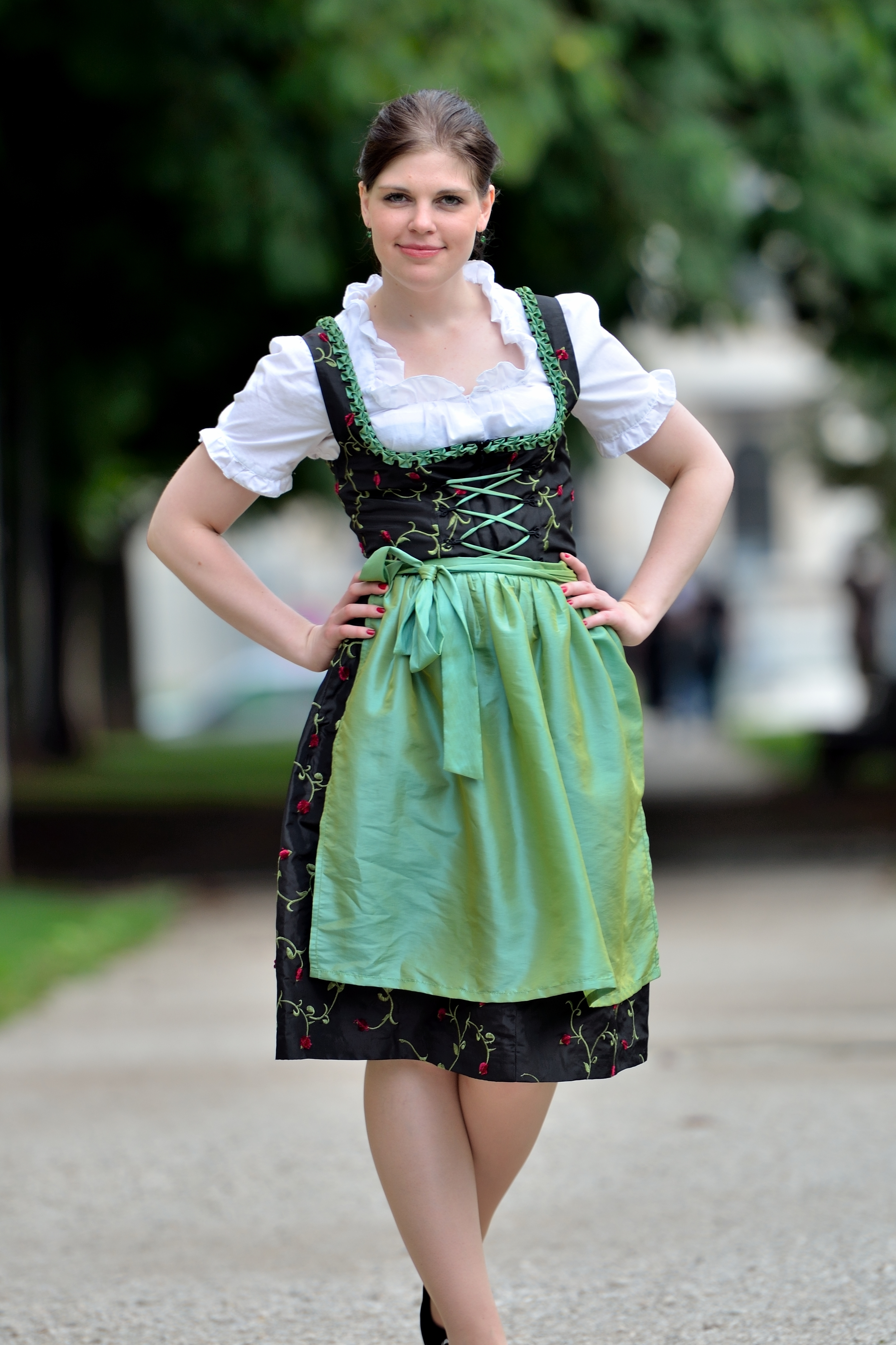
A woman wearing a dirndl. The white part on her torso and arms is the blouse.

The traditional dirndl of Bavaria and rural Austria is usually worn with a white blouse. These blouses are usually made of light fabric (textile), such as silk or cotton thin, until the early 1990s still often from soft covered by art faserstoffen (such as polyester and satin). They often have fanciful decorations (such as frills, embroidery, or grinding) and are a classic among the women's blouses—here the fashionable combination possibilities are especially varied. The open Spaten—or lapel collar—is another common type of a classic ladies' blouse.

The blouse is worn under the bodice of the dirndl. It is cropped above the midriff. The blouse changes the overall effect of the dirndl especially through the cut of its neckline. A deeply cut blouse combines with a deeply cut bodice to accentuate décolletage, whereas a blouse with a high neckline creates a more modest effect. In traditional designs, the blouse neckline is at the base of the throat. Other popular necklines are V-shaped, balconette or heart-shaped. Materials most often used are cambric, linen or lace; the colour is usually white. Short puff sleeves are typical, although narrow sleeves (short or long) are also common.

=== Use in Aboyne dress ===
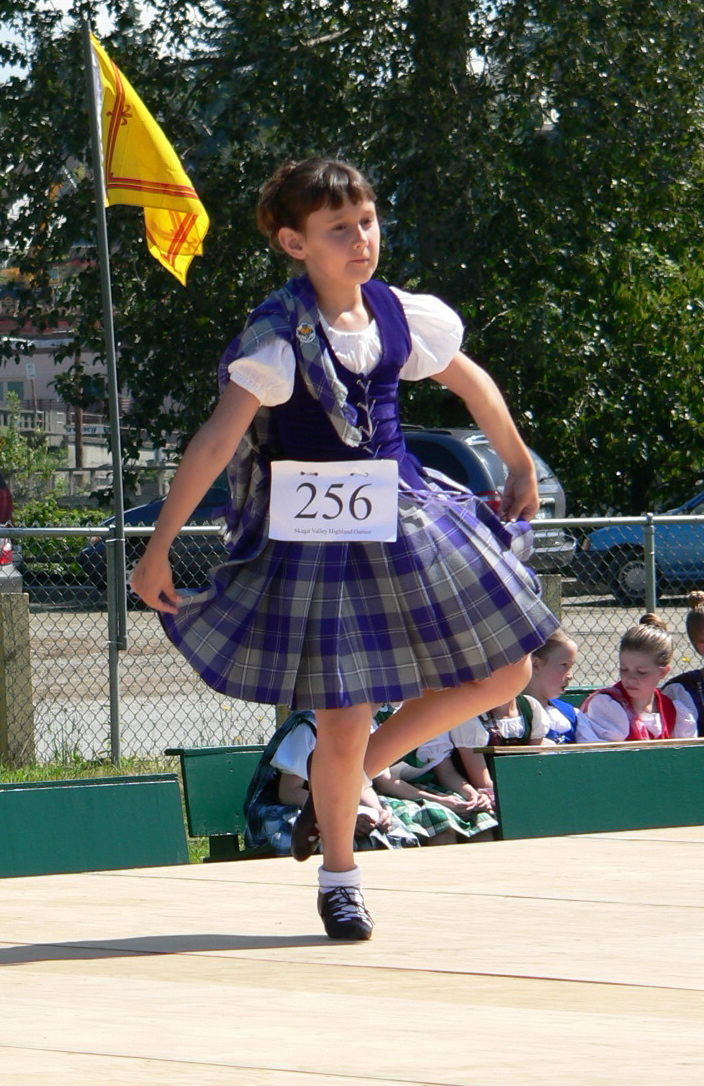
A young Highland dancer wearing the Aboyne dress prescribed for female dancers for the National dances

In one version, a tartan pattern skirt is worn with an over-the-shoulder plaid, a white blouse and petticoat, and a velvet bodice. The alternative is a white dress over a petticoat, together with a tartan pattern sash. A typical Aboyne dress consists of a dark bodice or elaborate waistcoat, decorative blouse, full tartan skirt and some times a petticoat and apron. Some have a tartan sash (usually draped over the shoulder and coming down towards the hem of the skirt in the back) rather than an apron.

=== The blouse jacket or blouson ===
The blouse jacket or blouson is a garment drawn tight at the waist with blousing hanging over the waist band. The new style of man's Chetten loose blouse coat is made of stronger material or with inner lining, which can be worn alone or as a step on for a top. It is related to the Eisenhower jacket.

== See also ==
- Choli
- Dress
- Skirt
