= Kitty Foyle (radio and TV series) =

Kitty Foyle is an American old-time radio and television soap opera originally aired during the 1940s and 1950s that was based on the 1940 film of the same name starring Ginger Rogers. Kitty Foyle was created by soap opera mogul Irna Phillips of Guiding Light fame and produced by daytime radio monarchs Frank and Anne Hummert of Helen Trent recognition. The program originally starred Julie Stevens in the title role of Kitty Foyle on radio. On television, the title role was portrayed by Kathleen Murray.

Each episode primarily focused on Foyle's ongoing relationship with a doctor in the neighborhood, (played on radio by Bud Collyer and on television by William Redfield), and the relationship between her and her father. Each episode also usually involved a flashback and was set in Philadelphia.

The radio version of Kitty Foyle ran on NBC's daytime schedule from October 5, 1942–June 9, 1944. NBC Television aired the show during the afternoons from January 13–June 27, 1958.

== Radio program ==
Kitty Foyle
- Genre: Soap opera
- Running time: 15 minutes
- Country of origin: United States
- Language: English
- Syndicates: CBS
- TV adaptations: Kitty Foyle
- Starring: Julie Stevens; Bud Collyer; Mark Smith; Victor Thorley; Amanda Randolph
- Announcer: Mel Allen
- Created by: Irna Phillips
- Produced by: Frank Hummert; Anne Hummert
- Original release: October 5, 1942 – June 9, 1944
- No. of series: 2
- Sponsored by: General Mills

Kitty Foyle originally began on the radio. The program evolved from a segment on the short-lived radio program Stories America Loves which only ran a year on CBS. The first Kitty Foyle segment was broadcast in June 1942. However, the program had further origin to a 1939 best-selling novel written by Christopher Morley. The novel became the premise for the popular 1940 film of the same name starring Ginger Rogers. The film also resulted in a popular dress of the 1940s.

The program was created by soap opera mogul Irna Phillips and was produced by daytime radio monarchs Frank and Anne Hummert.

The program starred future Helen Trent, (another Hummert production), star Julie Stevens in the title role of Kitty Foyle. Bud Collyer, who was the voice of Superman at the time, portrayed the role of Wyn Strafford, the love interest of Kitty Foyle. Also a part of the Foyle family were Mark Smith and Victor Thorley who portrayed Kitty's father Pop Foyle and her brother Ed Foyle, respectively. Sportscaster Mel Allen served as the announcer.

The soap opera was broadcast from October 5, 1942 to June 9, 1944 on CBS Radio. The program was sponsored by General Mills.

=== History ===
==== Christopher Morley's Kitty Foyle ====
In 1939, Christopher Morley wrote and published a novel also titled Kitty Foyle. The plot of the novel tells the story of a white-collar girl who falls in love with a young socialite, despite the objections of his family. Contemporary Authors noted: "Central to the story is protagonist Kitty's affair with the affluent Wyn Strafford. Critics heatedly debated Morley's sexual sensationalism," notably her out-of-wedlock pregnancy and abortion.

The story is told by Kitty in the first person. A sociologist suggests that "Kitty, in her observations of the mores and behavior patterns of the upper class acts as the anthropological alter ego of Morley, viewing the upper class from the outside."

The book was a bestseller in 1939 and 1940.

==== Formation ====
===== Irna Phillips =====
In 1941, Irna Phillips, creator of the soap opera Guiding Light, first proposed the idea of a serialized version of the award-winning film released a year earlier to Lady Esther cosmetics. Lady Esther rejected but General Mills soon accepted.

===== General Mills, the Hummerts and Stories America Loves =====
By the early 1940s, General Mills had been looking for a way to break into radio. Their first big break came in 1941 when the company became the official sponsor of The Lone Ranger radio program. But within months after landing sponsorship of The Lone Ranger, the company were approached with the idea of a radio program that took popular novels of the time (past or present) and make serialized productions of them. The program was entitled Stories America Loves.

Stories America Loves premiered on CBS October 6, 1941. The program didn't get very much attention until June 1942 when the program began to broadcast segments of the novel Kitty Foyle. The segments became so popular in fact that the rotating story concept of the program was abandoned and by the fall of 1942, the serial Kitty Foyle took over the daytime timeslot of its predecessor.

Frank and Anne Hummert became the producers of the new program. Stories ended its run on October 16, 1942. Kitty Foyle made its radio debut on October 5, 1942. The program premiered to relatively good ratings but soon dropped in the ratings. The program lasted two seasons and ended its run on June 9, 1944.

== Television serial ==
Kitty Foyle
- Genre: Soap opera
- Created by: Irna Phillips
- Based on: Kitty Foyle (radio)
- Written by: Carlton E. Morse
- Directed by: Hal Cooper
- Starring: Kathleen Murray; William Redfield; Bob Hastings; Ralph Dunn
- Country of origin: United States
- Original language: English
- No. of seasons: 1

Production
- Producer: Charles Irving
- Running time: 30 minutes

Original release
- Network: NBC
- Release: January 13 – June 27, 1958

On January 13, 1958, Kitty Foyle premiered on NBC Television. Under new direction and an all new cast, the show went underway. When it premiered, Kitty Foyle was NBC's first thirty-minute soap opera. At the time, 15 minutes was the standard for a televised daytime soap opera.

The televised version of Kitty Foyle starred up-and-coming actress Kathleen Murray in the title role of Irish secretary Kitty Foyle. The program also starred actor William Redfield as Foyle's love interest Wyn Strafford and character actors Bob Hastings and Ralph Dunn in the roles of her brother Ed and father 'Pop' Foyle, respectively. Also in the cast were Judy Lewis, Les Damon and a very young Patty Duke.

The series was produced by Charles Irving. Carlton E. Morse, writer for radio's One Man's Family, served as head writer of the series. Hal Cooper was the director of the series and the series was packaged and distributed by Henry Jaffee Enterprises.

The television version of Kitty Foyle did not go well with viewers. The story seemed tailor-made for the daytime serial market, but it wasn't. Perhaps the story was too familiar, or perhaps once the basic story was told, there was nothing else to say about Kitty and her problems.

The serial only lasted five months and ended its network television run on June 27, 1958.

== Cast and characters ==
=== On radio ===
==== Main cast ====
- Julie Stevens as Kitty Foyle
- Bud Collyer as Dr. Wynnewood 'Wyn' Strafford VI
- Mark Smith as 'Pop' Foyle
- Victor Thorley as Ed Foyle

==== Supporting cast ====
- Amanda Randolph

=== On television ===
==== Main ====
- Kathleen Murray as Kitty Foyle
- William Redfield as Dr. Wynnewood 'Wyn' Strafford VI; his mother was played by Valerie Cossart, daughter of Ernest Cossart who played 'Pop' Foyle in the 1940 film version of the book.
- Ralph Dunn as 'Pop' Foyle
- Bob Hastings as Ed Foyle

==== Supporting ====
- Kay Medford as Sophie Foyle
- Larry Robinson as Mac Foyle
- Judy Lewis as Molly Scharf
- Les Damon as Rosie Rittenhouse
- Marie Worsham as Stacy Lee Balla

== Broadcast history ==
On the radio, Kitty Foyle could be heard every weekday for 15 minutes from 1942 to 1944 beginning at 10:15 a.m. over CBS Radio. On television, the program could be seen every weekday for thirty minutes beginning at 2:30 pm on NBC.

== See also ==
- List of radio soaps
