= Zouave jacket =

Short, open-fronted jacket with long sleeves

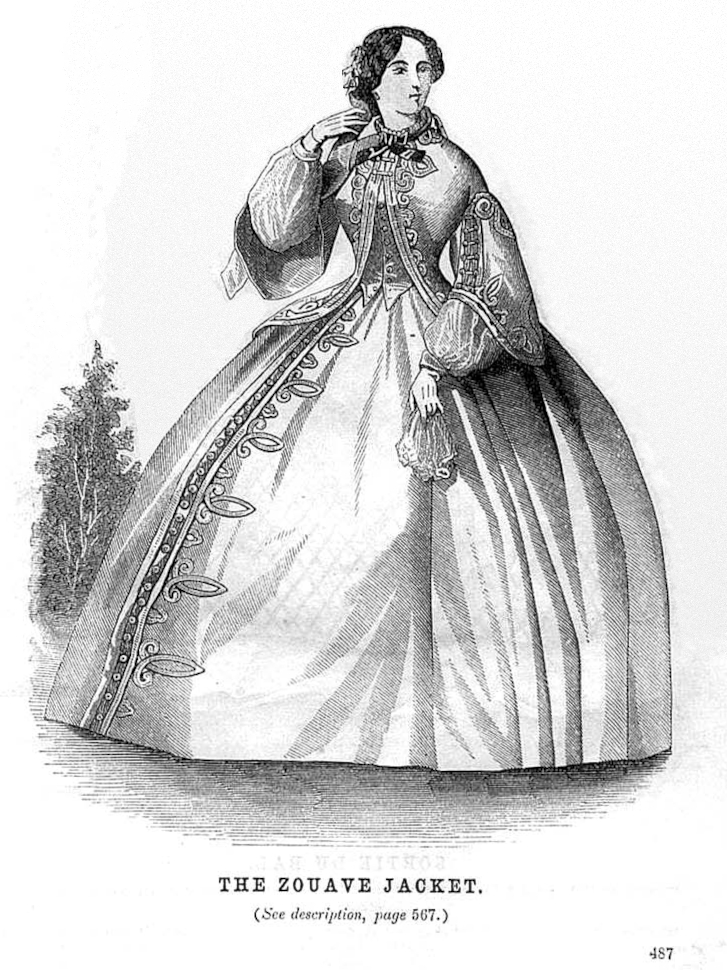
An 1859 image of a woman wearing a Zouave jacket

A Zouave jacket is a short open-fronted jacket with long sleeves, similar to that historically worn by the Algerian Zouave infantry of the French Army.

It was a popular women's fashion in the 19th century in the United States. Colorful, braid-trimmed Zouave jackets became fashionable in the late 1850s and remained so well into the 1860s. Although generally out of fashion after the 1860s, it became locally popular again in some parts of the country towards the end of the 19th century.

== See also ==
- 1850s in fashion
- Bolero jacket
- Garibaldi shirt, another military-inspired fashion of the same era
