= Kitty Foyle (novel) =

1939 novel by Christopher Morley

- First edition
- Author: Christopher Morley
- Language: English
- Publisher: Lippincott
- Publication date: 1939
- Publication place: United States
- Media type: Print (hardback & paperback)
- OCLC: 466657

Kitty Foyle is a 1939 American novel by Christopher Morley. A bestseller in 1939 and 1940, it was adapted as a popular 1940 film, and was republished during World War II as an Armed Services Edition.

The novel tells of a white-collar girl who falls in love with a young socialite, despite the objections of his family. Contemporary Authors noted: "Central to the story is protagonist Kitty's affair with the affluent Wyn Strafford. Critics heatedly debated Morley's sexual sensationalism," notably the main character's out-of-wedlock pregnancy and abortion.

The story is told by Kitty in the first person. A sociologist suggests that "Kitty, in her observations of the mores and behavior patterns of the upper class acts as the anthropological alter ego of Morley, viewing the upper class from the outside."

Kitty Foyle is one of the works for which the publishing firm of J.B. Lippincott is remembered.

== Radio and television ==
In addition to the successful 1940 film, Kitty Foyle was adapted to radio. It was heard on the serialized anthology Stories America Loves, broadcast on CBS from October 6, 1941, to October 2, 1942. The serial of Kitty Foyle, beginning in June 1942 with Julie Stevens in the title role, proved so popular with the listening audience that Stories America Loves was dropped, and the title was simply changed to Kitty Foyle on October 5, 1942. Others in the cast were Bud Collyer and Mark Smith. The series continued until June 9, 1944.

The Kitty Foyle television series, starring Kathleen Murray, debuted in 1958 and was telecast on NBC for two seasons.

== Reception ==
Margaret Wallace, reviewing the novel in The New York Times, called it "sparkling."

There is no use trying to pick good things out of this book. Something on almost every page clamors for quotation.

Wallace says that Morley first thought of calling the novel Nation Wide, showing that "he considered its problem national in scope and of social significance." Wallace points to a paragraph from the novel which can be taken as a statement of the problem:

Molly and me had a talk one time about the White Collar Women, there's millions of them, getting maybe 15 to 30 a week, they've got to dress themselves right up to the hilt, naturally they have a yen for social pleasure, need to be a complete woman with all a woman's satisfactions and they need a chance to be creating and doing. And the men their own age can't do much for them, also the girls grow up too damn fast because they absorb the point of view of older people they work for. Their own private life gets to be a rat race. Jesusgod, I read about the guts of the pioneer woman and the woman of the dustbowl and the gingham goddess of the covered wagon. What about the woman of the covered typewriter? What has she got, poor kid, when she leaves the office? ... [Molly said] "Do you know what we are? we're sharecroppers. We work like nigger hands in a cotton field and give Palmer's more brainwork than they'd know what to do with and what do we get for it? Eight hour's sleep, I guess, because that's about all we're fit for.

Wallace notes that Morley "knows Philadelphia and pokes fun at it constantly, with a sharpness born of long and affectionate intimacy."
