= Julie Stevens (American actress, born 1916) =

American actress (1916–1984)

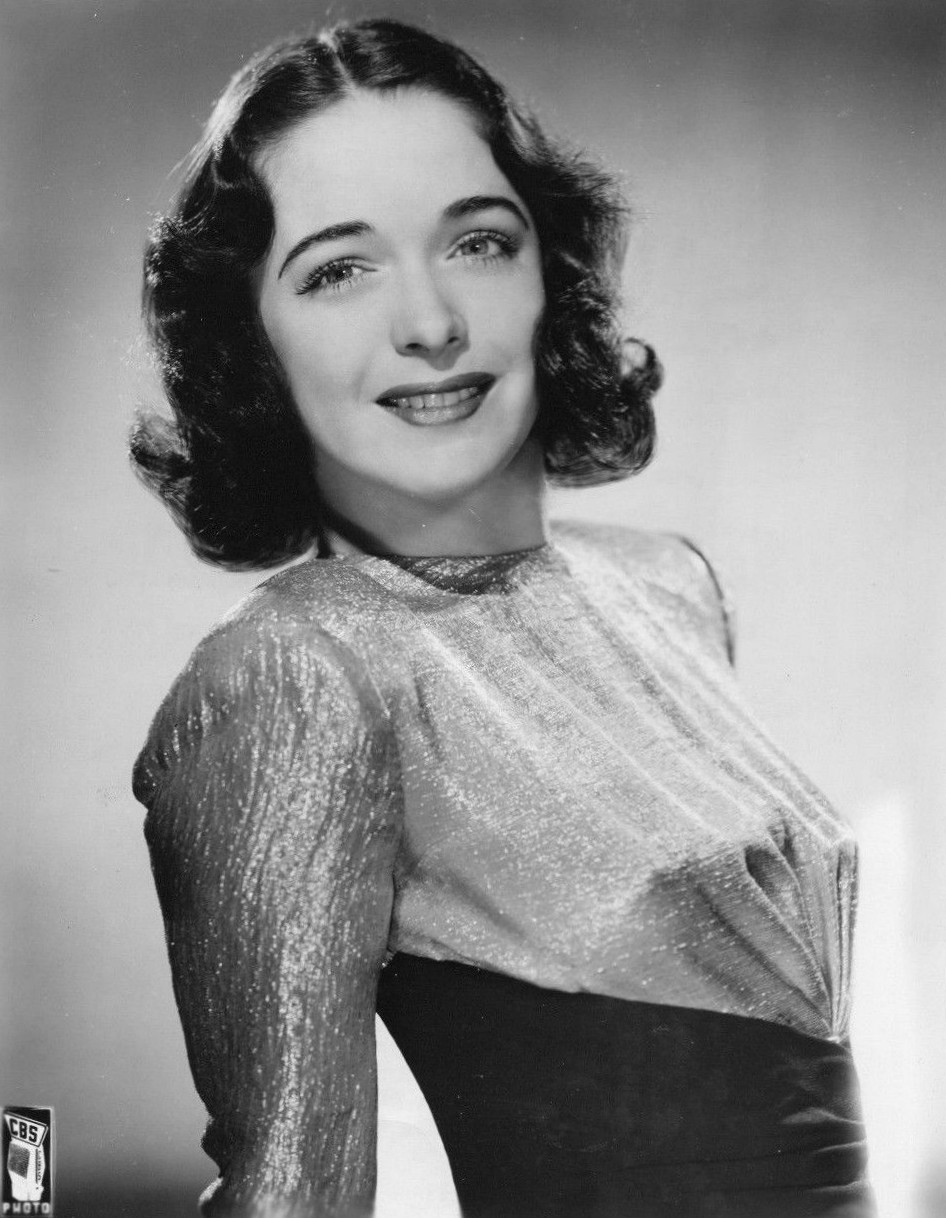
- Stevens in 1944
- Born: Harriet Foote; November 23, 1916; St. Louis, Missouri, U.S.
- Died: August 26, 1984 (aged 67); Wellfleet, Massachusetts, U.S.
- Education: Columbia College, Columbia, Missouri
- Occupation: Actress
- Known for: Playing Helen Trent in the radio soap opera, The Romance of Helen Trent
- Spouse: Charles Underhill (1944–1982; his death)
- Children: 2 daughters

Julie Stevens (born Harriet Foote; November 23, 1916 – August 26, 1984) was an American actress who performed on radio, television, the stage, and in movies. She is best known for her 16-year run as the title character in The Romance of Helen Trent on radio.

== Early years ==
Born in St. Louis, Missouri, as Harriet Foote in 1916, Stevens attended Christian College.

When she was 13, Stevens danced in a musical production of Provincetown's Wharf Theater. She later acted with the St. Louis Little Theater. She also acted in Shakespearean productions at the San Diego Globe Theatre and was an actress with the Pasadena Playhouse. Despite that experience, Stevens was unable to land an acting job in New York, which led her to work as an usher at the Empire Theatre until an opportunity arose.

== Radio ==
Stevens' work in radio began in 1940. Although she appeared in many programs in old-time radio, most of her work there was in soap operas, especially Abie's Irish Rose, Ethel and Albert, Kitty Foyle, The Light of the World, Road of Life, and Stella Dallas. She was best known, however, for playing the title role in The Romance of Helen Trent for 16 years. Radio historian Jim Cox reported that auditions for the Trent role occurred the day that Foyle (on which Stevens played the title role) had its final broadcast. He wrote:

She recalled dashing across the street to CBS in a torrential downpour after her final performance as Kitty to participate in the Trent competition. Soaked to the skin from the rain, she was met by another actress who had already auditioned. "Why on earth would you be interested in this part, Julie?" quipped the woman. "You're much too young to play it." Stevens was in her mid-20s and felt a little dejected by those words. But the producers never detected it. Stevens' crisp, velvet tones readily persuaded them, and she was signed for the lead.

In other genres, Stevens had the female lead in Abbott Mysteries and appeared often in Grand Central Station, Gang Busters and Quick as a Flash. She also appeared on Front Page Farrell, Just Plain Bill, Romance The Adventures of Ellery Queen, Crime Club, Doctor Standish, Medical Examiner, Broadway Is My Beat, and Secret Missions.

Stevens was named "Favorite Radio Dramatic Actress" in two consecutive polls (1957–58 and 1958–59) of readers of TV Radio Mirror magazine.

== Television ==
Stevens was one of five actresses who played reporter Lorelei Kilbourne in Big Town. She had the role in the 1951-1952 season.

== Stage ==
Stevens' first on-stage role in a Broadway production was that of Patricia Stanley in The Male Animal in 1940. Prior to that, she had an uncredited off-screen role, screaming in Censored, a production that lasted for only nine performances. Her other Broadway roles included Sue in Snookie (1941), Jean in Brooklyn, U.S.A. (1941–42), Helen in Proof Thro' the Night (1942–43), Hannah in The World's Full of Girls (1943), and Winifred Agate in Sleep My Pretty One (1944).

== Film ==
Impressed by Stevens' work as an ingenue in the Pasadena Playhouse's production of Yes, My Darling Daughter, executives of Warner Bros. studios expressed interest in her. On May 18, 1939, she was signed as a contract player with Warner Bros. Her films included Tear Gas Squad, Honeymoon Deferred, and Private Detective.

== Personal life ==
In 1944, Stevens married U.S. Steel executive Charles Underhill, who died in 1982. They had two daughters, Nancy and Sara.

== Later years ==
Stevens returned to radio after moving to Wellfleet, Massachusetts. She was co-host of a program on WVLC in Orleans, Massachusetts. She also was involved with community theaters in Cape Cod, Massachusetts.

== Death ==
Stevens died of cancer August 26, 1984, aged 67, at her home in Wellfleet, Massachusetts. She was survived by two daughters and a sister. A memorial service was held September 9, 1984, at Eastham United Methodist Church.
