= Shrug (clothing) =

Short jacket, generally worn open in front

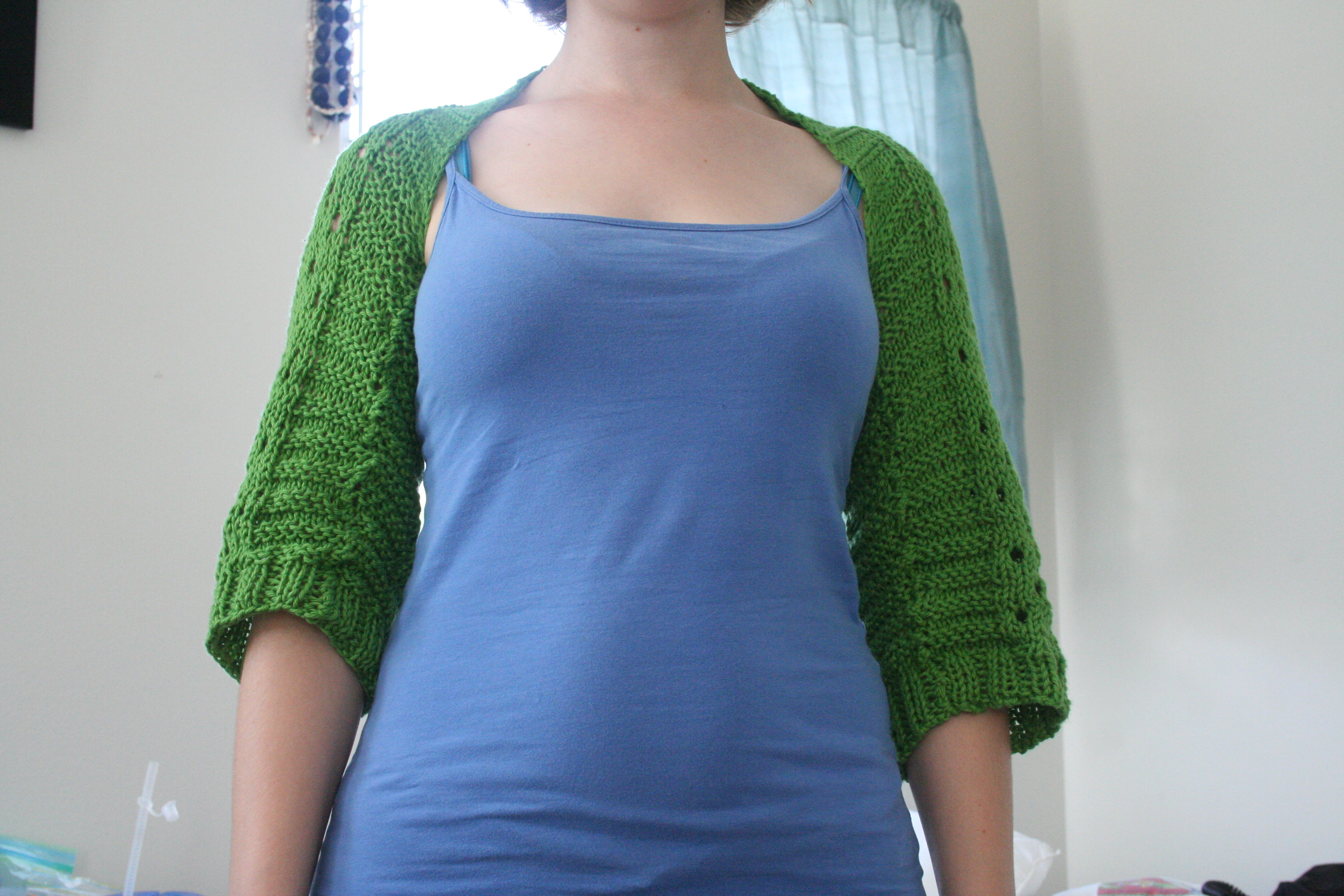
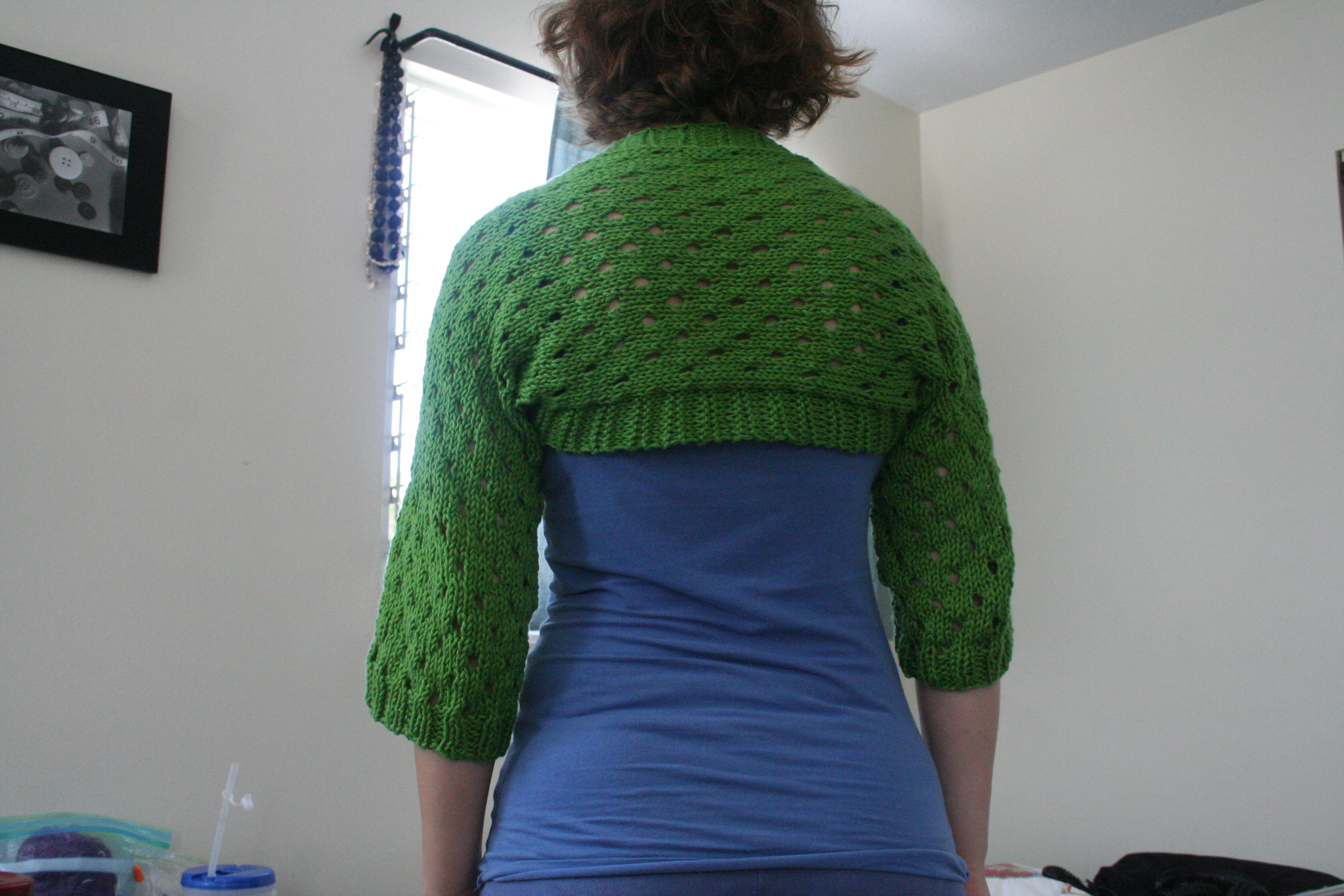
Front and back of a knit shrug

A shrug is a cropped, cardigan-like garment with short or long sleeves cut in one with the body, typically knitted or crocheted. Generally, a shrug covers less of the body than a vest would, but it is more tailored than a shawl. Shrugs are typically worn as the outermost layer of an outfit, with a full shirt, tank top, or dress beneath.

A bolero jacket or bolero (pronounced /ˈbɒləroʊ/ or /bəˈlɛəroʊ/ in British English and /bəˈlɛəroʊ/ in American English) is a more formal garment of similar construction but made of stiffer fabric, essentially a short tailored jacket, inspired by the matador's chaquetilla. Like the shrug, the sides of the bolero only meet at one point.

== See also ==
- Zouave jacket
