= Kitty Foyle (dress) =

1940s style of woman's dress

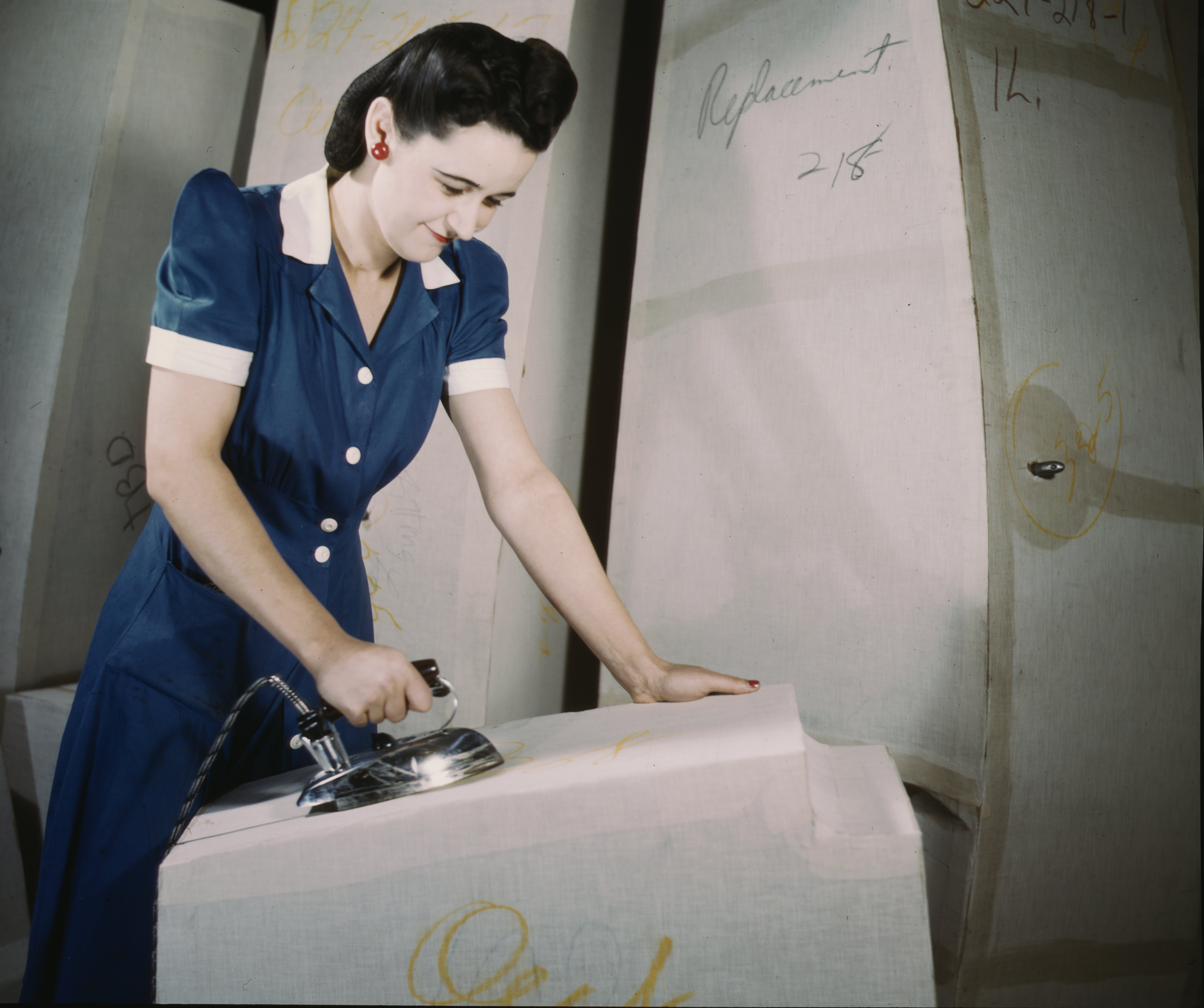
Kitty Foyle dress, 1941

Kitty Foyle is a dress style of the 1940s, characterized by a dark fabric and contrasting light collar and cuffs, typically of navy blue and white. The shape of the dress is a shirtwaist with short or elbow-length sleeves.

It is named after a dress worn by Ginger Rogers' character, Kitty Foyle, in the 1940 film of the same name, designed by Renié. The style has been explained as being deliberately intended for films, the large amount of white around the face reflecting the key light onto the face, giving a well-defined and flattering profile. As a modest and practical style that was easily copied at home, or could even be used to update an old shirtwaist dress to a new fashion by applying a new collar, it became popular during the wartime austerity period.

The style has returned to fashion at times since. The designer Jill Richards, herself a Hollywood actress of around the same era, favoured it in her collections of the 1970s, attracting a clientele of names such as Nancy Reagan.

This dress has also been adopted more recently as an adaption of the Gothic Lolita style. It takes the usual Gothic Lolita themes of modesty, tradition and monochrome colours of a dark base with a light contrast, but applies them to a later period with simpler lines, rather than the more usual antebellum fussy bows and flounces. This style is typified by characters such as Lenore, the Cute Little Dead Girl and Wednesday Addams.
