= 6th Regiment, European Brigade =

6th Louisiana Infantry Regiment (Confederate)
- Disbanded: May 2, 1862
- Country: Confederate States of America
- Allegiance: Confederate States Army
- Type: Militia
- Size: 500
- Nickname: Garibaldi Legion
- Patron: Giuseppe Garibaldi
- Motto: Vincere o Morire
- Engagements: American Civil War: Battle of Forts Jackson and St. Philip; Capture of New Orleans

The 6th Louisiana Infantry Regiment, sometimes 6th Regiment, European Brigade, originally the Italian Guards Battalion, and commonly referred to as the Garibaldi Legion in honor of the Italian revolutionary Giuseppe Garibaldi (who vocally supported the Union), was a militia that fought for the Confederate Army in Louisiana during the American Civil War. They were well known for showing their ethnic pride by wearing cocked hats with plumes in the Italian national colors as well as adopting the red uniform worn by Garibaldi's soldiers.

== Service ==
Asides from miscellaneous skirmishes, the 6th Regiment was primarily tasked with protecting the city of New Orleans from a Union invasion or civil unrest in the city. Because most regular units were sent out to the frontlines, the state became defenseless. To solve this issue, Governor Thomas Overton Moore issued a call to arms for the regiment to deploy throughout the state. The regiment acted as the home guard in the city and Louisiana in general for the duration the regiment was deployed. The regiment was disbanded on May 2, 1862, one day after the city fell to Union forces.

== Total strength ==
During peak membership, the 6th Regiment, European Brigade numbered around 500 soldiers with the vast majority of them being first or second generation immigrants from Europe.

== Commanders ==
- Lt. Col. Joseph G. Della Valle
- Captain Marzoni Gaudenzio
- Captain Giuseppe Santini
- First Lieutenant Ulysses Marinoni
- Second Lieutenant Ernesto Baselli

== See also ==
- List of Louisiana Confederate Civil War units
- Italian Americans in the Civil War
- 39th New York Infantry Regiment, a Union regiment also named after Giuseppe Garibaldi.
