= Kitty Foyle (film) =

1940 film by Sam Wood

- Theatrical release poster
- Directed by: Sam Wood
- Screenplay by: Dalton Trumbo
- Based on: Kitty Foyle by Christopher Morley
- Produced by: David Hempstead
- Starring: Ginger Rogers; Dennis Morgan; James Craig
- Cinematography: Robert De Grasse
- Edited by: Henry Berman
- Music by: Roy Webb
- Distributed by: RKO Radio Pictures
- Release date: December 27, 1940
- Running time: 108 minutes
- Country: United States
- Language: English
- Budget: $738,000
- Box office: $2.4 million

Kitty Foyle (subtitled: The Natural History of a Woman) is a 1940 American drama film starring Ginger Rogers, Dennis Morgan, and James Craig, based on Christopher Morley's 1939 bestselling novel of the same name. The film focuses on a working class woman from Philadelphia who falls in love with a young socialite, soon finding herself at odds with his austere family.

Rogers won the Academy Award for Best Actress for her portrayal of the title character, and the dress she wore in the film became known as a Kitty Foyle dress.

== Plot ==
Kitty Foyle, a young Irish American saleswoman in a New York City boutique owned by Delphine Detaille, faces a life-changing decision: marry her fiancé, a poor doctor named Mark Eisen, or run away to South America with a rich man she has loved for many years, the married Wyn Strafford, who is about to leave his wife and young son. She is on the verge of choosing Wyn and, as she wrestles with her choice, the film flashes back to her youth in Philadelphia.

As a teenager, Kitty gawks at the city's elite Main Liners in a parade that precedes their annual Assembly Ball. Her father warns against getting carried away with her fantasies. Ironically, Kitty meets the embodiment of her dreams in an acquaintance of his: Wynnewood Strafford VI, the scion of a wealthy Main Line family. Wyn offers her a secretarial job at his fledgling magazine. The two fall in love, but when the magazine folds, he does not have the will to defy his family's expectations by proposing to a woman who is far beneath him socially.

With the death of her father and no prospect of marriage to Wyn, Kitty goes to work in New York City for Delphine. One day, she presses the burglar alarm button by mistake at Delphine's fashion store. She pretends to faint to cover her blunder and is attended to by Dr. Mark Eisen. Mark, aware that she is faking unconsciousness, playfully blackmails her into a first date.

Wyn finally breaks down, finds Kitty in New York City, and proposes to her, presenting her with a family heirloom ring. She agrees to marry him on the condition that they not live in Philadelphia. When he introduces her to his family, she gets a chilly reception. She also learns that Wyn would be disinherited if he does not remain in Philadelphia and work in the family banking business. Though Wyn is willing to give up his inheritance, she decides that he is not strong enough to deal with poverty. She walks out, and they are divorced.

Kitty returns to New York City, where she takes up with Mark again, but she soon discovers that she is pregnant with Wyn's child. Wyn arranges to meet her, raising her hopes for a reconciliation, but they are dashed when she sees a newspaper announcement of Wyn's engagement to someone of his own social standing. She leaves without seeing him and receives a further blow when their baby dies at birth.

Five years later, Kitty reluctantly agrees to open a Philadelphia branch store for her friend Delphine. By chance, she waits on Wyn's wife and meets their son. Kitty takes the opportunity to entrust the secret return of the family heirloom ring to the boy, prompting Wyn to visit and woo her one final time. The film returns to the dilemma Kitty faced at its beginning. When she decides to marry Mark rather than Wyn, her life takes a new and more promising course.

== Cast ==
- Ginger Rogers as Kitty Foyle
- Dennis Morgan as Wynnewood 'Wyn' Strafford VI
- James Craig as Dr. Mark Eisen
- Edward Ciannelli as Giono
- Ernest Cossart as Pop
- Gladys Cooper as Mrs. Strafford
- Odette Myrtil as Delphine Detaille
- Mary Treen as Pat
- Katharine Stevens as Molly
- Walter Kingsford as Mr. Kennett
- Cecil Cunningham as Grandmother
- Nella Walker as Aunt Jessica
- Edward Fielding as Uncle Edgar
- Kay Linaker as Wyn's Wife
- Richard Nichols as Wyn's Boy
- Larry Steers as Man at Premier (uncredited)

== Production ==
Katharine Hepburn, who starred opposite Rogers (but was frequently at odds with her) in Stage Door, was offered the title role but turned it down.

The film was adapted from Christopher Morley's novel by Dalton Trumbo and Donald Ogden Stewart. It was directed by Sam Wood.

== Release ==
Kitty Foyle was released theatrically in the United States on December 27, 1940.

=== Home media ===
Warner Bros. Home Entertainment released the film on DVD on January 31, 2006.

== Reception ==
=== Box office ===
Kitty Foyle was RKO's top film for 1940, grossing $1,710,000 domestically and $675,000 foreign, and earning a profit of $869,000.

=== Critical response ===
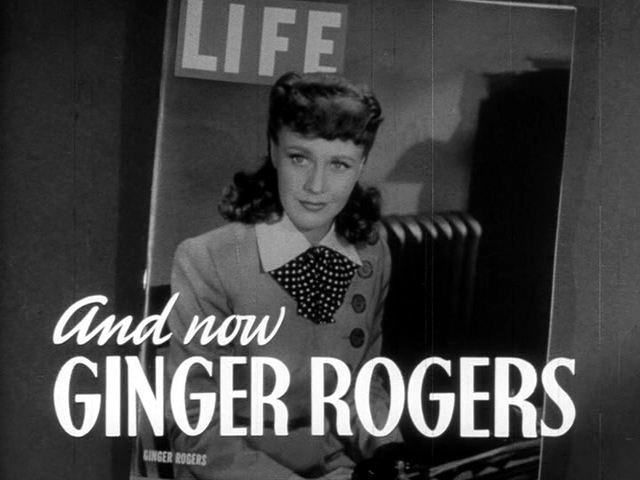
Ginger Rogers as Kitty Foyle

Reviews from critics were generally positive, with many characterizing Rogers's portrayal as "slick but dramatically vulnerable." Bosley Crowther of The New York Times expressed disappointment that the story had been softened from the novel due to Production Code restrictions, but wrote of the protagonist that "Ginger Rogers plays her with as much forthright and appealing integrity as one can possibly expect." Variety wrote "Despite its episodic, and at times, vaguely defined motivation, picture on whole is a poignant and dramatic portraiture of a typical Cinderella girl's love story. Several good comedy sequences interline the footage, deftly written and directed. Ginger Rogers provides strong dramatic portrayal in the title role." Film Daily called it "one of the most human pictures that has been produced in Hollywood in many, many moons ... a triumph for Ginger Rogers." Harrison's Reports wrote "Very good!...The story is simple but realistic; it has deep human appeal, a stirring romance, and delightful comedy bits; moreover, the performances are excellent."

"I am inclined to think that it's Miss Ginger alone who makes 'Kitty Foyle' a better-than-average film and Kitty herself a proper model for those hundreds of thousands of young things who will now be adding a touch of white to their neckline," John Mosher wrote in The New Yorker. "Without Miss Ginger, it would be very easy to remember how often many of the scenes shown in this film have been seen before on the screen."

In 1951, in a series of articles examining film adaptation, Lester Asheim notes that some films "reproduce the costume, housing, and appearance of the novel's prototypes without softening or heightening," but that Kitty Foyle shows the more typical "glamorizing" process of film adaptation:

Kitty Foyle is typical, in every aspect of the adaptation, of the daydream character of film characterization. The glamorizing process carries through from the casting of Ginger Rogers and the Hollywood wardrobe provided her, to such added incidents as Wyn renting an entire nightclub for a night...While the film retains a scene or two of Kitty's crowded apartment shared with two other girls, such scenes are played for comedy and no attempt is made to convey the day-to-day monotony and routine of the working girl.

=== Accolades ===
Award/association	Year	Category	Recipient(s) and nominee(s)	Result	Ref.
Academy Awards	1941	Outstanding Production	David Hempstead	Nominated	
Academy Awards	1941	Best Director	Sam Wood	Nominated	
Academy Awards	1941	Best Actress	Ginger Rogers	Won	
Academy Awards	1941	Best Screenplay	Dalton Trumbo	Nominated	
Academy Awards	1941	Best Sound Recording	John O. Aalberg	Nominated	
National Board of Review	1941	Best Acting	Ginger Rogers (also for Tom, Dick and Harry)	Won	

== Adaptations ==
On December 9, 1940, Life magazine republished a pictorial adaptation that the film's designers had used as models when creating the film. The cover featured Ginger Rogers as the Kitty Foyle character.

Kitty Foyle was adapted as a radio play on the May 5, 1941 episode of Lux Radio Theatre, with Ginger Rogers reprising her role. Rogers also starred in the April 6, 1946 adaptation heard on Academy Award Theater. On March 3, 1947, the play was produced for The Screen Guild Theater, starring Olivia de Havilland.

The story also was adapted into a TV soap opera starring Kathleen Murray as Kitty Foyle.

== Legacy ==
Rogers' dress worn by her became a popular style, taking the name of the film.

== See also ==
- Perfect Strangers, a film that reunited Rogers and Morgan as lovers

== Sources ==
- Jewell, Richard B.; Harbin, Vernon (1982). The RKO Story. New York City, New York: Arlington House. ISBN 978-0-5175-4656-7.
- Parish, James Robert (1971). The RKO Gals. New York City, New York: Arlington House. ISBN 978-0-711-00588-4.
