= Waist (clothing) =

Type of 19th to early 20th c. bodice or blouse

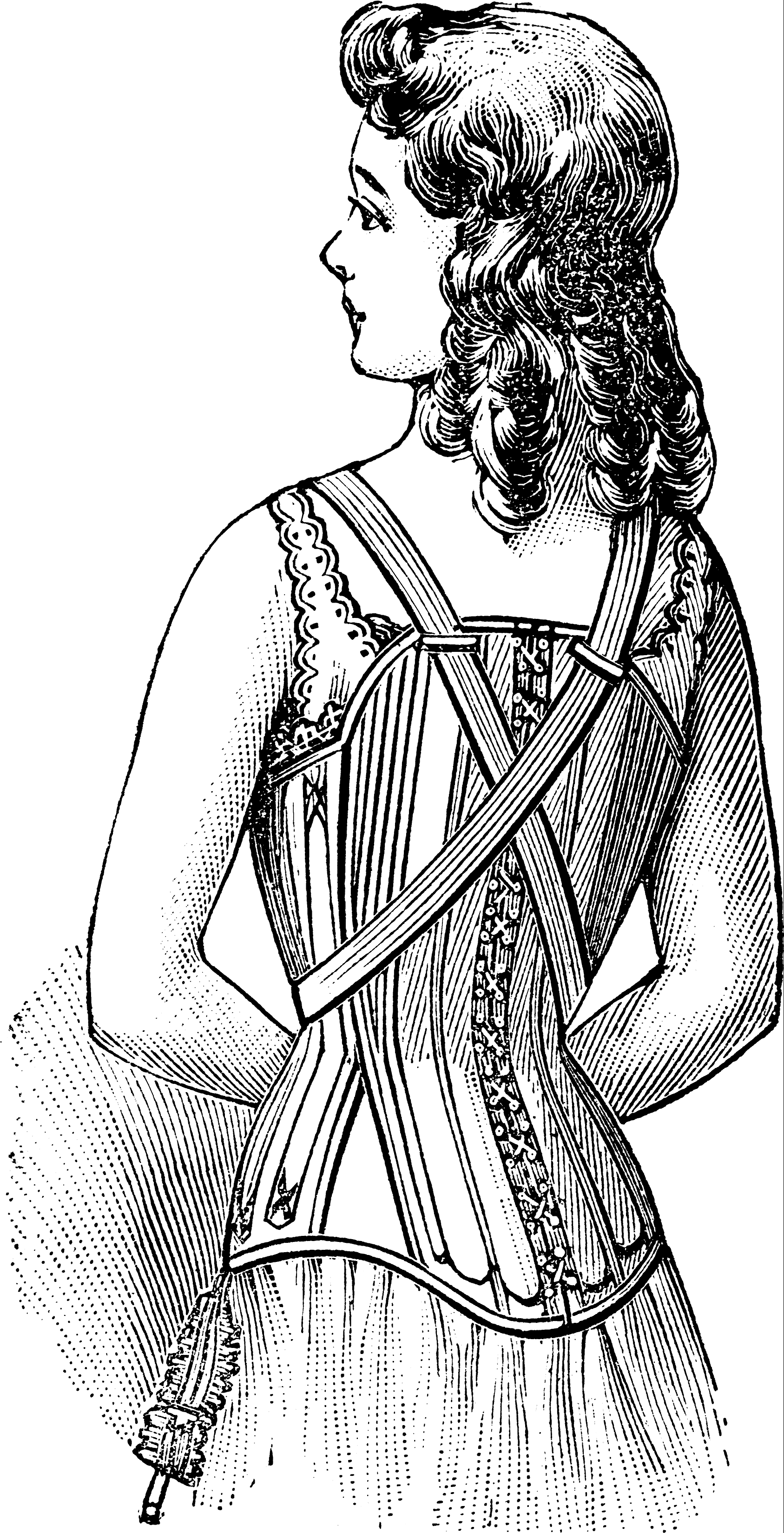
Drawn depiction of a corset bodice on a woman, cinching her waist.

From the early 19th century through the Edwardian period, the word waist was a term common in the United States for the bodice of a dress or for a blouse or woman's shirt. A shirtwaist was originally a separate blouse constructed like a shirt; i.e., of shirting fabric with turnover collar and cuffs and a front button closure. In the later Victorian period, the term became applied more generally to unlined blouses with relatively simple construction and usually of a cotton or linen fabric, but often highly ornamented with embroidery and lace.

Mrs. Inez Montgomery, Shirt-waist, c. 1937, Index of American Design, National Gallery of Art

From the mid-20th century, the term shirt-waist referred to a dress with the upper portion (the bodice and sleeves) fashioned like a man's shirt, with a turnover collar and buttons down the front. Different embroidery were added to the shirtwaist, like rhinestones and different patterns.

Women who entered the workforce often wore this style of garment, and it was thus seen as a symbol of the 'New Women' that emerged in the late 19th century. They were also a staple amongst the suffragettes.

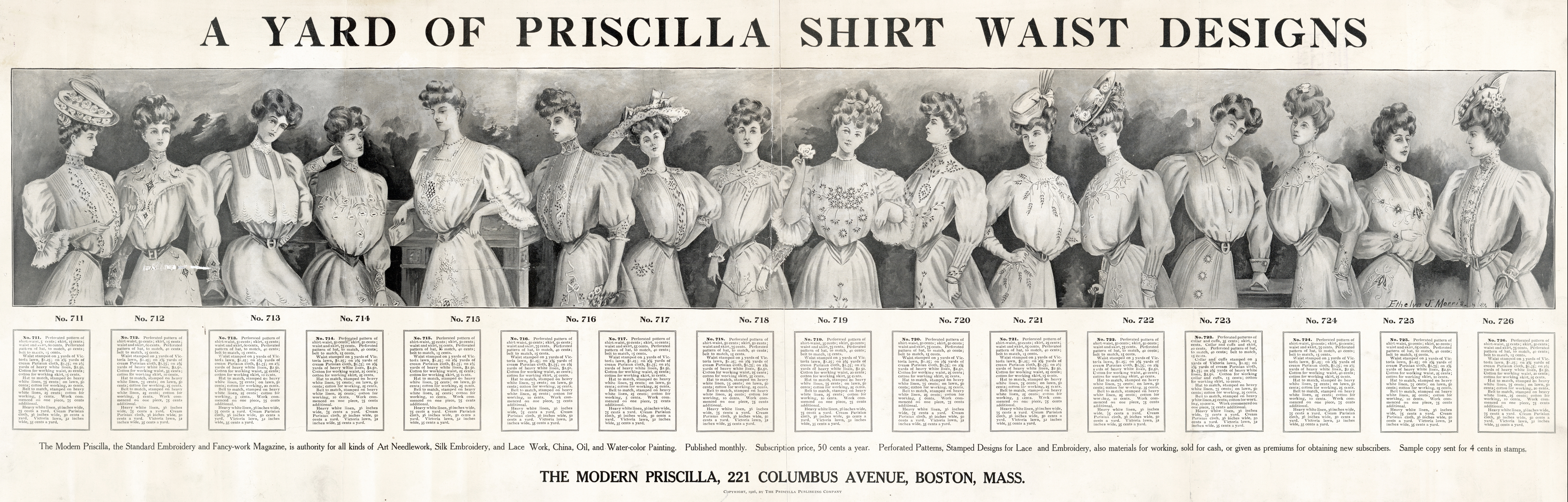
A 1906 advertisement for sewing patterns by The Modern Priscilla, a needlework magazine, showing 16 different designs for shirtwaists, with details about patterns and materials

== See also ==
- Corsage (bodice)
- Triangle Shirtwaist Factory Fire
- New Woman
