= John Larkin (actor, born 1912) =

American actor (1912–1965)

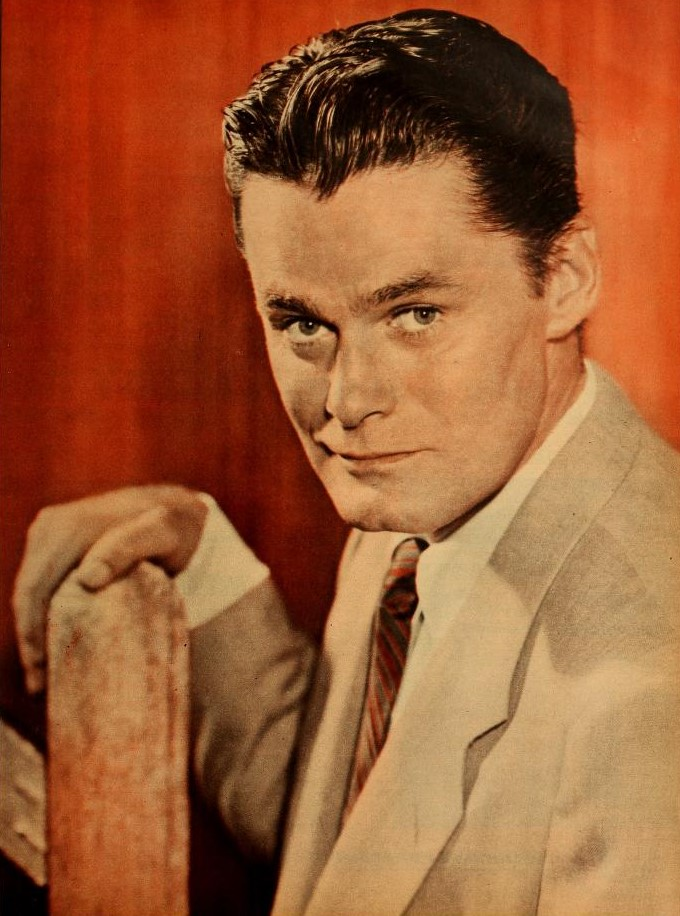
- Larkin in 1953
- Born: April 11, 1912; Oakland, California, U.S.
- Died: January 29, 1965 (aged 52); Studio City, California, U.S.
- Occupation: Actor
- Years active: 1954–1965
- Spouse(s): Genelle Gibbs (1 child); Teri Keane (1950–1961) (divorced) (1 child); Audrey Blum (m. 1961–1965) (2 children)

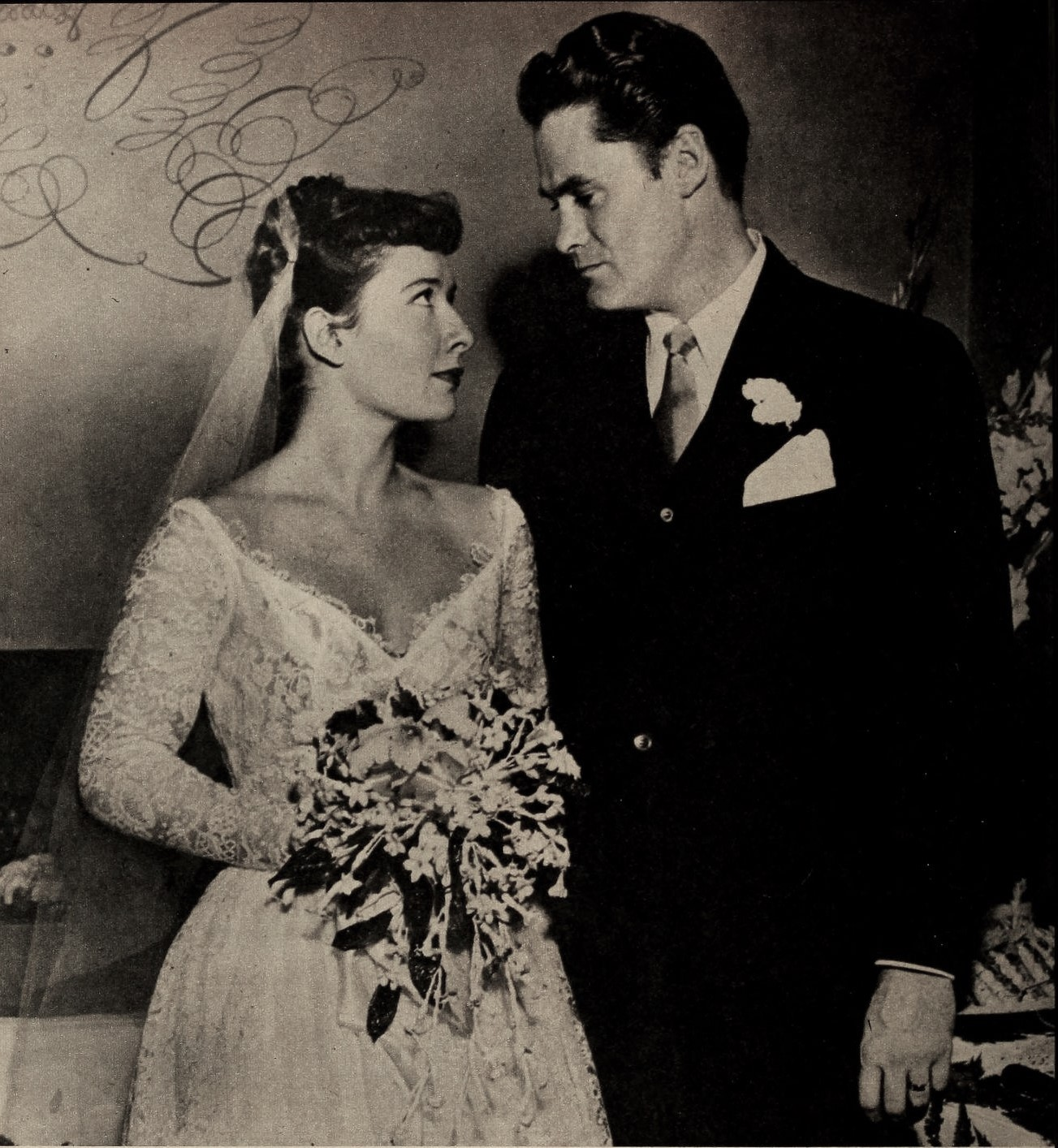
Teri Keane and John Larkin, 1950

John Larkin (April 11, 1912 – January 29, 1965) was an American actor whose nearly 30-year career was capped by his 1950s portrayal of two fictional criminal attorneys – Perry Mason on radio and Mike Karr on television daytime drama The Edge of Night. After having acted in an estimated 7,500 dramatic shows on radio, he devoted his final decade to television and, from April 1962 to January 1965, was a key member of the supporting cast in two prime-time series and made at least twenty major guest-starring appearances in many of the top drama series of the period.

== Radio career and Perry Mason ==
A native of the San Francisco Bay city of Oakland, Larkin acted on radio, the prime entertainment venue in American homes during the Depression 1930s. By the latter part of the decade, when he was in his mid-twenties, Larkin had worked for a number of stations, including KCKN and WHB in the Kansas City Metropolitan Area, where he was an announcer and, later, in Chicago, where he became known for versatility in performing announcing and hosting duties in addition to acting in front of the microphone for numerous scripted shows, including Vic and Sade, one of network radio's most popular programs of the 1930s, and the one for which he received his first major credit as a radio actor.

He also played Frankie McGinnis in the 1935–41 NBC radio soap opera Girl Alone, a role that included some singing. An item in Movie Radio Guide noted, "when the script calls for Frankie to sing, John Larkin does his own singing."

Following military service in World War II (1942-1946), he established himself in the capital city of network radio, New York and was offered, in 1947, the title role in CBS Radio Network's three-and-a-half-year-old afternoon crime serial, Perry Mason which, as was the case with all radio daytime dramas, consisted of an 11-minute script, broadcast Monday through Friday in a 15-minute time slot, including commercials, promos and credits.

Larkin's voice had soon come to symbolize the Perry Mason radio persona and he remained with the role for eight-and-a-half years until the program's conclusion in December 1955. During the show's run, he also continued to perform in radio's numerous primetime dramas — as an example, in May 1948, he was in Lux Radio Theater's version of the 1946 Gary Cooper vehicle Cloak and Dagger (May 3), and Ford Theater's versions of The Front Page (May 9), playing Hildy Johnson, as well as Laura (May 30), in which he voiced police lieutenant McPherson, who falls in love with the portrait of the title character. By the early- to mid-1950s, however, most of radio's entertainment and information programming had already transferred to the new medium of television, with the process reaching its completion at the start of the 1960s.

== Daytime television and The Edge of Night ==
Although Larkin had done some television announcing and isolated acting appearances during the medium's early years, his first sustained work came in the final year of his Perry Mason radio run. Another Procter & Gamble radio soap, The Road of Life, which had been on the air since 1937, had initiated a separate TV version, which premiered on CBS' daytime schedule December 13, 1954. Following the pattern set by radio, much of daytime programming, including all soaps, was structured as 15-minute productions during television's first eight years of full-schedule broadcasting (1948–56). The show's leading characters, Dr. Jim Brent, a surgeon, and his wife, were played by daytime veterans Don MacLaughlin and Virginia Dwyer who also voiced the roles in the radio version. Nine months after the show's cancellation on July 1, 1955, MacLaughlin and one of radio's earlier Perry Masons, Santos Ortega, would spend thirty and twenty years, respectively, on one of daytime's first two half-hour soaps, As the World Turns. John Larkin, as Dr. Brent's friend, Frank Dana, had a medium-sized role amidst the show's large supporting cast, including thirty-year-old Jack Lemmon who, later in the year, would be cast in his Oscar-winning role as Ensign Pulver in Mister Roberts. Larkin played Frank Dana for the first four months of the show's course, with another actor briefly playing the part in subsequent episodes. Road of Life lasted only six-and-a-half months on TV, but continued on radio for another four years, finally ending its twenty-two-year run in 1959.

Larkin remained with Perry Mason until its final episode at the end of the year and was almost immediately offered a continuation of the role on television. Procter & Gamble could not, however, come to terms with Erle Stanley Gardner regarding Perry Mason's position as a daytime TV character and the defense attorney, while remaining with CBS, returned in twenty-one months, on September 21, 1957, as a primetime show, starring Raymond Burr. Daytime's biggest advertiser, however, had another solution, which still permitted Larkin to portray afternoon TV's "Perry Mason" in all but name. Irving Vendig, having scripted the radio Perry Mason for the past nine years, proposed the creation of a late-afternoon daytime drama with basically the same Perry Mason-type scripts, except for the name of the lead criminal lawyer, who would be called Mike Karr. John Larkin thus had his first television leading role, and The Edge of Night, premiering, along with As the World Turns, on Monday, April 2, 1956, ushered in a new era of half-hour soaps to TV, with other daytime dramas eventually expanding to a 30 minutes, then an hour and, ultimately, in one unsuccessful experiment (NBC's Another World) to 90 minutes. The Edge of Night's title was derived from the fact that it aired at the end of the afternoon period, 4:30, a late time slot which had never previously been occupied by a soap.

A forceful and dynamic actor, the 44-year-old Larkin was the dramatic fulcrum of the live show, delivering vividly effective courtroom speeches and presenting human frailty tempered by stalwart determination in the face of the multiple vicissitudes which the plotlines devised for dedicated crime fighter Mike Karr and his eventual wife, Sara Lane, whom Mike married in 1958, at the start of the show's third year. As the storylines began, Mike was a police officer attending law school who, upon passing his bar exam, became an assistant district attorney and, in the course of time, a criminal attorney in private practice. The show was one of the most popular offerings in daytime television and made the middle-aged Larkin something of a sex symbol, receiving sackfuls of fan mail. Producers of prime-time shows had also taken notice, with Larkin receiving inquiries regarding his availability. The Edge of Night, however, which revolved almost entirely around him, required his full attention.

The show's place in its audience's affection was ultimately measured by a widely reported event of Friday, February 17, 1961, when, in the final scene of that day's live episode, Sara ran out of the house after the Karrs' two-year-old, Laurie (played by Victoria Larkin, daughter of John Larkin and his wife, Audrey Blum), had wandered into the street, followed by the sound of screeching tires and an impact. Unseen over the weekend, Sara Karr turned out to have saved Laurie at the cost of her own life, as she lingered in a coma during Monday and Tuesday episodes, finally dying on Wednesday, February 22 and engendering an avalanche of calls to CBS along with thousands of letters (over 2,500 in the first day alone). In a response, unprecedented in the annals of daytime drama, Larkin and the actress who had played Sara, Teal Ames, appeared on-screen following the last scene of the next day's episode, with Ames explaining that she was fine and had simply decided to leave the show in order to pursue other career options. Later that year, John Larkin also arrived at the decision that the time had come for a new career direction which, in his case, meant Hollywood. Mike Karr's final installment, on October 10, had the intrepid lawyer departing for the state capital to organize a crime commission. For the next two months, the plotlines centered around supporting character Ed Gibson, another crime-fighting attorney, played by Larry Hagman, until Mike Karr, now portrayed by Laurence Hugo, returned in mid-December.

== First year in Hollywood and Saints and Sinners ==
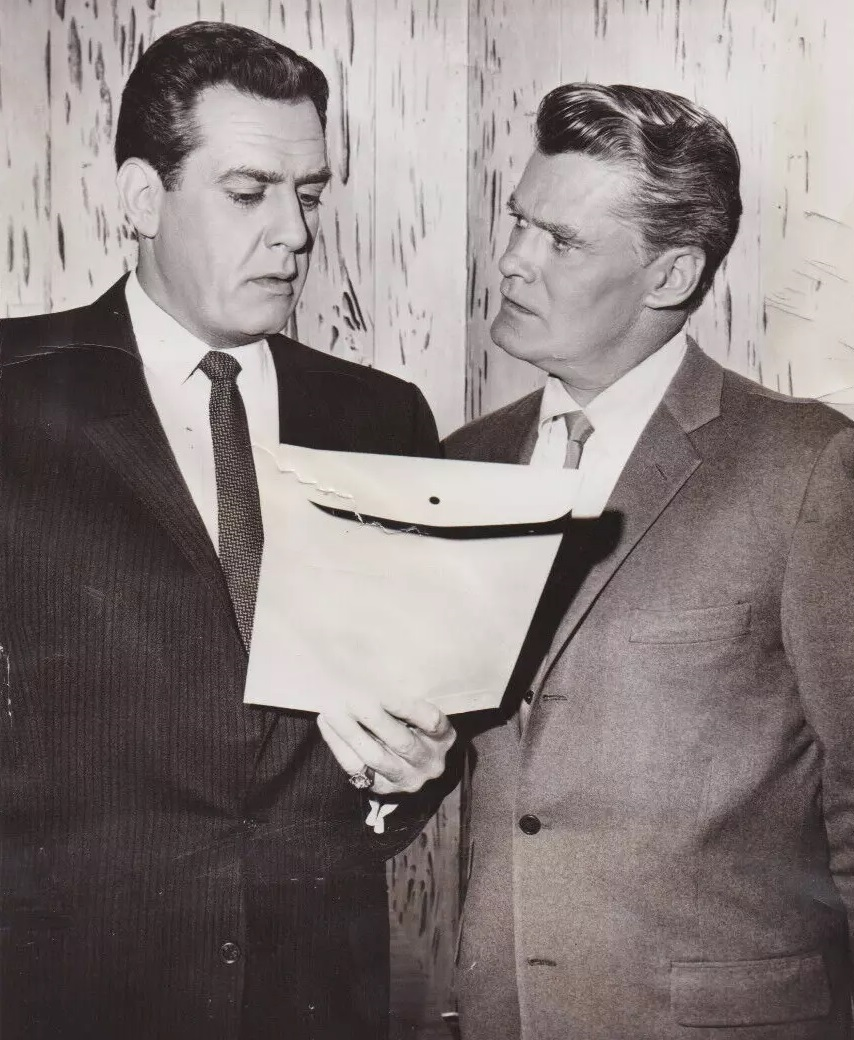
Larkin (right, with Raymond Burr), who played the role of Perry Mason on the CBS Radio series for seven years, made his first guest appearance in the TV series Perry Mason in April 1962.

Although he was born in the San Francisco Bay area, Larkin had spent his entire career in other venues and was now, shortly before his fiftieth birthday, returning to his native state of California. In his remaining three years, he worked continuously, appearing in prime-time TV shows (including four guest-starring roles as four different characters on Raymond Burr's Perry Mason) as well as playing supporting roles in three feature films.

All of Larkin's prime-time appearances were in hour-long dramatic shows, with the first six broadcast within a five-week period in 1962. He was a guest star in the April 24 episode of Leslie Nielsen's police drama The New Breed, followed three days later, on April 27 by a role in The Detectives Starring Robert Taylor. The following day, April 28, he appeared as one of the murder suspects in "The Case of the Counterfeit Crank", the first of his four Perry Masons. Three days later, on May 1, he was seen in the "Savage Sunday" installment of the prestigious anthology series, The Dick Powell Show, which was structured as the pilot episode for his upcoming newspaper series, Saints and Sinners. On May 18, he returned to guest-star in another episode of The Detectives Starring Robert Taylor and, on May 31, appeared in an installment of the highly rated 1920s crime series, The Untouchables. The following months were spent in filming episodes of NBC's Saints and Sinners, starring Nick Adams, who achieved high recognition in his previous series, ABC's half-hour western The Rebel, which ran from 1959 to 1961. Seeking to promote the highly touted Saints and Sinners, NBC showed selected repeat episodes of The Rebel from June to September 1962 as a summer replacement program for The Joey Bishop Show. Monday, September 17, the day Saints and Sinners' premiere episode was scheduled for broadcast in the 8:30–9:30 time slot, John Larkin made an appearance on NBC's afternoon series, Here's Hollywood, which specialized in celebrity interviews and show promotions, talking about his career and his hopes for the new venture.

A hard-hitting drama which focused on human-interest stories appearing in the fictional newspaper, New York Bulletin, Saints and Sinners posited Nick Adams as impetuous and emotional reporter Nick Alexander who wore his heart on his sleeve, and John Larkin as his mentor, the wise and understanding city editor Mark Grainger, a veteran newspaperman who had seen it all. A particularly noteworthy episode, "A Shame for the Diamond Wedding", written by Ernest Kinoy and broadcast on November 26, 1962, guest-starred Oscar winner Paul Muni in his final acting role as a feisty ninety-year-old (Muni was 67 at the time) who files for divorce from his eighty-eight-year-old wife (played by Lili Darvas) to refocus the priorities of his venal and short-sighted children and in-laws to the true meaning of life. "New Lead Berlin", the 17th and final episode of the series, shown on January 28, 1963, spotlighted John Larkin in a dual role, as Mark Grainger confronted his lookalike, Bartley King. Ultimately, despite respectful critical notices and devoted viewing from a measurable segment of the audience, the drama could not overcome the competition from CBS' top-rated sitcoms The Lucy Show and The Danny Thomas Show and ABC's western, The Rifleman, with the two-hour slot, which included Saints and Sinners' 7:30–8:30 lead-in, It's a Man's World, filled the following week by NBC Monday Night at the Movies.

== Guest appearances and feature films in 1963–64 ==
1963 was another busy year for Larkin, with nine guest appearances plus the final four installments of Saints and Sinners. In early January, he was seen on three consecutive days, with the first two occurring on TV's most popular western series, Gunsmoke and Bonanza, followed by the Monday, January 7 episode of Saints and Sinners. The Saturday, January 5 Gunsmoke installment, "Louie Pheeters", spotlighted him as cunning murderer Murph Moody, while on Sunday, January 6, he had what may be considered the finest acting assignment of his guest-starring career—the title role in the Bonanza episode, "The Colonel". The central character is Frank Medford, a friend of Ben Cartwright from his youthful days, who arrives in Virginia City, presenting himself as a successful businessman and charms all the ladies, especially the still-attractive, prosperous widow, Emily Colfax, played by Helen Westcott. A charismatic, larger-than-life personality, who is ultimately exposed as a fraud, but one with his heart in the right place, Larkin's "Colonel" dominates the episode and his portrayal may be among the most memorable in the show's history.

The remaining seven guest shots were on February 26, in another installment of The Dick Powell Show, then March 12, in another Untouchables, followed by "The Case of the Greek Goddess", the April 18 episode of Perry Mason in which, as sculptor John Kenyon, he is exonerated by Raymond Burr's Mason of murdering his Greek model's hostile mother. He was next seen five days later, on April 23, in yet another Dick Powell, followed by "Dear Uncle George", the May 10 episode of The Alfred Hitchcock Hour. The year's last two appearances came in episodes of the 1963–64 season, with yet another Mason, "The Case of the Reluctant Model" (in which he is again a murder suspect) broadcast on October 31, and an episode of The Fugitive, seen on November 12.

Finally, 1964 ushered in five more guest-starring roles, a second series, and three feature films, which represent John Larkin's entire career on the theatrical screen. "Better Than a Dead Lion", the January 20 episode of the psychiatric series Breaking Point, marked his first performance in the new year, followed by the February 7 broadcast of "The Evil of Adelaide Winters", another installment of Hitchcock. February 12 saw the release of the Rod Serling-scripted film, Seven Days in May, directed by John Frankenheimer. The political drama about a planned military takeover of the U.S. Government, was filmed during the final months of the Kennedy administration and starred Burt Lancaster as the chief plotter, General Scott, with an unbilled John Larkin appearing in two scenes as one of his co-conspirators, Colonel Broderick. Then, on March 9, came "The Duncan McIvor Story", an episode from Wagon Train's season of 90-minute color episodes, with Ron Hayes as the title character, an army lieutenant, and Larkin, playing yet another colonel, as his superior.

The final two guest shots were seen during the 1964–65 season. Larkin's fourth Mason episode, "The Case of the Betrayed Bride", was his last and, once again presented him as a murder suspect. At the end, on December 31, there was an episode of Kraft Suspense Theatre, "The Wine-Dark Sea". Each of the two feature films, lensed between April and October, gave him three scenes with some well-defined medium shots. Walt Disney's family drama, Those Calloways, directed by Norman Tokar, billed him eighth, behind Brian Keith, Vera Miles, Brandon deWilde, Walter Brennan, Ed Wynn, Linda Evans and Philip Abbott. Playing Linda Evans' father, a wise and compassionate small-town shopkeeper, he provided supportive advice to his daughter and the object of her affection, played by Brandon deWilde. The other feature, The Satan Bug, a doomsday thriller about the theft from a bacteriological lab of a deadly virus capable of causing immense casualties, was directed by John Sturges and scripted by James Clavell from the novel by Alistair MacLean. Larkin, playing a government scientist received fifth billing, after George Maharis, Richard Basehart, Anne Francis and Dana Andrews. His longest scene comes at midpoint and consists of a detailed explanation of the danger posed by the "bug".

== Final work on Twelve O'Clock High and death ==
John Larkin's last work came in filming episodes for his second series, ABC's Twelve O'Clock High. True to pattern, he was, once again, cast as an authority figure, the stern yet humane Major General Wiley Crowe, the supervising commander of strategic bombing crews, relaying orders to Frank Savage, the youthful Brigadier General in direct charge of the missions. Although the Quinn Martin production was based on the 1949 film in which Gregory Peck portrayed General Savage, Larkin's character was originated for the series. Quinn Martin, who used Larkin in two of the series he produced, The Untouchables and The Fugitive, provided strong dramatic confrontations between the top-billed Lansing, whose General Savage held a delicate balance between personal concern for his men and the responsibilities of command decision, and second-billed Larkin, himself a World War II veteran, who imbued General Crowe with the palpable comprehension of the heavy burden incumbent in relaying life-and-death orders from the top. Filming of the first episodes began in May 1964 and the premiere episode was broadcast on Friday, September 18, in the 9:30–10:30 time slot. A few of the episodes placed Larkin at the center of dramatic conflict, particularly "The Climate of Doubt" (October 23), in which General Crowe faces a board of inquiry for a risky strategy intended to aid the French Resistance. At the time of his death on January 29, the day episode 19 was broadcast, Larkin was in the midst of filming the 25th episode of the 32 scheduled for the season. He continued to be seen until the installment of March 19, with the remaining seven episodes featuring generals portrayed by John Zaremba, Paul Newlan and Lin McCarthy.

John Larkin died at Valley Doctor's Hospital in North Hollywood after being stricken with a heart attack at his home. He had a daughter, Cathleen, from his first marriage and another daughter, Sharon, from his second marriage, on June 10, 1950, to future Edge of Night actress Teri Keane, who, after his departure from the series, spent eleven years (1964–75) as a member of the cast. In addition to his daughter Victoria, he and his third wife, Audrey, were also the parents of a son, John Jr.

The last two films on which John Larkin received billing, Those Calloways and The Satan Bug, both premiered in New York on April 14, 1965, three days after what would have been his 53rd birthday.

== Selected filmography ==
- The Alfred Hitchcock Hour (1963) (Season 1 Episode 30: "Dear Uncle George") as Simon Aldritch
- The Alfred Hitchcock Hour (1964) (Season 2 Episode 16: "The Evil of Adelaide Winters") as Edward Porter

== Sources ==
- Brooks, Tim (1987). The Complete Directory to Prime Time TV Stars 1946—Present. New York: Ballantine Books. ISBN 0-345-32681-4.
