= Rags Ragland =

American actor (1905–1946)

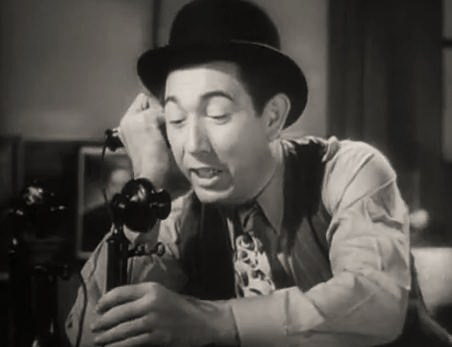
- Ragland in the trailer for Ringside Maisie (1941)
- Born: John Lee Morgan Beauregard Ragland; August 23, 1905; Louisville, Kentucky, U.S.
- Died: August 20, 1946 (aged 40); Los Angeles, California, U.S.
- Occupations: Actor; comedian
- Years active: 1935–1946
- Spouse: Sabina E. Vanover (div. 1926)
- Children: 1

Rags Ragland (born John Lee Morgan Beauregard Ragland; August 23, 1905 – August 20, 1946) was an American comedian and character actor.

== Personal life ==
Ragland was born on August 23, 1905, in Louisville, Kentucky, to parents Adam Joseph Ragland and Stella Petty.

As a youth, he worked as a truck driver, boxer, and movie projectionist in Kentucky. He was briefly married to Sabina Elizabeth Vanover and they had one child, a son named John Griffin Ragland (1925–1990), before they divorced in 1926. The following year, at the age of 22, Ragland moved to Los Angeles.

== Career ==
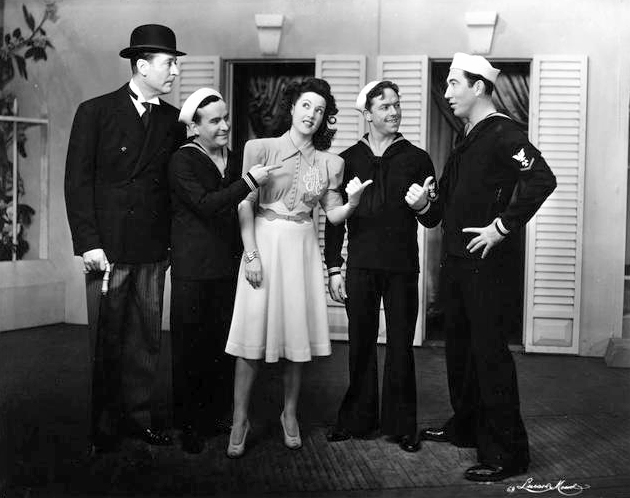
Arthur Treacher, Pat Harrington, Ethel Merman, Frank Hyers and Ragland in the original Broadway production of Panama Hattie (1940)

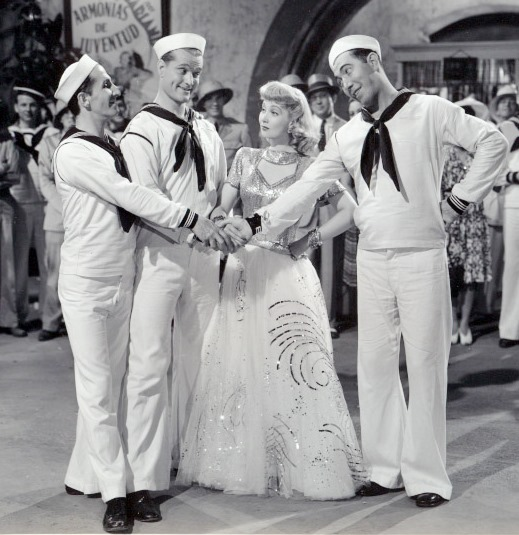
Ragland (right) with Ben Blue, Red Skelton and Ann Sothern in the film Panama Hattie (1942)

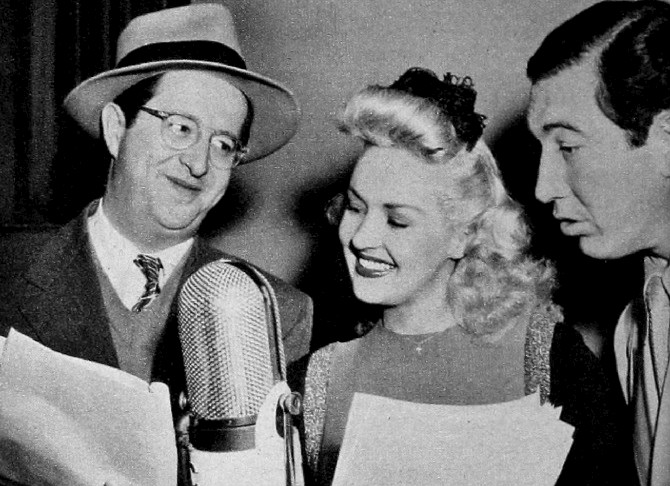
Phil Silvers, Betty Grable and Ragland on the Armed Forces Radio program Mail Call (1943)

Ragland made his show business reputation in burlesque. He quickly became known for his wild ad-libs, unpredictable intrusions into other comics' acts, and a "healthy off-stage libido". Eventually he worked his way up to "top banana" at Minsky's, the dominant burlesque house.

Minsky striptease star Georgia Sothern remembered him fondly in her 1971 memoir, saying she considered Ragland a close friend and the funniest comedian the Minskys had ever produced. His longtime performing partner Phil Silvers referred to Ragland in his autobiography as "my favorite comic".

After classic burlesque died, Ragland transitioned to Broadway and films. He was typically cast as good-natured oafs with a knack for fracturing the English language. In 1941, he became a Metro-Goldwyn-Mayer contract player beginning with Ringside Maisie. He appeared in several MGM light comedies and musicals and he gained popularity as Red Skelton's cohort in the "Whistling" movie series (Whistling in the Dark (1941), Whistling in Dixie (1942) and Whistling in Brooklyn (1943)). Ragland's final film appearance was in the drama The Hoodlum Saint (1946).

== Death ==
After returning from an alcoholic bender with Orson Welles in Mexico in 1946, Ragland was scheduled to revive his New York nightclub act with friend Phil Silvers at the Copacabana. He began experiencing abdominal pain and was hospitalized. Good friend Frank Sinatra called in a specialist, but the doctors determined that Ragland's liver and kidneys had been destroyed by years of alcohol abuse. After falling into a coma, he died three days before his 41st birthday of uremia. Silvers and Sinatra were by his bedside. Many Hollywood celebrities attended Ragland's funeral; Sinatra sang at the service and Silvers delivered the eulogy.

In a gesture of friendship and respect, Sinatra left the set of his movie It Happened in Brooklyn, flew to New York, and unexpectedly showed up to take Ragland's spot with Silvers at the Copacabana debut. (Silvers had decided to continue because he had signed a contract stating "the show must go on".) Sinatra and Silvers did the routines they had performed during their USO tours. The performance rocked the house. As it came to a close, Silvers cried and said, "May I take a bow for Rags." While Silvers was crying in remembrance of Ragland, the audience was silent.

== Complete filmography ==
- A Midsummer Night's Dream (1935) as Acting Troupe Member (uncredited)
- Hats and Dogs (1938, Short)
- Ringside Maisie (1941) as Vic
- Whistling in the Dark (1941) as Sylvester Conway
- Born to Sing (1942) as Grunt
- Sunday Punch (1942) as "Killer" Connolly
- Maisie Gets Her Man (1942) as Ears Cofflin
- Somewhere I'll Find You (1942) as Charlie, the Masseur (uncredited)
- The War Against Mrs. Hadley (1942) as Louie
- Panama Hattie (1942) as "Rags"
- Whistling in Dixie (1942) as Sylvester 'Lester' Conway
- Du Barry Was a Lady (1943) as Charlie
- Girl Crazy (1943) as 'Rags'
- Whistling in Brooklyn (1943) as Chester Conway
- 3 Men in White (1944) as Hobart Genet
- Meet the People (1944) as Mr. Smith
- The Canterville Ghost (1944) as Big Harry
- Anchors Aweigh (1945) as Police Sergeant
- Her Highness and the Bellboy (1945) as Albert Weever
- Bud Abbott and Lou Costello in Hollywood (1945) as Himself
- The Hoodlum Saint (1946) as Fishface (final film role)
