= Teri Keane =

American actress (1925–2022)

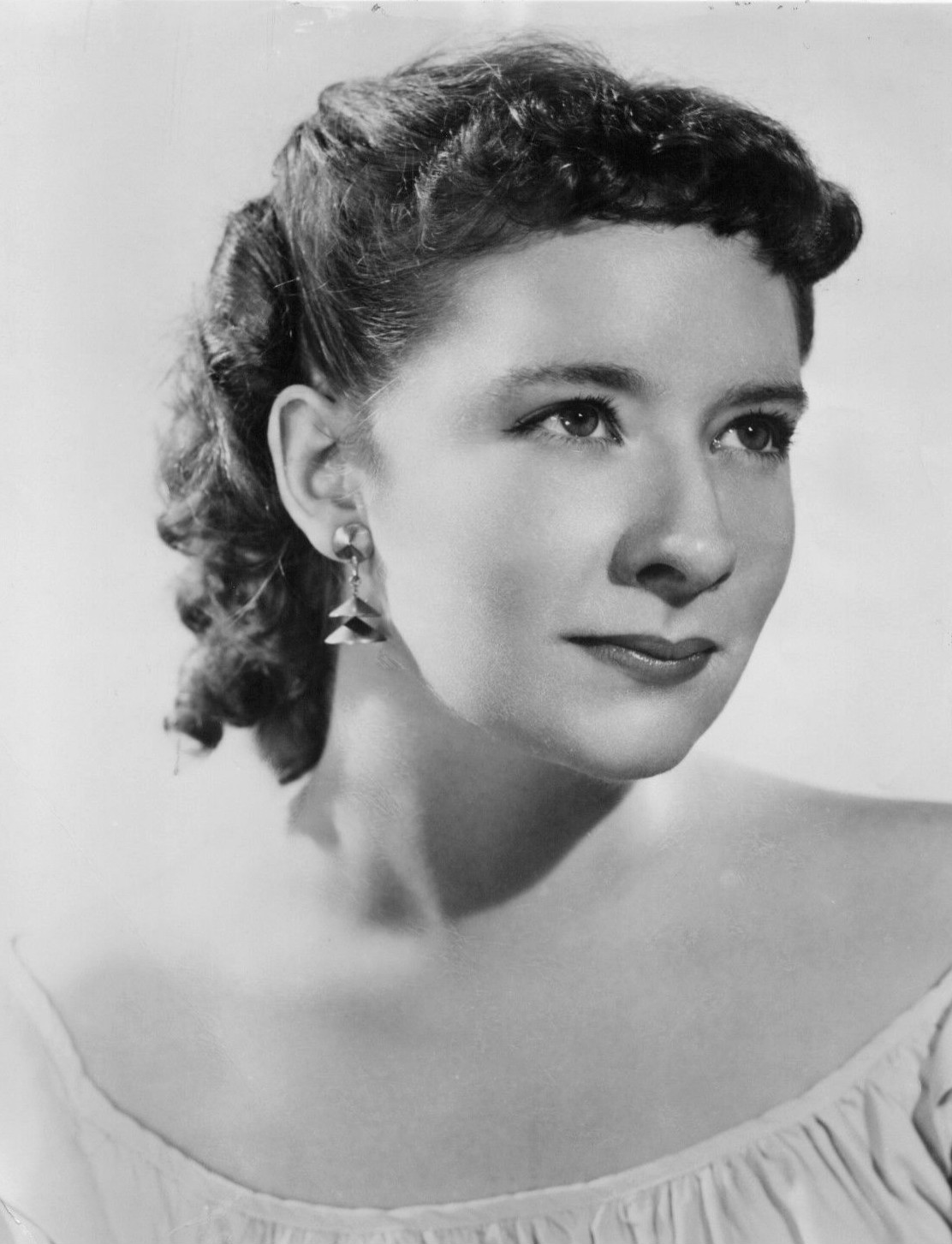
- Keane in 1949
- Born: Teri Louisa Keane; October 24, 1925; Manhattan, New York City, U.S.
- Died: November 17, 2022 (aged 97)
- Occupation: Actress
- Known for: Radio soap operas
- Spouse: John Larkin (m. 1950; div. 1961)
- Children: 1

Teri Louisa Keane (October 24, 1925 – November 17, 2022) was an American actress known for her work in the era of old-time radio. She was reported to have "appeared in more than 100 dramatic roles in radio and television." For a twelve-year period, from Oct 1963 to April 4, 1975, she played Martha Spears Marceau, the wife of police chief Bill Marceau on the CBS-TV daytime drama The Edge of Night.

== Early years ==
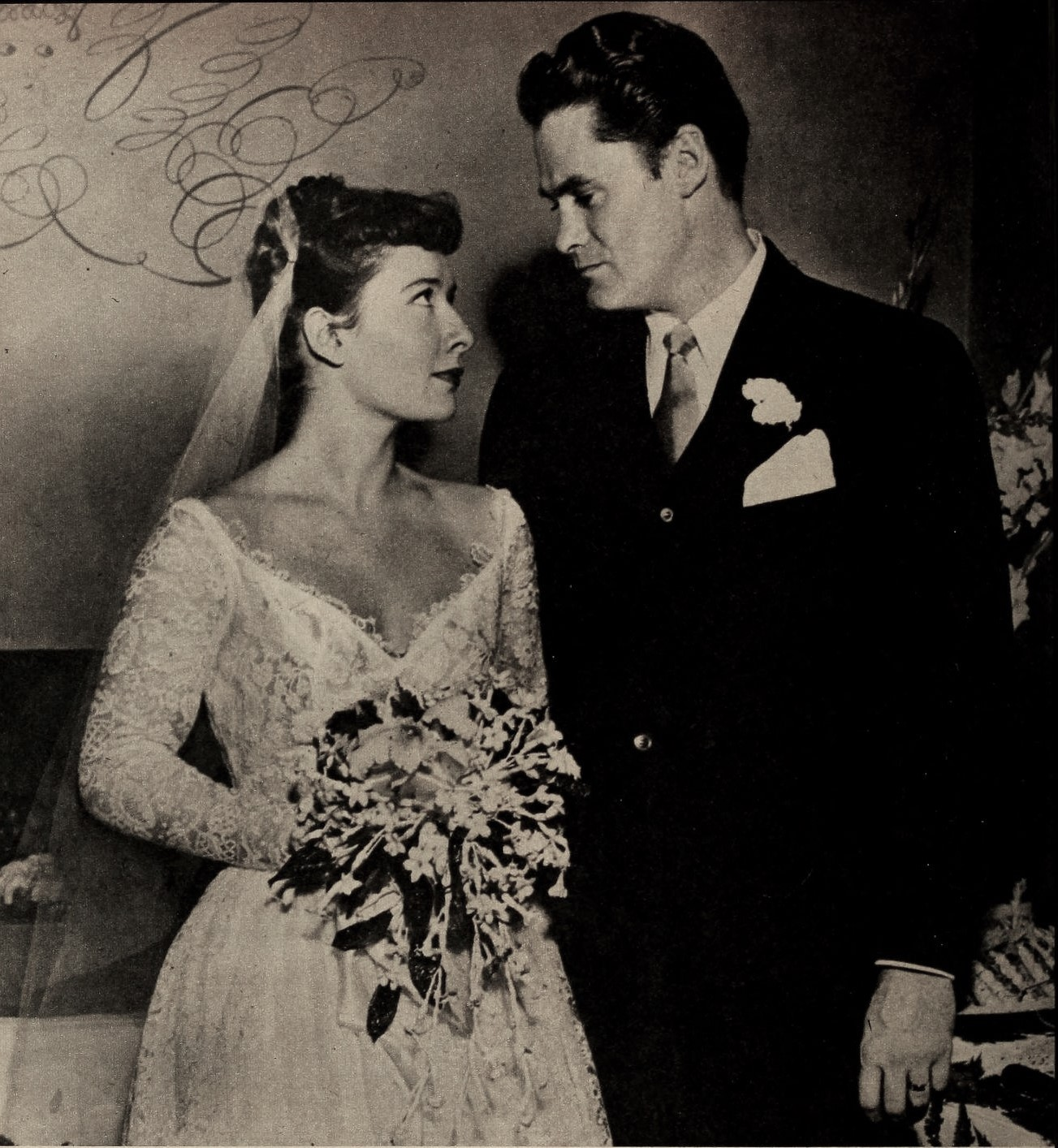
Teri Keane and John Larkin, 1950

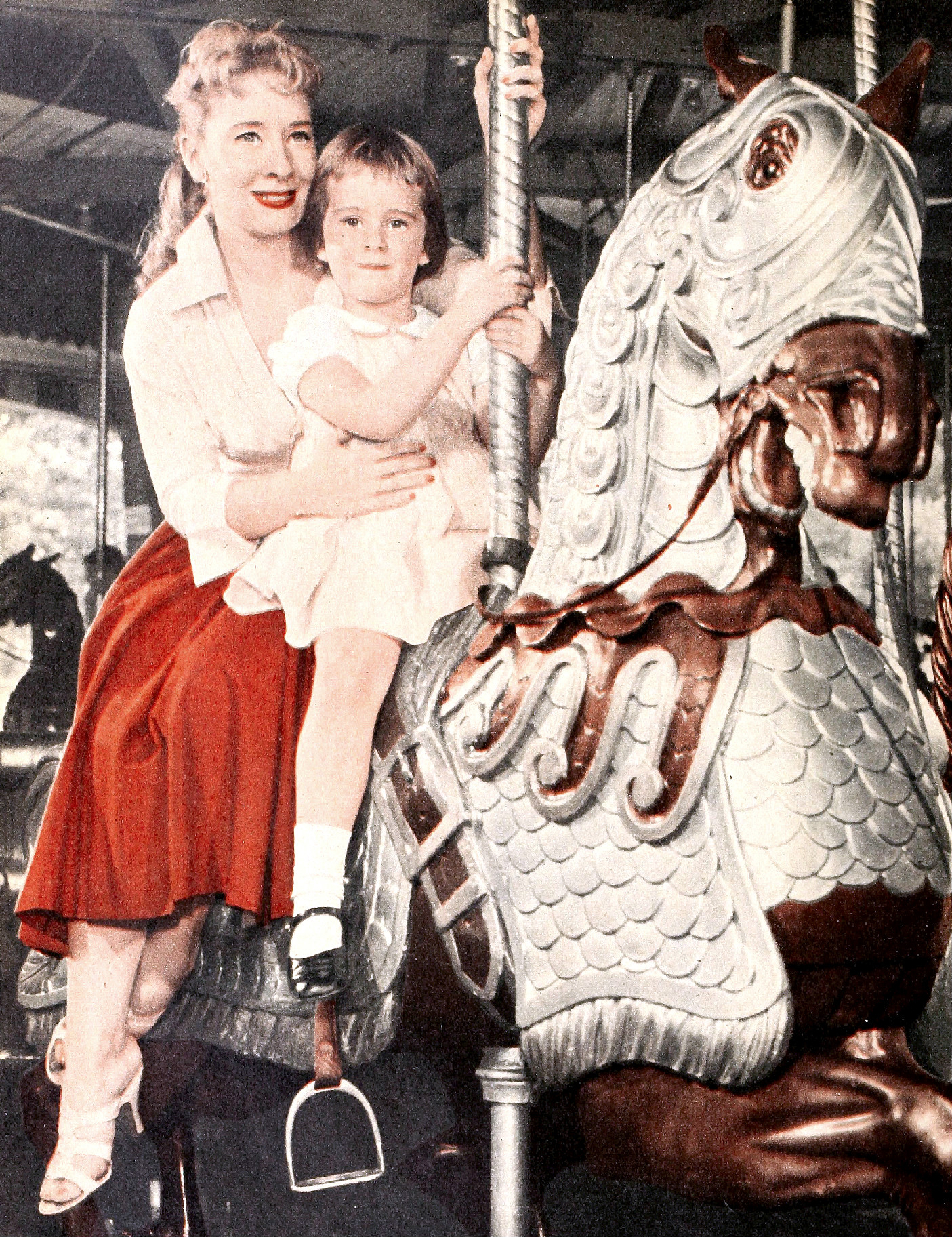
Teri Keane and her daughter in 1954

Keane was born in Manhattan. Her father was a newspaperman, at one time an editor of The New York Globe, and her mother was "the leading coloratura" at the Hungarian Royal Opera House in Budapest, who later became a professor of music at Wittenberg College. She attended the Professional Children's School in Manhattan.

Keane's acting career began when she was 9 years old. "By the time I was 19," she told a reporter for a story in the November 1954 issue of TV-Radio Mirror, "I had played dramatic roles in five Broadway shows and was already a radio veteran."

== Radio ==
Keane's roles on radio programs included those shown in the table below among others.

Program	Role
Big Sister	Hope Melton Evans
Life Can Be Beautiful	Chichi
Marriage for Two	Vikki
Mystery Without Murder	Secretary
Road of Life	Jocelyn Brent
The Romance of Helen Trent	Carol Bancroft
The Second Mrs. Burton	Terry Burton

Keane was also a member of the casts of Mr. Mercury, Just Plain Bill,, and Somerset Maugham Theater. In the 1970s, she was heard on CBS Radio Mystery Theater.

== Stage ==
Keane's Broadway credits include Hairpin Harmony, The Vagabond King, Swing Your Lady, and What a Life.

== Television ==
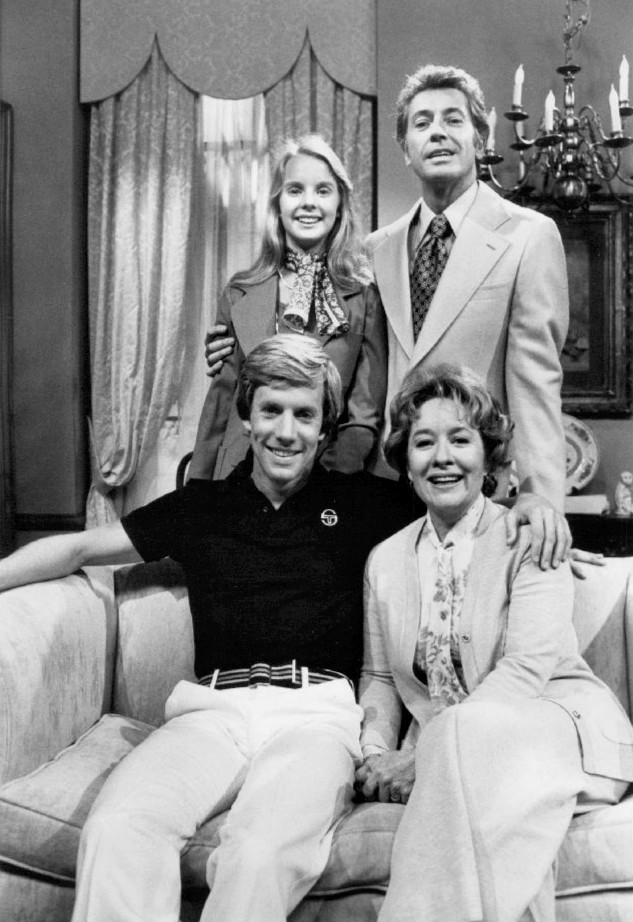
Cast photo from the daytime drama One Life to Live. Back, from left: Julie Montgomery, Farley Granger. Front, from left: Jameson Parker, Teri Keane.

Keane's roles on television programs included those shown in the table below.

Program	Role
The Edge of Night	Martha Spears Marceau
One Life to Live	Naomi Vernon
Loving	Rose Donovan #1

Keane also appeared on Young Doctor Malone (1963), Kitty Foyle (1958), The Inner Flame (1955), The Road of Life (1954), All My Children (1979), Ryan’s Hope (1985), Guiding Light (1957, 1988), Search for Tomorrow (1956, 1980), As the World Turns (1961–1963), and American Inventory.

== Personal life and death ==
Keane married radio and television actor John Larkin on June 10, 1950, in Englewood, New Jersey. They had a daughter, Sharon, born March 5, 1951.

Keane died on November 17, 2022, at the age of 97.
