= Whistling in Dixie =

1942 film by S. Sylvan Simon

- Directed by: S. Sylvan Simon
- Written by: Nat Perrin; Wilkie C. Mahoney (additional dialogue, as Wilkie Mahoney); Lawrence Hazard (uncredited); Jonathan Latimer (uncredited)
- Produced by: George Haight
- Starring: Red Skelton; Ann Rutherford; George Bancroft; Guy Kibbee
- Cinematography: Clyde De Vinna
- Edited by: Frank Sullivan
- Music by: Lennie Hayton
- Production company: Metro-Goldwyn-Mayer
- Distributed by: Loew's, Inc.
- Release date: December 1942
- Running time: 74 minutes
- Country: United States
- Language: English
- Budget: $388,000
- Box office: $1,345,000

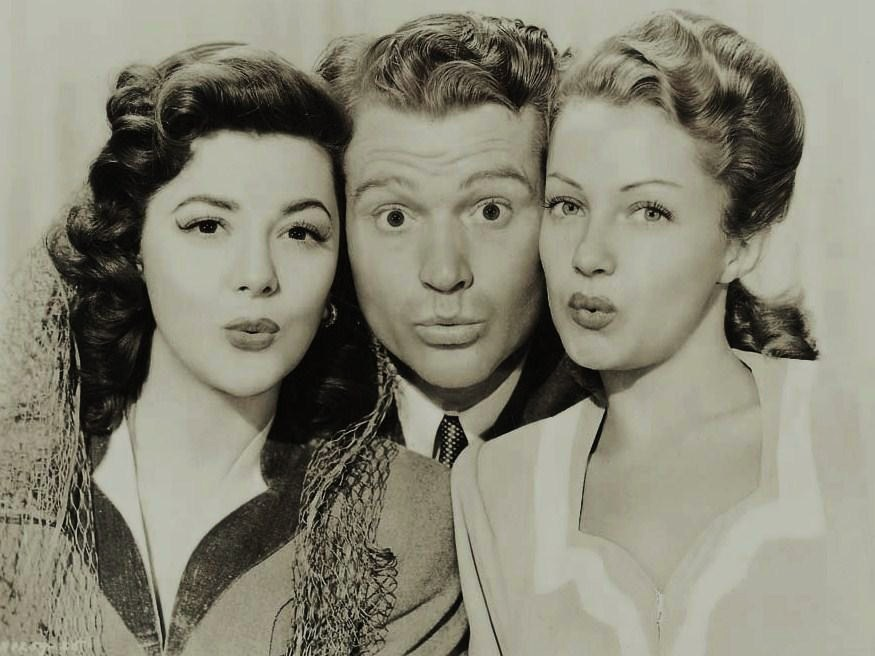
L-R: Ann Rutherford, Red Skelton, and Diana Lewis

Whistling in Dixie is a 1942 American crime comedy film, the second of three starring Red Skelton as radio detective and amateur crime solver Wally Benton (also known as The Fox) and Ann Rutherford as his fiancée. The pair are called upon to solve a crime in the Southern United States. The film also re-introduces Rags Ragland, playing dual roles as twins, the mostly-reformed Chester, as well as his villainous brother from the first film. The film turns into a romantic comedy mystery, complete with death traps, corrupt politicians and lost gold, ending with a frenetic fight at the end between Wally Benton and both of Rags Ragland's characters.

The film is a sequel to Whistling in the Dark and is followed by Whistling in Brooklyn.

== Cast ==
- Red Skelton as Wally "The Fox" Benton
- Ann Rutherford as Carol Lambert
- George Bancroft as Sheriff Claude Stagg
- Guy Kibbee as Judge George Lee
- Diana Lewis as Ellamae Downs
- Peter Whitney as Frank V. Bailie
- Rags Ragland as Chester Conway
- Celia Travers as Hattie Lee
- Lucien Littlefield as Corporal Lucken
- Louis Mason as Deputy Lem
- Mark Daniels as Martin Gordon
- Pierre Watkin as Doctor
- Emmett Vogan as Radio Producer
- Hobart Cavanaugh as Mr. Panky

== Reception ==
According to MGM records the film earned $1,066,000 in the US and Canada and $279,000 elsewhere, making a profit of $542,000.
