= Tennessee Jed =

American radio children's Western adventure series (1945–1947)

Tennessee Jed is an American children's Western adventure radio program that was broadcast from May 14, 1945, through November 7, 1947. It debuted on Mutual but for most of its time on the air it was on ABC.

== Premise ==
Jed Sloan, known as Tennessee Jed, moved from the Civil War in the Old South to make a fresh start on the American frontier. Jed's marksmanship with his squirrel gun was highlighted in the opening of each episode. A voice said, "There he goes, Tennessee! Get Him!" Then the sound effect of a gunshot was followed by, "Got him! Deeeeeeeeeaaaaaaad center!" Jed also carried a pair of sixguns as he rode his horse, Smoky. Jed eventually began to capture outlaws on direct assignments from President Grant Jed's Tennessee-hills background and his "native love for folk music and a natural musical ability" led to inclusion of music in the program as he accompanied himself on a guitar while singing familiar Western songs and sometimes "put dialogue to music".

== Cast ==
Cast of Tennessee Jed
Character	Actor(s)
Tennessee Jed	Johnny Thomas; Don MacLaughlin
Sheriff Jackson	Jeff Chandler; Humphrey Davis
Deputy	Court Benson; Jim Boles
Masters (gambler)	Raymond Edward Johnson

Supporting actors included John McGovern, George Petrie, and Barton Yarborough. Announcers included Benson, Layman Cameron, and Larry Elliott.

== Schedule ==
Tennessee Jed was a late-afternoon program intended for a juvenile audience. It was on the Mutual network from May 14, 1945, through August 17, 1945. A longer run began on ABC on September 3, 1945. The show stayed on ABC until it ended on November 7, 1947.

== Production ==
Paul DeFur was the producer, and Bill Hamilton was the director. Elton Britt sang the theme. The writers were Ashley Buck, Howard Carraway, and Tom Taggert. The program was initially broadcast via transcription, with live performances beginning in September 1945.

Ward Baking Company was the primary sponsor of Tennessee Jed, promoting its Tip Top Bread. Other companies sponsored the program in areas (such as the West Coast) in which Ward's products were not distributed. Safeway was a major sponsor in the non-Ward areas. An initial report about the cancellation of Tennessee Jed said that Ward was cutting its budget because of a shortage of grain. The trade publication Sponsor noted an additional factor as it reported, "... also because there is a growing feeling among sponsors that unless a children's program reaches the mothers at the same time as the youngsters, advertising doesn't pay off. Jed hasn't been reaching them."

== Promotion ==
In the fall of 1946, Ward and the sponsors of the other three programs in ABC's 5 to 6 p.m. Eastern Time slot joined in a promotional contest that the trade publication Billboard reported was "believed to be the first of its kind in radio". The other programs and their sponsors were Terry and the Pirates (Quaker Oats Company), Sky King (Derby Foods, Incorporated), and Jack Armstrong (General Mills, Incorporated). ABC contributed $15,000 for the promotion, and the sponsors combined to provide $30,000 for it. In addition to promoting the contest on the air, ABC ran a one-third page ad about it in two syndicated newspaper comics sections.

Each participant in the contest, which was limited to age 16 or younger, had to submit a letter completing (in 50 or fewer words) the sentence "I prefer (name of program) because ..." Prizes were

- 100 Huffman bicycles
- 100 Gruen wristwatches
- 100 Philco radios
- 100 Uniflash cameras
- 100 Don Budge tennis racquets
- 500 Wearever Zenith pen and pencil sets.

Listeners submitted 298,694 entries in the contest. Winners were announced the week of January 13, 1947. While the contest was in progress, the number of listeners for the four programs increased, but after it ended audiences for the shows returned to their previous numbers.
