= The Hoodlum Saint =

1946 film by Norman Taurog

- Directed by: Norman Taurog
- Written by: James Hill; Frank Wead; Frances Marion
- Produced by: Cliff Reid
- Starring: William Powell; Esther Williams; Angela Lansbury
- Cinematography: Ray June
- Edited by: Ferris Webster
- Music by: Nathaniel Shilkret
- Production company: Metro-Goldwyn-Mayer
- Distributed by: Loew's Inc.
- Release date: April 4, 1946
- Running time: 91 minutes
- Country: United States
- Language: English
- Budget: $1,918,000
- Box office: $1,569,000

The Hoodlum Saint is a 1946 American drama film directed by Norman Taurog and starring William Powell, Esther Williams and Angela Lansbury.

== Plot ==
Major Terry O'Neill (William Powell) returns to Baltimore in 1919, after the end of World War I, expecting to get his old newspaper night editor job back. However, the paper has recently changed owners, the job has been filled, and his friend and former editor, Allan Smith (an uncredited Will Wright), has been told to cut costs. Disillusioned, Terry decides to abandon his ideals and make his fortune by whatever means necessary. Leaving the building, he runs into two less-than-savory friends, "Fishface" (Rags Ragland) and "Three Finger" (Frank McHugh). When the pair are arrested for bookmaking, it takes all his money to pay their fines and that of "Snarp" (James Gleason).

He crashes a high society wedding party in the hope of meeting businessman Lewis J. Malbery (Henry O'Neill). When a guard insists on seeing his invitation, Terry grabs guest Kay Lorrison (Esther Williams) and kisses her, much to her surprise. After the guard goes away, she slaps Terry in the face, but after his honest confession, begins to warm to him. She introduces him to her uncle, publisher Joe Lorrison (Charles Trowbridge). Terry impresses him with his ideas on how to fight a bitter foe – none other than Malbery – and lands a job. He and Kay, who works on occasion at the paper, develop a relationship.

After masterminding a skillful newspaper campaign against Malbery, Terry surprises his boss by quitting his relatively low-paying job to go to work for Malbery in New York. Snarp, Fishface, Three Finger and "Eel" (Slim Summerville) tag along and open a pool room. When after three years, Malbery promotes him to executive vice president of the company, he returns to Baltimore to see Kay. He finds her once again at a wedding. To his dismay, however, she informs him that this time she is the bride. Nightclub singer "Dusty" Millard (Angela Lansbury) gets him on the rebound.

After a while, Terry crosses paths with Kay once more. She is a widow, and interested in picking up where they left off. Dusty gives up, realizing she has no chance against her rival. However, Kay learns that Terry has become hard and cynical. When Snarp's bookmaking operation was uncovered, his disreputable pals appealed to Terry; he secretly had Snarp freed, but saw to it that his good fortune was attributed to Saint Dismas.

Terry loses everything in the Wall Street crash of 1929. Nearly all his friends and associates, who invested in the stock market on his advice, make him a scapegoat. The only exceptions are Snarp and Dusty. A reformed Snarp tries to get Terry to put his faith in Saint Dismas, without success. Dusty offers Terry an expensive bracelet he once gave her, but he turns her down. Embittered by the rejection, she takes over a charity Snarp set up dedicated to Saint Dismas, intending to steal the donations and place the blame on Terry.

When Terry leaves town on business, he falls ill and is cared for by Father Nolan (Lewis Stone). Snarp comes to see him to tell him what Dusty and their old associates are doing. Then a concerned Kay shows up. Terry drives into town to plead with Dusty to return the money. Dusty and the others are unmoved at first, but when they see how sincere he is, Dusty gives it all back, and more.

== Cast ==
- William Powell as Terry O'Neill
- Esther Williams as Kay Lorrison
- Angela Lansbury as "Dusty" Millard (singing voice dubbed by Doreen Tryden)
- James Gleason as "Snarp"
- Lewis Stone as Father Nolan
- Rags Ragland as "Fishface"
- Frank McHugh as "Three Finger"
- Slim Summerville as "Eel"
- Roman Bohnen as Father O'Doul
- Charles Arnt as O'Neill's Secretary
- Louis Jean Heydt as Mike Flaherty
- Charles Trowbridge as Uncle Joe Lorrison
- Henry O'Neill as Lewis J. Malbery
- William "Bill" Phillips as Dave Fernby
- Matt Moore as Father Duffy
- Trevor Bardette as Rabbi Meyerberg
- Addison Richards as Rev. Miller
- Tom Dugan as Buggsy
- Emma Dunn as Maggie
- Mary Gordon as Trina
- Charles D. Brown as Ed Collner

== Production ==
The film was announced in 1943. It was based on the life of Dempster MacMurphy a Chicago newspaper executive who engaged in philanthropy under the name of St Dismas. Casey Robinson was signed to write the script. Rev Edward Dowling was hired as a consultant. Eventually Frank Wead was assigned to the script.

== Reception ==
The film received mixed to negative reviews. According to MGM records the film made $1,156,000 in the US and Canada and $413,000 elsewhere, resulting in a loss of $918,000.
