= The Happy Journey to Trenton and Camden =

Play by Thornton Wilder

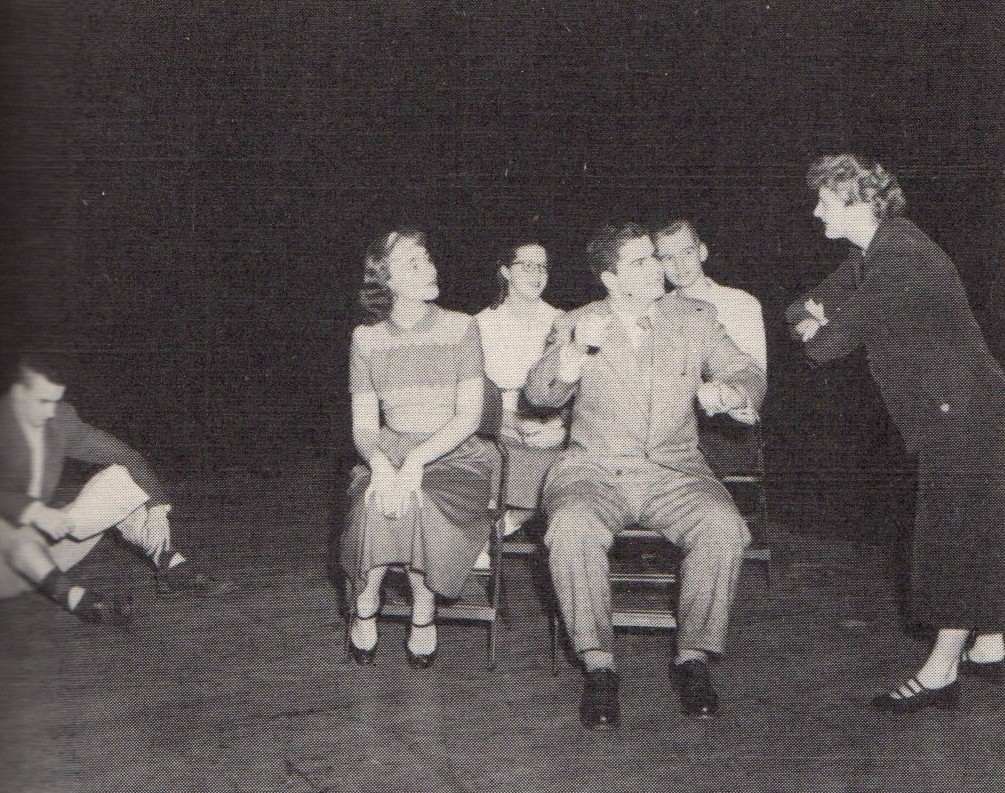
- A 1952 production of The Happy Journey at Shimer College
- Original language: English
- Written by: Thornton Wilder
- Characters: The Stage Manager; Ma, Mrs. Kate Kirby; Arthur, her son Caroline, her daughter Pa, Ma's husband Elmer; Beulah, the Kirbys' married daughter who lives in Camden
- Subject: a family travels by motorcar to visit a daughter in Camden
- Genre: Comedy
- Setting: the road going from Trenton to Camden in New Jersey

Premiere
- Date: November 25, 1931
- Place: Yale University theater in New Haven, Connecticut

The Happy Journey to Trenton and Camden is a one act play by American novelist and playwright Thornton Wilder written in 1931. It was first published in The Long Christmas Dinner and Other Plays in One Act (New York: Coward-McCann, 1931).

== Productions ==
The first production of The Happy Journey to Trenton and Camden was by the Yale Dramatic Association and the Vassar College Philalethis at the Yale University theater in New Haven, Connecticut, on November 25, 1931. It opened on Broadway at the Cort Theatre on March 16, 1948, in a production starring Peggy Allenby as Ma Kirby and Don MacLaughlin as Elmer. A production by Theodore Mann at the Circle in the Square Theatre which opened on April 21, 1993, won both a Tony Award and a Drama Desk Award for Outstanding Revival of a Play.

== Plot summary ==
Almost the entire play takes place during an automobile journey from Newark to Camden, New Jersey by a family on their way to visit a married daughter, who has recently lost a baby in childbirth. Very little happens, but the father, mother, and children reminisce, joke, and sightsee and somehow, in classic Thornton Wilder fashion, capture something of the universal joy and sadness of life as they motor along.

== Themes ==
Comparing this play with his later masterpiece, Our Town, Wilder said in 1974, "In my plays I attempted to raise ordinary daily conversation between ordinary people to the level of the universal human experience." In his "Notes to the Producer" written in 1931, Wilder stated that:

It should constantly be borne in mind that the purpose of this play is the portrayal of the character of Ma Kirby ... the director should constantly keep in mind that Ma Kirby's humor, strength and humanity constitute the unifying element throughout.

Eric Specie in an overview of the play says:

A family car trip occurs on a bare stage. Yet the ordinary is only the setting for an investigation of extraordinary existential issues. In this family drama, nothing much happens—and yet everything important happens. In this play, Ma Kirby is the leading and strong character. She is a loving mother, an active woman, strict about dress and manners, thoughts and beliefs in God. She is satisfied and joyful with her family members. For her, the place where her family lives is the best place on earth. As a responsible or good mother, she wants her children to be honest by doing good and think good. She is a philosophical, determined, and kind-hearted person.
