= Panama Hattie =

Musical

- Original Broadway poster
- Music: Cole Porter
- Lyrics: Cole Porter
- Book: Herbert Fields; B. G. DeSylva
- Productions: 1940 Broadway; 1942 Film; 1943 West End; 1954 U.S. Television

Panama Hattie is a 1940 American musical with music and lyrics by Cole Porter and book by Herbert Fields and B. G. DeSylva. The musical is about a nightclub owner, Hattie Maloney, who lives in the Panama Canal Zone and ends up dealing with both romantic and military intrigue. The title is a play on words, referring to the popular Panama hat.

The musical was adapted as the 1942 Metro-Goldwyn-Mayer musical film Panama Hattie, and again in 1954 as an episode of the CBS TV series The Best of Broadway.

== Productions ==
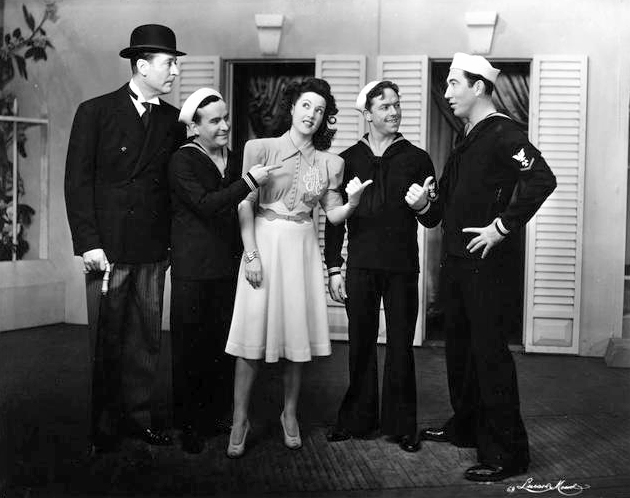
Arthur Treacher, Pat Harrington, Ethel Merman, Frank Hyers and Rags Ragland in the original Broadway production of Panama Hattie (1940)

Pre-Broadway tryouts started at the Shubert Theatre, New Haven on October 3, 1940, and then at the Shubert Theatre, Boston on October 8, 1940.

The musical premiered on Broadway at the 46th Street Theatre on October 30, 1940, and closed on January 3, 1942, after 501 performances. It was directed by Edgar MacGregor, with choreography by Robert Alton and scenic design and costumes by Raoul Pène Du Bois. The cast featured Ethel Merman as Hattie, Arthur Treacher as Vivian, Betty Hutton as Florrie, James Dunn as Nick, Phyllis Brooks as Leila, Joan Carroll as Geraldine, Rags Ragland as Woozy, and Pat Harrington as Skat. Among the dancers were June Allyson, Doris Dowling and Constance Dowling, Betsy Blair, Lucille Bremer and Vera-Ellen.

The show opened in the West End at the Piccadilly Theatre on November 4, 1943, and ran for 308 performances. It was produced by William Mollison with the entire production supervised by Lee Ephraim and dances by Wendy Toye. The cast featured Bebe Daniels as Hattie, Max Wall as Eddy, Claude Hulbert as Vivian, Frances Marsden as Florrie, Ivan Brandt as Nick, Georgia MacKinnon as Leila, Richard Hearne as Loopy and Betty Blackler as Elizabeth.

The musical was revived for several performances as a staged concert at Barbican Cinema 1 in London in 1996 as part of the "Lost Musicals" series directed and produced by Ian Marshall Fisher. Louise Gold starred as Hattie, with Jon Glover as Windy. The "Musicals Tonight!" series presented a staged concert of the musical in New York City in October 2010.

== Plot ==
Act I

Hattie Maloney owns a night club in the Panama Canal Zone where she also performs. Three sailors from the S.S. Idaho, Skat Briggs, Windy Deegan and Woozy Hoga, ask her to sing at a party they are organizing ("Join It Right Away"). Nick Bullet, Hattie's fiancé, is a wealthy Navy officer. They are about to meet his eight-year-old daughter Geraldine (Jerry), off the boat from Philadelphia. He tells Hattie, "My Mother Would Love You". Hattie, eager to make a good impression on her prospective stepdaughter, spends three weeks' wages on her elaborately frilly outfit. But when she arrives, Jerry makes fun of Hattie's clothing and way of speaking. Feeling that her marriage is off, Hattie gets drunk on rum ("I’ve still Got my Health"). Kitty-Belle, the daughter of Admiral Whitney Randolph, wants to marry Nick, and she schemes to end his romance with Hattie.

Florrie, a singer in the night club, develops a crush on Nick's very proper butler Vivian Budd ("Fresh as a Daisy"). Nick's efforts to persuade Jerry and Hattie to get along with each other finally succeed, with Jerry making the still hungover Hattie cut the bows off her dress and shoes ("Let’s Be Buddies"). Jerry gives Hattie advice on how to behave like a lady at a party where she is to be presented to Nick's boss, the Admiral ("I’m Throwing a Ball Tonight"). Admiral Randolph is to be presented with a cup, and his daughter Leila suggests that Hattie might present it filled with goldenrod. This gives Whitney hay fever; Hattie is blamed, and Nick is ordered not to marry Hattie.

Act II

The sailors from the S. S. Idaho uncover a spy plot involving saboteurs. Hattie swears off rum ("Make It Another Old Fashioned Please"). Hattie has it out with Leila, whose boyfriend keeps being called in whenever Hattie is on the verge of hitting her. Meanwhile, Florrie continues to try to attract the romantic attention of Budd ("All I’ve Got to Get Now is My Man"). Hattie, two of the sailors and Budd meet regarding these various threads ("You Said It"). Mildred Hunter, Leila's best friend, turns out to be a terrorist. She gives Jerry a secret package to put in Nick's desk. Hattie overhears the plot to blow up the Panama Canal control room, finds the bomb and throws it out, saving the day. The grateful Admiral Whitney retracts his order and the sailors praise Hattie ("God Bless the Woman").

== Songs ==
Source: Panama Hattie Original Broadway Production

Act 1

- "A Stroll on the Plaza Sant' Ana" – Ensemble
- "Join It Right Away" – Woozy, Skat, Windy, Ensemble
- "Visit Panama" – Hattie, Ensemble
- "My Mother Would Love You" – Hattie, Nick
- "I've Still Got My Health" – Hattie, Ensemble
- "Fresh as a Daisy" – Florrie, Skat, Windy
- "Welcome to Jerry" ("Welcome to Betty" London title) – Ensemble
- "Let's Be Buddies" – Hattie, Geraldine
- "I'm Throwing a Ball Tonight" – Hattie, Ensemble

Act 2

- "We Detest a Fiesta" – Ensemble
- "Who Would Have Dreamed?" – Janis Carter, Ty
- "Make It Another Old-Fashioned, Please" – Hattie
- "All I've Got to Get Now is My Man" – Florrie, Ensemble
- "You Said It" – Hattie, Budd, Woozy, Skat, Windy
- "God Bless the Woman"- Woozy, Skat, Windy

== Adaptations ==
=== Television ===
The Best of Broadway series broadcast a version of Panama Hattie on CBS Television on November 10, 1954. Ethel Merman, Ray Middleton, and Art Carney starred.

== Reception ==
Brooks Atkinson in The New York Times wrote that "By hiring a trio of knockabout comedians, Mr. De Sylva has given it all the advantages of a burlesque show...Everything is noisy, funny and in order." Merman "rolls though it with the greatest gusto, giving it a shake and a gleam and plenty of syncopation...The Merman hangs bangles on any song that comes her way."

"'Panama Hattie' was a typical example of turning a routine musical comedy into entertainment gold. Without her [Merman] there was no show, and the musical has rarely been heard of since."
