= Her Highness and the Bellboy =

1945 film by Richard Thorpe

- Theatrical release poster
- Directed by: Richard Thorpe
- Written by: Richard Connell; Gladys Lehman
- Produced by: Joe Pasternak
- Starring: Hedy Lamarr; Robert Walker; June Allyson
- Cinematography: Harry Stradling Sr.
- Edited by: George Boemler
- Music by: George E. Stoll
- Production company: Metro-Goldwyn-Mayer
- Distributed by: Loew's Inc.
- Release date: July 11, 1945
- Running time: 112 minutes
- Country: United States
- Language: English
- Budget: $1,157,000
- Box office: $3,169,000

Her Highness and the Bellboy is a 1945 American romantic comedy film directed by Richard Thorpe and starring Hedy Lamarr, Robert Walker, June Allyson and Rags Ragland. Written by Richard Connell and Gladys Lehman, the film is about a beautiful European princess who travels to New York City to find the newspaper columnist she fell in love with six years earlier. At her posh New York hotel, she is mistaken for a maid by a kind-hearted bellboy. Charmed by his confusion, the princess insists that he become her personal attendant, unaware that he has fallen in love with her. Her Highness and the Bellboy was released by Metro-Goldwyn-Mayer in the United States on July 11, 1945.

== Plot ==
The beautiful Princess Veronica (Hedy Lamarr) travels to New York City to find the American newspaper columnist she fell in love with six years earlier. After checking into the elegant Eaton Hotel, she is mistaken for a new maid by bellboy Jimmy Dobson (Robert Walker), who offers to accompany her on an afternoon stroll through Central Park. When they return, the hotel manager is shocked to see his bellboy with the princess and fires him for consorting with an important guest. Veronica saves Jimmy's job by insisting that the manager assign him to be her personal attendant while she is in New York.

When he is not working, Jimmy spends time with his slow-witted friend and co-worker, Albert Weever (Rags Ragland), and their good friend and neighbor Leslie Odell (June Allyson), a former dancer who is now bedridden and crippled. Leslie and Albert enjoy listening to Jimmy read fairy tale stories to them on their roof. Jimmy is unaware that Leslie is secretly in love with him.

Meanwhile, Veronica's traveling companion Countess Zoe (Agnes Moorehead) is concerned about Veronica wanting to rekindle an old romance with newspaper columnist Paul MacMillan (Warner Anderson)—hardly an appropriate match for a princess. She tries to persuade Veronica to forget her former American lover and marry the annoying Baron Zoltan Faludi, who followed her to New York, but the princess ignores her. When Veronica learns that Jimmy knows Paul, she asks him to deliver an invitation to Paul for a formal ball being held at the hotel that evening.

At the ball, Veronica and Paul are finally reunited after six years. Paul is still upset with her for abandoning him to marry another royal, who has since been assassinated. When she offers to renew their relationship, he turns her down, saying they are from two different worlds. After he leaves, Jimmy discovers her crying and tries to comfort her. Not knowing that the bellhop has fallen for her, she asks him to take her to a bar called Jake's Joint, where Paul likes to hang out. Knowing the bar is not appropriate for an elegant princess, Jimmy tries to change her mind, but she insists.

Believing that Veronica is in love with him, Jimmy rents a tuxedo for his big date. Just before he leaves, Albert reminds him that he's been neglecting their invalid neighbor Leslie. He goes to her room and gives her the corsage he had bought for the princess. After he leaves, the young woman breaks down in tears, believing her secret love for him will never be returned, now that he is dating a princess. She is left with her fantasies of dancing in the arms of the man she loves.

That night at Jake's Joint, while the princess is looking for Paul, Jimmy sees Albert in the company of gangsters. Thinking that Jimmy had abandoned him, Albert tells him he's now joined up with the gang. When the gang leader orders Albert to punch Jimmy, Albert punches the leader instead, and a brawl ensues. Veronica gets involved in the fight and is arrested in a police raid. While Veronica is in jail, news arrives at the hotel that her uncle has died from a fall and that she has succeeded to the throne.

The next morning, Jimmy wakes up in the bar after being knocked out during the fight, and makes his way to the hotel, where he is joined by Albert. The princess' entourage are upset over news that she was arrested the night before. Meanwhile, Paul arrives at the jail, bails out the princess, and accompanies her back to the hotel, where they learn that Veronica is now the queen of her country. When he sees her distracted by the pressures of being a queen, Paul leaves in frustration.

Later, when Veronica invites Jimmy to accompany her back to Hungary, Jimmy misinterprets her intentions and believes she wants him to share the throne with her. After accepting her offer, Jimmy packs his bags and stops by Leslie's room to say goodbye. Wanting to show him that she is recovering from her disability, Leslie attempts to walk across the room to him, and just as she falls, he catches her in his arms. Finally realizing how much Leslie loves him, and how much he loves her, Jimmy decides to remain in New York with her.

Returning to the hotel, Jimmy tells Veronica that he cannot go with her and be "king" because he loves another woman. Realizing that Jimmy has given up what he believed to be his crown in order to be with the woman he loves, Veronica is inspired to abdicate her throne and return to Paul, the man she loves. Sometime later, Jimmy is dancing at a nightclub with Leslie, who has made a full recovery, and they are joined by another happy couple, Veronica and Paul.

== Cast ==
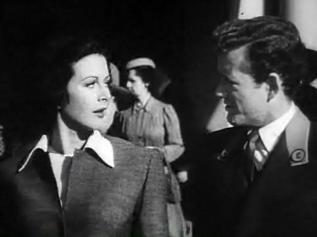
Hedy Lamarr and Robert Walker

- Hedy Lamarr as Princess Veronica
- Robert Walker as Jimmy Dobson
- June Allyson as Leslie Odell
- Carl Esmond as Baron Zoltan Faludi
- Agnes Moorehead as Countess Zoe
- Rags Ragland as Albert Weever
- Ludwig Stössel as Mr. Puft
- George Cleveland as Dr. Elfson
- Warner Anderson as Paul MacMillan
- Konstantin Shayne as Yanos Van Lankovitz
- Tom Trout as Hack
- Ben Lessy as himself
- Patty Moore as Fae
- Edward Gargan as 1st Cop

== Production notes ==
- Production Dates: 11 Dec 1944 to late Jan 1945 and retakes from 7 Feb to mid-Feb 1945
- MGM rushed production due to Hedy Lamarr's "impending motherhood".
- Hedy Lamarr completed her MGM contract when she finished filming Her Highness and the Bellboy.

== Reception ==
The film received mixed reviews. According to MGM records the film made $2,280,000 in the US and Canada and $889,000 elsewhere resulting in a modest profit of $915,000.
