= Elizabeth Lawrence (actress) =

American actress (1922–2000)

- Born: September 6, 1922; Huntington, West Virginia, US
- Died: June 11, 2000 (aged 77)
- Occupation: Actress
- Years active: 1947–2000
- Known for: All My Children

Elizabeth Lawrence (September 6, 1922 – June 11, 2000) was an American actress, best known for her role as Myra Murdock Sloane in the soap opera All My Children from 1979 to 1991.

== Life and career ==
Lawrence was born in Huntington, West Virginia, and obtained a bachelor's degree in science and a master's degree in special education. She made her acting debut in 1947 off broadway in Skin of our Teeth and her Broadway debut in 1954 in The Rainmaker and would go on to act in several other theatrical productions. She would also work on the daytime soap operas The Road of Life, The Edge of Night, A World Apart, The Doctors, Guiding Light, and All My Children from 1979 to 1991 where she played Myra Murdock Sloane. She earned three Daytime Emmy Award nominations in 1981, 1982 and 1985 for Outstanding Supporting Actress in a Drama Series. Her other notable acting work includes roles in the movies Four Friends, We're No Angels, Sleeping with the Enemy, The Butcher's Wife and The Crucible as well as guest starring roles on television series such as Law & Order, Oz and Third Watch. In the 1970s and 1980s, she also worked as an auxiliary police officer in Manhattan, New York.

== Filmography ==
=== Film ===
Year	Title	Role	Notes
1964	Lilith	Patient (uncredited role)	Feature film
1981	Four Friends	Mrs. Prozor	Feature film
1989	We're No Angels	Mrs. Blair	Feature film
1991	Sleeping with the Enemy	Chloe	Feature film
1991	The Butcher's Wife	Grammy D'Arbo	Feature film
1996	The Crucible	Rebecca Nurse	Feature film
2000	Isn't She Great	Minsey Hastings	Feature film
2000	Unbreakable	School nurse	Feature film
2000	The Ride Home	Clara (age 80)	Short film

=== Television ===
Year	Title	Role	Notes
1954	The Philco Television Playhouse	Unknown role	Episode: "Smoke Screen"
1954	The Road of Life	Francie Brent	Daytime serial (recurring role)
1955	Frontiers of Fatih	Unknown role	Episode: "The Biggest Yes in the World"
1961-1963; 1967	Edge of Night	Constance Johnson	Daytime serial (contract role 1961-1963)
1961-1963; 1967	Edge of Night	Vera Turek	Daytime serial (recurring 1967)
1963	East Side West Side	Emily Mooney	Episode: "The Sinner"
1965-1966	Bob Hope Presents the Chrysler Theatre	Unknown role	Episode: "The Admiral" (1965)
1965-1966	Bob Hope Presents the Chrysler Theatre	Mrs. Cunningham	Episode: "Guilty or Not Guilty" (1966)
1970	A World Apart	Betty Kahlman	Daytime serial (only appeared in pilot episode (#1.1); Augusta Dabney played the character for the remaining 324 episodes)
1974; 1998	As the World Turns	Marsha Davidson	Episode: #4595 (1974)
1974; 1998	As the World Turns	Mrs. Foerter	Episode: "October 12, 1998" (1998)
1976-1978	The Doctors	Virginia Dancy	Daytime serial (contract role)
1979-1991	All My Children	Myra Murdoch Sloan	Daytime serial (contract role) For Daytime Emmy info, see Awards and nominations section below for details
1991	Law & Order	Miss Elsie Hatch	Episode: "Asylum"
1993-1994	Guiding Light	Bess Lowell	Daytime serial (recurring role)
1998	Oz	Beecher's Grandmother	Episode: "Family Bizness"
2000	Third Watch	Mary Stiverson	Episode: "Young Men and Fire..."; Final role

== Awards and nominations ==
Year	Award	Category	Work	Result
1981	Daytime Emmy Award	Outstanding Supporting Actress in a Drama Series	All My Children	Nominated
1982	Daytime Emmy Award	Outstanding Supporting Actress in a Drama Series	All My Children	Nominated
1985	Daytime Emmy Award	Outstanding Supporting Actress in a Drama Series	All My Children	Nominated

== Death ==
Lawrence died of cancer on June 11, 2000, at age 77. M. Night Shyamalan's Unbreakable was dedicated to her memory.
