= Whistling in Brooklyn =

1943 film by S. Sylvan Simon

- Theatrical release poster
- Directed by: S. Sylvan Simon
- Written by: Nat Perrin; Wilkie C. Mahoney (add. dialogue); Stanley Roberts (uncredited)
- Produced by: George Haight
- Starring: Red Skelton; Ann Rutherford; Jean Rogers
- Cinematography: Lester White
- Edited by: Ben Lewis
- Music by: George Bassman
- Production company: Metro-Goldwyn-Mayer
- Distributed by: Loew's, Inc.
- Release date: December 1943
- Running time: 87 minutes
- Country: United States
- Language: English

Whistling in Brooklyn is a 1943 crime comedy film directed by S. Sylvan Simon and starring Red Skelton, Ann Rutherford, and Jean Rogers. It is the third and last film starring Skelton as radio personality and amateur detective Wally "The Fox" Benton, following Whistling in the Dark and Whistling in Dixie. Leo Durocher, then-manager of the Brooklyn Dodgers, made his screen debut, playing himself, while Dodgers "superfan" Hilda Chester also made a brief appearance, playing herself.

== Plot ==
Wally prepares to marry his girlfriend, but gets sidetracked when he is mistaken for a serial killer.

== Cast ==
- Red Skelton as Wally Benton
- Ann Rutherford as Carol Lambert
- Jean Rogers as Jean Pringle
- Rags Ragland as Chester Conway
- Ray Collins as Grover Kendall
- Henry O'Neill as Inspector Holcomb
- William Frawley as Detective Ramsey
- Sam Levene as Creeper
- Arthur Space as Detective MacKenzie
- Robert Emmett O'Connor as Detective Leo Finnigan
- Steve Geray as Whitey
- Howard Freeman as Steve Conlon
- Mike Mazurki as thug
- Lillian Yarbo as Maid (uncredited)
- Dorothy Wilson as Radio Quartette Member (uncredited)

== Production ==
Filming at Ebbets Field took place in early April 1943, before the Dodgers’ season opener on 21 April. The several hundred extras were “shivering in their seats,” each paid $5.50 unless they had a line of dialogue—meaning $25 for a day’s work.

== Reception ==
The New York Times wrote: “The high-jinks start when Red’s mutton-headed man Friday (Rags Ragland) tips off the police that The Fox [Skelton] is actually the desperate criminal who brags about his crimes in the letters-to-the-editor column using the appellation ‘Constant Reader.’ Well, one complication leads to another and The Fox is being pursued both by the police and the real killer all over Brooklyn, through a vacant warehouse, Ebbets Field and finally down along the waterfront for a slam-bang slapstick climax in the galley of an abandoned ship. Some of the doings are mildly amusing, but most are just plain nonsense....Better luck next time, folks!”
