= Wonderful John Acton =

American TV situation comedy series (1953)

- Genre: Sitcom
- Written by: William Kendall Clarke; Robert J. Shaw; Martha Wilkerson
- Directed by: Grey Lockwood
- Starring: Harry Holcombe; Ian Martin; Virginia Dwyer
- Music by: John Gart
- Country of origin: United States

Production
- Producer: Edward A. Byron

Original release
- Network: NBC
- Release: July 5 – September 22, 1953

Wonderful John Acton is an American television situation comedy that was broadcast on NBC from July 5, 1953, until September 22, 1953.

== Background ==
Edward A. Byron, the producer, based the title character on his own grandfather. The concept for the series began when Byron related anecdotes about his childhood in Newport, Kentucky, during a birthday dinner. "A few days later," he said, "Tom McDermott, an ad agency guy, buttonholed me on the street -- told me I ought to write those things down, that he thought they'd make a good TV series."

== Premise ==
Kevin Acton narrated episodes about his grandfather, John, whom Kevin considered to be "wonderful". The setting was 1919 in Ludlow, Kentucky, where John Acton owned and operated (and lived in the back of) a store that sold candy and notions. He was also the county clerk. Kevin was seen as a child in episodes but the adult Kevin was not seen as narrator. Julia was John's widowed daughter and 12-year-old Kevin's mother. Aunt Bessie was John Acton's sister.

== Cast ==
- John Acton - Harry Holcombe
- Uncle Terrence - Ian Martin
- Julia - Virginia Dwyer
- Kevin Acton (child) - Ronnie Walken
- Aunt Bessie - Jane Rose
- Peter Bodkin Sr. - Pat Harrington
- Birdie Bodkin - Mary Michael
- Kevin Acton (narrator) -Luis Van Rooten

== Production ==
Grey Lockwood was the director. Writers included Byron, William Kendall Clarke, Robert J. Shaw, and Martha Wilkerson. John Gart provided music. The show originated from WNBT in New York City.

As a summer replacement for Red Skelton's program, Wonderful John Acton was broadcast on Sundays at 10 p.m. Eastern Time from July 5, 1953, through August 31, 1953. It was moved to Tuesdays at 8:30 p.m. beginning on September 8, 1953, ending its run in that time slot on September 22, 1953, for a total of 13 episodes. It was broadcast live in black-and white, sometimes with a studio audience. Sponsors included Revlon. An article in The New York Times described the September shift of NBC's My Son Jeep and Wonderful John Acton to Milton Berle's usual time slot as putting "two of its more promising half-hour summer shows into the ccomedian's time period for a three-week 'showcasing' for prospective sponsors."

== Critical response ==
TV critic Steven H. Scheuer wrote that Wonderful John Acton was "a real 'sleeper'. It's a charming and nostalgic bit of Americana, a family comedy". He described the cast as "excellent".

A review of the premiere episode in the trade publication Variety called the program "a charming, nostalgic re-creation of the life of an authentic Irish-American tribe ..." It said that the episode "was a bit too contrived" but commended Martin's performance as Uncle Terrence. The review also complimented Lockwood's directing, the "lower middle-class of yesterday sets", and the "lilting Irish musical accompaniment".
