= Panama Hattie (film) =

1942 film

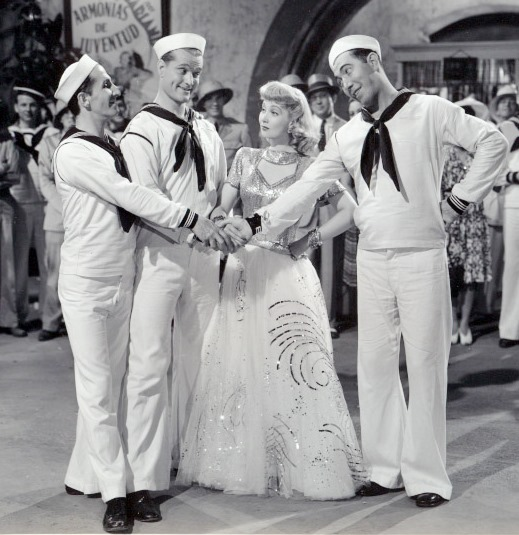
- Ben Blue, Red Skelton, Ann Sothern and Rags Ragland in Panama Hattie
- Directed by: Norman Z. McLeod
- Written by: Jack McGowan (screenplay); Wilkie C. Mahoney (screenplay)
- Based on: Panama Hattie; 1940 musical by Herbert Fields; Buddy G. DeSylva
- Produced by: Arthur Freed
- Starring: Red Skelton; Ann Sothern; Rags Ragland
- Cinematography: George J. Folsey
- Edited by: Blanche Sewell
- Music by: Score: Georgie Stoll; Songs: Roger Edens; Cole Porter; Phil Moore; Alex Hyde; Burton Lane (music); Yip Harburg (lyrics)
- Distributed by: Metro-Goldwyn-Mayer
- Release date: 1942
- Running time: 79-80 mins
- Country: United States
- Language: English
- Budget: $1.1 million
- Box office: $2.3 million

Panama Hattie is a 1942 American musical film based upon the Broadway musical of the same name. It was produced by Arthur Freed and directed by Norman Z. McLeod.

== Plot ==
“Warning! Any resemblance between the three sailors in the story and human beings is truly accidental.” To "The Sailor's Hornpipe," the said three sailors burst through the paper panel, introducing themselves. Red falls, and his buddies help him up, making the kind of wisecracks that will continue throughout the film.

Dissolve to the entrance to Phil's Place. The chorus introduces Panama Hattie who sings her signature song. The three sailors are big fans, when they are not chasing any girl in sight. They do a bit with Flo. Enter the Berry Brothers, who perform a dance routine that ends with the trio leaping from a high balcony over the entire orchestra, landing in splits.

Hattie joins the sailors, who are obsessed with finding spies. She is happy about marrying Sgt. Dick Bullard, a soldier from a rich family in Philadelphia, but she is worried about meeting Gerry, his 8-year-old daughter from a previous marriage.

When Dick and the sailors meet Gerry and Jerkins, the family butler, at the dock, they also encounter an old friend of Dick's, the Admiral's affected niece Leila Tree.

Hattie is a flamboyant dresser off stage as well as on, adding ruffles, feathers, bows, frills and furbelows, pompoms and jewelry wherever there is room on a dress, hat or parasol. Gerry laughs and says she likes people who dress up "funny." Hattie is hurt and angry.

Cut to the night club. Lena Horne sings "Just One of Those Things." The sailors engage in some byplay. Hattie is drunk; Jerkins brings messages from Gerry and her father, and she melts.

The next day, Flo, who is smitten with Jerkins, asks to go to Dick's hotel with Hattie. Flo sings "I'm fresh as a daisy…" Hattie and Dick make up. Leila Tree wants to meet Hattie. She is rude, but invites them to a party.

The sailors pursue three Panamanian girls, singing and dancing to "Good Neighbors," ending with a kiss.

At the hotel, Hattie asks Gerry about her dress. Gerry fixes it by taking off the bows on her sleeves and back. She also suggests "walking plain," but ends with "Daddy thinks you're wonderful." Hattie sings "Let's be Buddies." Flo sings the same song, with a jive beat, to the deadpan Jerkins, pursuing him until he is stretched across her lap.

In Phil's, Hans takes down a message from Mr. Kepler. "Come to the empty house at midnight. Be ready to do your stuff. X. L. 3." He gives it to Bruno. Red hands Bruno a note to Leila—he wants to distract her from Dick—but Bruno gives her the wrong one. She throws the paper at Red and slaps him. Leila accuses Hattie of putting Red up to it and warns her that she will be in Dick's way if they marry. Hattie packs to leave and bids the boys farewell.

Red thinks that the cryptic note is spy work. The terrified trio go to the empty house, which is full of tables of chemicals. They hide in a large armoire. Two men wearing fedoras come in. A secret door in the fireplace, the armoire, a revolving panel on a high ledge over a pit of alligators and an unseen gunman create chaos until a bullet ignites the chemicals and the house blows up.

A brawl in the bar provides comic relief and a chance for Hattie to run for the boat. Jerkins rushes to tell Dick and Gerry that she is leaving.

The sailors are heroes for (unwittingly) beating up the spies in the brawl. Flo sings "Did I get Stinkin'?" The Berry Brothers and Lena Horne perform "The Sping."

Hattie and Dick, appear, now married, Gerry in tow. Red proposes to Leila, promising to show her "where Japan used to be" after the war.

Hattie starts singing “The Son of a Gun Who Picks on Uncle Sam” and the cast joins in.

== Cast ==
- Red Skelton as Red
- Ann Sothern as Hattie Maloney
- Rags Ragland as Rags (as 'Rags' Ragland)
- Ben Blue as Rowdy
- Marsha Hunt as Leila Tree
- Virginia O'Brien as Flo Foster
- Alan Mowbray as Jay Jerkins, Dick's Butler
- Dan Dailey as Sgt. Dick Bulliard (as Dan Dailey Jr.)
- Jackie Horner as Geraldine 'Gerry' Bulliard
- Lena Horne as herself
- Berry Brothers nightclub dancers

== Notes ==
Substantial retakes were directed by Roy Del Ruth with choreography by Danny Dare and musical numbers staged by Vincente Minnelli. The film used only four of Cole Porter's songs and substituted other songs. Songs used in the film are as follows:

- "Hattie from Panama" (Roger Edens) – Chorus
- "I've Still Got My Health" (Porter) – Ann Sothern
- "Berry Me Not" (Phil Moore) – instrumental, danced by the Berry Brothers]
- "Just One of Those Things" (Porter, from Jubilee) – Lena Horne
- "Fresh As a Daisy" (Porter) – Virginia O'Brien
- "Good Neighbors" (Edens) – Red Skelton, Rags Ragland, Ben Blue and Chorus
- "Let's Be Buddies" (Porter) – Sothern with Jackie Horner, and O'Brien with Alan Mowbray
- "Hail, Hail, the Gang's All Here" (music by Arthur Sullivan and Theodore F. Morse) [instrumental]
- "Did I Get Stinkin' At the Savoy" (music by Walter Donaldson, lyrics by Yip Harburg) – O'Brien
- "The Sping" (Moore and J. LeGon) – sung by Horne, danced by the Berry Brothers and drummed by Leo Watson
- "The Son of a Gun Who Picks on Uncle Sam" (music by Burton Lane, lyrics by Harburg) – Company

== Reception ==
In his October 2, 1942 review in The New York Times, Bosley Crowther waxed poetic, but it was no tribute: “Panama Hattie" was finished last Fall. At several sneak previews, it cast a great pall. Metro revised it, with scissors and pen, but it couldn't put. "Panama Hattie" together again...” What remained was “just a jumble of songs and dull slapstick… the joy has been taken out of it, along with the ribald gags. …Now all that is left is the title, a couple of Cole Porter songs, one minor comedy sequence and Rags Ragland, looking very forlorn. The blithesome Ann Sothern, who should have been sharp in the title role, is virtually placed in quarantine … And the usually Irrepressible Red Skelton is so held in check in this film that his favorite expression, "I dood it," is this time an idle boast.To be sure, some of the music is fetching. Virginia O'Brien sings "Fresh as a Daisy" humorously, though her other number, "At the Savoy," is in decidedly questionable taste. Lena Horne, a newcomer from the night clubs, trills a rhumba rhythm. "The Sping," with plenty of spark. And the whole company gets together on a finale which frantically waves the flag. But it takes more than music to make a picture. Or has that been said before?”

According to MGM records the film earned $1,798,000 in the US and Canada, $528,000 elsewhere, making the studio a profit of $474,000.
