= Virginia Dwyer =

American actress

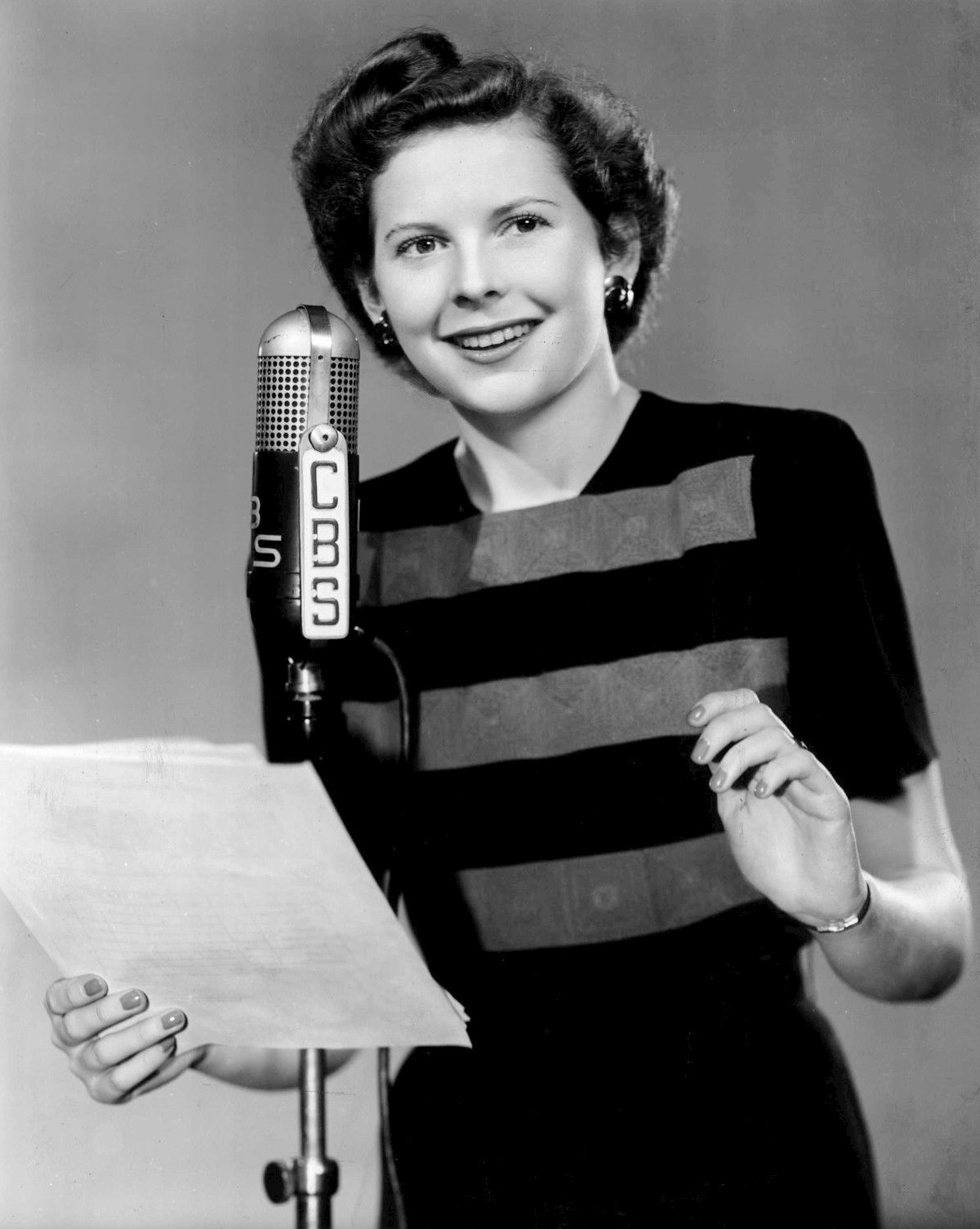
- Dwyer in 1941
- Born: Virginia Dwyer Gorman; December 19, 1919; Omaha, Nebraska, U.S.
- Died: August 20, 2012 (aged 92); New York City, U.S.
- Occupation: Actress
- Years active: 1942–1975
- Spouse: Walter Gorman

Virginia Dwyer Gorman (December 19, 1919 – August 20, 2012) was an American actress known for her roles in several daytime soap operas. From 1954 to 1962, she had roles on at least five daytime programs, including The Road of Life, The Secret Storm, Young Dr. Malone, Guiding Light, and As the World Turns.

== Early life ==
Born in Omaha, Nebraska, Dwyer first acted on TV in a live drama on WABD in New York City.

== Career ==
She was best known for her role as matriarch Mary Matthews on Another World, a role she played from the series premiere in 1964 until her departure in 1975. Although popular with the audience, she fell into disfavor with headwriter Harding Lemay, reportedly because she refused to learn her dialogue as written. Finally, Lemay had the Mary Matthews character die unexpectedly off-camera, thus eliminating Dwyer from the program. After being a regular performer on daytime television for over 20 years, Dwyer did not work on daytime again (other than appearing in one commercial) after leaving Another World.

On old-time radio, Dwyer played Ellen Smith in Houseboat Hannah and Sally Farrell in Front Page Farrell. On TV, she portrayed Julia Acton in Wonderful John Acton (1953).

== Personal life and death ==
At one time, she was married to director/producer Walter Gorman. She died in 2012 in Manhattan aged 92.
