= Don MacLaughlin =

American actor (1906–1986)

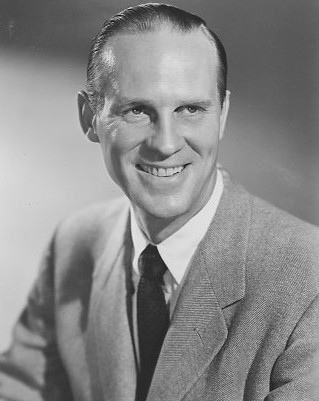
- Born: November 24, 1906; Webster, Iowa, U.S.
- Died: May 28, 1986 (aged 79); Goshen, Connecticut, U.S.
- Occupation: Actor
- Spouse: Mary Prugh
- Children: 3

William Donald MacLaughlin (November 24, 1906 – May 28, 1986) was an American actor. He began acting in 1933 on radio, and he originated the role of Chris Hughes on the soap opera As the World Turns.

== Early years ==
William Donald MacLaughlin was born on November 24, 1906, in Webster, Iowa, and his father was a doctor. MacLaughlin's family contained "a long line of ministers", and he planned to study for the ministry when he entered college. He studied speech and English at Iowa Wesleyan University, Northwestern University, and the University of Arizona.

== Career ==
Prior to TV, MacLaughlin was active on radio, beginning in 1933. He starred as the main character on Counterspy in the 1940s and 1950s. In 1945, he joined the cast of The Romance of Helen Trent, in the role of Dwight Swanson, "a rancher who becomes interested in Helen Trent." MacLaughlin was also a member of the Gang Busters, and he was in the cast of Buck Private and His Girl.

On the stage, MacLaughlin appeared in The Fifth Column (1940), Virginia Reel (1947), and the 1948 Broadway production of The Happy Journey to Trenton and Camden.

MacLaughlin entered television in 1956, originating the role of lawyer Chris Hughes on As the World Turns and played the role until his death in 1986. Contract negotiations kept him (and his on-screen wife Helen Wagner) off the soap for most of the early 1980s, but the show finally welcomed the two back in a big storyline with heavy use of past clips from the show. In the story, Chris and his wife Nancy were celebrating their fiftieth wedding anniversary. In real life, As the World Turns was celebrating its thirtieth anniversary on the air.

== Personal life ==
MacLaughlin married Mary Prugh, a newspaperwoman. They had three children.

== Death ==
After a brief illness, MacLaughlin died on May 28, 1986, at his daughter's home in Goshen, Connecticut, and is buried in Dover, Vermont.

== Filmography ==
=== Radio ===
| Original air date | Program | Role |
|---|---|---|
| 1942–1946 | Chaplain Jim | Chaplain Jim |
| 1942–1957 | Counterspy | David Harding |
| 1945 | The Romance of Helen Trent | Dwight Swanson |
| 1945–1947 | Tennessee Jed | Tennessee Jed Sloan |
| | As the Twig Is Bent | Kit Collins |
| 1954–1955 | The Road of Life | Dr. Jim Brent |
| | The Zane Grey Theater | Tex Throne |
| | Buck Private | Floyd Munson |

=== Television ===
| Year | Program | Role |
|---|---|---|
| 1956–1986 | As the World Turns | Chris Hughes |

=== Stage ===
| Year | Program | Role |
|---|---|---|
| 1940 | The Fifth Column | |
| 1947 | Virginia Reel | |
| 1948 | The Happy Journey to Trenton and Camden | Elmer |
