= The Road of Life (TV series) =

- Genre: Soap opera
- Created by: Irna Phillips
- Starring: Don MacLaughlin; Virginia Dwyer
- Country of origin: United States
- Original language: English
- No. of seasons: 1
- No. of episodes: 144

Production
- Producer: John Egan

Original release
- Network: CBS
- Release: December 13, 1954 – July 1, 1955

The Road of Life is an American daytime soap opera which aired on CBS from December 13, 1954, to July 1, 1955. The series was created by Irna Phillips and debuted on radio in 1937. The story follows doctor Jim Brent and his wife Jocelyn (played by Don MacLaughlin and Virginia Dwyer) in a small town in Merrimack County, New Hampshire.

The program was broadcast Monday through Friday from 1:15 to 1:30 p.m. Eastern Time. Because many CBS affiliates choose to run local news and talk shows during The Road of Life time slot, it never achieved the popularity of its radio counterpart and was canceled after six months. However the radio version of the series continued until 1959.

== Cast ==
- Don MacLaughlin as Dr. Jim Brent
- Virginia Dwyer as Jocelyn Brent
- Charles Dingle as Conrad Overton
- Barbara Becker as Sybil Overton Fuller
- Harry Holcombe as Malcolm Overton
- Elizabeth Lawrence as Francie Brent
- John Larkin as Frank Dana #1
- Chuck Webster as Frank Dana #2
- Jack Lemmon as Surgeon
- Dorothy Sands as Reggie Ellis
- Bill Lipton as John Brent

== See also ==
- List of radio soaps
