= Pat Harrington Sr. =

Canadian actor

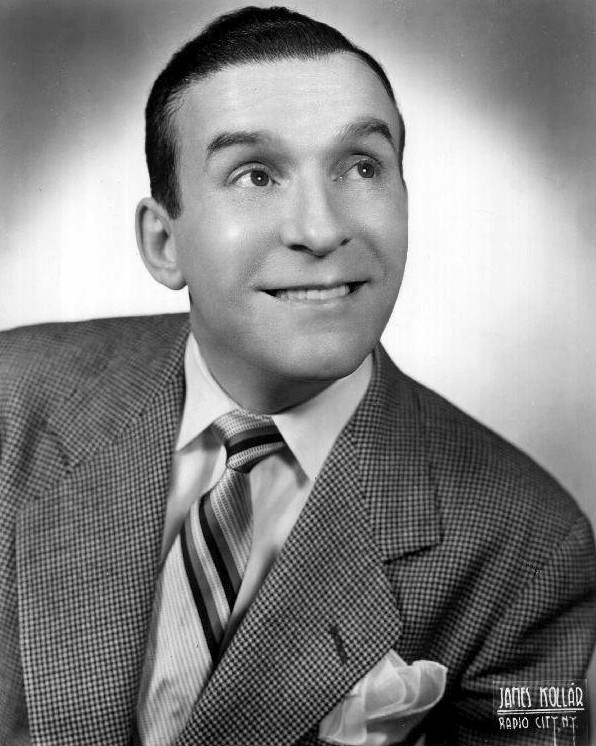
- Harrington in 1956
- Born: Daniel Patrick Harrington; February 6, 1901; Montreal, Quebec, Canada
- Died: September 2, 1965 (aged 64); East Islip, New York, U.S.
- Occupation: Actor
- Children: Pat Harrington Jr.

Daniel Patrick Harrington Sr. (February 6, 1901 – September 2, 1965) was a Canadian actor.

== Biography ==
Born Daniel Patrick Harrington in Montreal, Quebec, he made his Broadway debut in Panama Hattie in 1940. Additional Broadway credits included the patriotic revue Star and Garter (1942), The Front Page (1946), Call Me Madam (1950) and Sunday in New York (1961). He also appeared on the early television series A Couple of Joes (1949) and Wonderful John Acton (1953).

He was the father of actor Pat Harrington Jr.

He died in East Islip, New York on September 2, 1965.
