= The Falcon Takes Over =

1942 film by Irving Reis

- Promotional poster
- Directed by: Irving Reis
- Screenplay by: Lynn Root; Frank Fenton
- Based on: Farewell, My Lovely; 1940 novel by Raymond Chandler and Michael Arlen (characters)
- Produced by: Howard Benedict
- Starring: George Sanders; Lynn Bari; James Gleason; Allen Jenkins; Helen Gilbert
- Cinematography: George Robinson
- Edited by: Harry Marker
- Music by: Constantin Bakaleinikoff
- Production company: RKO Radio Pictures
- Distributed by: RKO Radio Pictures (theatrical)
- Release date: May 29, 1942
- Running time: 65 minutes
- Country: United States
- Language: English

The Falcon Takes Over (also known as The Falcon Steps Out), is a 1942 black-and-white mystery film directed by Irving Reis. Although the film features the Falcon and other characters created by Michael Arlen, its plot is taken from the Raymond Chandler novel Farewell, My Lovely, with the Falcon substituting for Chandler's archetypal private eye Philip Marlowe and the setting of New York City replacing Marlowe's Los Angeles beat. The B film was the third, following The Gay Falcon and A Date with the Falcon (1941), to star George Sanders as the character Gay Lawrence, a gentleman detective known by the sobriquet the Falcon.

== Plot ==
Prison escapee Moose Malloy is looking for his girlfriend, Velma Valento, whom he has not seen for five years. Velma was a showgirl at Florian's, a now-defunct nightclub which has become Club 13. Nobody there has heard of Velma, and after a frustrated Moose runs amok and kills the manager, Montgomery, amateur sleuth Gay Lawrence, aka The Falcon, takes an interest in the affair. The Falcon visits Jessie Florian, widow of Mike, the owner of the defunct nightclub. She is cagey and tells him that Velma is dead.

What Florian does not tell the Falcon is that Velma has re-invented herself as café society fixture Diana Kenyon. She dates the shady owner of the Swan Club, Laird Burnett, for whom Moose took a manslaughter rap. Burnett pays Florian for her silence. Burnett runs a blackmailing racket. Working with Diana and Lindsay Marriott, he recommends well-heeled Swan Club patrons to psychic Jules Amthor, who ferrets out compromising information.

Fearful of the Falcon's interest, Burnett sets a trap. Marriott hires the Falcon on the pretext of delivering ransom for a stolen jade necklace. The Falcon avoids harm, but Marriott is killed. Aspiring newspaper reporter Anne Reardon has been following the Falcon and arrives in the aftermath. In Marriott's pocket, they find Amthor's business card.

To get rid of Moose, Burnett has Florian send him to Amthor, who is waiting with a gun. The Falcon's assistant, Goldy Locke, is there when Moose breaks Amthor's neck and is saved when police arrive and Moose flees. The Falcon and Goldy return to Florian's and discover she has been murdered. The Falcon finds a photograph of Velma but concludes it is a fake. Anne traces the jade necklace to Diana. At the Swan Club, the Falcon is introduced by Diana to Laird Burnett. Diana claims to know where to find the girl in the photograph, supposedly Velma, and the wary Falcon accepts a ride.

In the car, Diana pulls a gun, and the Falcon confirms the blackmail scheme and that she is Velma. When the car stops, she is surprised by Moose, who has taken the place of her chauffeur, Gerger. Moose is unhappy that she is going with Burnett; she shoots him and is turning her gun on the Falcon when Anne's approaching car backfires, which Diana mistakes for gunfire. In the confusion, the Falcon takes her gun. Diana is delivered to the police, Anne has a scoop for the newspaper, and the Falcon moves on to his next case.

== Cast ==
- George Sanders as Gay Lawrence/The Falcon
- Lynn Bari as Ann Reardon
- James Gleason as Inspector Mike O'Hara
- Allen Jenkins as Jonathan "Goldy" Locke
- Warren Jackson as Montgomery
- Helen Gilbert as Diana Kenyon/Velma Valento
- Ward Bond as Moose Malloy
- Edward Gargan as Bates
- Anne Revere as Jessie Florian
- George Cleveland as Jerry
- Harry Shannon as Grimes
- Hans Conried as Lindsay Marriott
- Turhan Bey as Jules Amthor
- Charlie Hall as Louie
- Mickey Simpson as Bartender
- Selmer Jackson as Laird Burnett (uncredited)

== Production ==
The film, based on Farewell, My Lovely by Raymond Chandler, was the first adaptation of a Philip Marlowe story, before Time to Kill, released later in the same year. That film, though, did not use Marlowe as the main character, changing the character's name to Michael Shayne (Lloyd Nolan). RKO had replaced its The Saint series with The Falcon in 1941. Both series starred George Sanders.

== Reception ==
The Falcon Takes Over was considered a "co-feature" or the second half of a double bill. Theodore Strauss in his review for The New York Times, wrote, "For a man of Mr. Sanders's cool talents, The Falcon Takes Over is a distinct waste of time." Later, similar reviews were received. Critic Louis Black, in a 1999 article for The Austin Chronicle, wrote that the film "... had none of the atmosphere of Chandler's book" and recommended instead, the later adaptation, Murder, My Sweet (1944).

In 2002, film reviewer Bruce Newman wrote in the San Jose Mercury News, "The studios had so little interest in the character that in the first two movie adaptations of Chandler's books, he was replaced. When RKO bought the screen rights to Farewell, My Lovely, the studio made a craven bid to cash in on the popularity of the Warner Bros. hit, The Maltese Falcon, turning Marlowe into a detective called the Falcon (played by George Sanders) and releasing the movie with the title, The Falcon Takes Over".
