= Les Damon =

American actor (1908–1962)

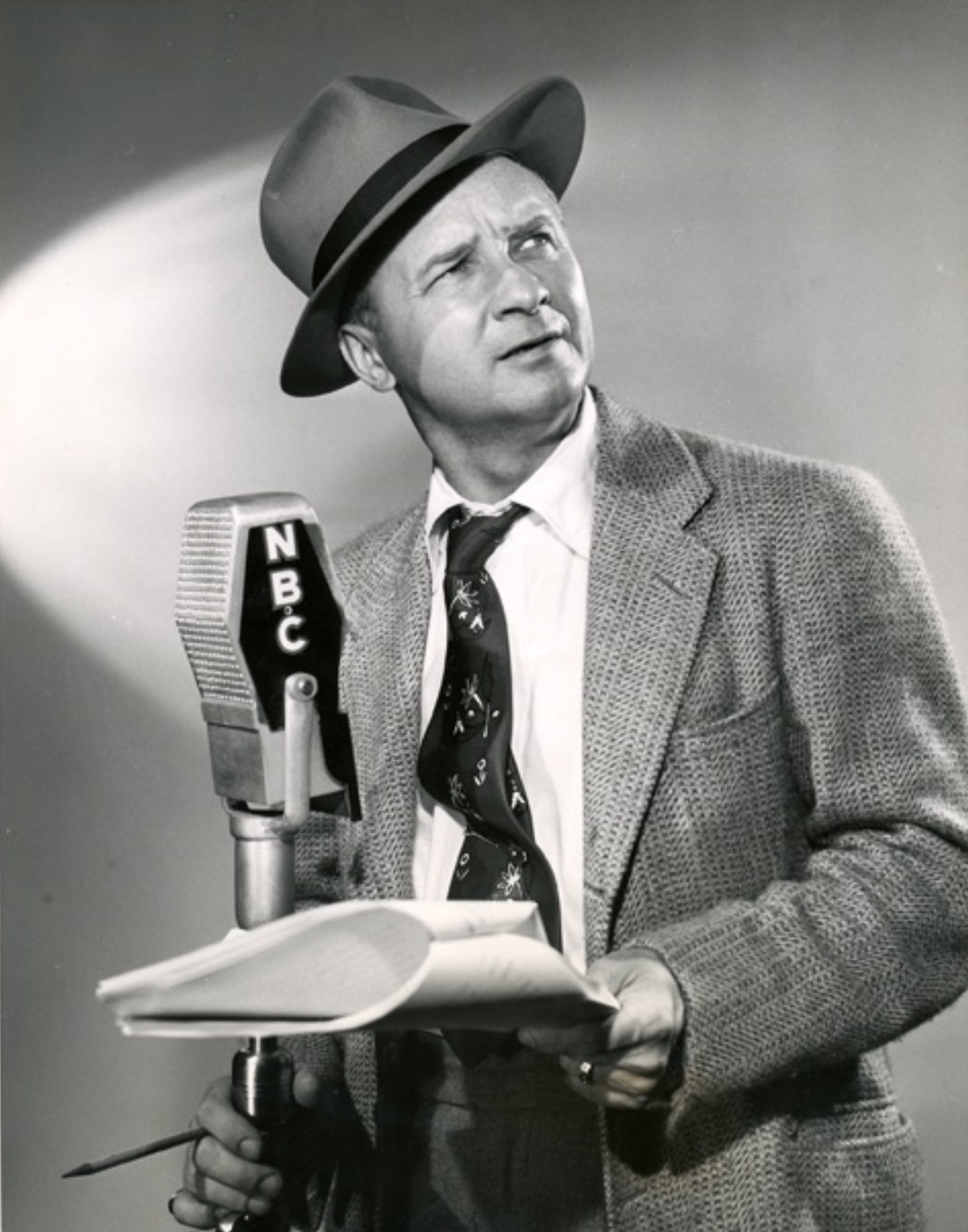
- Damon as Michael Waring on The Falcon
- Born: Lester Joseph Damon; March 31, 1908; Providence, Rhode Island, U.S.
- Died: July 21, 1962 (aged 54); Los Angeles, California, U.S.
- Occupation: Actor
- Years active: 1930–1962
- Known for: Nick Charles on The Adventures of the Thin Man; Michael Waring on The Falcon
- Spouse: Ginger Jones (m. 1943)
- Children: Lisa
- Military career
- Allegiance: United States of America
- Branch: United States Army Air Forces
- Service years: 1943–1946
- Rank: Technical Sergeant

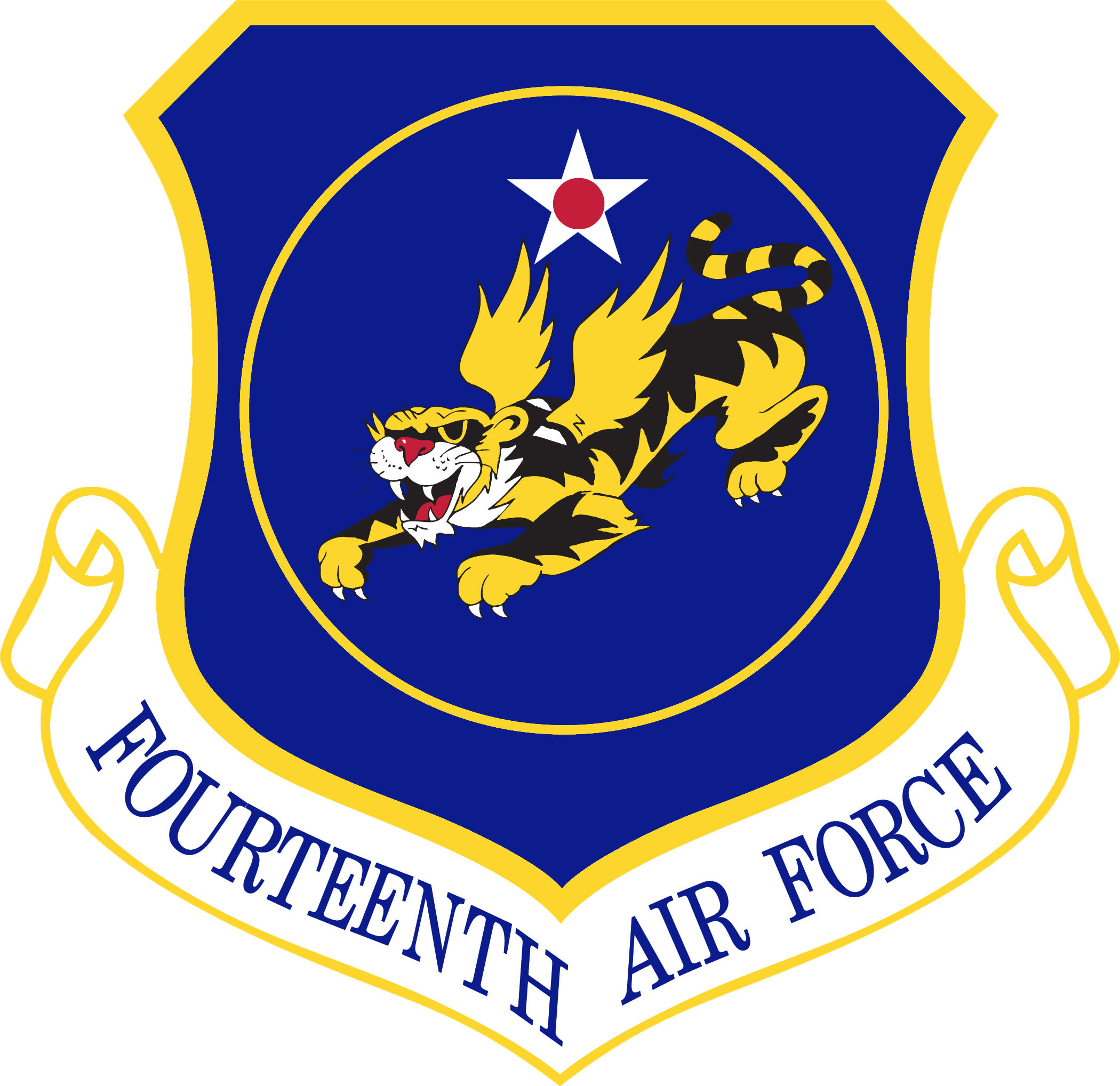
- Unit: Fourteenth Air Force
- Commands: China Burma India Theater
- Conflicts: World War II
- Awards: Bronze Star

Lester Joseph Damon (March 31, 1908 – July 21, 1962) was an American character actor best known for his nearly 30 years performing on radio. Out of all his appearances on radio, Damon was best remembered for his roles as Nick Charles on The Adventures of the Thin Man from 1941-1943 and again from 1946-1950 on NBC then CBS and as Michael Waring on The Falcon from 1950-1953 on Mutual.

== Early years ==
Damon was born on March 31, 1908, in Providence, Rhode Island. He attended and graduated from Brown University.

== Early career ==
Damon began acting in the early 1930s traveling with different stock companies in and out of the United States. Damon first started acting with the Albee Stock Company in Providence. In 1934, Damon became an apprentice with the Old Vic Company in Lambeth, England. He remained there for a year until he came back to the United States.

== Army ==
In 1943, Damon was drafted into the United States Military. He served in the Fourteenth Air Force of the Army Air Forces as a technical sergeant. Damon was stationed in the China Burma India Theater. He also served at the IBN outlet in Bhamo, Burma where he announced live spots between transcribed rebroadcasts of stateside programs, along with news broadcasts, interviews, and other assorted local features. Damon returned home in 1946. He was rewarded a Bronze Star for his service during World War II.

== Radio ==
Damon returned to the States in 1938 after his stock company along his stage career folded. After struggling to establish himself as a stage actor in America, Damon went to Chicago where he a took several odd jobs in radio. He soon landed a job at Air Features, Inc., a radio production company headed by daytime radio monarchs Frank and Anne Hummert. Damon became a frequent voice in Hummert soaps of the late 1930s, usually playing either sympathetic go-getters or stern authority figures, in series such as The Romance of Helen Trent and Houseboat Hannah. Damon would remain a Hummert and daytime soap favorite through the early 1940s.

By the time the 1940s came about, Damon had been bouncing between Chicago and New York. On July 2, 1941, Damon became known as "The Thin Man" on NBC Radio's The Adventures of the Thin Man. Damon became the title role on the program, a former private detective named Nick Charles who, each week, is drawn, usually against his own will, into investigating a murder. Damon starred in this program opposite Claudia Morgan who played his wife Nora.

Damon would leave the series shortly after its move to CBS in 1943 to serve in the military (see above). Actors David Gothard and Les Tremayne substituted for Damon as Nick Charles during Damon's absence. Damon returned from the military in 1946 and resumed the role of Charles until December 1947. Tremayne was rehired as the role of Charles until 1948 when Joseph Curtin was hired as Charles until the program's cancellation in 1950.

In 1950, Damon replaced Tremayne once again on the radio program The Falcon on Mutual when Damon became free-lance investigator and troubleshooter Michael Waring, also known as the Falcon. He remained on The Falcon until 1953, being replaced by actor George Petrie.

After Falcon, Damon reunited with his radio wife Claudia Morgan for a revamped version of Mutual's Abbott Mysteries which originally was broadcast from 1945–47 and originally starred, coincidentally, Les Tremayne and Alice Reinheart in the title roles of Pat and Jean Abbott. The Damon-Morgan version was broadcast on NBC and was renamed The Adventures of the Abbotts. The show, like its predecessor, was not very popular among listeners and only was broadcast eight months from October 3, 1954–June 12, 1955.

Damon continued making frequent appearances on radio up until the end of his life. Some of those radio programs included Lone Journey, Right to Happiness, ABC Mystery Theater, Dimension X, X Minus One and Yours Truly, Johnny Dollar. Damon made his last appearance on radio on the June 17, 1962 episode of Suspense entitled "Lunatic Hour". This episode was broadcast 34 days before Damon died.

== Television ==
The 1950s marked Damon's debut on television, with character roles in The Jackie Gleason Show, The Honeymooners, The Dick Powell Show, The New Breed, and Have Gun – Will Travel. Damon also garnered recurring roles on daytime television appearing on such soap operas as The Guiding Light, As The World Turns, Kitty Foyle, The Edge of Night, and Window on Main Street.

== Personal life ==
Damon was married to radio actress Ginger Jones. The two did several radio assignments together while Damon was stationed during World War II and married in November 1943 in San Antonio, Texas. Damon and Jones had one daughter named Lisa. They were married until Damon's death in 1962.

== Death ==
In July 1962, Damon was admitted into the UCLA Medical Center in Los Angeles. On July 21, Damon died of what was later determined to be a massive heart attack. He was 54. Damon is buried in Beverly National Cemetery in Beverly, New Jersey. Two months later in September of that year with the end of Suspense and Yours Truly, Johnny Dollar marked the end of the Golden Age of Radio. Damon's wife, Ginger, died on August 6, 2010, at 94. She is buried with her family in Kinderhook, Illinois.

== Filmography ==
=== Television ===
| Year | Title | Role | Notes |
|---|---|---|---|
| 1949 | Studio One | | 1 episode |
| 1952; 1956-1960 | The Guiding Light | Bruce Banning | Unknown episodes |
| 1953 | The Big Story | Robert L. Chase / Kleger | 2 episodes |
| 1953-1956 | Robert Montgomery Presents | Mose Higgins | 2 episodes |
| 1954-1957 | The Jackie Gleason Show | Various guest appearances | 6 episodes |
| 1955-1956 | The Honeymooners | Various guest appearances | 4 episodes |
| 1956-1957 | As the World Turns | James "Jim" Lowell, Jr. | Original cast |
| 1957-1958 | The Edge of Night | Asst. Dist. Attn. Ed Palmerlee | |
| 1957 | Decoy | Mr. Kitteridge | 1 episode |
| 1958 | Kitty Foyle | Rosie Rittenhouse | 1 episode |
| 1961 | Window on Main Street | Earl Greenough | 2 episodes |
| 1962 | Bus Stop | Stratton | 1 episode |
| 1962 | The Dick Powell Show | Mr. Somers | 1 episode |
| 1962 | The New Breed | Sumner Rath | 1 episode |
| 1962 | The Detectives | Carter | 1 episode |
| 1962 | Have Gun – Will Travel | Tilbury | 1 episode |

=== Radio ===
| Year | Title | Ref |
|---|---|---|
| 1941 | Lone Journey | |
| 1941-1943; 1946-1950 | The Adventures of the Thin Man | |
| 1942 | Great Plays | |
| 1943 | Words At War | |
| 1947 | The Right to Happiness | |
| 1947-1948 | The Adventures of Christopher Wells | |
| 1948 | Gang Busters | |
| 1948 | Cavalcade of America | |
| 1950 | Dimension X | |
| 1950 | The Big Story | |
| 1950-1953 | The Falcon | |
| 1951 | Now Hear This | |
| 1952 | Proudly We Hail | |
| 1954 | The FBI in Peace and War | |
| 1955 | The Adventures of the Abbotts | |
| 1955 | 21st Precinct | |
| 1955 | X Minus One | |
| 1959 | Suspense | |
| 1960 | The Right to Happiness | |
| 1960 | Yours Truly, Johnny Dollar | |
| 1962 | Suspense | |
