= Mandel Kramer =

American actor (1916–1989)

Mandell Kramer
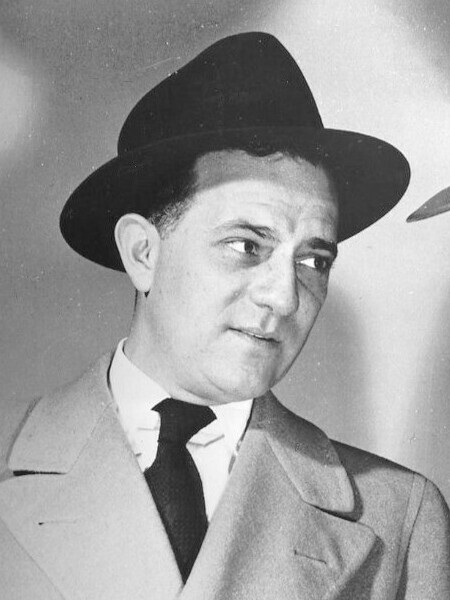
- Kramer in the TV rendering of the Counterspy radio show, 1952
- Born: March 12, 1916; Cleveland, Ohio, U.S.
- Died: January 29, 1989 (aged 72)
- Occupation: Actor
- Spouse: Ruth Valeche
- Children: 2

Mandel Kramer (March 12, 1916 – January 29, 1989) was an American actor. As a voice actor, he is best known as the last Johnny Dollar from Yours Truly, Johnny Dollar radio show.

== Early years ==
Kramer was born in Cleveland, Ohio, where his father had a shoe store, and attended Cleveland Heights High School. He also studied law at Case Western Reserve University for "a couple of years."

Kramer graduated from the American Academy of Dramatic Arts and acted for a year in the Cleveland Play House.

== Career ==
Kramer's first work in radio came at WTAM in his native Cleveland, Ohio.

For 20 years he played police chief Bill Marceau on the soap opera The Edge of Night a role he originated during the shows run on CBS from 1959–1975 & playing the part four years when the show moved to ABC from (1975–1979). His other roles in old-time radio included those shown in the table below. Kramer also appeared in 130 episodes of CBS Radio Mystery Theater between 1974 and 1982.

Program	Character
Backstage Wife	Tom Byron
Counterspy	Harry Peters
The Falcon	Sergeant Johnny Gleason
It's a Crime, Mr. Collins	Greg Collins
Mr. and Mrs. North	Mahatma McGloin
Perry Mason	Arthur Tragg
The Shadow	Shrevie
Stella Dallas	Sam Ellis
Yours Truly, Johnny Dollar	Johnny Dollar

He was also heard on Light of the World, Call the Police, Gang Busters, 21st Precinct, X Minus One and Inner Sanctum Mystery. He once said of his work on Gang Busters that after he began playing criminals, "I probably played more gangsters than anybody in the business for the next 10 or 15 years."

In later years he was often heard on CBS Radio Mystery Theater.

=== Television ===
Kramer played Bill Marceau in The Edge of Night on CBS. In 1976, he had become the longest-tenured member of the program's cast, having had the role of Marceau for 17 years. His work earned him a nomination for a Daytime Emmy Award for Supporting Actor in 1979.

== Personal life ==
In 1939, Kramer was engaged to Ruth Valeche, a fellow graduate of the American Academy of Dramatic Arts. They married and had two daughters, Kathryn and Susan.
