= ABC Mystery Theater =

Radio broadcast (1951 to 1954)

- Genre: Anthology/Crime drama
- Running time: 30 minutes
- Country of origin: United States
- Language: English
- Home station: ABC
- TV adaptations: Mystery Theater (also Mark Saber: Homicide Squad); The Vise (also Saber of London)
- Starring: Robert Carroll (season 1); Les Damon (seasons 2–3); Douglas Chandler (season 1); James Westerfield (season 1); Walter Burke (seasons 2–3)
- Announcer: Roger Foster
- Written by: Robert Tallman
- Original release: October 3, 1951 – June 30, 1954
- No. of series: 3
- No. of episodes: 115

ABC Mystery Theater, also known as just simply Mystery Theater or Mystery Theatre, is an American radio anthology, crime and mystery series from the 1950s. The program starred originally, Robert Carroll in the title role of Inspector Mark Saber, a British detective from the Homicide Squad then by Les Damon for seasons two and three. The program also centered on Saber's assistant Sgt. Tim Maloney, originally portrayed by character actor James Westerfield for the first half of season one, Douglas Chandler for the second half of season one and finally by character actor Walter Burke for seasons two and three.

The program was broadcast over the ABC for 115 episodes and three seasons from October 3, 1951–June 30, 1954.

While ABC Radio broadcast ABC Mystery Theater, ABC Television broadcast a program with the same format, storyline, plot and characters entitled Mystery Theater which starred Tom Conway as Mark Saber. This too ran through June 1954.

Afterwards, the television series was given a reboot and retitled The Vise. It premiered in December 1955 on ABC, and was later moved to NBC and retitled Saber of London in 1957 where it ran through 1960.

== Overview ==
ABC Mystery Theater was broadcast from 1951 to 1954, with two original seasons of scripts and one season of repeats from the second season. Season one introduced Inspector Mark Saber of the Homicide Squad and his able assistant, Sergeant Tim Maloney. For season one, character actor Robert Carroll was heard as Inspector Mark Saber. Sergeant Tim Maloney was portrayed by James Westerfield then Douglas Chandler. For seasons two and three, Les Damon, of radio's The Adventures of the Falcon and The Adventures of the Thin Man played the part of Inspector Saber and Walter Burke played the part of Sgt. Maloney.

== Synopsis ==
ABC Mystery Theater premiered on October 3, 1951, to fairly neutral reviews. The program introduced listeners to the work life of Mark Saber. Saber is the senior inspector in a large metropolitan city's Homicide Squad. Most viewers and critics felt as though the concept of a different murder every week would eventually get old. But despite the negative reviews, ABC radio ordered a second season of episodes to premiere in the fall of 1952.

During its first season, ABC Mystery Theater ran directly against the similarly themed CBS Mystery Theatre. During its second season, the program was put up against CBS's Hearthstone of The Death Squad. Hearthstone of the Death Squad reproduced broadcasts from the two years of CBS Mystery Theatre repackaged as their own series. The immediate similarities were obvious among listeners such as CBS's "Death Squad" vs ABC's Homicide Squad, CBS's "Inspector" vs ABC's Inspector and the metropolitan murders which were the plots for each episode of both programs. They often ran on the same day and in some instances in the same time slot. In the end, listeners were getting weary of both CBS's Hearthstone and ABC's Mystery Theater and their similarities and neither of the two stories survived the 1952–1953 radio season.

The series ran for another season in which the episodes were just slightly modified versions of second season broadcasts and the program finally concluded on June 30, 1954, after its 115th broadcast.

== Television ==
ABC Mystery Theater
- Also known as: Mark Saber Mystery Theater; Inspector Mark Saber – Homicide Squad
- Genre: crime drama
- Based on: ABC Mystery Theater
- Starring: Tom Conway; James Burke
- Country of origin: United States
- Original language: English
- No. of seasons: 3
- No. of episodes: 64

Production
- Executive producer: Ronald D. Reed
- Producer: J. Donald Wilson
- Running time: 30 minutes

Original release
- Network: ABC
- Release: October 5, 1951 – June 1954

Related
- The Vise, Saber of London

Two days after ABC Mystery Theater premiered on the radio, Mystery Theater premiered on the ABC Television Network. It aired on Fridays prime time at p.m. EST, against CBS's Mama, and NBC's Quiz Kids, and in April 1952 was moved to 9:30 p.m. on Wednesdays. For the 1952–53 television season, it was retitled Inspector Mark Saber – Homicide Squad and aired on 8 p.m. on Mondays, where it competed against CBS Lux Video Theatre and NBC What's My Name? For the 1953–54 television season, it was moved to 7:30 p.m on Wednesdays.

In the televised series, Mark Saber (portrayed by Tom Conway), a British homicide detective who works in the homicide department of a large American city and his trusty assistant, Sergeant Tim Maloney (portrayed by James Burke).

The series concluded in June 1954.

=== Reboot ===
In December 1955, the television series was given a reboot under the name The Vise and starred Donald Gray as Saber. In 1957, it switched to NBC and retitled Saber of London, when it aired at 7:30 p.m. EST on Fridays, opposite Leave It to Beaver, then on CBS, and The Adventures of Rin Tin Tin on ABC. In the 1958–1959 season, Saber of London switched to 7 p.m. Sundays, opposite CBS's Lassie. In its last year, 1959–1960, it was moved a half-hour earlier just outside prime time to 6:30 p.m. on Sundays.

In this iteration, Saber was no longer a US-based policeman, but now a one-armed private investigator operating from London. (Gray's left arm had been amputated in WWII). Gone was Sgt. Maloney, replaced by a succession of different sidekicks. Like its predecessor, The Vise went through various title changes including: Saber of London, Saber of Scotland Yard, and simply Mark Saber.
