= It's a Crime =

It's a Crime may refer to:

- It's a Crime (play-by-mail game)
- "It's a Crime" (Mario song)
- "It's a Crime", a 1999 song by the Magnetic Fields from 69 Love Songs

== See also ==
- It's a Crime, Mr. Collins, a radio program
