= Hans Conried =

American actor (1917–1982)

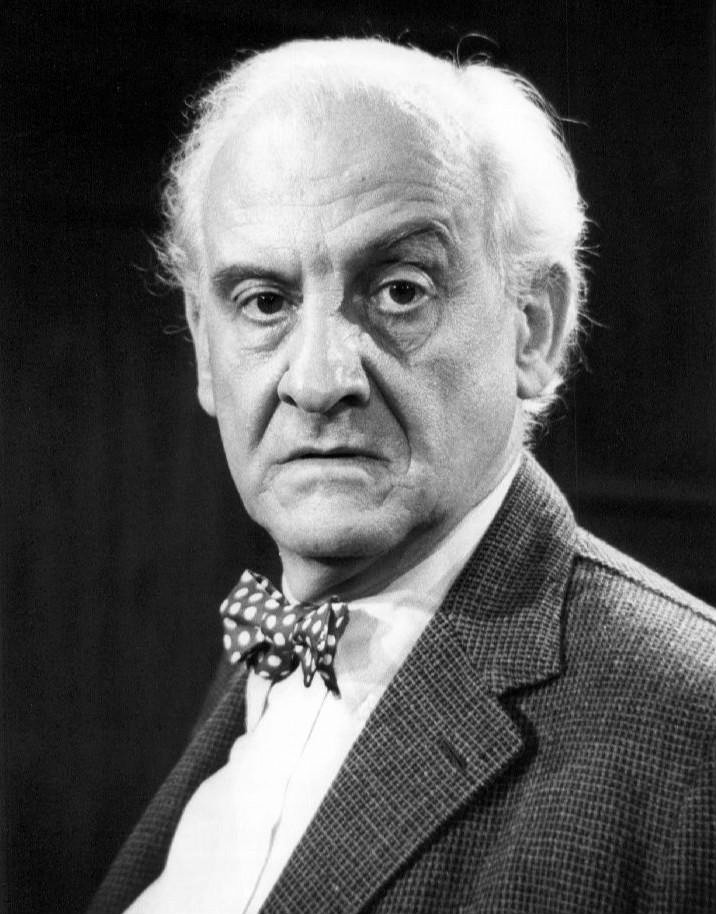
- Conried in The Tony Randall Show (1977)
- Born: Hans Georg Conried Jr. April 15, 1917; Baltimore, Maryland, U.S.
- Died: January 5, 1982 (aged 64); Burbank, California, U.S.
- Education: Columbia University
- Occupations: Actor; comedian
- Years active: 1937–1981
- Spouse: Margaret Grant (m. 1942)
- Children: 4

Hans Georg Conried Jr. (April 15, 1917 – January 5, 1982) was an American actor and comedian. Among his numerous roles, he is best known for voicing Captain Hook and George Darling in Walt Disney's Peter Pan (1953), Snidely Whiplash in Jay Ward's Dudley Do-Right cartoons, and Professor Waldo P. Wigglesworth in Ward's Hoppity Hooper cartoons. Conried was host of Ward's live-action Fractured Flickers show, and had a recurring role as Professor Kropotkin in the radio and film versions of My Friend Irma. He also appeared as Uncle Tonoose on the Danny Thomas sitcom Make Room for Daddy, twice on I Love Lucy, and as the Mad Hatter in The Alphabet Conspiracy (1959).

== Early life ==
Conried was born on April 15, 1917, in Baltimore, Maryland, to parents Edith Beryl (née Gildersleeve, 1892–1970) and Hans Georg Conried (1883–1957). His Connecticut-born mother was a descendant of Pilgrims, and his father was a Jewish immigrant from Vienna, Austria. He was raised in Baltimore and in New York City.

== Career ==
Conried studied acting at Columbia University and went on to play major classical roles onstage. This led him into radio in 1937, when he appeared in a supporting role in a broadcast of The Taming of the Shrew on KECA in Los Angeles, California. Four years later, a newspaper reported about his role on Hedda Hopper's Hollywood: "But at the mic, he's equally convincing as old men, drunks, dialeticians, or Shakesperean tragedians. Miss Hopper favors him for her dramatizations when the script will allow him, as she puts it, 'to have his head.'" Impressed with Conried's versatility, a scout for Metro-Goldwyn-Mayer signed him as a character player in 1938. He was in eight radio performances of Cavalcade of America.

Conried's early screen roles were incidental bits, usually comic but sometimes shady or cowardly, depending on the context. He stayed with MGM until 1941, then began freelancing. His first major featured role was at Columbia Pictures as a worldly, architectural visionary who disrupted the household in Blondie's Blessed Event (1942). That established him as a comic figure in feature films. His Germanic surname got him cast as enemy agents in many wartime films, and he became a dialect specialist.

During World War II, Conried enlisted in the U.S. Army in September 1944. He trained at Fort Knox as a tank crewman until the army decided he was too tall. He became a heavy mortar crewman then was sent to the Philippines as an engineer laborer until fellow actor Jack Kruschen obtained his release for service with the Armed Forces Radio Network.

Conried remained active in radio during the 1940s and 1950s. He was in the regular cast of Orson Welles' Ceiling Unlimited, for which he wrote the December 14, 1942, episode, "War Workers". On The George Burns and Gracie Allen Show, he played a psychiatrist whom George regularly consults for help in dealing with the ditzy Gracie. Conried also provided various characters on The Phil Harris-Alice Faye Show, including portraying one of Phil Harris' writers.

Conried was also a regular on the CBS Radio program Life with Luigi, portraying Schultz, a German classmate. He also played occasional dialect roles on CBS's detective series Yours Truly, Johnny Dollar.

Even as a younger man, Conried appeared much older than his actual age and he was frequently cast as middle-aged or even elderly pompous, scholarly types. His impeccable diction and inimitable growl were well suited to the roles he played, whether portraying the dim Professor Kropotkin on the radio show My Friend Irma or as comic villains and mock-sinister or cranky types. In 1949, while filming the movie version of My Friend Irma, character actor Felix Bressart, cast as Professor Kropotkin, died suddenly during production. Conried, who played Kropotkin on radio, stepped in to finish the picture. Most of the finished film features Bressart with Conried's voice overdubbed; Conried appears in a few scenes in identical costume and makeup, with his voice used throughout.

Hans Conried's first leading film role was the independent science fiction comedy The Twonky in 1953. Two years later, Conried appeared as a riverboat gambler in Davy Crockett, King of the Wild Frontier.

== Dr. Seuss ==
Theodor Geisel, better known as children's author Dr. Seuss, was preparing a documentary feature largely made up of captured Japanese newsreel footage, Design for Death (1948). Geisel hired actor Kent Smith as the "American" narrator, and Hans Conried as the "Japanese" narrator. The film won an Academy Award.

Geisel remembered Conried when he was preparing an expensive Technicolor fantasy, The 5,000 Fingers of Dr. T. (1953), which included the dominant role of a demanding, dictatorial piano teacher. Conried was cast as the foreboding "Dr. Terwilliker" and turned in a bravura performance that might have changed his career. Unfortunately, the film was a costly failure. In 1970, Conried reflected on the film's poor box-office take in an interview with Leonard Maltin: "The picture never made its print money back. It was comparable only to Wilson as one of the great money-losers of all time; it would stop conversation for some years at any Hollywood social gathering."

The film's financial failure didn't affect Conried's working relationship with Geisel, who went on to cast him in three Dr. Seuss television specials. One of them was the 1977 Halloween TV special by DePattie-Frelong Enterprises, Halloween is Grinch Night, where Conried voiced both the Narrator and the Grinch, a role originated in 1966 by Boris Karloff in How the Grinch Stole Christmas. In 1981, Conried was set to reprise his role as the Grinch for The Grinch Grinches the Cat in the Hat, but he was in poor health and died early in 1982. Voice actor Bob Holt took over the role.

== Cartoons ==
Conried's colorful voice gained him much work in animated cartoons, such as Disney and Jay Ward. His prominent work for Disney was in Walt Disney's Peter Pan where he voiced and provided live-action reference for both Captain Hook and Mr. Darling (following the tradition of having both characters portrayed by the same actor). He then went on to pose live-action movesets and audition for Aurora's father, King Stefan, in another Disney animated film, Sleeping Beauty, but the voice role of Stefan was officially taken by Taylor Holmes for the film's final cut. Nevertheless, Conried hosted several episodes of Walt Disney's Wonderful World of Color as the Magic Mirror from Snow White and the Seven Dwarfs.

He supplied the storybook narration for MGM's Johann Mouse, the 1952 Academy Award for Best Short Subject: Cartoons, the seventh and last Oscar given to a Tom and Jerry short.

Conried also became a charter member of the Jay Ward-Bill Scott stock company. He voiced the character of Snidely Whiplash in the Dudley Do-Right segments of The Rocky and Bullwinkle Show, and Professor Waldo P. Wigglesworth on Hoppity Hooper.

Ward and Scott also cast him as the live-action host of Fractured Flickers, a wildly satirical, tongue-in-cheek redub of silent movies. During that show he had a tightly scripted segment where he absurdly interviewed guest stars and celebrities, while usually mistaking their identities, misunderstanding answers, taking umbrage or getting into mock disagreements.

He also voiced Wally Walrus on The Woody Woodpecker Show and Dr. Dred on Drak Pack. According to the DVD commentary of Futurama, he was the inspiration for the voice created for Robot Devil.

== Television ==
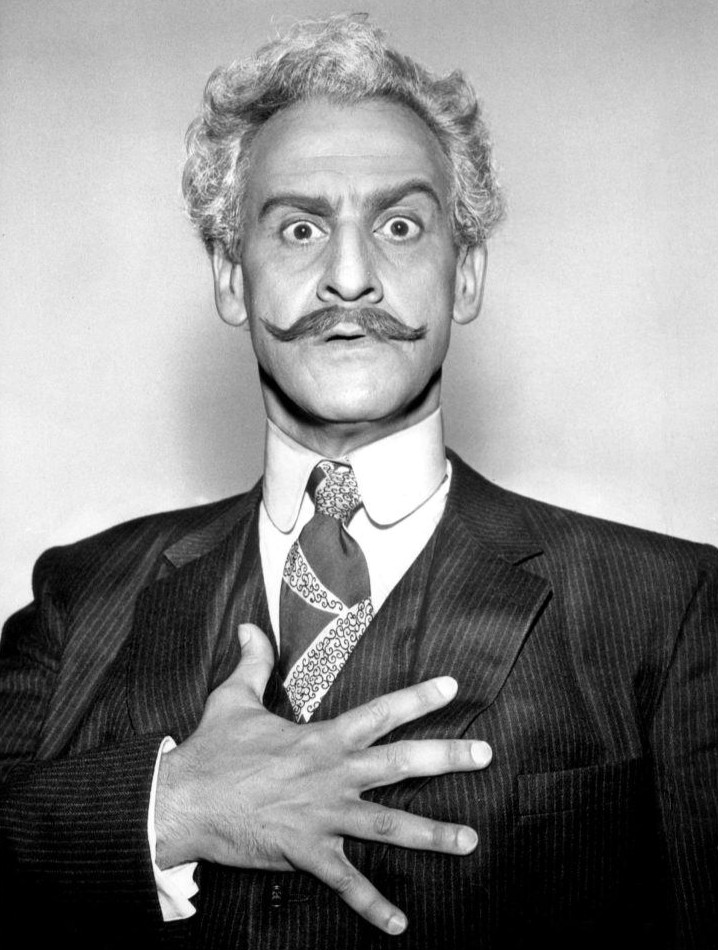
Conried as the grumpy Uncle Tonoose, a recurring role he played on Make Room for Daddy

From 1955 to 1964, Conried made 19 guest appearances as "Uncle Tonoose" in Make Room for Daddy on ABC and then CBS, and four appearances as other characters.

He was featured in the 1958 episode, "What Makes Opera Grand?", on the anthology series Omnibus. The episode, an analysis by Leonard Bernstein, showing the powerful effect of music in opera, featured Conried as Marcello in a spoken dramatization of Act III of Puccini's La Bohème. The program demonstrated the effect of the music in La Bohème by having actors speak portions of the libretto in English, followed by opera singers singing the same lines in the original Italian.

Conried was a regular guest on Jack Paar's Tonight Show from 1959 to 1962. He was a regular panelist on the pantomime program Stump the Stars and a semi-regular guest on the Ernie Kovacs-hosted game show Take a Good Look.

In 1977, Conried joined the cast for the second and final season of The Tony Randall Show in the recurring role of Judge Franklin's irascible father, Wyatt.

His many guest appearances included I Love Lucy, Davy Crockett, The Californians, Hey, Jeannie!, The Ray Milland Show, The DuPont Show with June Allyson, The Real McCoys, Mister Ed, The Islanders, Ben Casey, Dr. Kildare, Lost in Space, Daniel Boone, The Beverly Hillbillies, The Lucy Show, The Monkees, Have Gun – Will Travel, Love, American Style, Here's Lucy, Kolchak, Alice, Laverne & Shirley, The Love Boat, Hogan's Heroes, Match Game, Maverick, The Donna Reed Show, Fantasy Island and Quark. On Gilligan's Island, he appeared in two episodes as the confused pilot Wrong Way Feldman, one of the show's few recurring characters.

=== Stage appearances ===
Conried made his Broadway debut in the Cole Porter musical Can-Can, where he played a struggling artist and sang two musical numbers. In 1971, he appeared in 70, Girls, 70 and two years later was a replacement performer in the revival of Irene starring Debbie Reynolds.

== Personal life and death ==
Conried married Margaret Grant on January 29, 1942; they had four children.

Conried had a long history of heart problems and had a stroke in 1974 and a mild heart attack in 1979. He remained active until his death on January 5, 1982, one day after suffering a major heart attack. His body was donated to medical science.

== Filmography ==
- Dramatic School (1938) as Ramy
- Never Say Die (1939) Bit Part (uncredited)
- It's a Wonderful World (1939) as Delmonico, Stage Manager
- On Borrowed Time (1939) as Man in Convertible (uncredited)
- Dulcy (1940) as Vincent Leach
- The Great Dictator (1940) as Undetermined Role (uncredited)
- Bitter Sweet (1940) as Rudolph – Man at Mama Luden's (uncredited)
- Maisie Was a Lady (1941) as Georgie Porgie – House Guest (uncredited)
- Abdul the Bulbul-Ameer (1941, short subject) as Abdul (voice, uncredited)
- They Met in Argentina (1941) as Guitar Player in Cantina (uncredited)
- Underground (1941) as Herman – Underground Member (uncredited)
- Unexpected Uncle (1941) as Clayton – Manager at Brocks (uncredited)
- Weekend for Three (1941) as Desk Clerk
- More About Nostradamus (1941) (uncredited)
- The Gay Falcon (1941) as Herman (uncredited)
- A Date with the Falcon (1942) as Desk Clerk (uncredited)
- Joan of Paris (1942) as Second Gestapo Agent (uncredited)
- Blondie's Blessed Event (1942) as George Wickley
- Saboteur (1942) as Edward (uncredited)
- The Wife Takes a Flyer (1942) as Hendrik Woverman
- Pacific Rendezvous (1942) as Park Hotel Desk Clerk (uncredited)
- The Falcon Takes Over (1942) as Quincey W. Marriot (uncredited)
- The Big Street (1942) as Louie – Headwaiter (uncredited)
- The Greatest Gift (1942, short subject) as Father Fabian (uncredited)
- Once Upon a Honeymoon (1942) as Vienna Tailor's Fitter (uncredited)
- Nightmare (1942) as Hans – Nazi Agent
- Underground Agent (1942) as Hugo
- Hitler's Children (1943) as Dr. Graf
- Journey into Fear (1943) as Swami Magician
- Hostages (1943) as Lt. Glasenapp
- A Lady Takes a Chance (1943) as Gregg Stone
- Crazy House (1943) as Roco
- His Butler's Sister (1943) as Reeves
- Passage to Marseille (1944) as Jourdain (uncredited)
- Mrs. Parkington (1944) as Mr. Ernst
- Sliphorn King of Polaroo (1945, short subject) as Narrator / Crocodile (voice)
- Woody Dines Out (1945, short subject) as Taxidermist (voice, uncredited)
- The Reckless Driver (1946, short subject) as Wally Walrus (one line “Ooooohh, I hurt my wittle hand!”) (voice, uncredited)
- The Senator Was Indiscreet (1947) as Waiter
- Variety Time (1948) as Rudy La Paix
- Design for Death (1948) as Narrator (Japanese)
- The Barkleys of Broadway (1949) as Ladislaus Ladi
- My Friend Irma (1949) as Prof. Kropotkin
- Bride for Sale (1949) as Jewelry Salesman (uncredited)
- On the Town (1949) as François – Head Waiter (uncredited)
- Nancy Goes to Rio (1950) as Alfredo
- Summer Stock (1950) as Harrison I. Keath
- One Hour in Wonderland (1950) as Slave in the Magic Mirror
- New Mexico (1951) as Abraham Lincoln
- Rich, Young and Pretty (1951) as Jean – Maitre D'
- Behave Yourself! (1951) as Norbert 'Gillie the Blade' Gillespie
- Texas Carnival (1951) as Hotel Clerk
- Too Young to Kiss (1951) as Mr. Sparrow
- I'll See You in My Dreams (1951) as William Rossiter (uncredited)
- The Light Touch (1951) as Leopold (uncredited)
- The World in His Arms (1952) as Eustace – Hotel Clerk
- Walt Disney Christmas Show (1951) as Slave in the Magic Mirror
- 3 for Bedroom C (1952) as Jack Bleck – Press Agent
- Big Jim McLain (1952) as Robert Henried
- I Love Lucy (1952) as English Professor Mr. Livermore and as junk dealer
- Peter Pan (1953) as Captain Hook / Mr. George Darling / Lookout Pirate (voice)
- Johann Mouse (1953, short subject) as Narrator (voice)
- The Emperor's New Clothes (1953, short subject) as Tailors / King / King's Aide / Jacob (voice)
- Siren of Bagdad (1953) as Ben Ali
- The Twonky (1953) as Kerry West
- The 5,000 Fingers of Dr. T (1953) as Dr. Terwilliker
- The Affairs of Dobie Gillis (1953) as Professor Amos Pomfritt
- Ben and Me (1953, short subject) as Thomas Jefferson / Crook (voice)
- Davy Crockett, King of the Wild Frontier (1955) as Thimblerig
- The Miracle on 34th Street (1955) as Mr. Shellhammer [TV adaptation]
- You're Never Too Young (1955) as François (uncredited)
- The Birds and the Bees (1956) as Duc Jacques de Montaigne
- Bus Stop (1956) as Life Magazine Photographer
- Carnival in Munich (1956, short subject) as Narrator
- The Story of Anyburg U.S.A. (1957, short subject) as Prosecutor (voice, uncredited)
- The Monster That Challenged the World (1957) as Dr. Jess Rogers
- Jet Pilot (1957) as Colonel Matoff (originally filmed in 1949)
- The Big Beat (1958) as Vladimir Skilsky
- Maverick (1958) (episode – Black Fire) as Homer Eakins
- Rock-A-Bye Baby (1958) as Mr. Wright
- Sleeping Beauty (1959) as King Stefan (demo voice/live-action reference)
- Juke Box Rhythm (1959) as Balenko
- The Real McCoys (1959) (episode – The Actor) as Sterling Ames
- The Alphabet Conspiracy (1959) as Mad Hatter
- 1001 Arabian Nights (1959) as The Wicked Wazir / Magic Flame (voice)
- The Magic Fountain (1961) as Otto the Owl (voice)
- The Bullwinkle Show (1961–1965) as Snidely Whiplash (voice)
- Mister Ed (1962) (episode – Ed and Paul Revere) as Igor
- Fractured Flickers (1963–1964, 26 episodes) as Host
- My Six Loves (1963) as Kinsley Kross
- Robin and the 7 Hoods (1964) as Mr. Ricks – Architect (uncredited)
- The Patsy (1964) as Prof. Mulerr
- Gilligan's Island (1964–1965, 2 episodes) as Wrongway Feldman
- Hoppity Hooper (1961, 1963–1967, 104 episodes) as Professor Waldo Wigglesworth (voice)
- Hogan's Heroes (1966, episode #15) as Major Bonacelli
- Lost in Space (1967, 1 episode) as Sagramonte
- The Cricket on the Hearth (1967) as Tackleton (voice)
- The Monkees (1968, TV) (episode – Monkee's Paw) as Mendrek the Magician
- Wake Me When the War Is Over (1969, TV) as Professor Herman Erhardt
- The Phantom Tollbooth (1970) as King Azaz/The Mathemagician (voice)
- Horton Hears a Who! (1970) as Narrator/Horton/Dr. H. Hoovey (voice)
- O'Hara, U.S. Treasury (1972) (episode – Operation: Dorias) as Count Anton Brelius
- Dr. Seuss on the Loose (1973) as Narrator/North-going Zax/South-going Zax (voice)
- The Brothers O'Toole (1973) as Polonius Vandergelt
- Amazing Grace (1974) as Gov. Andy Wallace
- Kolchak: The Night Stalker (1975) (episode – The Knightly Murders) as Mendel Boggs
- The Shaggy D.A. (1976) as Professor Whatley
- The Magic Pony (1977) as Spalnik (voice)
- The Hobbit (1977) as Thorin Oakenshield (voice)
- Halloween Is Grinch Night (1977) as The Grinch/Narrator (voice)
- Quark (1977) as The Source (voice)
- The Cat from Outer Space (1978) as Dr. Heffel
- Every Girl Should Have One (1978) as Various (voices)
- Alice (1979, 2 episodes) as Randolph Briggs
- The Love Boat (1979) S2 E18 as Karl Schmidt
- Oh, God! Book II (1980) as Dr. Barnes
- Drak Pack (1980, 16 episodes) as Dr. Dread (voice)
- Scruffy (1980) as Joe Tibbles/Solo the Scottish Terrier (voice)
- Faeries (1981) as Faerie King/Shadow (voice)
- The Trolls and the Christmas Express (1981) as Troglo (voice)
- Spider-Man and His Amazing Friends (1981) as Chameleon (voice)
- Miss Switch to the Rescue (1982) as Mordo, the Warlock (voice) (final appearance)
- Barefoot in the Park (1982) as Victor Velasco (TV stage production with Richard Thomas, Bess Armstrong, Barbara Barrie, and James Cromwell)
