= The Falcon (fictional detective) =

Fictional character created in 1940 by Michael Arlen

Gay Stanhope Falcon/Gay Laurence/Tom Laurence/Michael "Mike" Waring
- First appearance: The Falcon's Prey (Michael Waring); Gay Falcon (Gay Falcon)
- Created by: Drexel Drake (Michael Waring); Michael Arlen (Gay Falcon)
- Portrayed by: George Sanders (film); Tom Conway (film); Barry Kroeger (radio); James Meighan (radio); Les Tremayne (radio); Les Damon (radio); George Petrie (radio); John Calvert (film); Charles McGraw (television)

In-universe information
- Gender: Male
- Occupation: Private detective
- Nationality: British

The Falcon is the nickname for two fictional detectives. Michael Waring, alias the Falcon, is a freelance investigator and troubleshooter created by Drexel Drake (real name Charles H. Huff) in his 1936 novel, The Falcon's Prey. It was followed by two more novels—The Falcon Cuts In (1937) and The Falcon Meets a Lady (1938)—and a 1938 short story, "The Falcon Strikes".

Michael Arlen created Gay Stanhope Falcon in 1940. This Falcon made his first appearance in Arlen's short story "Gay Falcon" (also known as "A Man Called Falcon"), which was originally published in 1940 in Town & Country magazine. The story opens with the words "Now of this man who called himself Gay Falcon many tales are told, and this is one of them." Arlen's Falcon is characterized as a freelance adventurer and troubleshooter—a man who makes his living "keeping his mouth shut and engaging in dangerous enterprises."

== Film appearances ==
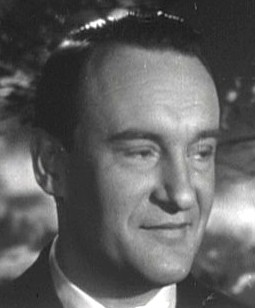
George Sanders, original star of The Falcon film series

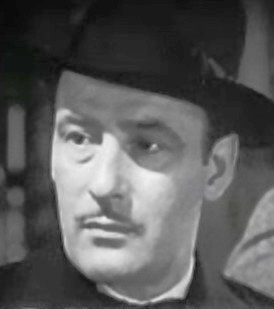
Sanders' brother, Tom Conway, replaced Sanders as The Falcon partway through the series

Arlen's Falcon was quickly brought to the screen by RKO Radio Pictures. The 1941 film The Gay Falcon redefined the character as a suave English gentleman detective with a weakness for beautiful women. Though Gay Falcon was the character's name in Arlen's original story, the character was renamed Gay Laurence for the film. (The surname was spelled "Lawrence" in subsequent films.) Thus "The Falcon" became an alias or nickname, à la "The Saint." In later outings, in various media, the character had a variety of "real names," still being known as The Falcon. Neither in films nor on radio was the nickname ever explained.

The Gay Falcon was intended to establish a replacement character for Leslie Charteris's The Saint (Simon Templar), who had appeared in a popular RKO film series. To that end, George Sanders, star of The Saint series, was cast in the Falcon role, with "Saint" love interest Wendy Barrie continuing opposite Sanders. In the Falcon movies, as in the Leslie Charteris "Saint" novels of the period, the hero is almost always accompanied in his travels by a wisecracking sidekick, portrayed variously by Allen Jenkins (in the first three Falcon films), Don Barclay, Cliff Edwards, Edward Brophy, and Vince Barnett.

The new Falcon films followed the "Saint" pattern so closely that author Charteris sued RKO, charging unfair competition. Charteris told author David Zinman in 1971, "RKO switched to The Falcon, a flagrant carbon copy of their version of The Saint, in my opinion with the single mercenary motive of saving the payments they had to make to me for the film rights." Charteris actually pokes fun at The Falcon in his 1943 novel The Saint Steps In, with a character making a metafictional reference to the Falcon being "a bargain-basement imitation" of The Saint.

George Sanders appeared in the first four Falcon features. When Sanders tired of B leads, he bowed out of the series in The Falcon's Brother (1942). In the film, Gay Lawrence is killed by assassins, prompting his brother Tom, played by Sanders's actual older brother, Tom Conway, to become the new Falcon. Producer Maurice Geraghty later revealed that RKO executives had recruited Conway simply as a way to induce Sanders to make one more Falcon picture, after which the series would end. "So it was astonishing to them when Tom Conway caught on right away and carried the series on – even outgrossing the pictures George had made." After The Falcon's Brother, Conway starred in nine more Falcon films through 1946.

As with other series of B mystery films, the plot of a Falcon movie generally revolved around a particular locale that the detective was visiting. An oft-used gimmick in the Falcon series was to tack "teaser" epilogues onto the ends of films. In each teaser, a previously unseen woman would approach the Falcon, usually in desperation, and signal the title and locale of his next movie. A teaser rarely had anything to do with the plot of the upcoming film, since that film had not yet been produced.

The Falcon was revived for three more films, all made in 1948, but these featured the earlier "Michael Waring" character as created by Drexel Drake. However, he was referred to as "Watling" and the credits still claimed he was based on a character created by Michael Arlen. Actor-magician John Calvert played "The New Falcon" in three low-budget features produced by Film Classics. The character went on to appear (as Michael Waring) in radio and television – Charles McGraw portrayed the Falcon in the 39-episode syndicated television series Adventures of the Falcon (1954–55).

== Film series ==
- Starring George Sanders as Gay Lawrence
  - The Gay Falcon (1941)
  - A Date with the Falcon (1942)
  - The Falcon Takes Over (1942) (based on Raymond Chandler's Farewell, My Lovely)
- Starring George Sanders and Tom Conway as the Lawrence brothers; Gay is murdered and Tom Lawrence, his brother, becomes The Falcon
  - The Falcon's Brother (1942)
- Starring Tom Conway as Tom Lawrence
  - The Falcon Strikes Back (1943)
  - The Falcon in Danger (1943)
  - The Falcon and the Co-eds (1943)
  - The Falcon Out West (1944)
  - The Falcon in Mexico (1944)
  - The Falcon in Hollywood (1944)
  - The Falcon in San Francisco (1945)
  - The Falcon's Alibi (1946)
  - The Falcon's Adventure (1946)
- Starring John Calvert as Michael Waring
  - Devil's Cargo (1948)
  - Appointment with Murder (1948)
  - Search for Danger (1949)

== See also ==
- The Falcon (radio series)
