= Lone Journey (radio soap opera) =

American radio soap opera (1940–1952)

- Running time: 15 minutes
- Country of origin: United States
- Language: English
- Syndicates: NBC, CBS, ABC
- Written by: Sandra Michael and Peter Michael
- Original release: May 27, 1940 – June 27, 1952

Lone Journey is an American soap opera radio program.

== Information ==
Lone Journey debuted on May 27, 1940, on NBC. The show was called, "the distinguished American radio novel" and was advertised as "thrilling romance on a Montana ranch". Notably, the show did not make much use of cliffhangers to lure viewers in. The show used Montana as its setting and was based on real people and real situations that the show's writers, Sandra Michael and Peter Michael, had experienced. Sandra had prior experience writing the radio daytime soap opera Against the Storm.

== Plot ==
Wolfe Bennett and wife Nita are unhappy with their lives in Chicago. They decide to make a change and purchase the "Spear T-Ranch" in Judith Mountain, Montana.

== Broadcast history ==
- May 27, 1940 - June 25, 1943 - NBC, weekdays at 5:15 p.m.
- 1941-42 - NBC, weekdays at 11:30 a.m.
- 1942-43 - Dreft, weekdays at 10:45 a.m.
- April 1, 1946 - September 26, 1947, weekdays at 10 a.m.
- September 30, 1946 - CBS and Carnation, weekdays at 2:30 p.m.
- July 2, 1951 - June 27, 1952 - ABC and Lever Brothers, weekdays at various times between 11a.m. and noon

== Cast ==
The main characters had a variety of actors play their roles throughout the show's history:

- Wolfe Bennett was played by Les Damon, Staats Cotsworth (1946–47, 1951–52), Henry Hunter and Reese Taylor
- Nita Bennett was played by Claudia Morgan, Betty Ruth Smith, Eloise Kummer and Betty Winkler
- Mel Tanner was played by Wylie Adams and DeWin Mcbride
- Enor was played by Cameron Andrews and Bob Jellison
- Wolfe's mother was played by Nancy Osgood
- Sydney Sherwood was played by Charlotte Holland and Laurette Fillbrandt
- Lance McKenzie was played by John Larkin

Lone Journey's announcers included Durward Kirby, Nelson Case, Richard Stark and Charles Woods

== See also ==
- List of radio soaps
