= Abbott Mysteries =

- Other names: The Abbott Mysteries; The Adventures of the Abbotts
- Genre: Comedy-mystery
- Running time: 30 minutes
- Country of origin: United States
- Language(s): English
- Syndicates: Mutual; NBC
- Starring: Charles Webster; Les Tremayne; Les Damon; Julie Stevens; Alice Reinheart; Claudia Morgan
- Announcer: Frank Gallup; Cy Harris
- Created by: Frances Crane
- Written by: Ed Adamson; Howard Merrill
- Directed by: Roger Bower; Carlo De Angelo
- Original release: June 10, 1945 – June 12, 1955
- Sponsored by: Helbros Watch Company

Abbott Mysteries is a comedy-mystery radio program adapted from the novels of Frances Crane (1896-1981). Initially a summer replacement for Quick As a Flash, the series was heard on Mutual and NBC between the years 1945 and 1955.

The Mutual series, sponsored by Helbros Watches, debuted June 10, 1945, airing Sundays at 6 p.m. The scripts by Howard Merrill and Ed Adamson were in the lighthearted tradition of Mr. and Mrs. North. Julie Stevens and Charles Webster starred as Jean and Pat Abbott, a San Francisco married couple "who were habitually involved in various sorts of mayhem and in solving murders." In the supporting cast were Jean Ellyn, Sydney Slon and Luis van Rooten.

Moving to 5:30 p.m.in 1946, Les Tremayne and Alice Reinheart took over the roles until the end of the series on August 31, 1947.

Seven years later, the characters returned October 3, 1954, on NBC in The Adventures of the Abbotts, broadcast on NBC Sunday evenings at 8:30 p.m. In this series, the Abbotts were portrayed by Claudia Morgan and Les Damon. The NBC series ran until June 12, 1955.

Announcers were Frank Gallop and Cy Harrice. Albert Burhman's orchestra provided music.

"The series was resurrected by NBC in 1955 under the new title of The Adventures of the Abbotts and this nudged Mutual into producing a copycat show under the title It's A Crime, Mr. Collins." "Many programs in the Golden Age of Radio were flattered by their competitors. ... The Abbotts on NBC were copied exactly in Mutual's It's A Crime, Mr. Collins, including paraphrasing (the original author's) words." "Mutual even used ... the habit of putting a color in the title of every story."

== Sources ==
- French, Jack. Private Eyelashes: Radio's Lady Detectives. Albany, Georgia: BearManor Media, 2004. ISBN 978-0-9714570-8-9.
