= Yellowneck =

1955 film

- Theatrical release poster
- Directed by: R. John Hugh
- Screenplay by: Nat S. Linden
- Story by: R. John Hugh
- Produced by: Harlow G. Fredrick (executive producer)
- Starring: Lin McCarthy; Stephen Courtleigh; Berry Kroeger; Harold Gordon
- Cinematography: Charles T. O'Rork
- Edited by: William A. Slade
- Music by: Laurence Rosenthal
- Production company: Empire Studios
- Distributed by: Republic Pictures
- Release date: March 22, 1955 (United States)
- Running time: 83 minutes
- Country: United States
- Language: English

Yellowneck is a 1955 American Civil War film directed by R. John Hugh and starring Lin McCarthy, Stephen Courtleigh, Berry Kroeger and Harold Gordon. It tells the story of five deserters from the Confederate Army who make their way past the Everglades and angry Seminole Indians, in an attempt to get to the Florida coast and then to Cuba.

The film was made in Trucolor and released by Republic Pictures. The title refers to a Confederate word for a deserter.

== Plot ==
It is the Florida Everglades in 1863. Four deserters of the Confederate Army—Sergeant Todd, Plunkett, Cockney and the Kid—are hiding out. The Colonel, a fellow deserter, appears from the brush with a note from an Indian who has arranged to take him to the ocean so he may be taken to Cuba. When the Indian guide is found killed by Seminoles, the foursome reluctantly join forces with the Colonel in order to reach the coast and ride out the rest of the Civil War.

As the group treks through the dangerous Florida everglades, it's revealed that Plunkett has stolen a large amount of gold from the Confederate army, which Cockney wants to steal from him. The group continues its trek, and it is revealed Cockney is drop-dead afraid of snakes, and being in close contact with them sends him into a paralyzed state. Cockney also reveals that the Colonel deserted after giving drunk orders during the Battle of Murfreesboro, leading to a slaughter. A drought ensues, and when the group reaches water, they also find two dead fellow deserters, killed by Seminoles. The Colonel wishes to bury them, but the foursome disagrees, citing the danger of nearby Seminoles. However, the Kid changes their minds. Soon after, the Colonel begins experiencing troubles, getting a fever, and hallucinating. The group sees smoke, and the Sergeant (the leader of the group) goes to investigate and is attacked by a panther. The rest of the group follows and encounters a seemingly abandoned Seminole settlement. The Colonel, in his deranged state, charges head first into the encampment and is shot by an arrow. The Sergeant rejoins the group and they are attacked by Seminoles. Though they escape, the Colonel dies that evening. After the Colonel's death, the Sergeant declares that it's every man for himself.

The rest of the group soldiers on, heading towards the ocean. Cockney is killed when the group accidentally stumbles upon a nest of rattlesnakes, and he trips and falls into them. Plunkett becomes increasingly strained and paranoid out of fatigue. The remaining trio is forced to cross a river filled with alligators, which they successfully do. Upon getting to the other side, Plunkett offers the Sergeant his gold (as he has provided his safety for the duration of the trip) and finds only rocks in his satchel. Concluding that Cockney stole his gold, he dives back into the river and is eaten by the alligators.

Only the Kid and the Sergeant remain. They venture further and further, but after a heartfelt conversation where the Sergeant regrets running from all his problems, he steps into quicksand. Though the Kid attempts to save him, he is consumed by the sand. The Kid freaks out, running madly through the forest while hearing the voices of his dead comrades. The heartfelt talk about running away returns to him, however, and in the final sequence, the Kid finally reaches the ocean.

== Cast ==
- Lin McCarthy as The Sergeant
- Stephen Courtleigh as The Colonel
- Berry Kroeger as Plunkett
- Harold Gordon as Cockney
- Bill Mason as The Kid
- Al Tamez as Seminole
- Jose Billie as Dead body
- Roy Nash Osceola as Seminole

== Home media ==
On October 27, 2009, Alpha Video released Yellowneck on Region 0 DVD. On November 6, 2012, Mill Creek Entertainment release Yellowneck on DVD as a bonus feature on their Lincoln: Trials by Fire documentary collection.

== See also ==
- List of films in the public domain in the United States
