= Bob Jellison =

American actor (1906–1988)

- Born: Robert Dow Jellison; August 21, 1908; Des Moines, Iowa, U.S.
- Died: April 21, 1980 (aged 71); Santa Monica, California, U.S.
- Education: University of Iowa
- Occupation: Actor
- Years active: 1930–1970
- Spouse(s): Eleanor Dye West (m. 1937; ?); Evelyn M. Houlihan (m. ?; div. 1942); Louise E. Hutton (m. ?; div. 1954) ? (m. ?)

Robert Dow Jellison (August 21, 1908 – April 21, 1980) was an American character actor of radio, stage and screen, most often seen in comic roles, the best known being Bobby the Bellboy in I Love Lucy. He was the uncle of voice actor Bill Ratner.

== Early life and career ==
Born in Des Moines, Iowa, Jellison was born into a musical family, the son of singer/choir director James Otto Jellison and singer and pianist Zella Blanche Dow. Interviewed in 1953, Jellison recalled making his professional debut at age 3 as part of his parents' vaudeville act, working the lyceum and Chautauqua circuits. By no later than 1918, Des Moines audiences had become well acquainted with the then 9-year-old Robert—aka "Bobby" or "Master Robert"—Jellison, actor and "sweet voiced boy soprano." In January 1920, jellison's performance as Tom Tucker, the midshipmite in Gilbert and Sullivan's H.M.S. Pinafore, was singled out for praise by the Des Moines Register.

By the fall of 1923, the family had relocated to Minneapolis, Minnesota, where his father became affiliated with radio station WCCO. Subsequent conversations with staff dramatist Marjorie Ellis McGrady led to Bob's employment at the station, initially as a sound effects man, and later as an actor.

One of Jellison's best known radio roles is Enor in Lone Journey. Other shows on which he appeared include Author's Playhouse and Hot Copy, as well as The Sealtest Village Store. On the television series I Love Lucy, he appeared as a milkman in an episode of the first season and as Bobby the bellboy in six episodes of the fourth season. He also appeared as a bellboy named Henry in an episode of The Lucy–Desi Comedy Hour. Other television credits include Meet Millie and Life with Luigi, while two films reportedly "enlivened [by] his comic antics" are MGM's Too Young to Kiss and the RKO short subject Newlyweds Take a Chance. Another, the 1962 George Roy Hill-Isobel Lennart screen adaptation of Tennessee Williams' Period of Adjustment, features veteran character actors Jellison, Ransom Sherman, Artie Lewis, Norman Leavitt, Lee Krieger, and Herbert Vigran as a sextet of off-key Christmas carolers.

== Personal life and death ==
Jellison married at least four times. From August 1937 until at least October 1940, he was the husband of Eleanor Dye West. His marriages to Evelyn M. Houlihan and Louise E. Hutton each ended via divorce (in 1942 and 1954, respectively).

On April 21, 1980, Jellison died of liver disease at St. John's Hospital in Santa Monica, California. Survived by his wife, his body was cremated.
