= Berry Kroeger =

American film, television and stage actor (1912–1991)

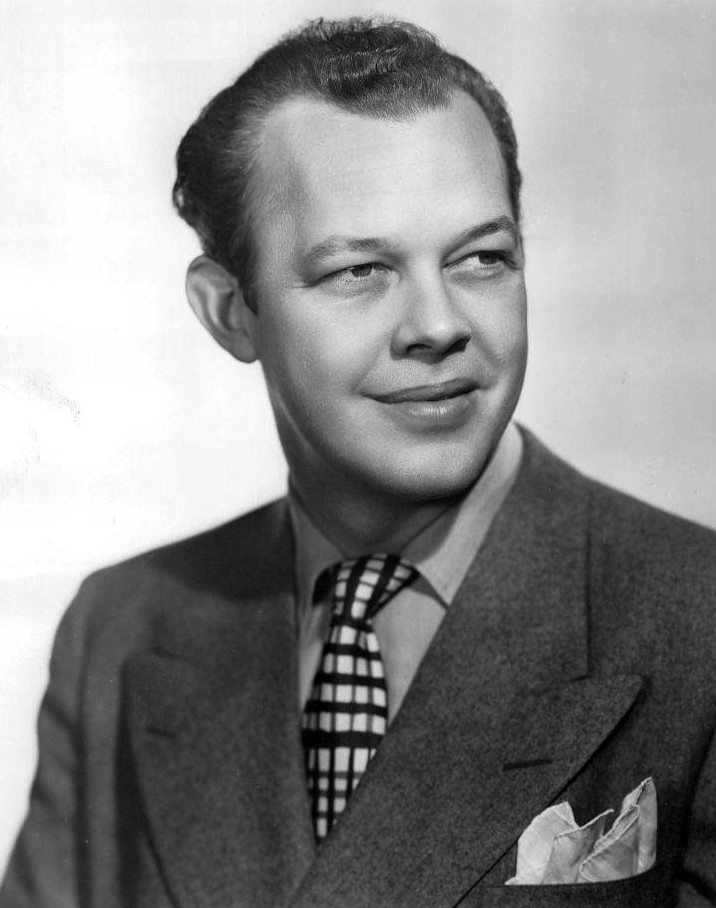
- Kroeger as the narrator for The Big Story, 1947.
- Born: October 16, 1912; San Antonio, Texas, U.S.
- Died: January 4, 1991 (aged 78); Los Angeles, California, U.S.
- Occupation: Actor
- Years active: 1932–1991
- Spouse: Mary Agnes (?-1991) (his death)

Berry Kroeger (October 16, 1912 – January 4, 1991) was an American film, television and stage actor.

== Career ==
Kroeger was born in San Antonio, Texas. He got his acting start on radio as an announcer on Suspense and as an actor, playing for a time The Falcon in the radio series Also on radio, he portrayed Dr. Reed Bannister on Big Sister, narrated Salute to Youth, and was a regular as Sam Williams on Young Doctor Malone.

Kroeger made his Broadway debut on December 6, 1943, at the Royale Theatre as Miley in Nunnally Johnson's The World's Full of Girls, which was adapted from Thomas Bell's 1943 novel Till I Come Back to You. He went on to appear in Reclining Figure (1954), Julius Caesar (1950), and The Tempest (1944). He portrayed the High Lama in the 1956 musical adaptation of Lost Horizon titled Shangri-La.

Kroeger was discovered by filmmaker William Wellman while performing on Broadway and began appearing in films with his role in The Iron Curtain (1948). He specialized in playing slimy bad guys in films like Act of Violence (1948), The Iron Curtain (1948), a crooked lawyer in Cry of the City (1948) and a heavy in Joseph H. Lewis' crime film, Gun Crazy (1949).

His flair for decadent leering and evil scowls often led to his being cast in "schlock fare", like Chamber of Horrors (1966) and The Incredible 2-Headed Transplant (1971). He appeared in a small role as a village elder in Young Frankenstein (1974). He also appeared in dozens of television programs. He guest starred on seven episodes of Perry Mason as well as in episodes of The Rifleman, Hawaiian Eye, Get Smart (as a character spoofing actor Sydney Greenstreet) and The Man from U.N.C.L.E.. His last major film role was in 1977's The Demon Seed (1977).

== Death ==
Kroeger died on January 4, 1991, of kidney failure at Cedars-Sinai Medical Center in Los Angeles.

== Filmography ==
Year	Title	Role	Notes
1941	Tom, Dick and Harry	Boy Lead in Movie	Voice, Uncredited
1948	The Iron Curtain	John Grubb, aka 'Paul'	
1948	Cry of the City	W.A. Niles	
1948	The Dark Past	Mike	
1949	Act of Violence	Johnny	
1949	Down to the Sea in Ships	Manchester	
1949	Black Magic	Alexandre Dumas Sr.	
1949	Fighting Man of the Plains	Cliff Bailey	
1949	Chicago Deadline	Solly Wellman	
1950	Gun Crazy	Packett	
1950	Guilty of Treason	Hungarian State Police Col. Timar	
1951	The Sword of Monte Cristo	Minister Charles La Roche	
1952	Battles of Chief Pontiac	Col. von Weber	
1955	Yellowneck	Plunkett	
1955	Blood Alley	Old Feng	
1956	Man in the Vault	Willis Trent	
1960	Seven Thieves	Hugo Baumer	
1960	The Story of Ruth	Huphim	
1960	The Walking Target	Arnie Hoffman	
1961	The Rifleman	Ansel Bain	Episode: "Closer than a Brother"
1961	Atlantis, the Lost Continent	Surgeon	
1962	Mister Ed	Jack Brady	Episode: "Zsa Zsa"
1962	Womanhunt	Petrie / Osgood	
1962	Hitler	Ernst Röhm	
1964	The Time Travelers	Preston	
1964	Youngblood Hawke	Jock Maas	
1966	Chamber of Horrors	Chun Sing	
1969	Nightmare in Wax	Max Black	
1970	The Wild Scene	Tim O'Shea	
1970	Tora! Tora! Tora!	U.S. Army General	Uncredited
1971	The Mephisto Waltz	Raymont	
1971	The Incredible 2-Headed Transplant	Max	
1971	The Seven Minutes	Paul Van Fleet	
1973	Pets	The Art Connoisseur	
1974	Young Frankenstein	First Village Elder	Uncredited
1975	The Man in the Glass Booth	Joachim Berger	
1977	Demon Seed	Petrosian	
