= The Adventures of the Thin Man =

- Les Tremayne and Claudia Morgan
- Other names: The Thin Man
- Genre: Comedy thriller
- Running time: 30 minutes
- Country of origin: United States
- Language: English
- Syndicates: NBC; CBS; ABC
- TV adaptations: The Thin Man
- Starring: Claudia Morgan; Les Damon; Les Tremayne; David Gothard; Joseph Curtin
- Announcer: Ed Herlihy; Nelson Case; Glenn Riggs; Tom Shirley; Ron Rawson; Jimmy Wallington; Joe Weeks; Ted Pearson; Dwight Weist
- Created by: Dashiell Hammett
- Written by: Ruth Hawkins; Denis Green; Milton Lewis; Louis Vittes; Robert Newsom; Eugene Wang
- Directed by: Himan Brown
- Produced by: Himan Brown
- Original release: July 2, 1941 – September 1, 1950
- Sponsored by: Sanka Coffee

The Adventures of the Thin Man was a radio detective series broadcast on all four major radio networks during the years 1941 to 1950. The radio series was modeled after the film series which was based on the 1934 Dashiell Hammett novel. Claudia Morgan had the female lead role of Nora Charles throughout the program's entire nine-year run, with multiple actors playing the part of Nick Charles.

The first series, sponsored by Woodbury Soap Company, aired on NBC Wednesdays at 8pm from July 2, 1941, to December 23, 1942. Les Damon portrayed detective Nick Charles, and he continued in the role into 1943.

Sponsored by General Foods (Post Toasties, Maxwell House Coffee, Sanka), the next series began on CBS January 8, 1943, airing on Fridays at 8:30pm and some Sunday timeslots and continuing until December 26, 1947. Les Tremayne and David Gothard were heard as Nick Charles in 1944–45, with Tremayne still in the role in 1945–46. Les Damon returned as Nick in 1946–47, with Tremayne back in 1948-49 (sponsored by Pabst Blue Ribbon beer during the summer of '48). The last actor to do the part was Joseph Curtin in 1950.

The program's announcers were Ted Pearson, Jimmy Wallington, Joe Weeks, Dwight Weist, Ed Herlihy, Ron Rawson, and Tom Shirley. Fred Fradkin provided music. Himan Brown was the producer. Writers included Dennis Green, Ruth Hawkins, Robert Newman, Louis Vittes, Eugene Wang, and Milton Lewis.

== See also ==
- The Thin Man

== Listen to ==
- Boxcars711: The Adventures of the Thin Man: "Nora's Wedding Anniversary" (October 10, 1943)
