= The Falcon (radio series) =

American radio detective series (1943–1954)

- Ken Lynch and Les Damon in a broadcast of The Falcon
- Genre: Mystery-detective drama
- Running time: 30 minutes
- Country of origin: United States
- Language: English
- Syndicates: Blue Network; Mutual; NBC
- Starring: Berry Kroeger; James Meighan; Les Tremayne; Les Damon; George Petrie
- Announcer: Ed Herlihy; Jack Costello
- Written by: Gene Wang; Bernard Dougall; Jay Bennett
- Directed by: Carlo De Angelo; Richard Lewis; Stuart Buchanan
- Produced by: Bernard L. Schubert
- Original release: April 10, 1943 – November 27, 1954
- Sponsored by: Gem Razors and Blades; Anahist; Kraft Foods; General Mills

The Falcon radio series premiered on the Blue Network on April 10, 1943, continuing on NBC and Mutual until November 27, 1954.

== Background ==
"Drexel Drake" (a pseudonym of Charles H. Huff) created Michael Waring, alias the Falcon, a free-lance investigator and troubleshooter, in his 1936 novel, The Falcon's Prey. It was followed by two more novels (The Falcon Cuts In, 1937 and The Falcon Meets a Lady, 1938) and a 1938 short story. In 1941, RKO Radio Pictures launched a Falcon movie series, but that was based on a different character (Gay Lawrence) by a different author (Michael Arlen). Only the popularity of the film series prompted the radio series; the film and radio series were otherwise unrelated. The radio series was based on the Drexel Drake character. No explanation for the nickname was ever mentioned in any of the dramatizations.

The Michael Waring Falcon was also the hero in three late 1940s movies starring John Calvert, and a television series starring Charles McGraw.

== Characters and story ==
James Meighan portrayed the Falcon from 1945 to 1947.

Like the Falcon film series, the radio plots mixed danger, romance and comedy in equal parts. Each show began with a telephone ringing and Michael Waring, the Falcon, answering the phone. Speaking with a woman whose voice was never heard, Waring would explain that he had an urgent situation in which he had to deal with criminals. This led into the standard opening, followed by the week's tale of adventure. Often, incompetent police were unable to solve the mysteries without his help.

== Actors ==
The program's characters and the actors who played them are indicated in the table below.

Character	Actor
The Falcon (Michael Waring)	Berry Kroeger (1943); James Meighan (1945–47); Les Tremayne (1947–1950); Les Damon (1950–1953); George Petrie (1953–1954)
Nancy	Joan Banks; Elspeth Eric; Joan Alexander
Sergeant Johnny Gleason	Mandel Kramer
Sergeant Corbett	Ken Lynch

Source (except for years): Radio Programs, 1924-1984: A Catalog of More Than 1800 Shows

Those heard in supporting roles included Robert Dryden, Ethel Everett and Everett Sloane. Russ Dunbar and Ed Herlihy were the announcers. The organist was Bob Hamilton, with Emerson Buckley and Harry Sosnik as orchestra leaders. Bernard L. Schubert was the producer.

== Schedule ==
Adventures of the Falcon was broadcast on Mutual on Sundays at 7 p.m. Eastern Time until May 7, 1950, when it was moved to NBC in the same time slot. NBC made that change because the program had been more successful against Jack Benny's show than any other radio competitors.
