= Strawberries Need Rain =

- Directed by: Larry Buchanan
- Written by: Larry Buchanan
- Produced by: Larry Buchanan
- Starring: Les Tremayne; Monica Gayle
- Distributed by: Futurama International Inc.
- Release date: 1970
- Country: United States
- Language: English

Strawberries Need Rain is a 1970 film directed by Larry Buchanan and starring Les Tremayne and Monica Gayle. The film was inspired by the works of Ingmar Bergman, and Buchanan allegedly persuaded some theatre owners to advertising it as a Bergman film. It was shot in various German towns in the Texas Hill Country. Buchanan described the story as "essentially European in nature".
