= Wendy Barrie =

British actress (1912–1978)

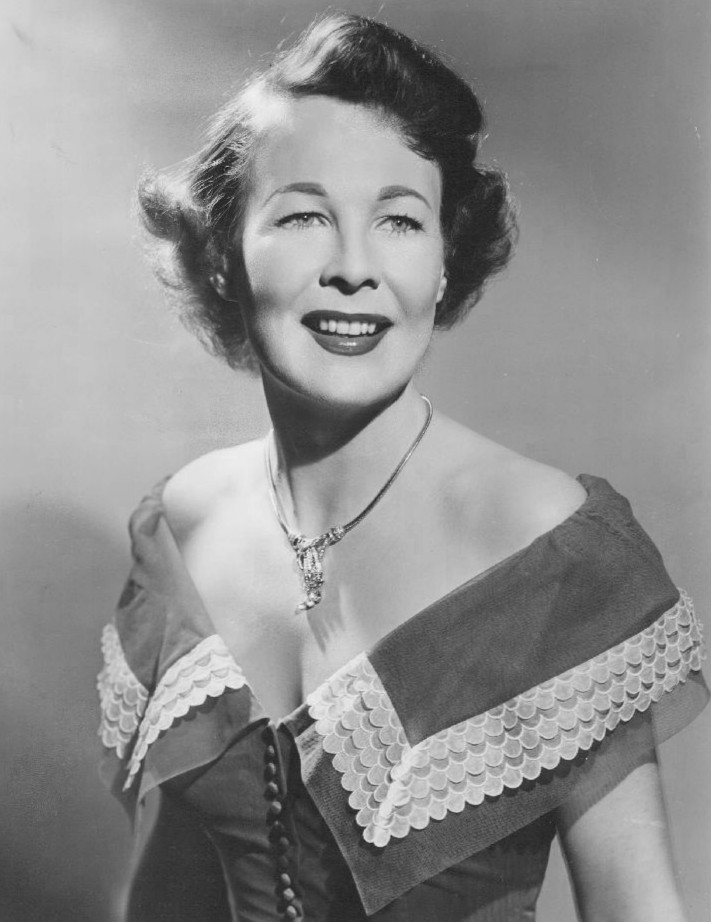
- Barrie in NBC publicity photo from her early television talk program The Wendy Barrie Show (1950)
- Born: Marguerite Wendy Jenkins; 18 April 1912; London or British Hong Kong
- Died: 2 February 1978 (aged 65); Englewood, New Jersey, U.S.
- Resting place: Kensico Cemetery, Valhalla, New York
- Occupation: Actress
- Years active: 1932–1962
- Known for: The Private Life of Henry VIII
- Spouse: David L. Meyer
- Partner: Bugsy Siegel (1942–1943)

Wendy Barrie (born Marguerite Wendy Jenkins; 18 April 1912 – 2 February 1978) was a British actress.

== Early life ==
Although sometimes stated to have been born in London, other sources, including Barrie herself, state that she was born in British Hong Kong, to English parents. Her father, Francis Charles John Graigoe Jenkin KC, was an employee of the Great Western Railway (according to the 1901 census), who then joined the Royal Fusiliers in 1902. Her mother was Ellen McDonagh. Hollywood gave her a more exotic parentage with her father being a King's Counsel. She received her education at a convent school in England and a finishing school in Switzerland.

== Film ==
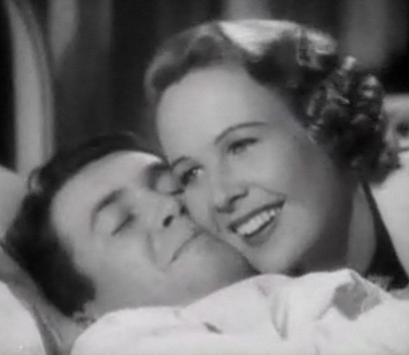
With James Stewart in Speed (1936)

In 1932, Barrie made her screen debut in the film Threads, which was based upon a play. She went on to make a number of motion pictures for London Films under the Korda brothers, Alexander and Zoltan, the best known of which is 1933's The Private Life of Henry VIII, in which she portrayed Jane Seymour.

In 1934, she appeared in Freedom of the Seas and was contracted by Fox Film Corporation for a film directed by Scott Darling that was made in Britain. The following year, she moved to the United States and made her first Hollywood film for Fox opposite Spencer Tracy in the romantic comedy It's a Small World, followed by Under Your Spell with Lawrence Tibbett. Loaned to MGM, Barrie starred opposite James Stewart in the 1936 film Speed. In 1939 she starred with Richard Greene and Basil Rathbone in the 20th Century Fox version of The Hound of the Baskervilles, and with Lucille Ball in RKO's Five Came Back. During 1939 and the early 1940s, Barrie made several of The Saint and The Falcon mystery films with George Sanders. She made her final motion picture in 1954.

== Radio ==
Barrie was a member of the cast of The Jack Haley Show on NBC (1937-1938) and CBS (1938-1939). She was an assistant on the Star for a Night program on the Blue Network (1943-1944), and she was one of the quizmasters on Detect and Collect on CBS (1945) and ABC (1945-1946). In 1956, she had a disc jockey program, the Wendy Barrie Show, on WMGM in New York City. She also hosted a widely syndicated radio interview show into the mid-1960s.

== Television ==
With the dawn of television, in the late 1940s, Barrie turned to roles in that medium. From November 17, 1948, to February 9, 1949, Barrie hosted Picture This on NBC. During 1948 and 1949, she hosted a DuMont Television Network comedy for children featuring a cowboy puppet called The Adventures of Oky Doky.

However, she is best remembered by U.S. audiences as host of one of the first television talk shows. The Wendy Barrie Show debuted in November 1948 on ABC, then ran on DuMont and NBC, ending its run in September 1950. (Another source says the program debuted on DuMont March 14, 1949. Yet another source says that it debuted November 10, 1948, on NBC.) That program was replaced by Through Wendy's Window in August 1950. The 15-minute NBC program had Barrie interviewing celebrities and talking about fashions.

Barrie was hostess of the short-lived Stars in Khaki and Blue, a "prime-time talent show for members of the Armed Forces," which debuted on NBC September 13, 1952, and ended September 27, 1952. She continued to appear on network television on panel shows and as a guest star in the early 1950s, and also as a spokesperson for commercial products, including a stint as the original Revlon saleswoman on The $64,000 Question during its first months on air. Her pitching of Living Lipstick saw that product being sold out across the country. Barrie continued on local TV in New York City.

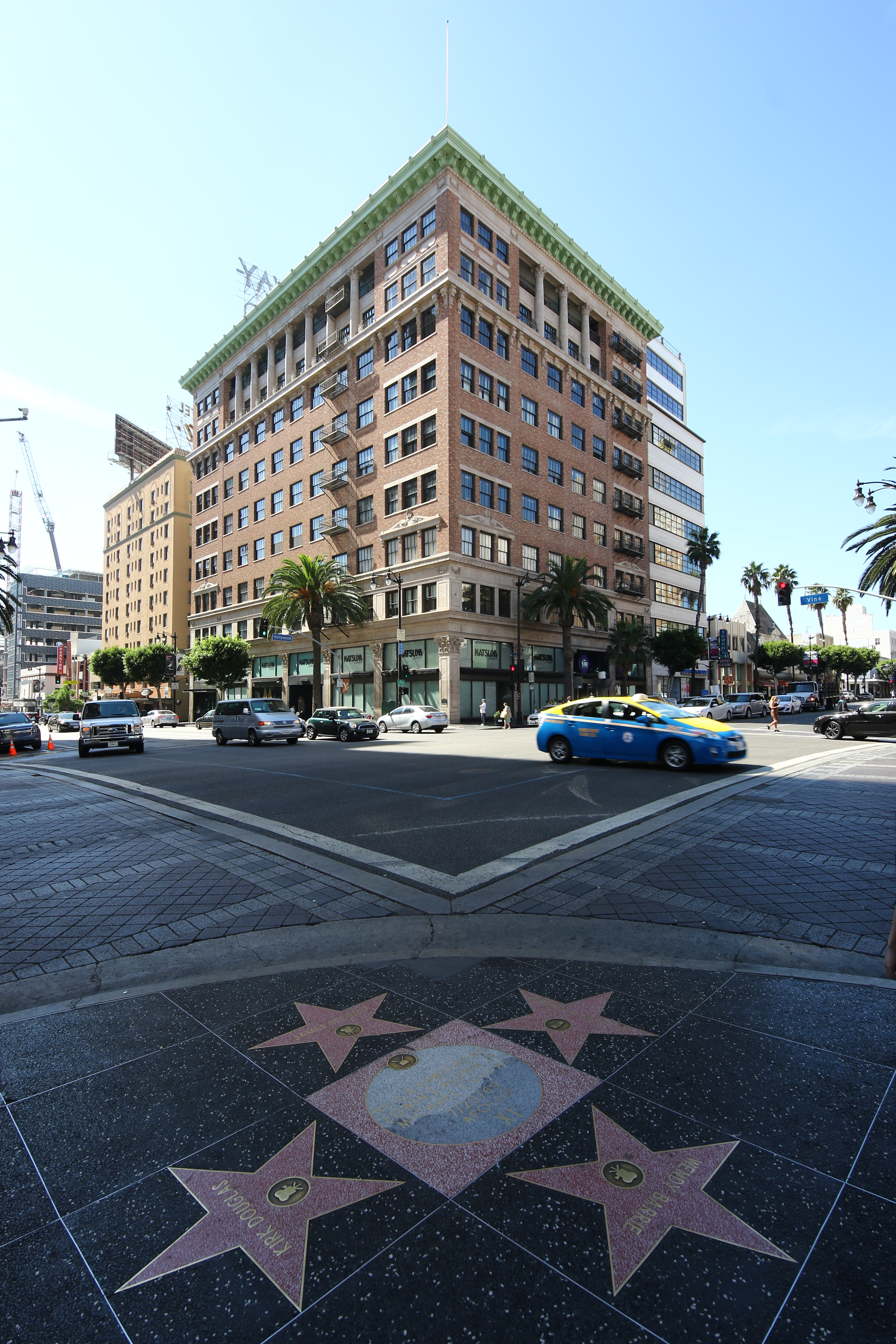
Hollywood Walk of Fame star at Hollywood and Vine (background Broadway Hollywood Building)

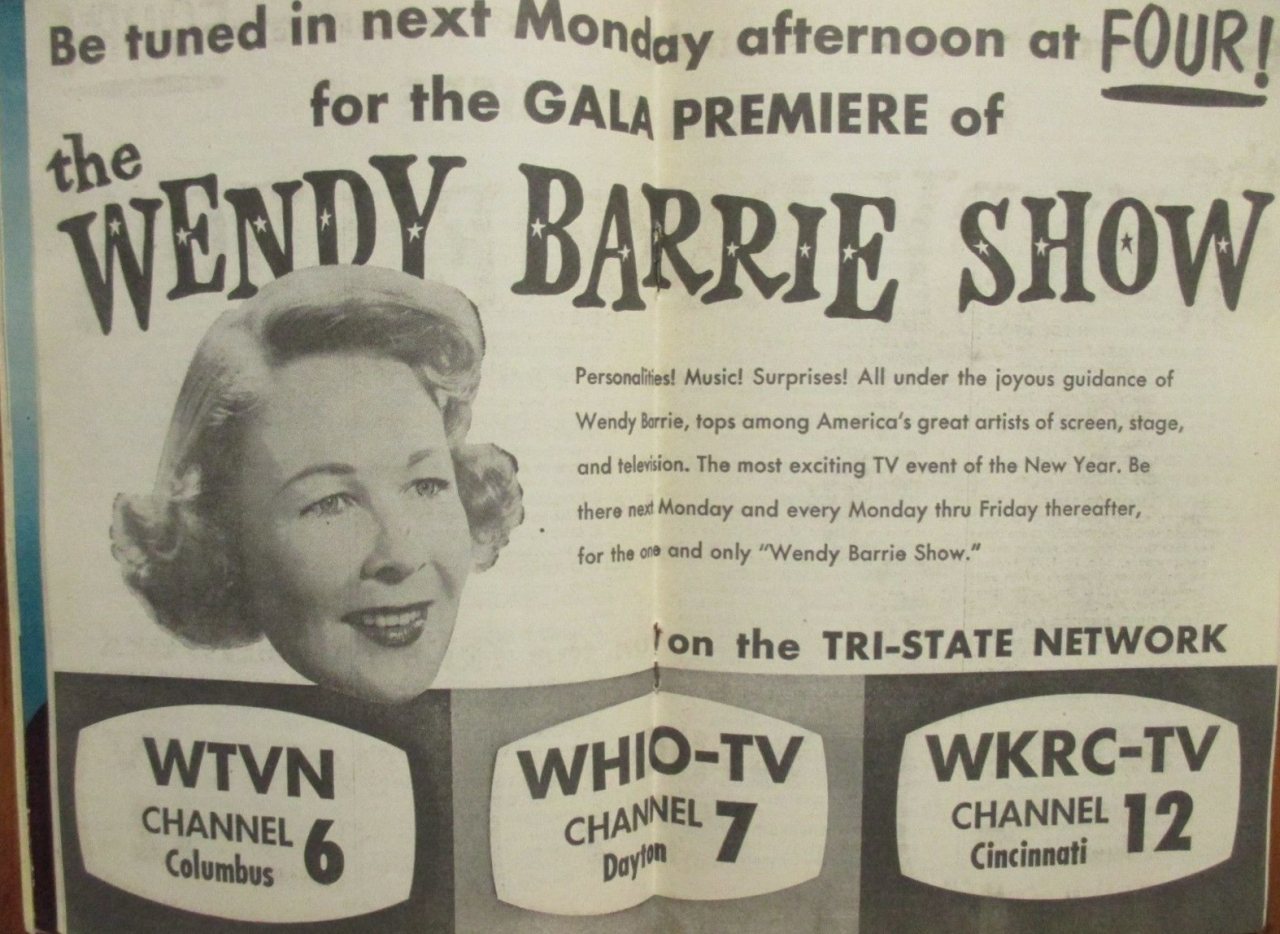
Advertisement for the premiere of The Wendy Barrie Show

In 1953, three television stations owned by Taft Broadcasting Company and Cox Communications formed the short-lived "Tri-State Network" to compete with entertainment programming produced by Crosley Broadcasting Corporation on Crosley television stations in the Cincinnati, Columbus and Dayton, Ohio broadcast markets. On January 11, 1954, a new The Wendy Barrie Show premiered from the studios of WHIO-TV in Dayton, simulcast on Taft Broadcasting's WKRC-TV in Cincinnati and WTVN-TV (now WSYX) in Columbus. Wendy Barrie's contract was terminated in October 1954.

== Recognition ==
After appearances in more than 15 films in Britain and more than 30 in Hollywood, Barrie's contribution to the industry was recognized with a motion pictures star on the Hollywood Walk of Fame at 1708 Vine Street, near the corner of Hollywood and Vine. Her star was dedicated February 8, 1960.

== Personal life and death ==
Barrie became a naturalized American citizen in 1942. She was reportedly engaged to and had a daughter named Carolyn with the infamous gangster Benjamin "Bugsy" Siegel, and at one time was married to textile manufacturer David L. Meyer.

She died in Englewood, New Jersey, in 1978, aged 65, following a stroke that had left her debilitated for several years. She was buried in the Kensico Cemetery in Valhalla, New York.

== Filmography ==
- Wedding Rehearsal (1932) – Lady Mary Rose Wroxbury
- The Barton Mystery (1932) – Phyllis Grey
- Where Is This Lady? (1932) – Lucie Kleiner
- Threads (1932) – Olive Wynn
- The Call Box Mystery (1932) – Iris Banner
- Collision (1932) – Joyce
- Cash (1933) – Lilian Gilbert
- It's a Boy (1933) – Mary Bogle
- The Private Life of Henry VIII (1933) – Jane Seymour
- The House of Trent (1933) – Angela Fairdown
- This Acting Business (1933) – Joyce
- Murder at the Inn (1934) – Angela
- The Man I Want (1934) – Marion Round
- Without You (1934) – Molly Bannister
- Freedom of the Seas (1934) – Phyllis Harcourt
- Give Her a Ring (1934) – Karen Svenson
- There Goes Susie (1934) – Madeleine Sarteaux
- It's a Small World (1935) – Jane Dale
- College Scandal (1935) – Julie Fresnel
- The Big Broadcast of 1936 (1935) – Sue
- A Feather in Her Hat (1935) – Pauline Anders
- Millions in the Air (1935) – Marion Keller
- If I Were Rich (1936) - Lillian Gilbert
- Love on a Bet (1936) – Paula Gilbert
- Speed (1936) – Jane Mitchell
- Ticket to Paradise (1936) – Jane Forbes
- Under Your Spell (1936) – Cynthia Drexel
- Breezing Home (1937) – Gloria Lee
- Wings over Honolulu (1937) – Lauralee Curtis
- What Price Vengeance (1937) – Polly Moore
- Dead End (1937) – Kay
- A Girl with Ideas (1937) – Mary Morton
- Prescription for Romance (1937) – Valerie Wilson
- I Am the Law (1938) – Frances 'Frankie' Ballou
- Newsboys' Home (1938) – Gwen Dutton
- Pacific Liner (1939) – Ann Grayson
- The Saint Strikes Back (1939) – Val Travers
- The Hound of the Baskervilles (1939) – Beryl Stapleton
- Five Came Back (1939) – Alice Melhorne
- The Witness Vanishes (1939) – Joan Marplay
- Day-Time Wife (1939) – Kitty
- The Saint Takes Over (1940) – Ruth Summers
- Women in War (1940) – Pamela Starr
- Cross-Country Romance (1940) – Diane North, aka Maggie "Jonesy" Jones
- Men Against the Sky (1940) – Kay Mercedes, aka Kay Green
- Who Killed Aunt Maggie? (1940) – Sally Ambler
- The Saint in Palm Springs (1941) – Elna Johnson
- Repent at Leisure (1941) – Emily Baldwin
- The Gay Falcon (1941) – Helen Reed
- Public Enemies (1941) – Bonnie Parker
- A Date with the Falcon (1942) – Helen Reed
- Eyes of the Underworld (1942) – Betty Standing
- Forever and a Day (1943) – Edith Trimble-Pomfret
- Submarine Alert (1943) – Ann Patterson
- Follies Girl (1943) – Anne Merriday
- It Should Happen to You (1954) – Guest Panelist #3
