= Irving Reis =

American film director (1906–1953)

- Born: May 7, 1906; New York City
- Died: July 3, 1953 (aged 47); Woodland Hills, California
- Occupations: radio program producer & director film director
- Spouse(s): Meta Arenson; Vanessa Idu
- Children: 3

Irving Reis (May 7, 1906 in New York City – July 3, 1953 in Woodland Hills, California) was a radio program producer and director, and a film director.

== Biography ==
Irving Reis was born into a Jewish family.

Reis began his career as a motion picture photographer. The most notable of his screen efforts was being one of the photographers for The Hollywood Revue of 1929.

A 1931 notice in Variety declared that he was transitioning into a playwright. By 1933, Variety took notice of his radio play St. Louis Blues. His radio play Meridian 7-1212 first broadcast on January 24, 1935, received an "above par" comment from Variety. Observing that he wrote and produced the play, the unnamed reviewer noted the numerous radio effects, and that compared to his two previous radio plays, this was the best.

Reis was the creator of Columbia Workshop, the experimental anthology program on the radio, and its initial broadcast took place on July 18, 1936.

Reis departed for Hollywood on January 1, 1938, where he became a scriptwriter for Paramount Pictures. In November 1939, Variety announced that Reis would be taking 10 weeks off from his script writing at Paramount to study film direction.

In February 1940, Variety announced that Reis had left Paramount to begin directing at RKO Pictures. Among his motion picture credits are Enchantment, Roseanna McCoy, The Big Street, and the screen adaptation of Arthur Miller's play All My Sons (1948). Reis also directed the movie The Four Poster, based on Jan de Hartog's play The Fourposter.

== Personal ==
Reis married writer Meta Arenson in Tijuana on August 10, 1938.

He died of cancer, leaving his wife and three children. Reis is buried in the Jewish Cemetery Hillside Memorial Park.

== Selected filmography ==
- Too Much Business (1922)
- The Ladder Jinx (1922)
- Breaking Into Society (1923)
- The Business of Love (1925)
- Trout Fishing (1932, short)
- One Crowded Night (1940)
- I'm Still Alive (1940)
- Footlight Fever (1941)
- The Gay Falcon (1941)
- Weekend for Three (1941)
- A Date with the Falcon (1942)
- The Falcon Takes Over (1942)
- The Big Street (1942)
- Crack-Up (1946)
- The Bachelor and the Bobby-Soxer (1947)
- All My Sons (1948)
- Enchantment (1948)
- Roseanna McCoy (1949)
- Dancing in the Dark (1949)
- Of Men and Music (1951, documentary)
- Three Husbands (1951)
- New Mexico (1951)
- The Four Poster (1952)

== See also ==
- Columbia Workshop
