= The Horn and Hardart Children's Hour =

The Horn and Hardart Children's Hour, as seen from WCAU-TV's control room in 1948.

The Horn and Hardart Children's Hour (later known as The Children's Hour) is a variety show with a cast of children, including some who later became well-known adult performers. It had a long run for more than three decades. The program was sponsored by Horn & Hardart, which owned restaurants, bakeshops and automats in New York City and Philadelphia.

== Radio ==
Launched on Halloween day, October 31, 1927, the program was initially broadcast on WCAU Radio in Philadelphia, hosted by Stan Lee Broza, and was later aired on NBC Radio in New York City during the 1940s and 1950s. The original New York host was Paul Douglas, followed by Ralph Edwards and finally Ed Herlihy.

Horn and Hardart's slogan was "Less work for mother dear whose gentle hands, lead us so kindly through little folk lands. We'll give her happiness, each kindness, each caress repaid with thoughtfulness. Less work for mother dear." There were several versions of this song heard on the program:

Less work for mother; let's lend her a hand.
Less work for mother so she'll understand.
She's your greatest treasure;
Let's make her life a pleasure.
Less work for mother dear.

== Television ==
When the program went to television, it was a radio-TV simulcast. The television premiere was on WCAU-TV in Philadelphia in 1948, followed by WNBT in New York in 1949, telecast on Sunday mornings. The hosts were Broza in Philadelphia and Herlihy in New York. A number of performers became quite successful after their work on the Philadelphia TV series, including Ted Arnold (musical director for Glenn Yarbrough and José Feliciano), Frankie Avalon, Rosemary Clooney, Miss Justine Keyes, Buddy DeFranco, Eddie Fisher, Connie Francis, Joey Heatherton, Kitty Kallen, Rose Marie, Bernadette Peters, Ann Sheridan, Arnold Stang, Ezra Stone (radio's original Henry Aldrich) and Bea Wain. Al Alberts (of The Four Aces) had a 30-year children's variety show modeled on the Horn & Hardart show where he had appeared as a child.

Fred Rogers worked as a stage manager on the show, which he later described as "terrible" for forcing children to perform.

The closing song was sung to the tune of "A Bicycle built for Two":

Childhood, childhood
Sweetest days of all
Children playing hide and seek and ball
Tripping to school so merry
The Golden Rule to study
Oh, how we'll miss, the years of bliss
When our childhood days are gone.

The series came to an end in the winter of 1959. Stan Broza died on December 15, 1970.

== Listen to ==
- Clip of Stan Lee Broza hosting a 1933 episode
