= Threads (1932 film) =

1932 film

- Directed by: G.B. Samuelson
- Written by: Frank Stayton (play)
- Produced by: E. Gordon Craig
- Starring: Lawrence Anderson; Dorothy Fane; Wendy Barrie
- Cinematography: Desmond Dickinson
- Production company: G.B. Samuelson Productions
- Distributed by: United Artists
- Release date: 14 March 1932
- Running time: 76 minutes
- Country: United Kingdom
- Language: English

Threads is a 1932 British drama film directed by G.B. Samuelson and starring Lawrence Anderson, Dorothy Fane and Wendy Barrie. It was shot at Cricklewood Studios near London and was released by United Artists.

== Cast ==
- Lawrence Anderson as John Osborne Wynn
- Dorothy Fane as Amelia Wynn
- Gerald Rawlinson as Arthur
- Leslie Cole as James
- Wendy Barrie as Olive Wynn
- Ben Webster as Lord Grathers
- Irene Rooke as Lady Grathers
- Aileen Despard as Chloe
- Pat Reid as Parsons
- Clifford Cobbe as Jefferson Jordan
- Walter Piers as Colonel Packinder

== Bibliography ==
- Low, Rachael. Filmmaking in 1930s Britain. George Allen & Unwin, 1985.
- Wood, Linda. British Films, 1927-1939. British Film Institute, 1986.
