= Claudia Morgan =

American actress (1911–1974)

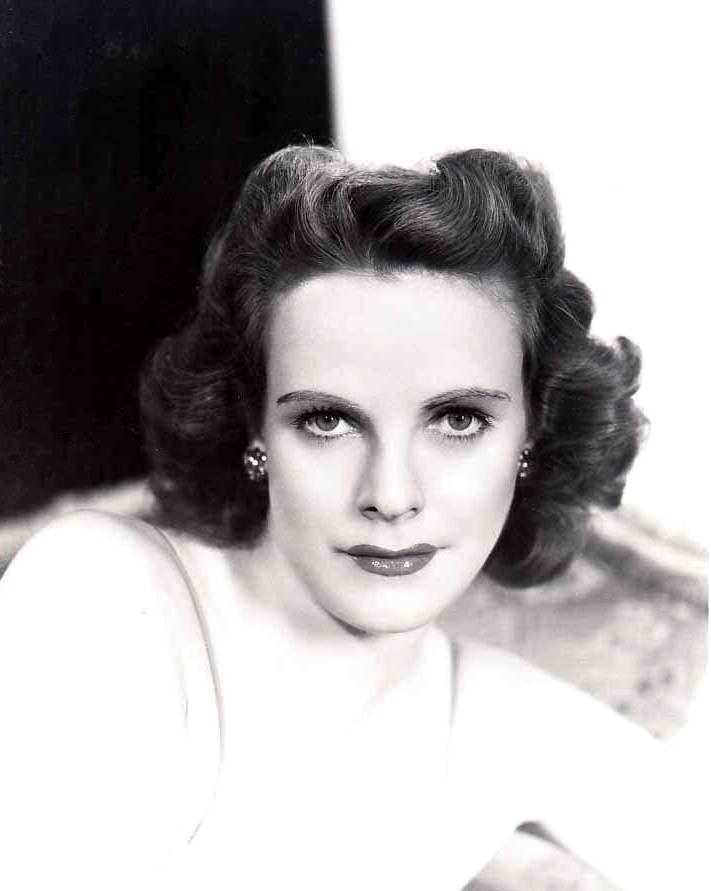
- Born: Claudia Louise Morgan; June 12, 1911; Brooklyn, New York City, U.S.
- Died: September 17, 1974 (aged 63); Manhattan, New York City, U.S.
- Resting place: Greenwood Cemetery, Brooklyn
- Occupation: Actress
- Years active: 1932–1964
- Known for: The Adventures of the Thin Man; Ten Little Indians
- Spouses: Talbott Cummings (m. 1931; annul. 1932): Robert Shippee (m. 1934; div. 19??); Charles Hornburg Jr (m. 1937; div. 1938): Phil Ormsby (m. 1938; div. 19??); W. Kenneth Loane (m. 19??)
- Parent(s): Ralph Morgan and Grace Arnold
- Relatives: Frank Morgan (uncle)

Claudia Louise Morgan (June 12, 1911 – September 17, 1974) was an American film, television, and radio actress. She was best known for debuting the role of Vera Claythorne in the first Broadway production of Agatha Christie's Ten Little Indians and for her portrayal of Nora Charles on the 1940s radio series, The Adventures of the Thin Man.

== Early years ==
Morgan was born in Brooklyn, New York, in 1911 to actors Ralph Morgan (né Raphael Kuhner Wuppermann) and Grace Arnold (née Georgiana Louise Iverson). Some sources indicate she was born Claudia (or Claudeigh) Louise Wuppermann, but other sources indicate her father had already changed his surname to Morgan by the time of her birth. Actor Frank Morgan was her uncle. She attended Ely Court School in Greenwich, Connecticut.

== Stage ==
A member of the cast of more than 30 Broadway plays, Morgan starred in The Man Who Came to Dinner and Ten Little Indians. She eventually was dismissed from her role in Ten Little Indians because her work in The Adventures of the Thin Man on radio caused a delay in the stage production every Friday night. She also appeared in The Apple Cart, and The Sun Field.

== Film/television ==
Morgan's first film role was in 1932, and her last was in 1964 (The World of Henry Orient). She appeared on Kraft Television Theatre and Robert Montgomery Presents.

== Radio ==
Morgan was known for playing Nora Charles in The Adventures of the Thin Man. She was married to radio announcer and actor Ernest Chappell, and performed with him on the late 1940s radio program, Quiet Please. In 1941, she joined the cast of The O'Neills, in the role of Laura Penway. She was also a regular on Ford Theatre, David Harum, Joyce Jordan, M.D., Lone Journey, We Love and Learn, and The Right to Happiness.

== Personal life ==
Morgan was married five times; all of the unions were childless. In 1931, she married Talbott Cummings. They had been married only about a year when she sought a divorce. She wed aviator Robert Shippee on July 22, 1934; that marriage also ended in divorce. She married Charles H. Horburg Jr. on May 14, 1937; the couple divorced in 1938. She married Phil Ormsby, an actor and architect, on August 2, 1938. She was survived by her fifth husband, Kenneth Loane.

== Death ==
Morgan died in New York City on September 17, 1974, aged 63, from undisclosed causes. She was buried in Green-Wood Cemetery, Brooklyn, New York (Section 168, Lot 14447 Wupperman Family Plot).

== Radio appearances ==
Year	Program	Episode/source
1952	Grand Central Station	Everything I Longed For
1953	Grand Central Station	Count Your Chickens
1953	Grand Central Station	The Sly Professor
1955	The Adventures of the Abbotts	Updated Abbott Mysteries series
