= 21st Precinct =

Police radio drama (1953 to 1956)

- Everett Sloane
- Genre: Police drama
- Running time: 30 minutes
- Country of origin: United States
- Language: English
- Syndicates: CBS
- Starring: Everett Sloane
- Announcer: Art Hannes; Bob Hill
- Original release: 1953 – 1956

21st Precinct (a.k.a. Twenty-First Precinct and Twenty First Precinct) was a police drama broadcast on CBS radio from July 7, 1953, to July 26, 1956. It was initially a summer replacement for My Friend Irma.

The program was produced in cooperation with the Patrolmen's Benevolent Association of the City of New York and presented "adaptations from true criminal records in New York...from the policeman's point of view." Historically, the 21st Precinct had been located near Gramercy Park in Manhattan but in 1929 the department reorganized the precinct numbering, and the 21st designation was dropped from use. No such precinct existed during the show's run, nor does a 21st exist today. However, the fictional precinct's territory corresponds closely to that of the Upper East Side's 23rd Precinct as it has existed since 1929.

Stanley Niss was the producer writer-director. The role of precinct Captain Frank Kennelly was played by Everett Sloane (for the first 109 episodes and briefly in episode 135). During episode 109, Captain Frank Kennelly was promoted to Deputy Inspector and reassigned out of the 21st Precinct. He was replaced by Captain Cronin (played by James Gregory, 1955–56) and then Captain Keough (Les Damon, 1956).

Other cast regulars were Ken Lynch (as Lt. Matt King), Harold Stone (as Sgt. Waters), Jack Orrison (as Sgt. Collins), and Santos Ortega (as Lt. Gorman).

The program's announcer began the program's opening each week:

21st Precinct. It's just lines on a map of the city of New York. Most of the 173,000 people wedged into the nine-tenths of a square mile between Fifth Avenue and the East River wouldn't know, if you asked them, that they lived or worked in the 21st. Whether they know it or not, the security of their persons, their homes, and their property is the job of the men of the 21st.

At that point the lead actor would complete the introduction:

The 21st Precinct. 160 patrolmen, 11 sergeants and four lieutenants of whom I'm the boss. My name is Kennelly. Frank Kennelly. I'm Captain in command of the 21st.

Art Hannes, Bob Hill, and Hugh Holder were the program's announcers.

== Production ==
The series was produced by John Ives; it was usually directed and written by Stanley Niss. (Another source lists Niss as producer.) Norman Frank was the program supervisor.

== Critical response ==
A review in the trade publication Variety called 21st Precinct "an exciting show" and noted that the program essentially imitated Dragnet, "down to the last, authentic, understated detailing of police procedure and the curtain-line explanation: 'Names have been changed to protect the innocent.'" It added, however, that 21st Precinct offered more insights than Dragnet into a police captain's routine, making the character "seem all the more human".

== Listen to ==
- Internet Archive: 21st Preciinct
