= Ed Herlihy =

American newsreel narrator, radio and television announcer (1909–1999)

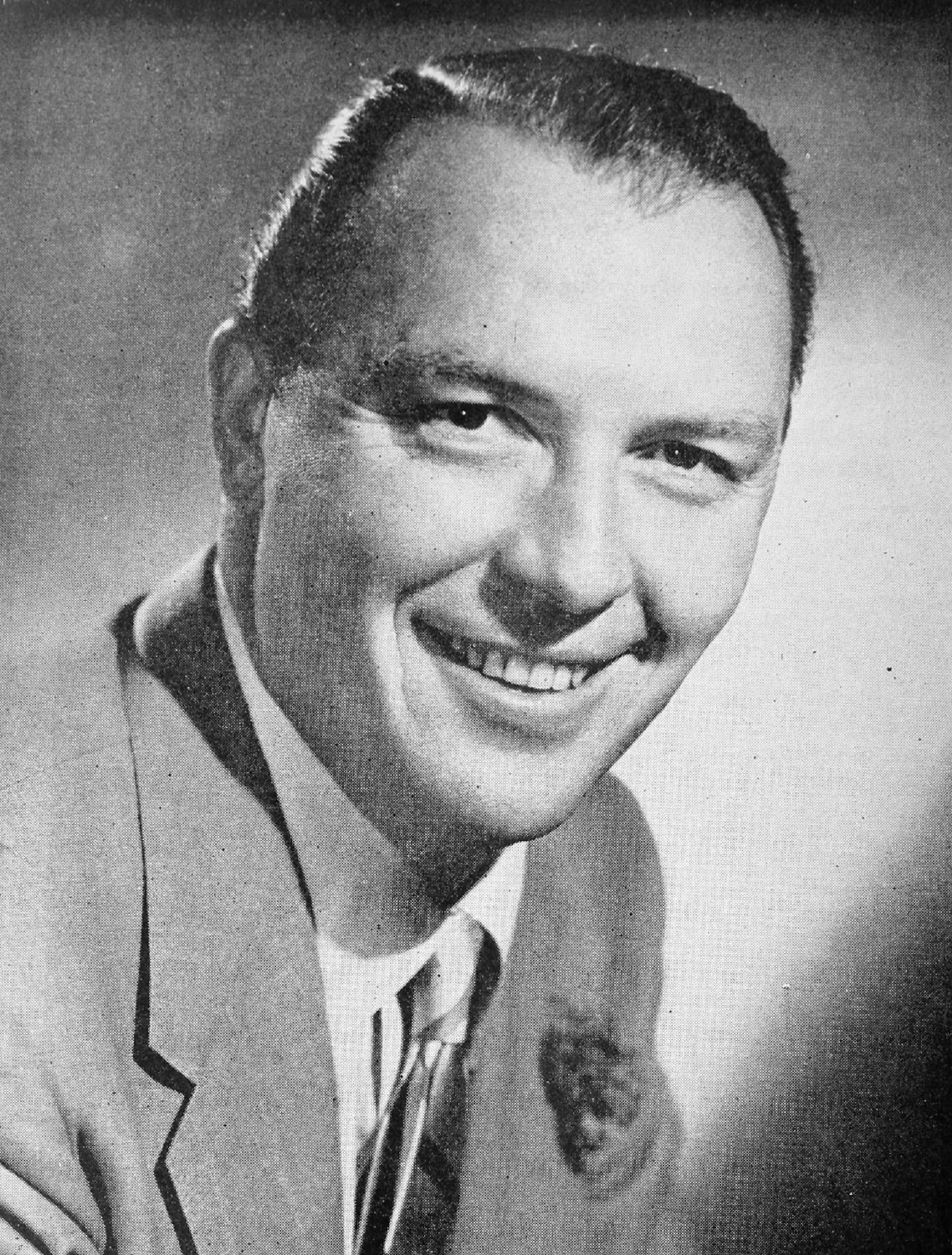
- Herlihy in 1959
- Born: Edward Joseph Herlihy; August 14, 1909; Boston, Massachusetts, U.S.
- Died: January 30, 1999 (aged 89); New York City, U.S.
- Spouse: Fredi Herlihy
- Children: 4
- Career
- Show: Radio: America's Town Meeting of the Air; The Big Show; The Falcon; Mr. District Attorney; Recollections At 30; The Horn and Hardart Children's Hour; Television: The Horn and Hardart Children's Hour; Kraft Television Theatre; Your Show of Shows; All My Children; As the World Turns
- Station: WLOE, Boston
- Network: NBC

Edward Joseph Herlihy (August 14, 1909 – January 30, 1999) was an American newsreel narrator for Universal-International. He was also a long-time radio and television announcer for NBC, hosting The Horn and Hardart Children's Hour in the 1940s and 1950, and was briefly interim announcer on The Tonight Show in 1962. He was also the voice of Kraft Foods radio and television commercials from the 1940s through the early 1980s. When he died in 1999, his obituary in The New York Times said he was "A Voice of Cheer and Cheese".

Herlihy's voice in Universal Newsreels inspired national pride or national mourning, depending whether the topic was terrestrial war on Earth or the first step of a trip to the Moon (1946)

== Career ==
=== Radio and television ===
Educated at Boston College, graduating in 1932, he gained his first radio job in his home town, at Boston's WLOE. When he was hired by NBC in 1935, he decamped for New York, along with his friend, fellow Boston announcer Frank Gallop, who was hired by CBS. In their early days as network announcers, Herlihy and Gallop shared an apartment on West 45th Street. Herlihy was immediately successful in network radio, at that time in its sharpest ascendancy. He was the announcer for many radio shows from the 1930s, to the 1950s, among them: America's Town Meeting, The Big Show, The Falcon, Mr. District Attorney, and Just Plain Bill. He became the host of The Horn and Hardart Children's Hour on radio in 1948, remaining its announcer when the show went to television. He continued his success in the new medium: his early television credits included Sid Caesar's hit Your Show of Shows and soap operas As the World Turns and All My Children. He was also the host of Recollections At 30, which was a special NBC Radio series created for the network's 30th birthday.

==== Kraft Foods ====
In 1947 Herlihy began his long association with Kraft Foods on radio, and continued it when the company sponsored the Kraft Television Theater on television in the 1950s. Richard Severo writes in his obituary of Herlihy that the show—and Herlihy's talent—suited Kraft well:

A dramatic offering, all of it done live, the show featured everything from Shakespeare to Rod Serling; it was at the center of what critics would come to call television's Golden Age. During commercials for Kraft products ("Good food and good food ideas," Mr. Herlihy would say), audiences heard only his voice, a voice he said he tried to make sound friendly. It was an avuncular, next-door-neighbor, deep, mellow kind of voice, a digestive guide through the preparation of all manner of souffles, dips, marshmallow salads and fondues. He was noted for his ability to ad lib through commercials when dramatic presentations ran too long or too short.

Herlihy's role as Kraft spokesman lasted nearly 40 years, his voice becoming as familiar as a next-door neighbor's. From his obituary in The New York Times: "He liked to recall a summer day in Times Square when he helped a blind man to cross at 44th Street. He took the man's arm, and the man said it was a beautiful day. "Yes," Herlihy replied, "this is the kind of day the Lord made for the good guys." The blind man replied: "I know you. You're the cheese man on TV."" In his capacity with Kraft, Severo writes, Herlihy "introduced Cheez Whiz, offered innumerable entreaties to buy Velveeta and delivered eloquent apologias for the entombment of almost anything edible with Miracle Whip".

=== Newsreel narration ===
Herlihy reports on the Vietnam War on the February 8, 1965 edition of Universal Newsreel

For Universal Newsreels in the 1940s, Herlihy narrated editions describing the Japanese attack on Pearl Harbor, the Allies' early setbacks against the Axis powers, the turning of the tide of World War II, the death of President Roosevelt, the execution of Italian dictator Benito Mussolini and the detonation of the first atomic bombs. In the next decade, during the Cold War, he narrated the first American newsreel on the launch of Sputnik.

=== Film and stage ===
When he worked for Sid Caesar in the 1950s, Herlihy met Woody Allen, then a fledgling writer. Allen was so impressed with Herlihy's voice that he used him in several of his films in the 1980s, including Hannah and Her Sisters, Radio Days, and Zelig; his other film credits included The King of Comedy as the announcer for The Jerry Langford Show and Pee-wee's Big Adventure as Francis's father, Mr. Buxton.

He also appeared in road company stage productions outside New York City, including Camelot, Good News and Damn Yankees. He was in Watergate: The Musical, in Atlanta in 1982; Herlihy played Senator Sam Ervin, a role for which he spent $40 for a pair of bushy eyebrows, only to find that they would not move up and down.

== Later life ==
Herlihy made his last TV appearance on a PBS tribute N.Y. TV: By the People Who Made It in 1999.

== Death ==
Herlihy died of natural causes at his home in Manhattan, New York City, aged 89.

The Herlihy family is one of the supporters of the Lillian Booth Actors Home in Englewood, New Jersey; the foyer, with its oil portrait of Herlihy, is named in his memory.

== Filmography ==
| Year | Title | Role | Notes |
|---|---|---|---|
| 1973 | Ten from Your Show of Shows | The Narrator | |
| 1981 | The Chosen | Newsreel Announcer | |
| 1983 | The King of Comedy | Himself | (announcer for The Jerry Langford Show) |
| 1983 | Zelig | Newsreel Announcer | Voice |
| 1985 | Police Academy 2: Their First Assignment | Officer Dooley | |
| 1985 | Pee-wee's Big Adventure | Mr. Buxton | |
| 1986 | A Fine Mess | TV Reporter | |
| 1988 | The Speeches of Winston Churchill | | Voice (archive footage) |
| 1988 | Who Framed Roger Rabbit | Newscaster | |
| 1992 | Malcolm X | Joe Louis Announcer | |
| 1994 | Don't Drink the Water | Narrator | TV movie (final film role) |
