= A Date with the Falcon =

1942 film by Irving Reis

- Theatrical release poster
- Directed by: Irving Reis
- Written by: Frank Fenton; Lynn Root
- Produced by: Howard Benedict
- Starring: George Sanders; Wendy Barrie; James Gleason; Allen Jenkins; Mona Maris
- Cinematography: Robert De Grasse
- Edited by: Harry Marker
- Music by: Paul Sawtell
- Production company: RKO Radio Pictures Inc.
- Distributed by: RKO Radio Pictures
- Release dates: January 16, 1942 (U.S.); November 24, 1941 (New York City)
- Running time: 63 minutes
- Country: United States
- Language: English

A Date with the Falcon (a.k.a. The Gay Falcon Steps In and A Date With Murder) is the second in a series of 16 films about the suave detective nicknamed The Falcon. The 1942 sequel features many of the same characters as the first film, The Gay Falcon (1941). (Note: Although Michael Arlen's character is named Gay Falcon, the name appears first as Gay Laurence in The Gay Falcon, then as "Gay Lawrence" in subsequent screen credits.)

== Plot ==
Scientist Waldo Sampson has discovered how to manufacture cheap synthetic diamonds that are nearly identical to the real thing. When Sampson disappears, Police Inspector Mike O'Hara turns to Gay Lawrence (aka the Falcon) for help. Lawrence is about to fly off with his long-suffering fiancée Helen Reed and turns down O'Hara.

Jewel thief Rita Mara is part of the gang who abducted Sampson for his formula. She tries to recruit the Falcon and when he declines, he is taken at gunpoint. He escapes, tracks Waldo to a hotel and breaks into his room where he finds Waldo's twin brother Herman dead. The police arrive and assume that it is Waldo. To find Waldo, the Falcon allows himself to be abducted again, this time with his sidekick, Jonathan "Goldy" Locke, following. He is taken to a warehouse where Rita's accomplice Max is holding Waldo.

Max and his henchman Dutch go to meet Meyer, a buyer for the formula, leaving Rita and henchman Needles with Waldo and the Falcon. Having been alerted by Goldy, the police arrive and the Falcon slips away with Rita. She now believes Max plans to double-cross her and that the Falcon has thrown in with her.

Rita and the Falcon interrupt the meeting between Max and Meyer. Rita shoots Max, Dutch escapes, the Falcon phones the police but Meyer knocks out the Falcon. Rita and Meyer discover that Max doesn't have the formula so they go after Dutch. O'Hara arrives and arrests the Falcon for the murder of Max. At headquarters, Detective Bates brings in Rita, Dutch, Needles and Meyer, and the Falcon is exonerated. O'Hara is about to remove his handcuffs but Helen wants them left on. She leads him away and they finally catch their plane.

== Cast ==
- George Sanders as Gay Lawrence/The Falcon
- Wendy Barrie as Helen Reed
- Allen Jenkins as Jonathan "Goldy" Locke
- James Gleason as Detective Inspector Mike O’Hara
- Mona Maris as Rita Mara
- Edward Gargan as Detective Bates (uncredited)
- Alec Craig as Waldo Sampson / Herman Sampson (uncredited)
- Hans Conreid as Hotel Clerk (uncredited)
- Victor Kilian as Max Carlson (uncredited)
- Frank Moran as Dutch (uncredited)
- Earle Ross as Adolph Meyer (uncredited)
- Paul Newlan as Policeman (uncredited)
- Russ Clark as Needles (uncredited)
- Eddie Dunn as Grimes (uncredited)
- Frank Martinelli as Louie (uncredited)
- Jack Carr as Taxi Driver (uncredited)
- Eddie Borden as Taxi Driver (uncredited)
- Roxanne Barkley as Jill (uncredited)
- Eddie Arden as Bellhop (uncredited)

== Production ==
The film was originally titled The Gay Falcon Steps In. Filming started on August 1, 1941. In A Date with the Falcon, Guy Lawrence aka the Falcon (George Sanders) is engaged to Helen Reed but leading lady Wendy Barrie would never appear in future sequels. RKO had been trading on the British Barrie's notoriety as the girlfriend of gangster Bugsy Siegel but did not have a continuing role for her in mind. A Date with the Falcon would be the first of many sequels that featured other actresses in leading roles. The series also became a breeding ground for other talented studio contractees including director Edward Dmytryk and actors Barbara Hale and Jane Greer. The Falcon series has been characterised as part of a new genre—film noir.

== Reception ==
In his review of A Date with the Falcon, Bosley Crowther wrote in The New York Times that a pattern existed in the Falcon series:"... the pattern. Mr. Sanders, an idle man of the world, is just about to be married—this time to Wendy Barrie—when a mystifying crisis arises—this time the disappearance of a scientist. Obviously Mr. Sanders doesn't care to enter the case; he never does—or never did, perhaps we should say. But duty and the lure of adventure inevitably drag him in. And so, for fifty or sixty minutes, he is off on a serio-comic chase, sleuthing a gang of murderous smugglers, while his girl and the police act bored and dense."
