= It's a Crime, Mr. Collins =

It's a Crime, Mr. Collins is a half-hour mystery/adventure radio program that was broadcast weekly from August 1956 to February 1957 by the Mutual Broadcasting System in the United States that was a "flagrant rip-off of The Adventures of the Abbotts in which only the names had been changed."

San Francisco private detective Greg Collins was played by Mandel Kramer (who had previously been heard as Lieutenant Tragg in the radio version of Perry Mason) and his wife, Gail Collins, was played by namesake Gail Collins. Each week, Gail Collins, "the gumshoe's gorgeous spouse—with green-eyed predilections emerging as curvaceous damsels in distress frequently petitioned her husband—shared his investigative exploits with her Uncle Jack and thereby with the listeners at home." Uncle Jack was played by Richard Denning, whom listeners had heard from 1952 to 1954 as amateur detective Jerry North in the radio version of Mr. and Mrs. North. Kramer had also played on Mr. and Mrs. North in the comedic supporting role of Brooklyn taxi driver Mahatma McGloin.

Frances Crane's detective pair, Pat and Jean Abbott "came to radio on Abbott Mysteries on Mutual in 1945 and then ran for three consecutive summers. The series was resurrected by NBC in 1955 under the new title of The Adventures of the Abbotts and this nudged Mutual into producing a copycat show, It's a Crime, Mr. Collins. "Many programs in the Golden Age of Radio were flattered by their competitors... The Abbotts on NBC were copied exactly in Mutual's It's a Crime, Mr. Collins, including paraphrasing (the original author's) words." "Mutual even used... the habit of putting a color in the title of every story."
