= Les Tremayne =

British actor (1913–2003)

- Tremayne in Shazam!, 1974
- Born: Lester Tremayne; 16 April 1913; Balham, London, England
- Died: 19 December 2003 (aged 90); Santa Monica, California, U.S.
- Occupation: Actor
- Years active: 1931–1993
- Spouses: Eileen Palmer (m. 1940; div. 1944) Alice Reinheart (m. 1945; div. 1962) Ruth Ann Mills (m. 1963; div. 1967) Joan Lenore Hertz (m. 1980)

Lester Tremayne (16 April 1913 – 19 December 2003) was a British-born actor who performed in Vaudeville, film, theatre, radio and television.

== Early life ==
Tremayne was born in Balham, London. He moved with his family at the age of four to Chicago, Illinois, where he began in community theater. His mother, Dolly Tremayne, was a British actress. He danced as a vaudeville performer and worked as an amusement park barker. He began working in radio when he was 17 years old.

Tremayne studied Greek drama at Northwestern University and anthropology at Columbia University and the University of California, Los Angeles.

== Career ==
In 1974, Tremayne commented, "I've been in more than 30 motion pictures, but it's from radio ... that most people remember me."

His radio career began in 1931, and during the 1930s and 1940s, Tremayne was often heard in more than one show per week. Replacing Don Ameche, he starred in The First Nighter Program from 1936 to 1942. He starred in The Adventures of the Thin Man and The Romance of Helen Trent during the 1940s. He also starred in the title role in The Falcon, and played detective Pat Abbott in Abbott Mysteries from 1946 to 1947. Tremayne was once named one of the three most distinctive voices on American radio. The other two were Bing Crosby and president Franklin D. Roosevelt.

In his later years, Tremayne was active in Pacific Pioneer Broadcasters as the group's historian and archivist. Those roles included interviewing people who were active in early radio to provide source material for researchers. Pacific Pioneer Broadcasters materials are at American Radio Archives.

His film credits include A Man Called Peter, The Racket, The Angry Red Planet, The War of The Worlds, Say One for Me, North by Northwest, The Monolith Monsters, The Monster of Piedras Blancas, Fangs, and The Fortune Cookie.

Tremayne's Broadway credits include Detective Story (1949–1950) and Heads or Tails (1947).

Tremayne portrayed Billy Herbert in the television version of One Man's Family (1949–1955) and Inspector Richard Queen in The Further Adventures of Ellery Queen on NBC (1958–1959). He guest-starred in "The Life Story of Eve Drake and Howard Adams", a 1957 episode of the CBS situation comedy Mr. Adams and Eve.

In April 1960, Tremayne appeared as the father of the title character Maggie Hamilton, S3 E26 “The Maggie Hamilton Story”. In 1963, Tremayne appeared in the Perry Mason episode, "The Case of Constant Doyle", along with special guest attorney Bette Davis. He appeared in seven other episodes as various characters, such as Deputy District Attorney Stewart Linn in the 1960 episode, "The Case of the Madcap Modiste". In (1961), he played murder victim Willard Nesbitt and Bernard Daniels. in "The Case of the Angry Dead Man." and "The case of the Left-Handed Liar. In 1966, he played murderer Harry Lannon in "The Case of the Unwelcome Well". In 1964, he played Ed Pierce in "The Case of the Ruinous Road".

In 1962, Tremayne portrayed the part of C.J. Hasler, a known thief in The Andy Griffith Show episode entitled, "Andy and Barney in the Big City" aired on 26 March 1962. In that show, he played the part of a cunning opportunist who happens onto off-duty Barney Fife who himself believes that he is stalking a jewel thief (Allan Melvin) who is in fact the house detective of the hotel where the story takes place.

In 1965, Tremayne played Mr. Clary in My Favorite Martian, season 2, episode 30, titled "006 3/4".

In 1969, he lent his vocal talents to the Walt Kelly/Chuck Jones animated television special The Pogo Special Birthday Special. Other voice contributors were June Foray and both Chuck Jones and Walt Kelly themselves.

Between 1974 and 1977, Tremayne appeared on the Saturday morning Shazam! television series based on the DC Comics superhero Captain Marvel. In the role of Mentor, Tremayne served as the literal mentor of the program's protagonist, young Billy Batson.

One of his most iconic performances would come in 1983, as the voice of the Wishing Well in the Looney Tunes compilation film Daffy Duck's Fantastic Island.

In 1987, Tremayne appeared on General Hospital as Edward Quartermaine for six months, the oldest character in that series, as a temporary replacement for David Lewis. He played the deceased Victor Lord for one month on One Life to Live during the 1987 Heaven storyline in which daughter Vicki Lord Buchanan (Erika Slezak) was reunited with most every character that had died on the show after a heart attack left her in purgatory.

== Personal life ==
Tremayne was married four times. He had an afternoon talk show on WOR in 1949, The Tremaynes, with his second wife, Alice Reinhart, whom he married on 9 December 1945. His fourth wife, Joan, survived him in 2003.

== Death ==
Tremayne died on 19 December 2003, of heart failure at Saint John's Health Center in Santa Monica, California, at the age of 90.

== Legacy ==
Tremayne was elected to the National Radio Hall of Fame in 1995.

== Filmography ==
- The Racket (1951) as Harry Craig (Crime Commission chief investigator)
- The Blue Veil (1951) as Joplin
- Francis Goes to West Point (1952) as Colonel Daniels
- It Grows on Trees (1952) as Finlay Murchison
- Under the Red Sea (1952) as Narrator
- I Love Melvin (1953) as Mr. Henneman
- Dream Wife (1953) as Ken Landwell
- Tarzan and the She-Devil (1953) as Opening Off-Screen Narrator (voice, uncredited)
- The War of the Worlds (1953) as Major General Mann
- Susan Slept Here (1954) as Harvey Butterworth, Mark's Lawyer
- A Man Called Peter (1955) as Senator Willis K. Harvey
- The Lieutenant Wore Skirts (1956) as Henry 'Hank' Gaxton
- Forbidden Planet (1956) as Narrator (voice, uncredited)
- Bhowani Junction (1956) as Trailer Narrator (uncredited)
- The Iron Petticoat (1956) as Trailer Narrator (voice, uncredited)
- The Unguarded Moment (1956) as Mr. Pendleton
- Everything but the Truth (1956) as Lawrence 'Larry' Everett
- The Monolith Monsters (1957) as Martin Cochrane
- The Perfect Furlough (1958) as Colonel Leland
- From the Earth to the Moon (1958) as Countdown Announcer (uncredited)
- The Monster of Piedras Blancas (1959) as Dr. Sam Jorgenson
- Count Your Blessings (1959) as Trailer Narrator (voice, uncredited)
- Say One for Me (1959) as Harry LaMaise
- North by Northwest (1959) as Auctioneer
- The Angry Red Planet (1959) as Professor Theodore Gettell
- Alfred Hitchcock Presents (1960) (Season 6 Episode 1: "Mrs. Bixby and the Colonel's Coat") as Dr. Fred Bixby
- The Gallant Hours (1960) as Captain Frank Enright
- The Story of Ruth (1960) as Elimelech
- Alfred Hitchcock Presents (1960) (Season 6 Episode 27: "Deathmate") as Peter Talbot
- Rawhide (1961) (Season 3 Episode 12: "Incident at the Top of the World") as Dr. Gardner
- The Alfred Hitchcock Hour (1962) (Season 1 Episode 10: "Day of Reckoning") as Dr. Felix Ryder
- Shoot Out at Big Sag (1962) as Chan Bartholomew
- Perry Mason (1963) as Lawrence Otis in "Season 6, Episode 16: "The Case of the Constant Doyle"
- King Kong vs. Godzilla (1963) as Commander Roberts / General Shinzo / Narrator (voice, uncredited)
- Mutiny on the Bounty (1962) as Trailer Narrator (voice, uncredited)
- The Slime People (1963) as Norman Tolliver
- The Alfred Hitchcock Hour (1964) (Season 2 Episode 31: "Isabel") as Mr. Selby
- Goldfinger (1964) as Radio Newsman (voice, uncredited)
- Strange Bedfellows (1965) as Opening Off-Screen Narrator (uncredited)
- Girl Happy (1965) as Opening Narrator (voice, uncredited)
- Harum Scarum (1965) as Trailer Co-Narrator (voice, uncredited)
- War of the Planets (1966) as General Norton (English version, voice, uncredited)
- The Fortune Cookie (1966) as Thompson
- The Phantom Tollbooth (1970) as Humbug (voice)
- Strawberries Need Rain (1970) as The Reaper
- The Cricket in Times Square (1973) as Chester Cricket / Harry Cat / Papa Bellini / Mr. Smedley
- Oliver Twist (1974) as Fagin (voice)
- Fangs (1974) as Snakey Bender
- The Dukes of Hazzard (1982) (Season 5 Episode 6: "Big Daddy") as Boss Hogg's daddy Big Daddy credited)
- Daffy Duck's Fantastic Island (1983) as The Well (voice)
- Starchaser: The Legend of Orin (1985) as Arthur (voice)
- The Naked Monster (2005) as General Mann (posthumous release; final film role)
