= The Gay Falcon =

1941 film by Irving Reis

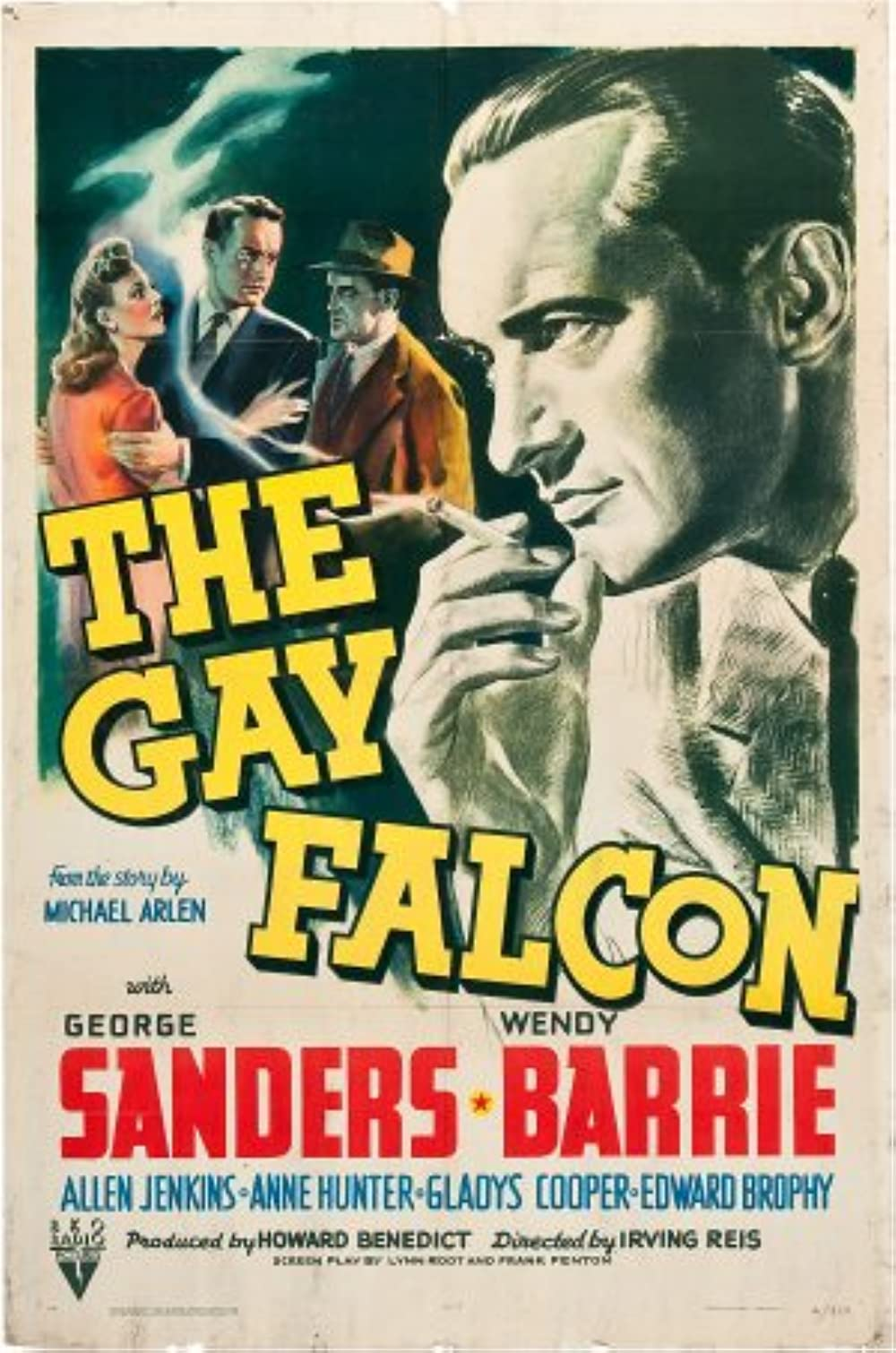
- Film poster
- Directed by: Irving Reis
- Screenplay by: Frank Fenton; Lynn Root
- Based on: "The Gay Falcon"; 1940 story inTown & Country by Michael Arlen
- Produced by: Howard Benedict
- Starring: George Sanders; Wendy Barrie; Allen Jenkins; Nina Vale; Gladys Cooper; Edward Brophy
- Cinematography: Nicholas Musuraca
- Edited by: George Crone
- Music by: Paul Sawtell
- Production company: RKO Radio Pictures
- Distributed by: RKO Radio Pictures
- Release date: October 24, 1941
- Running time: 67 minutes
- Country: United States
- Language: English

The Gay Falcon is a 1941 American mystery thriller film directed by Irving Reis and starring George Sanders, Wendy Barrie and Allen Jenkins. A B film produced and distributed by RKO Pictures, it the first in a series of sixteen films about a suave detective nicknamed The Falcon. Intended to replace the earlier The Saint detective series, the first film took its title from the lead character, Gay Laurence. (Note: Although Michael Arlen's character is named Gay Falcon, the name appears first as Gay Laurence then as "Gay Lawrence" in subsequent screen credits.) Sanders was cast in the title role; he had played Simon Templar/The Saint in the prior RKO series. He was teamed again with Wendy Barrie who had been with him in three previous Saint films. The first four films starred Sanders as Gay Lawrence and the rest featured Tom Conway, Sanders' real-life brother, as Tom Lawrence, brother of Gay.

== Plot ==
Ladies' man and amateur crime solver Gay Laurence, the Gay Falcon, reluctantly agrees to give up both habits to mollify his fiancée, Elinor Benford. He and his uncouth sidekick, Jonathan "Goldie" Locke, become unenthusiastic stockbrokers. When Elinor asks him to attend a party given by Maxine Wood to mingle with potential clients, he refuses. However, when Maxine asks for his help via pretty assistant Helen Reed, he cannot resist. It seems that Maxine's soirées have been plagued by jewel thefts and she is particularly worried about the diamond of her guest Vera Gardner.

At the party, Elinor becomes annoyed when she realises why Gay changed his mind about attending and retaliates by dancing with Manuel Retana. In frustration, she grabs the flower from Retana's lapel and flings it at Gay. He calmly picks it up and attaches it to his lapel. Gardner then insists on dancing with Gay; she hands him her diamond secretly, much to his puzzlement, then leaves the room. Moments later, a shot rings out and Gardner is dead. The killer is seen by Goldie as he makes his getaway.

Police Detectives Bates and Grimes take Goldie to the police station on suspicion of murder. Gay persuades Inspector Mike Waldeck to release Goldie so he can flush out the real murderer. Then he and Helen go to see Maxine, leaving Goldie in the car. While they are gone, Goldie is abducted by Noel Weber, Gardner's killer. Weber orders Goldie to call Gay to offer to trade Goldie's life for the diamond. However, Weber is shot and once again, Goldie is found by the police near a dead body.

By this point, Gay suspects Gardner arranged to have her diamond "stolen" so she could collect on the insurance. The flower was a signal, indicating to whom Gardner was to give the jewel. It should have been Retana. Gay and Helen break into his apartment but have to hide when Retana enters. He realizes someone has been there and opens a secret compartment to check if it has been found. Relieved, he leaves the room. Gay sneaks in and takes a gun he finds in the compartment, fairly certain it was used to shoot Weber. The police confirm it is the murder weapon.

Meanwhile, Gay calls Elinor to warn her to stay away from Retana but she believes he is lying out of jealousy and tells Retana so. Forewarned, Retana goes to Gay's apartment, ties up his servant Jerry and demands the diamond at gunpoint when Gay returns. He is frightened off when he mistakes Helen at the door for the police.

Now certain about his theory, Gay goes to see Maxine, taking Inspector Waldeck along. She tells them she has been receiving threats, so they stand guard in the living room while she sleeps. Retana enters through her bedroom window but when he lunges at her, Gay and Waldeck charge in. They are puzzled when Retana collapses and dies. Then Gay finds a hypodermic needle on the floor. Gay stops Maxine from stepping on it and destroying the incriminating fingerprints. He reveals that she, her husband Weber and Retana were responsible for the thefts. Maxine and Weber decided to betray Retana but he found out. Gay realized she must be involved when Goldie was kidnapped; nobody else knew where Goldie was at the time.

== Cast ==
- George Sanders as Gay Laurence/The Falcon
- Wendy Barrie as Helen Reed
- Allen Jenkins as Jonathan "Goldie" Locke
- Nina Vale as Elinor Benford
- Gladys Cooper as Maxine Wood
- Edward Brophy as Detective Bates
- Arthur Shields as Inspector Mike Waldeck
- Damian O'Flynn as Noel Weber
- Turhan Bey as Manuel Retana
- Eddie Dunn as Detective Grimes
- Lucile Gleason as Vera Gardner
- Willie Fung as Jerry

== Production ==
The Gay Falcon was intended by RKO Radio Pictures to introduce a replacement for The Saint series after RKO decided to sever ties with Leslie Charteris, the creator of The Saint who disapproved of the way the studio had been adapting his stories, especially with how George Sanders was playing the title character Simon Templar/The Saint. Renewing the film rights to the latter character would also be too expensive. After RKO decided to replace The Saint series, the studio began to search for a new mystery character similar to the Saint. Sanders, on loan to RKO from Twentieth Century-Fox, was retained in the lead role.

In March 1941, the studio bought the rights to Michael Arlen's story "The Gay Falcon", saying they intended Sanders and Wendy Barrie to star. They assigned Lynn Root and Frank Fenton to work on the script, resulting in Charteris suing RKO on the grounds that "the Falcon was the Saint in disguise." Filming started May 1941. At one stage RKO considered calling the film Meet the Falcon before reverting to The Gay Falcon. In June 1941 RKO announced the Falcon would be a series. In July, Sanders, Barrie and Allen Jenkins were announced for the second film A Date with the Falcon. In September 1941 RKO officially dropped The Saint series. In November, Fox gave RKO the right to make three more Falcon films with Sanders.

== Reception ==
On review aggregator website Rotten Tomatoes, the film holds an approval rating of 100% based on 1 review. In his review of Falcon series, Bosley Crowther wrote, in The New York Times, that, "There must be a Falcon series; RKO seems determined on that."The Gay Falcon made a profit of $108,000.
