= Joseph Ruscoll =

American writer (1906–1956)

- Born: Joseph Russcol; November 2, 1906; Boston, Massachusetts, U.S.
- Died: November 19, 1956 (aged 50); Jackson Heights, New York, U.S.
- Education: Suffolk Law School
- Occupations: Radio and television writer
- Spouse: Janet
- Children: 3
- Relatives: David Susskind (cousin); Norman Lear (cousin)
- Writing career
- Years active: 1939–1956

Joseph Ruscoll (born Joseph Russcol, November 2, 1906 – November 19, 1956) was an American radio and television writer, perhaps best known for his much produced and adapted radio drama, "The Creeper". Ruscoll was the cousin of producer/talk show host David Susskind and writer-producer Norman Lear.

== Early life and career ==
Born Joseph Russcol on November 2, 1906, in Boston, Massachusetts, he was one of three children born to Russian Jewish immigrants Etta (nee Rubin) and Louis Russcol In a brief interview conducted more than 35 years later, he recalled being "a skinny little kid [who] talked to myself and wore glasses".

Russcol attended the Jehuda Halevi Religious School in Boston, and later Suffolk Law School, graduating in 1928. The following year, he passed the bar in Massachusetts. At various points during that decade (presumably in order to help cover the cost of tuition), Russcol had worked in Boston, first as a bellhop, and later as a short-order cook.

During the nineteen thirties, Russcol practiced law in Boston for a number of years, before moving to New York, where he worked initially as "a Bowery social worker".

The first published mention of Ruscoll as a dramatist—as well as the first in-print usage of that slightly altered family-name spelling under which he would continue to be credited throughout his career—came in the fall of 1939, when the New York Daily News reported that Ruscoll's first published play, a comedy titled Mr. Silver Blows Town, was deemed "a sure thing" by two prominent literary agents, Audrey Wood and Maxim Lieber, both of whom began to shop the play around once they had "managed to stop laughing". The following April, the Arts section of The New York Times reported that both New York's Theatre Guild and noted producer / playwright-screenwriter Ben Hecht had expressed interest in the play, leading to speculation regarding a possible Broadway opening for the upcoming season. The story concludes with the barest thumbnail outline of Mr. Silver's plot, which concerns "the disappearance of the head of a house [and how that] affects other members of a family". In the meantime, the late-summer surfacing of Ruscoll's sophomore effort, Before the Sun Comes Down, was noted that August by agent Wood, via the New York Herald Tribune. In the end, notwithstanding the undeniable buzz generated by these stories, the next two theatre seasons came and went with no indication that either play had ever been—nor was about to be—produced by anyone, least of all on Broadway.

== Radio ==
Ruscoll made his radio writing debut in March 1942 on Columbia Workshop, with "The Test", and followed in June on Treasury Star Parade, with "A Modern Scrooge", starring Lionel Barrymore in the title role. By October, both of these scripts had become available to the public, the former via a radio writing textbook written by director Earle McGill, and the latter, in an anthology of TSP's best, penned by producer Bill Bacher.

In February 1943, actor Edmund Gwenn starred as Hercules Mulligan in "The Plot to Kidnap General Washington", an episode of Cavalcade of America adapted by Ruscoll and his wife Janet from information gathered by writer-researcher Carl Carmer. The play was produced at least once more on radio—in 1950, retitled "Mulligan the Mighty", starring James Gleason on CBS's Skippy Hollywood Theatre—and on television in a 1952 episode of NBC's Hallmark Hall of Fame, featuring Joshua Shelley.

On March 31, 1949, Edward G. Robinson starred in "You Can't Die Twice", an episode of Suspense adapted by Walter Newman from a story by Ruscoll.

== Television ==
It seems fitting that Ruscoll's first TV credit should involve his signature work. Adapted in 1949 by Frank Gabrielson for Suspense, "The Creeper" featured Nina Foch, the fifth of eight actresses to play Ruscoll's much imperiled protagonist. (Note: They were, in order of appearance: on radio, Charlotte Manson on Mollé Mystery Theatre, Ann Shepard on Murder at Midnight, Marilyn Erskine on Murder by Experts, Jan Miner on The Chase, and, on TV, Nina Foch, Mary K. Wells, Constance Ford, and Karen Allen.)

In Variety's review of "Nightmare", the fourth episode of CBS's recently unveiled Joseph Schildkraut Presents (and the first of 2 penned by Ruscoll), Land—aka Robert J. Landry, the trade paper's newly installed managing editor—cannot help but note the stark contrast between this and what he had been compelled to sit through just three weeks prior.

Its fourth Wednesday night show, 'Nightmare' by Joseph Ruscoll, made 100% more sense than the unfortunate debut script. Although dealing, as its title suggests, with a horror dream and produced with lots of tilted-camera shots, this one was light-years ahead in the department of plot intelligibility. Story was triangular and allowed a closeup treatment most of the way. It neatly fit Schildkraut himself as a sweet-talking but cheating spouse. [...] All in all, the imaginative and quasi-arty slants upon which the Schildkraut undertaking (really ambitious for DuMont) was premised now seems to be showing through.

== Personal life and death ==
From at least 1940 until his death, Ruscoll was married to fellow writer Janet Ruscoll. They had three children, the eldest being daughter Cynthia and son Ricky. The former, at least during her preteens, performed professionally as a ballet dancer, appearing in a production of The Nutcracker in 1955 at New York City Center.

On November 19, 1956, eighteen days after his fiftieth birthday, Russcoll suffered a fatal heart attack at his home in Jackson Heights, New York. He was survived by his wife and three children.

== Works ==
=== Radio ===
- Columbia Workshop
  - "The Test" (1942) – writer
  - "Anniversary" (1946) – writer
  - "Natural History of Nonsense" (1947) – adaptor
- Treasury Star Parade
  - "The Modern Scrooge" (1942) – writer
- Cavalcade of America
  - "The Plot to Kidnap General Washington" (1943) – adaptor
- Everything for the Girls
  - All episodes (1944) – written with Sgt. Virginia Rich
- Colgate Theatre of Romance
  - "One Sunday Afternoon" (1944) – adaptor
  - "Accent on Youth" (1944) – adaptor
  - "Miracle in the Rain" (1945) – adaptor
- Mollé Mystery Theatre
  - "The Creeper" (1946) – writer
  - "The Further Adventures of Kenny Andrews" (1946) - writer
  - "Triangle of Death" (1947) - writer
  - "Kenny Andrews Returns" (1947) – writer
  - "Primer for Murder" (1947) – writer
  - "Five Bullets for Baldwin" (1948) – writer
- Studio One
  - "Wuthering Heights" (1947) – adaptor
- Suspense
  - "Break-Up" (1948) – writer
  - "You Can't Die Twice" (1949) – author
- Murder by Experts
  - "Prescription for Murder" (1949) – writer
  - "The Creeper" (1949) – writer (as Joe Russell)
  - "Dig Your Own Grave" (1949) – writer
  - "I Dreamt I Died" (1949) – writer
  - "The Case of the Missing Mind" (1949) – writer
- The MGM Theater of the Air
  - "Hideout" (1949) – adaptor
- Skippy Hollywood Theatre
  - "Mulligan the Mighty" (1950) – written by (with Janet Ruscoll)
- The Chase
  - "The Creeper" (1953) – writer

=== Television ===
- Suspense
  - Season 1 Episode 6 "The Creeper" (1949) - story
- The Clock
  - Season 1 Episode 31 "Lease of Death" (1949) – adaptation
  - Season 1 Episode 36 "Who Is This Man?" (1950) – written by
  - Season 1 Episode 37 "Dig Your Own Grave" (1950) – written by
- Robert Montgomery Presents
  - Season 2 Episode 6 "The Canterville Ghost" (1950) – adaptation
- Big Town
  - Season 1 Episode 26 "Anything for Money" (1951) – Writer
  - Season 1 Episode 35 "Honeymoon Cottage" (1951) – written by
  - Season 1 Episode 37 "The First Robin" (1951) – written by
  - Season 1 Episode 44 "The Turning Point" (1951) – Writer
  - Season 1 Episode 45 "Success Story" (1951) – written by
  - Season 1 Episode 35 "Many Happy Returns" (1951) – written by
  - Season 2 Episode 4 "The Juke Box" (1951) – written by
  - Season 2 Episode 5 "The Fifth Floor" (1951) – written by
  - Season 2 Episode 7 "The Three Rs" (1951) – written by
  - Season 2 Episode 10 "The Doll" (1951) – written by
  - Season 2 Episode 14 "Solitaire" (1951) – written by
  - Season 2 Episode 17 "The Canary Shop" (1951) – written by
  - Season 2 Episode 21 "The Laundress" (1951) – written by
- The Web
  - Season 1 Episode 22 "The Creeper" (1950) – written by
  - Season 1 Episode 55 "Breakup" (1951) – adaptation
  - Season 1 Episode 59 "The Edge of Error" (1951) – adaptation
  - Season 4 Episode 43 "The Treadmill" (1954) – written by
- Lux Video Theatre
  - Season 2 Episode 7 "Route 19" (1951) – adaptation
- Hallmark Hall of Fame
  - Season 1 Episode 8 "The Plot to Kidnap General Washington" (1952) – writer
- Eyewitness
  - Season 1 Episode 2 "Apartment 4-D" (1953) – written by
  - Season 1 Episode 3 "Dilemma" (1963) – adaptation
- Harlem Detective
  - Season 1 Episode 2 "Pay You Saturday" (1953) – written by
- Joseph Schildkraut Presents
  - Season 1 Episode 4 "Nightmare" (1953) – writer
  - Season 1 Episode 12 "Claim Check" (1954) – writer
- Ford Television Theatre
  - Season 2 Episode 3 "Ever Since the Day" (1953) – original
  - Season 5 Episode 14 "Fear Has Many Faces" (1957) – story
- The Stranger
  - Season 1 Episode 23 "Eyewitness" (1954) – written by
- The Pepsi-Cola Playhouse
  - "A Husband Disappears" (1955) – writer
- The Big Story
  - Season 6 Episode 39 "A Sound Like the Wind" (1955) – written by
- Your Play Time
  - Season 3 Episode 7 "A Husband Appears" (1955) – writer
- Alfred Hitchcock Presents
  - Season 1 Episode 14 "A Bullet for Baldwin" (1956) – story
  - Season Episode "The Creeper" (1956) – story
- Alfred Hitchcock Presents
  - Season 1 Episode "The Creeper" (1986) – story
