= Karz (film) =

1980 Indian film by Subhash Ghai

- Film poster
- Directed by: Subhash Ghai
- Written by: Dr. Rahi Masoom Reza(dialogue)
- Screenplay by: Sachin Bhowmick
- Produced by: Akhtar Farooqui; Jagjit Khurana
- Starring: Rishi Kapoor; Tina Munim; Simi Garewal; Raj Kiran; Pran; Prem Nath; Pinchoo Kapoor; Mac Mohan
- Cinematography: Kamalakar Rao
- Edited by: Waman Bhonsle; Gurudutt Shirali
- Music by: Laxmikant–Pyarelal; Anand Bakshi (Lyrics)
- Distributed by: Mukta Arts Ltd.
- Release date: 11 June 1980
- Running time: 157 mins
- Country: India
- Language: Hindi

Karz (transl. Debt) is a 1980 Indian Hindi-language fantasy psychological thriller film directed by Subhash Ghai, starring Rishi Kapoor and Tina Munim in the lead with Simi Garewal in the role of Kamini Verma, the murderous wife, which won her a Filmfare nomination. The film's music was given by Laxmikant–Pyarelal. They went on to win Filmfare Best Music Director Award for this film and Anand Bakshi received two Filmfare nominations for the lyrics of these two songs.

== Plot ==
The film begins with Ravi Verma winning a court case against the villain Sir Judah, who had unjustly usurped the wealth and property of Ravi's father, Shanta Prasad Verma, after his death. Ravi calls his widowed mother and younger sister to share the good news and that he is marrying his girlfriend, Kamini, who is actually a gold-digger working for Judah, unbeknownst to him. On their way home to Coonoor, Kamini in a well planned murder using a jeep slams Ravi over the cliff to his death near a small temple of the Goddess Kali. Distraught at the sudden death of her son, Ravi's mother demands justice from the Goddess Lakshmi to allow her son to pay his mother's debt for dying prematurely at a very young age. While Kamini the girl friend inherits everything that is Ravi Vermas wealth and palatial home.

Two decades later, Ravi is reborn as Monty, who is an orphan raised by the wealthy person G.G. Oberoi and Monty is a professional singer. He begins to have visions of Ravi's memories triggered by a tune that used to be Ravi's favourite song (Ek Hasina thi) .

Monty's doctors jokingly states that maybe he could be Ravi's reincarnation, and he should just take a short vacation and rest in all seriousness. Monty travels to Ooty (coincidentally near Coonoor) where Tina lives and they fall in love. Tina tells him that she was brought up by a woman she addresses as Rani Sahiba, and her uncle, Kabira, who is released from prison after having served ten years for murder. As Monty explores the area and he learns the story of the Verma family from the locals, including that Ravi's mother and younger sister were banished from their palatial home by Kamini, he starts to experience more of Ravi's old memories which become more intense with time. He is later shocked to find out that Tina's - Rani Sahiba and Kamini are one and the same person.

Kabira then reveals to Monty that Tina's father was murdered by Kamini's brother after overhearing a secret involving Ravi and the temple of Kali. In retaliation, Kabira killed Kamini's brother which is why he was arrested by the police. Pretending to be aware of Kamini's secret, Kabira blackmailed her in prison to raise Tina with a proper education. Monty in kind reveals to Kabira his connection to Ravi Verma, and that they must find Ravi's estranged family, with whom Monty is united. His old mother recognises him as her own son when they meet, in spite of being born in another body and as a different person and accepting that he is Ravi's reincarnation, Monty is able to piece together Ravi's murder.

To set things right, Monty and Kabira gradually trick Kamini into believing that Ravi's ghost is seeking revenge from her. In their final trick, Monty and Tina perform at a local school opening function attended by Kamini, where they dramatise Ravi's story on stage performance.

Kamini is horrified to hear the old song that Monty sings on stage with Tina, reminding her of Ravi. She also sees Ravi's mother, sister and escapes in fear, agonised by her own past. When Monty confronts her, Kamini confesses to Ravi's murder, which is recorded by the police. However, Judah holds Tina hostage and offers her in exchange for Kamini. Just as the exchange is about to take place, Tina jumps on Kamini causing a melee (hand to hand combat/ confusion) Kabira and Monty gain the upper-hand but Judah locks Ravi's mother and sister in a house and sets it ablaze. Monty saves them, and kills Judah in the fire. Kamini escapes in a jeep but Monty pursues her. She tries to throw Monty off the cliff at the temple of Kali the same way she killed Ravi, but this time Monty jumps away safely, causing Kamini to drive off the cliff and meet her death. In the end, the Verma wealth and property is returned back to Ravi's family and Monty marries Tina.

== Cast ==
Actor	Role	Notes
Rishi Kapoor	Monty	Rockstar who is the reincarnation of Ravi Verma
Raj Kiran	Ravi Verma	Scion of the Verma empire who is reincarnated as Monty
Simi Garewal	Kaamini	Ravi Verma's widow
Tina Munim	Tina	Monty's love interest
Pran	Kabira	Tina's uncle
Premnath	Sir Judah	
Durga Khote	Shanta Prasad Verma	Ravi Verma's mother
Abha Dhulia	Jyoti Verma (Pinky)	Ravi Verma's sister
Jalal Agha	Dr. Dayal	Monty's friend
Pinchoo Kapoor	G.G. Oberoi	Monty's mentor
Iftekhar	Dr. Daniel	Monty's doctor
Aruna Irani	Dancer	Guest appearance in the song "Kamaal Hai"
Mac Mohan	Sir Judah's man Rafiq	The man who translates Sir Judah
Mukri	College Principal Kanhaiya	
Birbal	Daanya Karan Srivastav	Kabira's right hand man
Viju Khote	Baanya Damodar	Kabira's left hand man
Yusuf Khan	Roxi	Kabira's rival
Kamaldeep	Advocate P.P. Roy	Sir Judah's Lawyer

== Soundtrack ==
Karz

Soundtrack album by Laxmikant–Pyarelal
- Released: 1980 (India)
- Genre: Film soundtrack
- Label: Saregama / EMI
- Producer: Laxmikant–Pyarelal

Laxmikant–Pyarelal chronology
Jyoti Bane Jwala (1980)	Karz (1980)	Be-Reham (1980)

The soundtrack of the film includes tracks composed by Laxmikant-Pyarelal, with lyrics by Anand Bakshi, who received two Filmfare nominations for the songs, "Om Shanti Om" and "Dard-E-Dil". Laxmikant-Pyarelal won the trophy for Best Music Director of the year.

Kishore Kumar supplied Monty's singing voice in all of the songs, except "Dard-E-Dil" (performed by Mohammed Rafi).

#	Song	Singer
1	"Om Shanti Om"	Kishore Kumar
2	"Paisa Yeh Paisa"	Kishore Kumar
3	"Tu Kitne Baras Ki, Tu Kitne Baras Ka"	Kishore Kumar, Lata Mangeshkar
4	"Ek Hasina Thi"	Kishore Kumar, Asha Bhosle
5	"Kamaal Hai, Kamaal Hai"	Kishore Kumar, Manna Dey, Anuradha Paudwal
6	"Dard-E-Dil, Dard-E-Jigar Dil Mein Jagaaya Aap Ne"	Mohammed Rafi
7	"Theme Music"	Gorakh Sharma

Two songs are set in Hindustani ragas: "Om Shanti Om" (Bhoopali) and "Dard-E-Dil" (Alhaiya Bilaval).

== Reception ==
At the box office, the film grossed ₹55 million (US$6.98 million).

In a 2008 interview, film director Subhash Ghai said the film was ahead of its time and was thus panned by critics of the times, and flopped at the box office. It was only years later that it started being considered a classic and even remade several times over.

== Influence and legacy ==
Though the theme of reincarnation was earlier handled in Madhumati (1958) and Mehbooba (1976), and later Kudrat (1981), the modern twist with the murder and revenge angle in Karz was a contemporary pot-boiler. Film critic Anupama Chopra also cites The Reincarnation of Peter Proud (1975, J. Lee Thompson), an adaptation of a 1974 novel of the same name by Max Ehrlich, as an influence on the film.

Karz went on to inspire several other Indian remakes, notably Yuga Purusha (1989) in Kannada, Enakkul Oruvan (1984) in Tamil, Aatmabalam (1985) in Telugu, Baazi (1999) in Odia, Main Ek Din Laut Ke Aaunga (2007) in Pakistan, and the Hindi film Karzzzz (2008), starring Himesh Reshammiya. Karz may have also inspired the American film Chances Are (1989).

The songs of the film inspired several film titles, notably Dard-E-Dil (1983), Paisa Yeh Paisa (1985), Main Solah Baras Ki (1998), Ek Hasina Thi (2004), Aashiq Banaya Aapne (2005) and Om Shanti Om (2007), which was seen as a light-hearted tribute to the film, as it borrowed many elements from it.

== Awards ==
28th Filmfare Awards:

Won

- Best Music Director – Laxmikant–Pyarelal

Nominated

- Best Supporting Actress – Simi Garewal
- Best Lyricist – Anand Bakshi for "Dard-E-Dil"
- Best Lyricist – Anand Bakshi for "Om Shanti Om"
- Best Male Playback Singer – Kishore Kumar for "Om Shanti Om"
- Best Male Playback Singer – Mohammed Rafi for "Dard-E-Dil"
