= Columbia Workshop =

Radio series

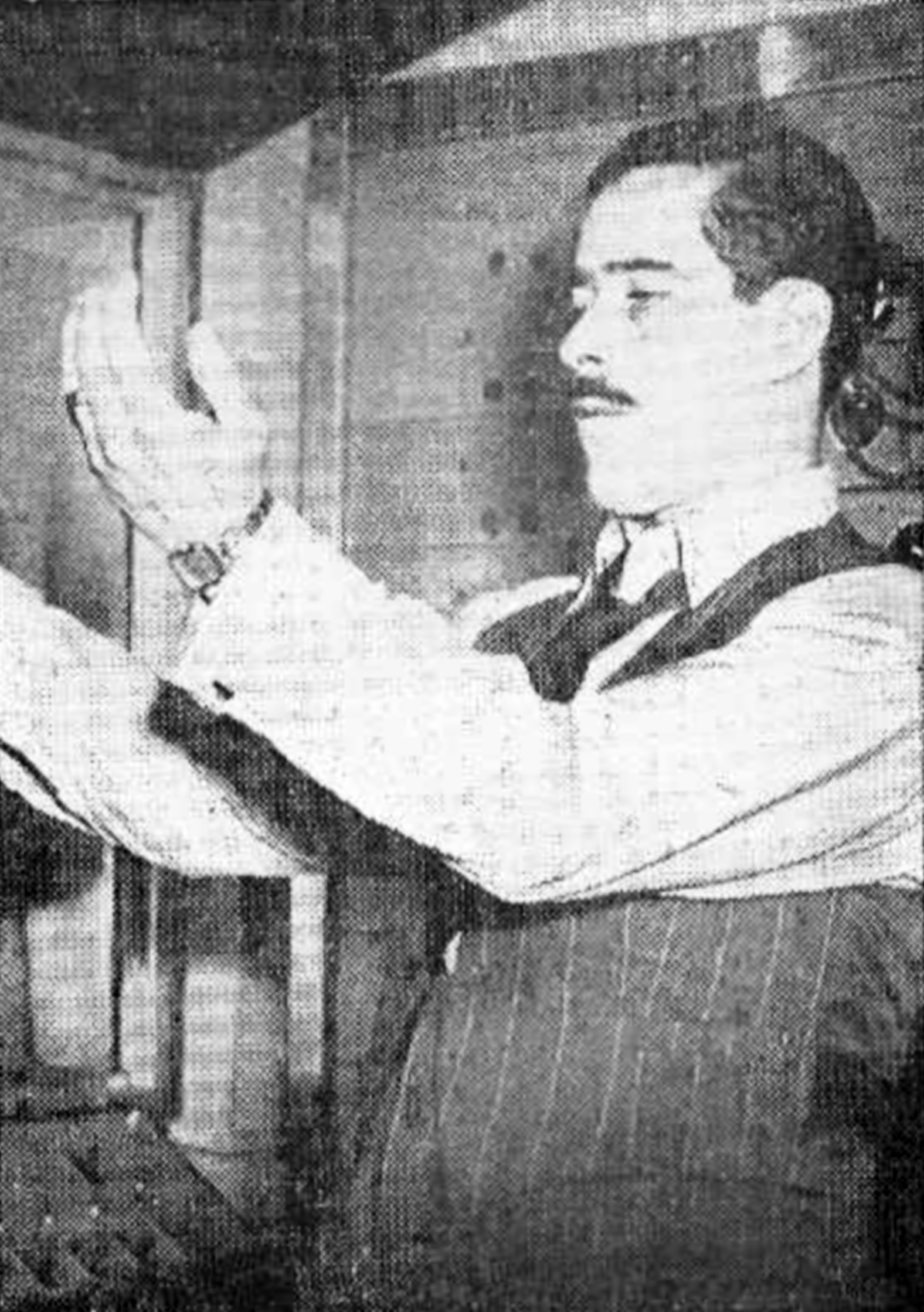
Radio drama director William N. Robson

Columbia Workshop was a radio series that aired on the Columbia Broadcasting System from 1936 to 1943, returning in 1946–47.

== Irving Reis ==
The series began as the idea of Irving Reis. Reis had begun his radio career as an engineer and developed a fascination with the possibilities of the relatively new medium. His idea was to use experimental modes of narrative to enhance the way a narrative was conveyed over the radio. Reis had isolated attempts to experiment on the radio: Before the Columbia Workshop's debut, he had directed at least a few radio dramas. For Reis, the Columbia Workshop was a platform for developing new techniques for presentation on radio as noted in the debut broadcast:

The Columbia Workshop dedicates itself to the purposes of familiarizing you with the story behind radio, both in broadcasting, as well as in aviation, shipping, communication and pathology, and to experiment in new techniques with a hope of discovering or evolving new and better forms of radio presentation, with especial emphasis on radio drama; to encourage and present the work of new writers and artists who may have fresh and vital ideas to contribute.

As a sustaining program, the Workshop served as a symbol to prove to the public (and the Federal Communications Commission) that CBS was concerned with educating and serving the public.

Early shows on the Workshop exemplified Reis's penchant for experimentation through narrative and technical means. The second program, Broadway Evening followed a couple as they meandered down Broadway during an evening. A subsequent show had at least 30 characters functioning within a half-hour drama. Among the technical demonstrations were sound effects, the use of various kinds of microphones to achieve various aural effects and voice impersonators (including sound effects produced by voice).

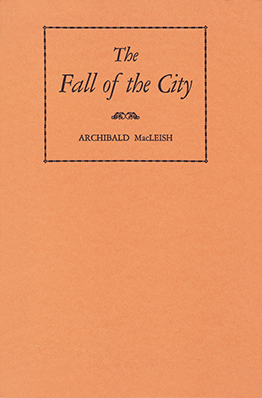
The Fall of the City, Archibald MacLeish's verse play for radio, was published by Farrar & Rinehart following its Columbia Workshop premiere on April 11, 1937.

Reis called upon others to try their hand in writing new or adapting existing material for the experimental nature of the Workshop. Orson Welles did a two-part adaptation of Shakespeare's Hamlet (mentioned along with the Workshop in the fictitious film Me and Orson Welles), as well as a 30-minute condensation of Macbeth. Irwin Shaw contributed one show, and Stephen Vincent Benét adapted several of his short stories. Reis also experimented with readings and dramatizations of poetry, including works by Samuel Taylor Coleridge, John Masefield and Edgar Allan Poe. One of the most notable presentations of Reis's tenure was Archibald MacLeish's original radio play, The Fall of the City. With a cast that included Burgess Meredith, Orson Welles and 300 students, the play was notable for its portrayal of the collapse of a city under an unnamed dictator, a commentary on fascism in Germany and Italy.

Reis recognized music as an important part of radio presentation. As part of CBS's commissioning of five classical composers to write original works for radio, Deems Taylor narrated a concert (November 7, 1936) which demonstrated the possibilities of idiomatic music composition for radio by playing orchestrations of three works by staff arranger Amadeo de Fillipi.

Among the most significant musical contributions Reis made was appointing Bernard Herrmann music director of the Workshop. Herrmann had previously worked on CBS primarily as a conductor. He had composed his first radio drama for the Workshop, but it was only after his second program, Rhythm of the Jute Mill (broadcast December 12, 1936) that the appointment was made. Thereafter Herrmann composed many radio shows himself, also conducting the music of others and even proposing a show entirely devoted to music composed for the Workshop.

Other significant musical contributions during Reis's directorship include Paul Sterrett's and Leith Stevens's score for a two-part presentation of Alice in Wonderland in which music took the place of all sound effects, and Marc Blitzstein's half-hour musical I've Got the Tune, which similarly tried to convey sound effects and long-distance travel through purely musical means.

== William N. Robson ==
On the broadcast of December 23, 1937 (the first of a two-part dramatization of Lewis Carroll's Alice Through the Looking-Glass), it was announced that William N. Robson had succeeded Irving Reis as director of the Columbia Workshop. Reis moved to Hollywood and continued his career in the film industry. Though the Workshop continued some experimentation, Robson placed greater emphasis on good dramatic adaptations, rather than didactic explanations of radio techniques.

Robson was not averse to experimentation. His San Quentin Prison Break, originally broadcast prior to the Workshop on January 16, 1935 was based on an actual incident. To achieve a sense of realism, the dramatization was a combination news report or documentary. Unlike most radio dramas, there was no narrator involved. This was later rebroadcast as part of the Workshop on September 10, 1936.

Under Robson's aegis, the Workshop was able to broadcast a number of notable shows. Known more as a film director, Pare Lorentz wrote and directed Ecce Homo, a story concerning the relationship of man and technology. Both Irwin Shaw and Archibald MacLeish were invited back to write and direct shows as they had done under Reis's leadership. The Workshop extended its experimental mode by preceding the new MacLeish play, Air Raid with a broadcast of its rehearsal. Stephen Vincent Benèt continued to write for the Workshop, and author Wilbur Daniel Steele made his own adaptations of his previously written short stories. Arch Oboler, known for Lights Out! series, contributed one script, as did Thornton Wilder and budding writer Arthur Laurents.

At times, Robson reached beyond the typical crop of radio authors, selecting at least one script (Anita Fairgrieve's Andrea del Sarto), from his class in radio writing at New York University as well as soliciting scripts on the air from the listening audience.

With Bernard Herrmann continuing as music director, Robson (probably at Herrmann's insistence) included a few extended musical works and opera on the Workshop. Frederick Delius's Hassan, and two operas by Vittorio Giannini, Beauty and the Beast and Blennerhasset, were among those heard. Robson apparently stepped down sometime in mid-1939, after which the Workshop was somewhat adrift. Brewster Morgan and Earle McGill are credited as being those responsible for continuing the series.

== Norman Corwin ==
Norman Corwin had been a rising star at CBS for a few years, and had even some of his work aired on the Workshop as early as 1938, when his adaptation of Stephen Crane's The Red Badge of Courage aired. But his sense of social justice again changed the direction of the Workshop into one frequently addressing current issues. By the fall 1940, Corwin was leading the Workshop, and in 1941, the series was giving the subtitle 26 by Corwin, attesting to the author's seemingly indefatigable energy. Given Corwin's strong interest in issues of the day, it is ironic he left the Workshop just one month prior to the bombing of Pearl Harbor.

== Final years ==
It is not entirely clear who led the Columbia Workshop during 1942, but interest in the program was clearly waning. There were a few significant programs (historically the most interesting of them is probably the airing of John Cage's and Kenneth Patchen's The City Wears a Slouch Hat). There are only a few references to shows in 1943. The show had a revival in the 1946–47 season. When it was revived in 1956, it was retitled the CBS Radio Workshop.

== Radio techniques ==
The Columbia Workshop gave authors, directors, sound engineers and composers many opportunities to experiment with the use of sound as a device for enhancing narrative.

=== Sound filters ===
Buck Rogers was broadcast from a 21st-floor studio that had been troubled with air conditioning noises. At a bend in a duct the air gave a whoosh that had been difficult to dampen. Later, when it became necessary to suggest a rocket traveling through outer space, someone remembered the duct and put a microphone in the bend. Whenever Buck Rogers was on the move, the microphone was opened, producing the sound of a spaceship. This was the first development in sound filters.

Filters developed upon the need for radio directors to find a way to portray a voice over the telephone. The filters were generally small boxes through which a microphone circuit could be shunted. The box had dials on its surface. Its inner mechanism could remove upper or lower tones or a combination of them to give an incomplete reproduction, as given by a telephone. The dials allowed the engineer to vary the effect, creating varieties of incompleteness. It became common for radio personnel to play around with the filters to find new sounds, and then having radio shows based upon their discoveries.

== Staff ==
Many of the staff who worked on the Columbia Workshop would continue with CBS and work for television.

- Bernard Herrmann, composer
- Earle McGill, writer, director
- Irving Reis, writer, director
- William N. Robson, writer, director
- Leith Stevens, composer
- Guy Della-Cioppa, writer

== Award ==
The Columbia Workshop received a 1946 Peabody Award for Outstanding Entertainment in Drama.

== List of Columbia Workshop programs ==
This is a list of all the Columbia Workshop programs, giving known information about authors, adaptors, directors/producers, composers. Occasional remarks have been included. Gaps in dates usually refer to programs that were pre-empted. Information for the years 1942–43 is difficult to come by.

Date	Title	Writer	Adaptation	Director/Producer	Music	Remarks
July 18, 1936	A Comedy of Danger	Richard Hughes	-	Myron Sattler	-	First show
July 18, 1936	The Finger of God	Percival Wilde	-	Myron Sattler	-	First show
July 25, 1936	Broadway Evening	Leopold Proser	-	Irving Reis	-	-
August 1, 1936	Technical Demonstration	-	-	Irving Reis	-	-
August 1, 1936	Cartwheel	Vic Knight	-	Irving Reis	-	-
August 8, 1936	Experiment	Mary Parkington	-	Irving Reis	-	-
August 8, 1936	Highway Incident	Brian J. Byrne	-	Irving Reis	-	-
August 15, 1936	Case History	Milton M. E. Geiger	-	Irving Reis	-	Fantasy of pilot in airline crash
August 22, 1936	The March of the Molecules	Orestes H. Caldwell (FRC commissioner)	-	Irving Reis	-	Demonstration of how radio works
August 22, 1936	There Must Be Something Else	Helen Bergovoy	-	Irving Reis	-	
September 5, 1936	San Quentin Prison Break	William N. Robson	-	William N. Robson	-	Rebroadcast of a play originally broadcast January 16, 1935
September 12, 1936	Voyage to Brobdingnag	Jonathan Swift	Leopold Proser	Irving Reis	-	-
September 19, 1936	Hamlet, Acts 1-2	William Shakespeare	Orson Welles	Orson Welles	-	-
September 26, 1936	The Dream Maker	Charles Burton	-	Irving Reis	-	Fantasy of how dreams are made
September 26, 1936	Shadows That Walk In	-	-	Irving Reis	-	Ghost analysis
October 3, 1936	St. Louis Blues					
October 10, 1936	Sound Demonstration					
October 17, 1936	Dauber	John Masefield	Burke Boyce	Irving Reis	Bernard Herrmann	
October 24, 1936	Letting the Cat Out of the Bag	-	-	-	-	Interview on vocal sound effects with Brad Barker and Madeleine Pearce
November 7, 1936	Music for Radio	Narration by Deems Taylor	-	Davidson Taylor	Debussy: Golliwogg's Cakewalk, Schumann: Traumerei, Bizet: Farandole (from L'Arlesienne Suite) orchestrated by Amadeo di Fillipi	To illustrate idiomatic use of radio orchestration for the Columbia Composers' Commission
November 14, 1936	Hamlet, acts 3-5	William Shakespeare	Orson Welles	Orson Welles	-	
November 21, 1936	The Use of Theaters for Broadcasts	E. E. Free	-	Irving Reis	-	Electrical demonstration
November 21, 1936	2000 Were Chosen	E.P. Conkle	-	Irving Reis	-	-
November 28, 1936	The American Patent System	Irving Reis	-	Irving Reis	-	Honoring 100th Anniversary of the U.S. Patent Office
December 12, 1936	Rhythm of the Jute Mill	William N. Robson	-	William N. Robson	Bernard Herrmann	-
December 19, 1936	The Gods of the Mountains	Lord Dunsany	-	-	Bernard Herrmann	-
December 26, 1936	The Happy Prince	Oscar Wilde	-	Irving Reis	Bernard Herrmann	-
January 2, 1937	Public Domain	Eustis Wyatt	-	Earle McGill	-	Fantasy of PD characters yearning for release from stories
January 9, 1937	Interview with a Control Engineer, part 1	van Voorhees, control engineer	-	-	Clyde Borne, singer	Control sound engineering
January 9, 1937	A Voyage to Lilliput	Jonathan Swift	(Irving Reis?)	Irving Reis	-	Control sound engineering
January 16, 1937	Interview with a Control Engineer, part 2	-	-	-	-	microphone mixing
January 16, 1937	An Incident of the Cosmos	Paul Y. Anderson	-	Irving Reis	Bernard Herrmann	Extraterrestrials witness the end of Earth
January 23, 1937	The Signal-Man	Charles Dickens	-	Irving Reis and Earle McGill	-	-
January 30, 1937	Evolution of the Negro Spiritual	-	-	Irving Reis	arrangements by Clyde Barry & Helen Bergeron	-
February 6, 1937	Rime of the Ancient Mariner	Samuel Taylor Coleridge	Leopold Proser	Irving Reis	Bernard Herrmann	-
February 13, 1937	Sound and the Human Ear	Narrated by Dr. John Steinberg	-	Irving Reis(and pro.)	-	demonstration of pitch perception
February 28, 1937	Macbeth	William Shakespeare	Orson Welles	Orson Welles	Bernard Herrmann	-
March 7, 1937		-	-	-	-	(unidentified show)
March 14, 1937	Split Seconds	Irving Reis	-	Irving Reis	Bernard Herrmann	Script first broadcast in 1931
March 21, 1937	Danse Macabre	Helen Bergeron, George Zachary	-	Irving Reis	Camille Saint-Saëns	-
March 28, 1937	Eve of St. Agnes	John Keats	Edward A. Byron	Edward A. Byron	-	-
April 4, 1937	Big Ben	John Mossman	-	John Mossman	-	-
April 4, 1937	Crisis	Roy Winsower	-	Roy Winsower	-	-
April 11, 1937	The Fall of the City	Archibald MacLeish	-	Irving Reis	Bernard Herrmann	-
April 18, 1937	R.U.R. (Rossum's Universal Robots)	Karel Čapek	-	Irving Reis	Bernard Herrmann	-
April 25, 1937	St. Louis Blues	Irving Reis	-	Irving Reis	Blues by W.C. Handy	Orig. written in 1932; first play for radio about radio; First heard on the Workshop Oct. 3, 1936
May 2, 1937	Drums of Conscience	-	-	Irving Reis	-	-
May 9, 1937	Supply and Demand	Irwin Shaw	-	Irving Reis	Bernard Herrmann	Worthington Minor, "director of dialogue and staging"
May 16, 1937	Paul Revere	Stephen Vincent Benét	-		Bernard Herrmann	-
May 23, 1937	A Night at an Inn	Lord Dunsany	-	Irving Reis	Debussy, conducted by Bernard Herrmann	-
May 30, 1937	Discoverie	Merrill Denison	-	Irving Reis	Bernard Herrmann	-
June 6, 1937	Downbeat on Murder	Charles Tazewell	-	Irving Reis	Bernard Herrmann	voices change into musical notes
June 13, 1937	The Young King	Oscar Wilde	-	Irving Reis	-	-
June 20, 1937	Red-Head Baker	Albert Maltz	-	Joseph Losey	Bernard Herrman	-
June 27, 1937	Babouk	Guy Endore	Lester Fuller	Edward A. Blatt, Irving Reis	Bernard Herrman	-
July 4, 1937	Mr. Sycamore	Robert Ayre	Leonard Proser	-	Bernard Herrmann	-
July 11, 1937	The Tell-Tale Heart	Edgar Allan Poe	Charles Tazewell	Irving Reis	Bernard Herrmann	Used sounds of real heartbeats
July 18, 1937	Fifty Grand	Ernest Hemingway	-		Bernard Herrmann	-
July 25, 1937	A Matter of Life and Death	Leopold Atlas	-	Irving Reis	-	-
August 1, 1937	Daniel Webster and the Sea Serpent	Stephen Vincent Benét	Sheldon Stark	Irving Reis	Bernard Herrmann	-
August 8, 1937	An Incident of the Cosmos(rep)	Paul Y. Anderson	-	Irving Reis	Bernard Herrmann	-
August 8, 1937	Last Citation	John Whedon	-	Irving Reis	Bernard Herrmann	-
August 15, 1937	Escape (part 1)	John Galsworthy	Leopold Proser	Irving Reis	Bernard Herrmann	-
August 22, 1937	Escape (part 2)	John Galsworthy	Leopold Proser	Irving Reis	Bernard Herrmann	-
August 29, 1937	The Half-Pint Flask	Dubose Heyward	Irving Reis	William N. Robson	(Victor Young?)	-
August 30, 1937	Twelfth Night	William Shakespeare	Orson Welles	Orson Welles, director, John Houseman, producer	-	Includes readings by Pepys, Manningham, Mazlitt, and Brandes
September 5, 1937	S.S. San Pedro	James G. Cozzens	Betsy Tuttle	William N. Robson	Charles Paul	James Gould Cozzens
September 12, 1937	Death of a Queen	Hilaire Belloc	Val Gielgud	Val Gielgud	-	Originated from BBC in London
September 19, 1937	Riders to the Sea	John Millington Synge	-	Irving Reis	-	Originated from Dublin, Ireland
September 26, 1937	Alice in Wonderland, part 1	Lewis Carroll	William N. Robson	William N. Robson	Paul Sterrett	-
October 3, 1937	Alice in Wonderland, part 2	Lewis Carroll	William N. Robson	William N. Robson	Paul Sterrett and Leith Stevens	-
October 10, 1937	Meridian 7-1212	Irving Reis	-	Irving Reis	Bernard Herrmann	-
October 17, 1937	The Killers	Ernest Hemingway	Irving Reis	Irving Reis	-	-
October 17, 1937	Illusion	Georgia Backus	-	Georgia Backus	-	-
October 24, 1937	I've Got the Tune	Marc Blitzstein	-		Marc Blitzstein	-
October 31, 1937	Sweepstakes	Irving Reis & Charles Martin	-	Irving Reis & Charles Martin	Bernard Herrmann	-
November 7, 1937	The Horla	Guy de Maupassant	Charles Tazewell	Irving Reis	Bernard Herrmann	-
November 14, 1937	Mr. Justice	Irving Reis	-		-	-
November 21, 1937	Georgia Transport	John Williams Andrews	-	Irving Reis	Bernard Herrmann	Repeat from Sept. 27, 1937
November 28, 1937	First Violin	Norman Davey	Sally Russell	Irving Reis	-	-
December 2, 1937	-	-	-	-	-	(unidentified show)
December 9, 1937	Marconi	-	Orrin Dunlap	-	Bernard Herrmann	-
December 16, 1937	Metzengerstein	Edgar Allan Poe	Charles Tazewell	Irving Reis	Bernard Herrmann	-
December 23, 1937	Alice Through the Looking-Glass, part 1	Lewis Carroll	William N. Robson	William N. Robson	Paul Sterrett and Leith Stevens	Robson succeeds Reis as head of Columbia Workshop
December 30, 1937	Alice Through the Looking-Glass, part 2	Lewis Carroll	William N. Robson	William N. Robson	Paul Sterrett and Leith Stevens	-
January 8, 1938	The Ghost of Benjamin Sweet, part 1					
January 15, 1938	The House That Jack Didn't Build	Alfred Kreymborg		William N. Robson		Experiment in drama
January 16, 1938	Mr. Whipple is Worried				Bernard Herrmann	
January 22, 1938	Robert Owens				Bernard Herrmann	
January 29, 1938	Madame Curie	Eve Curie	William N. Robson	William N. Robson	Bernard Herrmann	
February 5, 1938	Andrea del Sarto	Anita Fairgrieve		Earle McGill	Bernard Herrmann	Author was NYU student
February 12, 1938	Be Prepared	Guy Della Cioppa & Richard Linkroum		George Zachary	Bernard Herrmann	Boy scouts & demo of audio montage
February 19, 1938	The Well of the Saints	John Millington Synge	George Zachary	George Zachary	Bernard Herrmann	Use of sound in delineating elements of supernatural fantasy
February 26, 1938	Night Patrol	Stuart Hawkins				
March 5, 1938	The Ghost of Benjamin Sweet, part 2	Pauline Gibson & Frederick Gilsdorff		Nila Mack	Bernard Herrmann	Use of microphone filters
March 12, 1938	Hassan	James Elroy Flecker	Constance Brown	Earle McGill	Frederick Delius (Bermard Herrmann, conductor)	opera
March 19, 1938	The Wedding of the Meteors	Leslie Roberts & Joel Hamill		William N. Robson	Bernard Herrmann	
March 26, 1938	J. Smith and Wife	Charles Tazewell		William N. Robson	Bernard Herrmann	No sound effects used
April 2, 1938	Seven Waves Away	Richard Sale	Margaret Lewerth	William N. Robson	Bernard Herrmann	
April 9, 1938	The Broken Feather	Michael Carroll		William N. Robson	Bernard Herrmann	
April 16, 1938	The Terrible Meek	Charles Rann Kennedy		William N. Robson		
April 23, 1938	Never Come Monday	Eric Knight	Stephen Fox	William N. Robson	Charles Paul	Repeated June 25, 1938
April 30, 1938	Fours into Seven Won't Go	Val Gielgud, Stephen King-Hall		Val Gielgud		
May 7, 1938	The Fisherman and His Soul	Oscar Wilde	[William N. Robson?]	William N. Robson		
May 14, 1938	Melodrams	various [poems read by David Ross]		William N. Robson	Bernard Herrmann	music composed 1934-35
May 21, 1938	Ecce Homo	Pare Lorenz		Pare Lorenz	Bernard Herrmann	
May 28, 1938	Bury the Dead	Irwin Shaw	William N. Robson	William N. Robson		
June 4, 1938	Tranga Man, Fine Gah	John S. Carlisle		John S. Carlisle & William N. Robson		
June 11, 1938	Surrealism	Ernest Walsh & George Whitsett		Davidson Taylor	Bernard Herrmann	Also music by Erik Satie & Virgil Thomson
June 18, 1938	Reunion	John Hines Jr. & Guy Della Cioppa		William N. Robson	Columbia Univ. Singers conducted by Lyn Murray	
June 25, 1938	Never Come Monday	Eric Knight	Stephen Fox	William N. Robson	Charles Paul & Bernard Herrmann	Repeat from April 23, 1938
July 2, 1938	The Constitution of the US			William N. Robson		
July 9, 1938	The Red Badge of Courage	Stephen Crane	Margaret Lewerth	Norman Corwin	Charles Paul	Corwin's debut on CBS
July 16, 1938	The National Headliners			William N. Robson		
July 23, 1938	Murder in the Cathedral	T. S. Eliot	George Zachary	George Zachary	Bernard Herrmann	
July 30, 1938	Tristam	Edwin Arlington Robinson	Stella Reynolds	William N. Robson	Wagner (Cond. BH)	
August 6, 1938	The Devil and Daniel Webster	Stephen Vincent Benét	Charles R. Jackson	Earle McGill	Bernard Herrmann	
August 13, 1938						
August 20, 1938						(unidentified show)
August 27, 1938	Pelleas et Melisande					
September 1, 1938						(unidentified show)
September 8, 1938						(unidentified show)
September 15, 1938	Outward Bound	Sutton Vane	Charles R. Jackson	Martin Gosch	Bernard Herrmann	
September 22, 1938	He Doubles in Pipes	Hilda Cole		William N. Robson		
September 29, 1938	The Lighthouse Keepers	Paul Cloquemin		Norman Corwin		
October 13, 1938	Brushwood Boy	Rudyard Kipling	Eustace Wyatt	Earle McGill	Bernard Herrmann	
October 20, 1938	The Happy Journey to Trenton and Camden	Thorton Wilder				
October 26, 1938	Air Raid (Rehearsal)	Archibald MacLeish		William N. Robson		
October 27, 1938	Air Raid	Archibald MacLeish		William N. Robson		
November 3, 1938	Poetic License	Norman Corwin		Norman Corwin		
November 10, 1938	A Drink of Water	Wilbur Daniel Steele	Max Wylie	Martin Gosch	Bernard Herrmann	
November 17, 1938	Luck	Wilbur Daniel Steele	Margaret Lewerth	Martin Gosch; Betsy Tuttle, producer.	Bernard Herrmann	
November 24, 1938	Beauty and the Beast		Robert A. Simon (libretto)		Vittorio Giannini (Howard Barlow, conductor)	opera
December 1, 1938	The Giant's Stair	Wilbur Daniel Steele	Charles R. Jackson	Earle McGill	Bernard Herrmann	
December 8, 1938	Man With a Gun/ Experiments in Music/ Fall of Jericho	Sound engineer: Al Span		Charles Vanda	Simeone, music director	3 pop songs in 2nd half of show
December 15, 1938	A Trip to Czardis	Edwin Granberry	James & Elizabeth Hart		Bernard Herrmann	
December 22, 1938	Bread on the Waters	Arch Oboler		Earle McGill	Alexander Courage	Sound: D. Gaines
December 29, 1938	Crosstown Manhattan	Travis Ingham, Norman Corwin		William N. Robson	Alfred Newman, Mark Warnow	
January 5, 1939	Orphan Ego	Arnold Manoff	Leslie Ubrach	William N. Robson	Bernard Herrmann	
January 9, 1939	Forgot in the Rains	William Merrick		Brewster Morgan	Bernard Herrmann	
January 16, 1939	Mr. Whipple is Worried	James Frederick		Brewster Morgan	Bernard Herrmann	
January 23, 1939	Prophecy				Bernard Herrmann	
January 30, 1939	Now Playing Tomorrow	Arthur Laurents		William N. Robson	Bernard Herrmann	
February 6, 1939	Do Not Open For 5000 Years	William N. Robson		William N. Robson		
February 20, 1939	Nine Prisoners	William March	Brian J. Byrne	Earle McGill	Bernard Herrmann	
February 27, 1939	Jury Trial	Elizabeth & James Hart		William N. Robson		
March 6, 1939	The Winged Victory	David Redstone		Brewster Morgan		
March 13, 1939	In the Train	Frank O’Connor	Hugh Hunt	Brewster Morgan	Bernard Herrmann	
March 20, 1939	A Letter from Home	Charles R. Jackson		Nila Mack	Bernard Herrmann	
March 27, 1939	Pepito Inherits the Earth					
April 3, 1939	Rendezvous with Kit Carson					correct date?
April 10, 1939	They Fly Through The Air With The Greatest of Ease	Norman Corwin		Norman Corwin		
April 17, 1939	Ear Essay On Broadcasting					
April 24, 1939	Seems Like Radio Is Here to Stay	Norman Corwin		Norman Corwin	Bernard Herrmann	
May 1, 1939	Wet Saturday	Lee Anderson play based on short story by John Collier	Margaret Lewerth	William N. Robson	Bernard Herrmann	
May 8, 1939	Wild Man					
May 15, 1939	Law Beaters					
May 22, 1939						
May 29, 1939	Private Throgg					
June 5, 1939	Highboy					
June 12, 1939	Handful of Dust					
June 19, 1939	Journalism in Tennessee	Mark Twain	Norman Corwin			
June 19, 1939	Salesmanship	Mary Ellen Chase	Norman Corwin			
July 6, 1939	The Half-Pint Flask	Dubose Heyward	Irving Reis	William N. Robson	[Victor Young?]	
July 13, 1939	Never Come Home					
July 20, 1939	John Brown's Body	Stephen Vincent Benét	Norman Corwin	Norman Corwin	Leith Stevens	One hour broadcast
July 27, 1939	A Trip to Czardis					
August 3, 1939	The Ghost of Benjamin Sweet					
August 10, 1939	Radio Play	William Saroyan				
August 17, 1939	A Drink of Water					
August 24, 1939	Meridian 7-1212	Irving Reis		Irving Reis		
August 31, 1939	Apartment to Let	Dorothy Parker; Alan Campbell		Brewster Morgan	George Lehman (composer); Bernard Herrmann (conductor)	
September 7, 1939	So This is Radio					
September 14, 1939	The Use of Man				Bernard Herrmann	
September 21, 1939	Now It's Summer	Arthur Kober		Earle McGill		
September 28, 1939	The Fall of the City	Archibald MacLeish		Irving Reis	[no music]	remake broadcast from California featuring Orson Welles and 500 University of Southern California students
October 12, 1939	Wake Up and Die	Frank Lovejoy				Story of alarm clocks
October 19, 1939	William Ireland's Confession	Arthur Miller				
November 2, 1939	Blennerhasset [Conductor: Howard Barlow]	Norman Corwin		Music direction Howard Barlow; production: George Zachary	opera music by Vittorio Giannini, libretto by Philip Roll	The opera deals with the fortunes of two Americans who become involved in the revolt of Aaron Burr, a famous Revolutionary conspirator, whose plot was mapped at the home Harman Blennerhassett on the Ohio River island named after him.
November 16, 1939	A Letter From Above	Florence & Ben Vine				
November 23, 1939	A Circular Tour	W. W. Jacobs				
November 27, 1939	The Half-Pint Flask	Dubose Heyward			Leith Stevens	Repeat from August 29, 1937
November 30, 1939	The Wonderful Day	Frank Gould		Earle McGill	Alexander Semmler	
December 7, 1939	As You Like It					
December 14, 1939	Story in the Dogtown Common	Joseph Liss			Alexander Semmler	
December 21, 1939	Mr. Cohen Takes a Walk					
December 28, 1939	Higher Than A Kite	Brewster Morgan		[Brewster Morgan?]		
January 11, 1940	My Heart Is In The Highlands					
January 18, 1940	Fannie Kemble	Joseph Liss and Louis Lantz				
January 25, 1940	Heavently Rest	Milton Wayne		Earle McGill		
February 1, 1940	Coals to Newscastle	from J. P. Marquand's “Timothy Dexter”	Charles Monroe	Brewster Morgan		
February 15, 1940	Double Exposure	Maurice Level, Étienne Rey			Alexander Semmler	Adaptation of Grand Guignol play
February 22, 1940	An Autobiography of an Egotist					
February 29, 1940	The Great Microphone Mystery; Ellery Queen Mystery: The Case of the Mysterious Leap Year					
February 29, 1940	Leaping Out of Character					From CBS Program book: “Announcers are to be singers; singers and directors turn actors; actors take a hand as musiciansî
March 7, 1940	My Client Curley	Lucille Fletcher	Norman Corwin		Raymond Scott	Repeated April 4, 1940
March 14, 1940	Three Original Playlets by KNX staff					Writing, acting, producinto and music has been placed in the hands of elevator operators, ushers, stenographers, tourist guides, receptionists, mail clerks and other employed in the non-glamorous jobs connected with radio.
March 21, 1940	The Taming of the Shrew	Shakespeare	Joseph Gottlieb and Irvin Graham	Phil Cohan		“specially written modernized-musical”; music & lyrics by Gottlieb & Graham
April 4, 1940	Sunset Boulevard	William N. Robson		William N. Robson		
April 18, 1940	Three Strikes, You're Out	Vernon Delston		Brewster Morgan		
April 25, 1940	America Was Promises	Archibald MacLeish		George Zachary	Nicholas Nabokov	
May 5, 1940	The Honest Captain	Knowles Entrikin, Howard Breslin		Earle McGill	Charles Paul (organ)	Workshop switched to Sundays
May 12, 1940	A Day in Manhattan	A. M. Sullivan		Earle McGill		
May 19, 1940	Carlos Chavez conducts a program of Mexican music			Carlos Chavez, various		
June 2, 1940	The Dark Valley	W. H. Auden		Brewster Morgan	Benjamin Britten	
June 9, 1940	No Complications					
June 16, 1940						pre-empted
June 23, 1940	In April Once					
June 30, 1940	The Man With the One Track Mind		Lucille Fletcher			
July 7, 1940	The Cock-Eyed Wonder					About baseball
July 14, 1940	The Fish Story	Joseph Gottlieb & Irvin Graham		Phil Cohan		musical
July 21, 1940	Canvas Kisser					
July 28, 1940	Carmilla	Sheridan Le Fanu	Lucille Fletcher	Earle McGill		
August 18, 1940	The 500 Hats of Bartholomew Cubbins	E. B. White-Dr. Seuss	Nila Mack & Stuart†Aynes	Nila Mack	Charles Paul	
August 25, 1940	I Followed The Seals					
September 1, 1940	Alf, The All-American Fly	Lucille Fletcher		Earle McGill	Bernard Herrmann	
September 8, 1940	The Major Goes Over The Hill					
September 15, 1940	Mr. Charles					
September 22, 1940	Well Look Who's Here					
September 29, 1940	The Pussy Cat And The Expert Plumber Who Was A Man	Arthur Miller		Brewster Mogran	Charles Paul	
October 6, 1940	They Also Serve					
October 27, 1940	Fulton Fish Market					
November 3, 1940	The Constitution					
November 10, 1940	Bela and Dita Bartók				Béla Bartók	
November 17, 1940	I Get The Blues From Revues					
November 24, 1940	The Dynasts	Thomas Hardy	W.H. Auden?		Benjamin Britten	
December 1, 1940	And to Think That I Saw It on Mulberry Street	Dr. Seuss		Nila Mack production		
December 8, 1940	The Trojan Women	Euripides	Edith Hamilton, translator		Virgil Thomson	
December 15, 1940	The Symptoms of being 35; In The Fog					
December 22, 1940	The Plot to Overthrow Christmas	Norman Corwin		Norman Corwin		Repeat of Corwin's original Dec. 25, 1938 performance
December 29, 1940	Dr. Johnson in Scotland					
January 5, 1941	Love In 32 bars					
January 12, 1941	Cassidy and the Devil					
January 26, 1941	This Is From David	Meridel Le Sueur	Draper Lewis, Jack Fink	Clinton Johnston	Alexander Semmler	
February 2, 1941	Help Me Hannah					
February 9, 1941	Dress Rehearsal					
February 16, 1941	A Crop of Beans	Marjorie Kinnan Rawlings	Draper Lewis	Guy della Cioppa		
February 23, 1941	Wings of an Eagle					
March 2, 1941	Roadside	Lynn Riggs	Alan M. Fishburn	Earle McGill	Burl Ives	
March 9, 1941	Still Small Voice					
March 16, 1941	Cassidy and the Devil					
March 23, 1941	Out of the Air					
March 30, 1941	The Creation; The Congo	Vachel Lindsay's "The Congo" poem; "The Creation" was a dramatization of a paraphrase of James Weldon Johnson's book of "Negro poems and verse" "God's Trombones"		George Zachary		Had been scheduled for an earlier broadcast, but which were postponed until March 30.
April 6, 1941	The Rocking-Horse Winner	DH Lawrence ad. Auden & James Stern		Guy della Cioppa	Benjamin Britten	
April 13, 1941	Glory Machine/The House/Brooklyn Cantata					
April 20, 1941	The Reluctant Dragon			Nila Mack		
April 27, 1941	Jason Was A Man					
May 4, 1941	26 by Corwin: Radio Primer	Norman Corwin			Lyn Murray	
May 11, 1941	26 by Corwin: Log of the R-77	Norman Corwin			Lyn Murray	
May 18, 1941	26 by Corwin: The People, Yes	Norman Corwin			Earl Robinson	
May 25, 1941	26 by Corwin: Lip Service	Norman Corwin			Larry Adler	
June 1, 1941	26 by Corwin: Appointment	Norman Corwin			Lyn Murray	
June 8, 1941	26 by Corwin: The Odyssey of Runyon Jones	Norman Corwin			Alexander Semmler	
June 15, 1941	26 by Corwin: A Soliloquy to Balance the Budget	Norman Corwin				
June 22, 1941	26 by Corwin: Daybreak	Norman Corwin			Lyn Murray	
June 29, 1941	26 by Corwin: Old Salt	Norman Corwin			Lyn Murray	
July 6, 1941	26 by Corwin: Between Americans	Norman Corwin			Alexander Semmler	
July 13, 1941	26 by Corwin: Ann Rutledge	Norman Corwin		Norman Corwin	Alexander Semmler	Ann Was An Ordinary Girl
July 20, 1941	26 by Corwin: Double Concerto	Norman Corwin			Paul Berlanger	
August 3, 1941	26 by Corwin: Descent of the Gods	Norman Corwin				
August 10, 1941	26 by Corwin: Samson	Norman Corwin			Bernard Herrmann	
August 17, 1941	26 by Corwin: Esther	Norman Corwin			Lyn Murray	
August 24, 1941	26 by Corwin: Job	Norman Corwin			Deems Taylor	
August 31, 1941	26 by Corwin: Mary and the Fairy	Norman Corwin			Lud Gluskin	
September 7, 1941	26 by Corwin: Anatomy of Sound	Norman Corwin			[no music]	
September 14, 1941	26 by Corwin: Fragments from a Lost Cause	Norman Corwin			Alexander Semmler	
September 21, 1941	26 by Corwin: The Human Angle	Dore Schary	Norman Corwin	Norman Corwin		
September 28, 1941	26 by Corwin: Good Heavens	Norman Corwin			Lyn Murray	
October 5, 1941	26 by Corwin: Wolfiana	Thomas Wolfe	Norman Corwin	Norman Corwin	Alexander Semmler	
October 12, 1941	26 by Corwin: Murder in Studio One	Norman Corwin			Alexander Semmler	
October 19, 1941	26 by Corwin: Descent of the Gods	Norman Corwin		Perry Lafferty	[no original music]	repeat due to Corwin illness
October 26, 1941	26 by Corwin: Odyssey of Runyan Jones	Norman Corwin				repeat performance
November 2, 1941	26 by Corwin: A Man with a Platform	Norman Corwin			Lyn Murrary	
November 9, 1941	26 by Corwin: Psalm for a Dark Year	Norman Corwin			Alexander Semmler	
November 16, 1941	Gator Boy					
November 23, 1941	The Life of a Careful Man				Virgil Thomson	
November 30, 1941	Double Ugly					
December 14, 1941	Citizen For Tomorrow					150th anniversary of Bill of Rights
December 21, 1941	Miracle In Manhattan					Duffy's Tavern
December 28, 1941	Who Wants To Be Born These Days?					New Years show – baby organization
January 4, 1942	The Fish on the Bathroom Floor					
January 11, 1942	Free Speech					
January 18, 1942	At The Sign Of The Lark					“rare books”
January 25, 1942	The Man Without A Shadow	Werner Mishel		Charles Vanda	Alexander Semmler	Lurene Tuttle plays all 7 female parts
February 1, 1942	Jenny, The Bus Nobody Loved			Perry Lafferty		Bus rebellion
February 8, 1942	Portrait of Jennie	Robert Nathan	George D. Griffin	Earle McGill	Lehman Engel	Santos Ortega
February 15, 1942	Opus For A Lute And A Liar		Nila Mack	Nila Mack		
February 22, 1942	Plot for Mr. Greenberg					
March 1, 1942	When the Bough Breaks					
March 8, 1942	The Test	Joseph Ruscoll				
March 15, 1942	A Child's History of Hot Music	William H. Brown Jr.			William H. Brown Jr.	
March 22, 1942	Green Receipt					
March 29, 1942	Solomon and Balkis				Bernard Rogers	opera
April 5, 1942	Miracle of the Danube					
April 12, 1942	He Should Have Stood In Elba				Nathan Van Cleave	Ted de Corsia
April 19, 1942	Play Ball	Louis Hazam				
May 3, 1942	Looking For Susie					
May 10, 1942	Flight To Arras					
May 17, 1942	Good Morning Mr. Crumb					
May 24, 1942	Midnight Blue	James Caleb Beach		Perry Lafferty	Nathan Van Cleave	About blues
May 31, 1942	The City Wears a Slouch Hat	Kenneth Patchen		Les Mitchel	John Cage	
June 7, 1942	The Little One					
June 12, 1942	Ritchie The Great	Jerome Lawrence, Robert E. Lee		John Dietz		James Monks, Joan Allison
June 19, 1942	It Couldn't Happen To A Nicer Kid					
June 26, 1942	History Is On The March/1812					
July 3, 1942	Tag number 1-184-463					Skip Homier
July 6, 1942	Broadcast from the Year 1812					
July 13, 1942	Let Me Tell You About My Operation					
July 20, 1942	Someone Else	Lucille Fletcher		Earle McGill	Bernard Herrmann	Arr. of music by André Campra
July 27, 1942	Reveille Pass					
August 3, 1942	Laughter For The Leader					
August 10, 1942	Music Of The Mountains					
August 17, 1942	All Out For Comedy					
August 24, 1942	Hold ‘Em Yale					
August 31, 1942	All Out For Comedy – Columbia Sketchbook					
September 7, 1942	Café Society – Stars					
September 14, 1942	Portrait of Jennie	Robert Nathan				
September 21, 1942	My Kid Brother					
September 28, 1942	Florrie And The Country Green	Abraham Polonsky		Marx Loeb	Ben Ludlow	
October 12, 1942	Rebirth of Barrow’s Inlet					
October 19, 1942	Remodeled Brownstone	Lucille Fletcher		John Dietz		Martin Gabel
November 8, 1942	Proclaim the Morning					
July 25, 1944	El Capitan and the Corporal					
March 23, 1946	Act of Faith	Irwin Shaw	Charles S. Monroe	John Dietz	Alexander Semmler	
April 13, 1946	Joe Peabody's Dream			Betty Todd	Charles Paul	
April 21, 1946	The Playroom	Howard Rodman		John Dietz	Norman Lockwood, conducted by Fred Steiner	
April 28, 1946	A Study in Bells	Bogart Carlaw	-	Albert Ward	Norman Lockwood, conducted by Fred Steiner	
April 28, 1946	The House	André Maurois	-	Albert Ward	Norman Lockwood, conducted by Fred Steiner	
May 19, 1946	The Trial	Franz Kafka	Davidson Taylor	Guy della Cioppa	Bernard Herrmann	
August 25, 1946	The Path and the Door	Les Crutchfield (first radio script)		William N. Robson	George Antheil (first radio score) conducted by Cy Feuer	
September 15, 1946	The Last Delegate	Margaret Lewerth		John Dietz	Robert Stringer	
September 21, 1946	The Midnight Town Is Full of Boys	Fletcher Markle		Albert Ward	Fred Steiner	
October 5, 1946	Studies in Jealousy			Irving Hopkins	Alexander Semmler	
October 12, 1946	Brewsie and Willie	Gertrude Stein		Richard Sanville	Robert Stringer	
November 2, 1946	Lee Fountain Comes of Age	Joseph Ruscoll		Werner Mishel	Alexander Semmler	
November 23, 1946	The Tin Whistle	Richard Burdick		Carl Beyer	Everett Helm	
November 30, 1946	It Shouldn't Happen to a Man	Madelyn Pugh		William N. Robson	Maurice Carlton, conducted by Wilbur Hatch	
December 7, 1946	The Parade	Morris Markey	Margaret Lewerth	Richard Sanville	Robert Stringer	
December 14, 1946	Alice and the Echo	Jean L. Meyer		John Becker	Alexander Semmler	
January 11, 1947	The Surreal Marriage	Elwood Hoffman		Werner Mishel	Alexander Semmler	
January 25, 1947	The Natural History of Nonsense	Bergen Evans	Joseph Ruscoll	Albert Ward	Ben Ludlow	

== Sources ==
- Bannerman, R. LeRoy (1986). Norman Corwin and Radio: The Golden Years. University, AL: University of Alabama Press. ISBN 978-0-8173-0274-0.
- Barnouw, Erik (1968). A History of Broadcasting in the United States. Vol. 2, The Golden Web: 1933 to 1953. New York: Oxford University Press. ISBN 978-0-19-500475-5.
- Coulter, Douglas, ed. (1939). Columbia Workshop Plays: Fourteen Radio Dramas. New York: Whittlesey House, McGraw-Hill Book Company.
- Kosovsky, Robert (2000). Bernard Herrmann's Radio Music for the Columbia Workshop (PhD). Graduate Center, City University of New York.
- McGill, Earle (1940). Radio Directing. New York: McGraw-Hill Co.
- Wylie, Max (1939). Radio Writing. New York: Farr and Rinehart.

== Listen to ==
- Columbia Workshop in the Internet Archive's Old-Time Radio Collection
- Columbia Workshop: "Meridian 7-1212" (rebroadcast of August 24, 1939)
