= Murder at Midnight =

Murder at Midnight may refer to:

- Murder at Midnight (radio series), an old-time radio show that aired on WJZ
- Murder at Midnight (1931 film), an American film directed by Frank R. Strayer
- Murder at Midnight (1994 film), featuring Stephanie E. Williams
- Vampire at Midnight a.k.a. Murder at Midnight, a 1988 American film featuring Celia Kaye
