= Ek Hasina Thi =

Ek Hasina Thi (lit. 'there was a beautiful woman' in Hindi) may refer to:

- "Ek Hasina Thi" (song), a Hindi song from the 1980 Indian film Karz
- Ek Hasina Thi (film), a 2004 Indian noir film
- Ek Hasina Thi (TV series), a 2014 Indian television series
