= Transmigration =

Transmigration may refer to:

- Transmigration of the soul, a religious philosophical concept
- Transmigration program, the program to move landless people from densely populated areas of Indonesia to less populous areas of the country
- Transmigration (novel), a 1970 novel by J. T. McIntosh
- Transmigration, a 1993 album by Crematory
- Transmigration, a 1994 album by Osamu Sato
- Transmigration, a 2006 album by Bakithi Kumalo
- Transmigration, a 2009 album by Robert Spano and the Atlanta Symphony Orchestra, winner of a Grammy Award for Best Surround Sound Album

== See also ==
- Leukocyte transmigration, the process of immune cells exiting from blood vessels to tissue
- Transmigration of cancer cells, a process that is involved in metastasis and secondary tumor formation
