= Transmigration (novel) =

1970 science fiction book by J. T. McIntosh

- First edition (publ. Avon Books); Cover artist: Ron Walotsky
- Author: J. T. McIntosh
- Language: English
- Publisher: Avon Books
- Publication date: 1970

Transmigration is a science fiction book by Scottish writer J. T. McIntosh, published in 1970 by Avon Books.

== Plot summary ==
John Fletcher, the hero, discovers he is both cursed with bad luck and blessed with a miraculous power - the power to occupy other people's minds - provided he dies first. A series of freak accidents bring him closer and closer to death, until at last he does die - but miraculously transmigrates into the nearest body around. His power to occupy minds is involuntary, and when it happens, he overwhelms those he invades, though he is able to communicate with them. Unwilling to depart from the bodies he occupies, he learns that the only way out of the body he is possessing is by dying, presenting him with an unusual ethical conflict.

== See also ==
- Anima (1972) by Marie Buchanan
- Reincarnation in Venice by Max Ehrlich
- The Reincarnation of Peter Proud by Max Ehrlich
- Astral Projection
- Out-of-body experience
- List of science fiction novels
