= The Fall of the City =

First American verse play written for radio

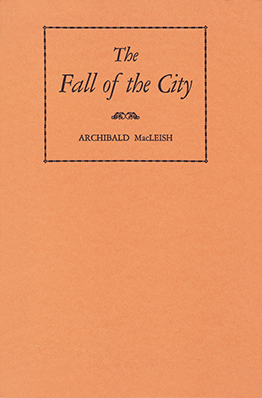
- First edition 1937
- Genre: Radio drama
- Running time: 30 minutes
- Home station: CBS Radio
- Hosted by: Columbia Workshop
- Starring: Orson Welles; Burgess Meredith
- Written by: Archibald MacLeish
- Directed by: Irving Reis
- Produced by: Irving Reis
- Recording studio: Seventh Regiment Armory, New York
- Original release: April 11, 1937

The Fall of the City by Archibald MacLeish is the first American verse play written for radio. The 30-minute radio play was first broadcast April 11, 1937, at 7 p.m. ET over the Columbia Broadcasting System (today CBS) as part of the Columbia Workshop radio series. The cast featured Orson Welles and Burgess Meredith. Music was composed and directed by Bernard Herrmann. It is an allegory on the rise of Fascism.

== The play ==
=== Background ===
MacLeish submitted the play in response to a general invitation by the producers of the Columbia Workshop for the submission of experimental works.

MacLeish acknowledged he was inspired by the Anschluss, the annexation of Austria by Adolf Hitler and the National Socialist German Workers Party. According to MacLeish, the setting of the play was inspired by the Aztec city of Tenochtitlan, which he had visited in 1929, and in particular the conquest of the city without resistance by Hernán Cortés in 1521, as described by contemporary conquistador Bernal Díaz del Castillo. He also used as inspiration an Aztec myth that told of a woman who had returned from the dead to predict the fall of Tenochtitlan just before its conquest.

=== Synopsis ===
The city of masterless men
will take a master.
There will be shouting then:
Blood after!

The play takes the form of a radio broadcast from a plaza in an unnamed city. An Announcer reports as a crowd awaits the reappearance of a "recently dead" woman who has risen from her crypt on the previous three nights. On her appearance, the woman prophesizes that "the city of masterless men will take a master". As the panicking crowd consider the meaning of the prophecy, a Messenger arrives warning of the impending arrival of a conqueror. The Messenger describes the life of those who have been conquered as one of terror – "Their words are their murderers – Judged before judgment", even as many of them actively invite the oppressor in.

A pacifist Orator then addresses the crowd, urging a non-violent acceptance of the conqueror's arrival, arguing that reason and appeasement and eventual scorn will ultimately prevail against the conqueror.

The momentary calming of the crowd achieved by the Orator is interrupted by the arrival of a Second Messenger, who reports that the newly conquered peoples have embraced the conqueror. The Priests of the city then exhort the people to turn to religion – "Turn to your gods" – and almost instigate the sacrifice of one of the citizens, before a General of the city interrupts them. The General calls for resistance but the people have already given up hope and renounced their freedom echoing the prophecy "Masterless men must take a master!" as the armour-clad Conqueror enters the city. As the people cower and cover their faces, the Conqueror ascends the podium and opens his visor, with only the Radio Announcer seeing that the visor and armour are empty, observes "People invent their oppressors." But by then. the people are now acclaiming their new master. The Announcer concludes: "The city has fallen ..."

== First broadcast ==
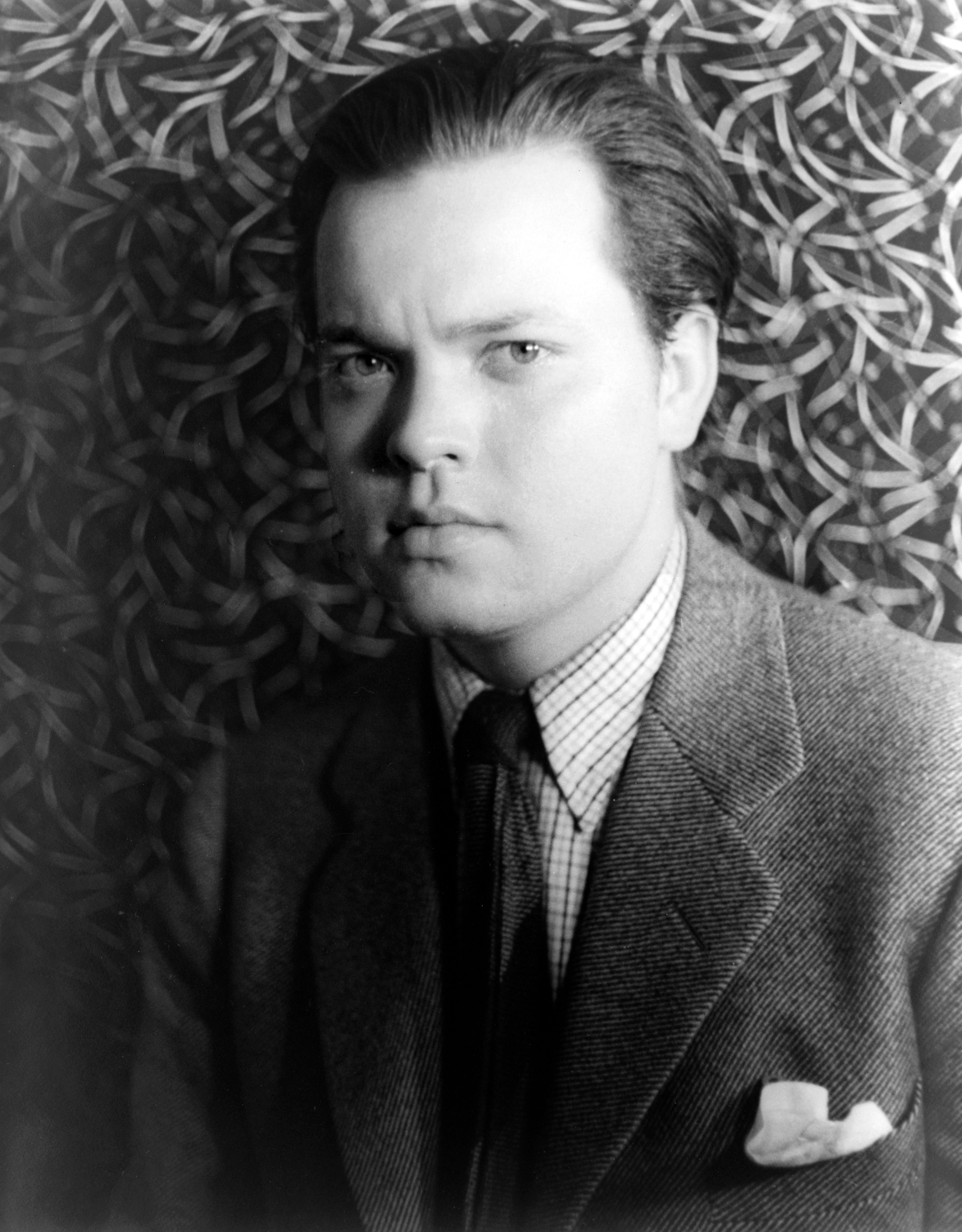
Orson Welles, March 1, 1937 (Carl Van Vechten)

We had a CBS experimental theater of the air called the Columbia Workshop, which pioneered all kinds of special sound effects and other dramatic techniques. In 1937 it put on a poetic drama by Archibald MacLeish called The Fall of the City, featuring a 22-year-old actor with an unforgettably expressive voice. The play was a sensation, which helped point the way to what radio could achieve. It also made the actor, Orson Welles, an overnight star.

— William S. Paley

=== Cast of characters ===
The cast of the Columbia Workshop broadcast premiere is listed as it appears in The Fall of the City, the text of the play published April 26, 1937, by Farrar & Rinehart.

- House Jameson as Studio Director
- Orson Welles as Announcer
- Adelaide Klein as Dead Woman
- Carleton Young as 1st Messenger
- Burgess Meredith as Orator
- Dwight Weist as 2nd Messenger
- Edgar Stehli as Priest
- William Pringle as General
- Guy Repp, Brandon Peters, Karl Swenson, Dan Davies, and Kenneth Delmar as Antiphonal Chorus
- Citizens, dancers, priests, soldiers, etc.

=== Production ===
Rehearsal for the first broadcast of The Fall of the City, apparently in a gym (note the basketball hoop on the rear wall). The 200+ extras would not have fit into a regular radio studio. In the foreground, a staff member prepares cards cueing the extras to provide sound effects, i.e. "whispers."

The play was broadcast live from the drill hall of the Seventh Regiment Armory in Manhattan, New York. The site was chosen for the acoustic properties needed for the production. The principal director was Irving Reis who was also the producer. Music was composed and directed by Bernard Herrmann, music director of the Columbia Workshop. William N. Robson was responsible for crowd supervision; Brewster Morgan was editorial supervisor; and the stage manager was Earle McGill.

The production involved the construction of a soundproof isolation booth for Welles. Two hundred extras were used for the crowds, drawn from New York University students, New Jersey high school students and boys clubs.

To simulate a crowd of 10,000, Reis recorded the sounds of the extras during rehearsals, including their shouts. During the actual performance, these recordings were played at four different locations in the Armory; the recordings were played at slightly different speeds to give the effect of a larger crowd.

The first broadcast of The Fall of the City from inside the Seventh Regiment Armory, April 11, 1937

The photograph shown here was apparently taken during a dress rehearsal in the Seventh Regiment Armory, and reveals much about the original broadcast and reveals something about radio techniques in 1937. Though it may look under-illuminated, the dark hue is caused by lighting insufficient for taking a photograph in the Armory's vast drill hall. It must be a dress rehearsal because the broadcast took place at 7 pm, at which time the sky would not have been as bright as the skylights indicate.

To the far right and close to the foreground is the CBS broadcasting booth, with "Columbia Broadcasting System" emblazoned on it. The two men crouching behind it are probably technicians checking connections. To the left of the broadcasting booth is a woman sitting on the floor, while a man and woman are seated in two of the five chairs in the foreground (the woman on the floor and the technicians behind the booth would have occupied the three empty seats). These five individuals are probably technical staff of CBS.

The broadcasting booth obscures what appears to be two sources of light, one emanating from the booth, and another from additional equipment barely visible on the far right in the middleground.

All the remaining individuals are participants in the broadcast. Towards the background right (but to the left of the CBS broadcast booth) are the 200 students and boys supplying the crowd noises. A hidden floor lamp is shining on a group of men and women holding scripts, who are probably the "voices of citizens" who speak antiphonally near the end of the play. Closer to the middleground are two microphone stands. At the one on the right is a man facing the crowd, dressed in a white shirt and suspenders; this is probably director Irving Reis. At the stand on the left is an actor in a suit reading from a script; this is possibly Burgess Meredith as the Orator, or the actor that plays the Messenger.

To the left of this actor is the booth, inside of which Orson Welles was portraying the Announcer. Over this booth appears a head, but as this head is much smaller than the actor standing in front of the microphone, the head is probably that of a person standing in the background with the crowd (this could be either the Orator or the Messenger).

To the left of the booth, there is a screen in front of which sit actors in chairs; the one directly in front of the screen is bent over, studiously following his script, while others are slightly to the left of him.

Behind these actors stands Bernard Herrmann on a podium (there is a person behind him, i.e. to our right). Herrmann's body faces the small orchestra. Only three percussionists are visible; they are standing at the back of the orchestra, the left-most human figures. There appear to be three timpani in front of them. The woodwind and brass players are not entirely visible. Herrmann's body is facing the orchestra, and his hands are raised as if prompting a cue. However, his head and face are turned toward the actor at the microphone.

Herrmann's pose is a key source that suggests three possible moments at which the picture was taken:

1. Slightly before the first music cue (in the play: "Even a few old men are dancing")
2. At the conclusion of the first music cue (in the play: "That's odd! The music has stopped")
3. Just before the second and final music cue (in the play: "The city has fallen")

The third option can be discarded since there would be no need for so many actors to be holding scripts if the play was seconds from being over. If Herrmann was waiting for the cue to end, his right arm would be in motion and blurred. So it can be presumed that this photograph was taken during the Announcer's speech, shortly before the first music cue.

== Reception ==
The Columbia Workshop premiere of The Fall of the City was selected by The New York Times as one of the outstanding broadcasts of 1937.

In reviewing the play in print (it was published shortly after the broadcast), critic and poet Louis Untermeyer wrote:

An examination of the printed work confirms the first impression. Here are all the technical excellences: the alternating shifts in accent; the adroit juxtaposition of oratory and plain speech; the variations of rhyme, assonance, and dissonance; above all, the atmosphere of suspense which this poet can communicate so well. The play is one mounting tension, thrilling in its evocation of terror and fatality. The reader is convinced that these are events, not images, that "the people invent their oppressors," and that, with the fall of the city, "the long labor of liberty" is ended.

In describing the idiomatic use of radio, Untermeyer continued:

The effectiveness of this verse play is increased by Mr. MacLeish's recognition of the resources of the radio and his employment of the Announcer as a combination of Greek Chorus and casual commentator. Writing for the radio, he has indicated a new power for poetry in the use of the word in action, without props or settings, the allusively spoken word and the "word-excited imagination."

Orrin E. Dunlap Jr. of the New York Times lamented the fast pace of the actors dealing with weighty words. But an unsigned review in TIME magazine noted: "Aside from the beauty of its speech and the power of its story, The Fall of the City proved to most listeners that the radio, which conveys only sound, is science's gift to poetry and poetic drama, that 30 minutes is an ideal time for a verse play, that artistically radio is ready to come of age, for in the hands of a master a $10 receiving set can become a living theatre, its loudspeaker a national proscenium."

Aaron Stein, writing for the New York Post, criticized the clash between typical radio fare and serious drama:

... we are bothered by the feeling that a less mystically taciturn script might have offered easier going to an audience that has been pretty thoroughly conditioned away from listening with anything like concentration. We are not sure that the drama held the attention of its audience. If in that respect it failed, the failure is not the fault of the drama or of the audience but of the background of broadcasting which created in the listener a habit of only casual attention...Mr. MacLeish's theme was presented in terms that were more thoughtful than dramatic. His bitter tale of human unwillingness to sustain the burden of freedom could to advantage have been more concretely particularized, but we are more concerned with his use of the microphone than with the purely literary aspects of his work. The drama is frankly written as a radio job, utilizing firmly established radio forms for the presentation of its narrative.

Despite his feeling of incongruity, Stein concluded: "... it is a distinguished step in the direction of the creation of a real theatre of the air; because one hearing indicated that it is richer in meaning than a radio ear is likely to apprehend immediately, and because to date the library of radio drama has nothing as good to put on the air."

Reception of The Fall of the City was positive enough that CBS commissioned MacLeish to follow up with another play, Air Raid. CBS took the unusual step of broadcasting both the dress rehearsal on October 26, 1938, and the finished production on October 27, 1938.

== Later versions and adaptations ==
The first staged production took place in June 1938, when students at Smith College under the direction of Edith Burnett, adapted the play for dance as part of the school's commencement program. Oliver Waterman Larkin designed the sets.

The play was presented again in the Columbia Workshop series on September 28, 1939, again featuring Orson Welles but broadcast from the Hollywood Bowl (though without any musical accompaniment), where the crowds were portrayed by students from the University of California, Los Angeles.

A CBS television version was aired in 1962, as part of the ACCENT series, starring John Ireland, Colleen Dewhurst, Ossie Davis and Tim O'Connor. The production was produced by Don Kellerman and directed by John J. Desmond. Jack Iams, TV critic of the New York Herald Tribune, observed "It is equally applicable today to the threat of world communism. It will always be applicable as long as mankind cherishes and protects the concept of liberty."

The play was made into an opera composed by James Cohn. It had its premiere at the Peabody Institute on March 1, 1962, conducted by Laszlo Halasz.

In 2009, the radio station WNYC aired a new version featuring a musical score by Wendy & Lisa. It was preceded by a documentary on the original broadcast which featured interviews with the film critic Leonard Maltin and the director Peter Bogdanovich. The production won a Gracie Award for the director.

== Accolades ==
The original broadcast of The Fall of the City was added to the National Recording Registry in 2005.

== Analysis ==
Director Irving Reis made much of radio's first verse play. "Hitherto, radio has been presenting drama that was frankly and avowedly adapted from stage writing. The men who are now becoming interested in radio writing, however, realize that there is small relationship between the stage and air and that a new form must be evolved...I believe that this production will definitely mark a turning point in the development of a new art form. Future historians of radio will see it as a most significant occasion."

MacLeish described the theme of The Fall of the City as "the proneness of men to accept their own conqueror, accept the loss of their rights because it will in some way solve their problems or simplify their lives—that theme had also been projected in terms of [the expected Anschluss of] Austria."

The experimental aspect of The Fall of the City was "the use of the natural paraphernalia of the ordinary broadcast, that is to say, an announcer in the studio and a reporter in the field...a very successful device it turned out to be. It gives you a Greek chorus without the rather ridiculous self-consciousness involved in carting a chorus in and standing them against the wall and having them recite. These people have a function; they are recognized by large audiences of nonliterary people as being proper participants."

When asked about the significance of the conqueror, MacLeish replied: "The conqueror is not the central figure. It's the people, crowding around and approaching him...It's a play about the way people lose their freedom. It's not a play about the Fascist master."

In later years, MacLeish recalled the first staged production at Smith College. "I realized at the time how much The Fall of the City owed to not being seen, how much it owed to the fact that the imagination conceives it, because these choral figures kept getting terribly in the way of what I had seen in my own mind...I didn't like the Smith production very much. There were several stage productions that I saw, but I didn't like any of them."
