= The Reincarnation of Peter Proud =

1975 American psychological horror film by J. Lee Thompson

- Theatrical release poster
- Directed by: J. Lee Thompson
- Screenplay by: Max Ehrlich
- Based on: The Reincarnation of Peter Proud (1973 novel) by Max Ehrlich
- Produced by: Frank P. Rosenberg
- Starring: Michael Sarrazin; Margot Kidder; Jennifer O'Neill; Paul Hecht; Cornelia Sharpe
- Cinematography: Victor J. Kemper
- Music by: Jerry Goldsmith
- Production companies: Cinerama Productions Corporation; Bing Crosby Productions; Fuqua Industries
- Distributed by: American International Pictures
- Release date: April 25, 1975
- Running time: 105 minutes
- Country: United States
- Language: English
- Box office: $5 million

The Reincarnation of Peter Proud is a 1975 American psychological horror film directed by J. Lee Thompson, and starring Michael Sarrazin, Margot Kidder, and Jennifer O'Neill. Adapted by Max Ehrlich from his own 1973 novel, the film follows a university professor (Sarrazin) who, after experiencing a series of bizarre nightmares, comes to believe he is the reincarnation of someone else.

This was the final film production from Cinerama Releasing Corporation, and was released by American International Pictures on April 25, 1975. It received mixed reviews.

== Plot ==
Peter Proud, a college professor in Los Angeles, begins having recurring dreams he cannot explain. In one particular nightmare, Peter witnesses the murder of a young man by a woman while he swims naked in a lake near a hotel. As he screams his final words, "Marcia, don't!", she bludgeons him with an oar, and he drowns. In subsequent dreams, Peter witnesses brief vignettes from the man's life, including romances with two different women, and has visions of houses and landmarks that are unknown to him.

Peter is haunted by his dreams and seeks medical treatment. He attends a sleep laboratory to try to decipher his dreams. However, the resident doctor, Sam Goodman, informs him that his dreams do not register as being dreams; in fact, they do not register at all. One evening while watching television, several of Peter's visions play out before him on a local documentary film titled The Changing Face of America. He sees an arch and church in the documentary that have figured prominently in his dreams. Peter starts to think that his dreams are scenes from a previous life; he calls the television station to discover the location. Upon learning that the location of his "visions" is in Massachusetts, Proud and his girlfriend Nora travel there.

In Massachusetts, the couple drive from town to town, but are unsuccessful until they arrive in Springfield. It is here that Proud begins to see familiar sights from his visions, such as a bridge, a church, the Puritan statue, and others. Nora decides to return to California, tired of Peter's relentless searching, which she dismisses as delusion. After Nora leaves, Peter continues his exploration. Eventually, Peter locates Marcia, the mystery woman from his nightmares, now a middle-aged alcoholic. Peter subsequently befriends Marcia's daughter Ann at a local country club where Marcia's husband Jeff was once a tennis pro; Ann has recently returned home to care for her emotionally unstable mother. Through his research, Peter uncovers that Jeff was found drowned in Crystal Lake in 1946 under mysterious circumstances.

Marcia is suspicious of Peter and curious about his motives, specifically how much he seems to know about her life. Ann and Peter quickly develop a romance, much to the disapproval of Marcia, who responds by increasingly drinking and taking prescription drugs. Peter initially has some hesitation toward pursuing a relationship with Ann after considering that she may have been his daughter in a past life, but he ultimately chooses to continue the romance. Ann brings Peter to a place where her father proposed to her mother, before they have sex.

One afternoon, Marcia accompanies Peter and Ann to the country club, where they lounge at the poolside. While Ann goes for a swim, Marcia witnesses a sleeping Peter repeating the phrase "Marcia, don't!" in Jeff's voice. This horrifies her, and she flees home where she locks herself in her bedroom. Later, she masturbates to the memory of Jeff raping her after she confronted him about an affair he had while she was pregnant with Ann. The following day, Marcia confronts Peter, demanding to know his true identity. The two get into a heated argument, during which he confirms that he is her deceased husband reincarnated.

Meanwhile, Peter realizes that by having re-enacted or visited the sites of his visions, they seem to have ceased haunting him. The lake vision of Jeff's murder is his last to be expunged. Drawn to the lake where Jeff died years prior, Peter enters the water, hoping to unfetter himself from the vision. While in the water, Marcia approaches him in the same boat she did Jeff years ago, now brandishing a pistol. Addressing Peter as Jeff, Marcia asks why he has returned to torment her, and accuses him of incest with Ann. When Peter tries to climb into the boat, Marcia shoots him to death. She watches as his body sinks to the bottom of the lake.

== Cast ==
- Michael Sarrazin as Dr. Peter Proud
- Margot Kidder as Marcia Curtis
- Jennifer O'Neill as Ann Curtis
- Cornelia Sharpe as Nora Hayes
- Paul Hecht as Dr. Sam Goodman
- Albert Henderson as Police Sergeant
- Tony Stephano as Jeff Curtis
  - Kevin Tobias as young Jeff
- Anne Ives as Ellen Curtis
- Debralee Scott as Suzy
- Steve Franken as Dr. Charles Crennis
- Fred Stuthman as Pop Johnson

== Production ==
Film rights to the novel were sold to Bing Crosby Productions before the novel had been published. By April 1974, Michael Sarrazin, Margot Kidder and Jennifer O'Neill were cast to star, and J. Lee Thompson was attached to direct. The novel came out in October – the Los Angeles Times called it "riveting".

Principal photography began on 24 April of the same year in Los Angeles and New England. Shooting locations included UCLA, Springfield, Massachusetts; Bradley International Airport near Hartford, Connecticut; and the Five College Consortium.

== Release ==
The Reincarnation of Peter Proud premiered in New York City on April 25, 1975, and subsequently opened in Los Angeles on May 2.

=== Critical response ===
The Reincarnation of Peter Proud received a mixed response from critics upon its release. Steven H. Scheuer labelled the film as a "clunky yarn". Mick Martin and Marsha Porter in their DVD Movie and Video Guide awarded the film their "turkey" rating and criticized it for its "turgid direction" and "contrived plot". Leslie Halliwell also panned the film as a "hysterical psychic melodrama which pretty well ruins its own chances by failing to explain its plot". The Philadelphia Inquirer's Desmond Ryan dismissed the film as "an obtuse essay into the much trampled world of the occult, and it is aptly named since it seems to take several lifetimes to trudge through the film from its modest beginnings to its silly conclusion."

Some critics were more generous. Leonard Maltin wrote that the film was "moderately gripping". The New York Times critic A.H. Weiler, like Halliwell, was unconvinced by the film's plot, but lauded it for its "polished [filmic] treatment" and Thompson's "properly moody [directorial] style".

In a retrospective review, Michael Barrett of PopMatters praised the film's cinematography and editing, which he notes provides "a sense of propulsion to what, in other hands, might be a stagnantly paced story; either sound or image are continually pulling at us, like fate... There's something about The Reincarnation of Peter Proud that keeps it lodged in the memory like a nasty splinter."

=== Home media ===
In 2018, Kino Lorber released The Reincarnation of Peter Proud in a special edition Blu-ray featuring a new 4K restoration of the original film elements.

== Proposed remake ==
In November 2009, Andrew Kevin Walker and David Fincher (the writer and director, respectively, of Seven) were attached to work on the remake, with Paramount Pictures and Columbia Pictures financing the project. Filming and theatrical release of the remake were planned for 2016, but as of 2018, the project was listed as "in development".

New reports of a planned remake emerged in 2021, with development and production now handed over to David Goyer of Phantom Four Films in collaboration with Village Roadshow, and with Sean Durkin serving as writer and director.

== See also ==
- List of American films of 1975
- Karz, 1980 Indian film which serves as a partial remake
