= The Cult (novel) =

1978 novel by Max Ehrlich

- First edition
- Author: Max Ehrlich
- Cover artist: Lawrence Ratzkin
- Language: English
- Genre: Horror fiction
- Publisher: Simon & Schuster
- Publication date: April 1, 1978
- Publication place: United States
- Media type: Print (Paperback & Hardback)
- Pages: 332 pp (first edition, paperback)
- ISBN: 0-583-13093-3 (first edition, paperback)
- OCLC: 4912889
- Dewey Decimal: 813/.5/4
- LC Class: PZ3.E334 Cu PS3509.H663

The Cult is a novel by Max Ehrlich, published in 1978 by Simon & Schuster. It was the author's tenth book. The book follows a couple's attempt to deprogram their son after he falls under the influence of a cult. The book received mixed reviews, with reviewers criticizing its writing quality and the plot as predictable, but praising it for its entertainment value.

== Plot ==
Jeff Reed falls under the influence of a religious cult called Souls for Jesus (SFJ), led by Reverend Buford Hodges. His parents hire deprogrammer John Morse, whose daughter committed suicide after becoming a member of SFJ. They kidnap him from the SFJ, and Morse uses Chinese brainwashing techniques on him, but SFJ in turn re-kidnap and re-brainwash him, and he sues his parents and Morse. The novel ends with a court scene revealing deep penetration of the US justice system by SFJ.

== Publication ==
The book was published by Simon & Schuster in 1978. Ehrlich stated that the cult depicted in the book was not based on any specific cases or real-life events.

== Reception ==
In a survey of 1970s fiction, John Sutherland called The Cult a roman à clef. A contemporary Kirkus Reviews reviewer compared the SFJ in the book to "the Moonies and the Hare Krishnas put together" and in their influence, to the Scientologists, but declared the book "numbingly obvious at every point". Several reviews criticized the writing quality, with one reviewer commenting that the book "demands no mental effort". Other reviews praised the book's entertainment value.

A reviewer writing for The State believed that it would likely offend faithful Christians, as well as members of the Unification Church, but said "it is doubtful that any of them would read it anyway". A review in The Gazette argued the book was not an attack on religion. Another reviewer described the story as interesting but also predictable, and suggested that if the reader was "looking for truth" they should instead read old newspaper headlines.
