= Week-End for Three =

1941 film by Irving Reis

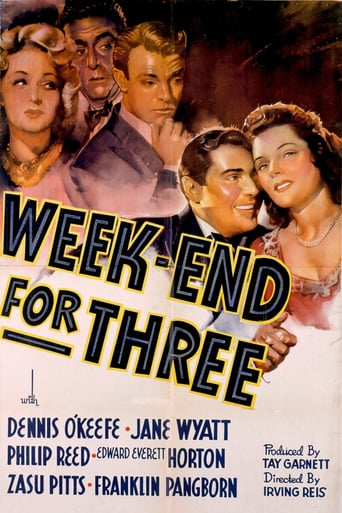
- Film poster
- Directed by: Irving Reis
- Written by: Dorothy Parker; Alan Campbell
- Story by: Budd Schulberg
- Produced by: Tay Garnett
- Starring: Dennis O'Keefe; Jane Wyatt; Phillip Reed; Edward Everett Horton; ZaSu Pitts; Franklin Pangborn
- Cinematography: Russell Metty
- Edited by: Desmond Marquette
- Music by: Roy Webb
- Production company: RKO Radio Pictures
- Distributed by: RKO Radio Pictures
- Release dates: October 23, 1941 (New York); December 12, 1941 (U.S.)
- Running time: 66 minutes
- Country: United States
- Language: English

Week-End for Three is a 1941 American comedy film directed by Irving Reis and starring Dennis O'Keefe, Jane Wyatt and Edward Everett Horton. It was produced and distributed by RKO Pictures.

== Synopsis ==
Young married couple Jim and Ellen Craig plan a weekend away together but are interrupted by the arrival of the brash Randy Bloodworth, who knew them before they were married.

== Cast ==
- Dennis O'Keefe as Jim Craig
- Jane Wyatt as Ellen Craig
- Phillip Reed as Randy Bloodworth
- Edward Everett Horton as Fred Stonebraker
- ZaSu Pitts as Anna
- Franklin Pangborn as Number Seven
- Marion Martin as Mrs. Weatherby
- Hans Conried as Desk Clerk
- Mady Lawrence as Miss Bailey
- Brooks Benedict as Old Field Inn Patron
- Jack Gargan as Old Field Inn Patron
- Russell Wade as Old Field Inn Patron
- Marie Windsor as Old Field Inn Patron

== Reception ==
The film lost over $100,000 at the box office.

== Radio adaptation ==
Week-End for Three was broadcast on the radio program Stars in the Air March 27, 1952. The 30-minute episode starred Dennis O'Keefe, Barbara Britton and Harry von Zell.

== Bibliography ==
- Fetrow, Alan G. Feature Films, 1940-1949: a United States Filmography. McFarland, 1994.
