= Spin the Glass Web =

1952 novel by Max Simon Ehrlich

First edition

Spin The Glass Web is a mystery or suspense novel written by Max Ehrlich and first published in condensed form in Cosmopolitan in 1951. The full version was published by Harper & Brothers in 1952, and in paperback by Bantam Books in 1953.

== Plot ==
An eminently successful screenwriter finds himself mixed up in a murder. The police want him. Can he prove his innocence?
