= Aatmabalam =

1985 film

- Theatrical release poster
- Directed by: Tatineni Prasad
- Written by: Ganesh Patro (dialogues)
- Screenplay by: Tatineni Prasad
- Story by: Subhash Ghai
- Based on: Karz (1980)
- Produced by: J. M. Naidu; K. Muthayala Rao
- Starring: Nandamuri Balakrishna; Bhanupriya
- Cinematography: Navakanth
- Edited by: K. Satyam
- Music by: Chakravarthy
- Production company: Sri Valli Productions
- Release date: 11 January 1985
- Running time: 123 minutes
- Country: India
- Language: Telugu

Aatmabalam (transl. Power of the Soul) is a 1985 Indian Telugu-language musical thriller film, produced by J. M. Naidu, K. Muthayala Rao under the Sri Valli Productions banner and directed by Tatineni Prasad. The film stars Nandamuri Balakrishna and Bhanupriya, with music composed by Chakravarthy. It is a remake of the Hindi film Karz (1980).

== Plot ==
The film begins with Anand Kumar Bhupathi, a tycoon who emerges victorious over his antagonist, Puligaolla Varhavataram, in a legal battle. In that carnival atmosphere, he encounters his love interest, Maya, a fortune hunter, in cahoots with Varhavataram. Now, the newlywed proceeds to their estate for the blessing of Anand's mother, Rani Vijaya Durga Devi. In between, vicious Maya slays her husband near a temple of Goddess Kaali when deranged Durga Devi dictates the goddess to give back her son. Years roll by, and Durga Prasad, a famous pop singer, is the reincarnation of Anand, and he crushes on a beauty, Vaishali. Once, in his show, Durga Prasad performs a tune allured by Anand, which haunts him of his previous life memories. After his medical checkup, his doctor suggested relaxing for a while.

Hence, Durga Prasad goes on vacation, and being unbeknownst to meet Vaishali, he lands at Anand's estate. Indeed, Vaishali is an orphan reared by Maya owing to the extortion of her uncle Kabir Dada, who is in jail. Then, step by step, Durga Prasad retrieves the past. He also learns Maya has expelled his mother and sister, Pankajavalli / Pinky, after his death. Meanwhile, Kabir acquits and he rearwards Durga Prasad that he has a bit of knowledge regarding the undercover mystery of the Kaali temple. Here, Durga Prasad completes the remaining, revealing his identity, which bewilders Kabir. Afterward, he finds the whereabouts of his mother & sister and unites them. At this point, Durga Prasad snares, confuses, horrifies Maya, and makes her confess the crime. Suddenly, Varhavataram seizes Durga Devi, Pinky, & Vaishali, but Durga Prasad rescues them and ceases his. At last, Maya dies falling into the same cliff, near Kaali temple. Finally, the movie ends on a happy note with the marriage of Durga Prasad & Vaishali.

== Cast ==
- Nandamuri Balakrishna as Anand Kumar Bhupathi (second life) / Durga Prasad
- Bhanupriya as Vaishali
- Satyanarayana as Kabir
- Sarath Babu as Anand Kumar Bhupathi (first life)
- M. N. Nambiar as Puligolla Varahavataram
- Mikkilineni as P. J. Naidu
- Ashok Kumar
- Hari Prasad as Hari
- Telephone Satyanarayana
- Silk Smita as Mayadevi
- Anjali Devi as Rani Vijaya Durga Devi
- Deepa as Pankajavalli / Pinky

== Soundtrack ==
Music was composed by Chakravarthy. Lyrics were written by Veturi.

S. No.	Song title	Singers	length
1	"Aakasha Veedhilo"	S. P. Balasubrahmanyam	4:30
2	"Chaligadu Vanikistunte"	S. P. Balasubrahmanyam, P. Susheela	4:26
3	"Chali Chaliga"	S. P. Balasubrahmanyam	4:32
4	"Oka Vennela Chinnela"	S. P. Balasubrahmanyam, P. Susheela	4:14
5	"Om Shanthi Om"	S. P. Balasubrahmanyam	3:57
