= Barney Blake, Police Reporter =

American crime drama TV series (1948)

- Genre: Crime drama
- Directed by: Dave Lewis; Garry Simpson
- Starring: Gene O'Donnell; Judy Parrish
- Country of origin: United States
- Original language: English
- No. of seasons: 1
- No. of episodes: 13

Production
- Camera setup: Single-camera
- Running time: 25 mins.

Original release
- Network: NBC
- Release: April 22 – July 8, 1948

Barney Blake, Police Reporter is an American crime drama that aired live on NBC from April 22, 1948, to July 8, 1948. NBC claimed it was the first mystery series to air on TV. The program was canceled after 13 weeks by its sponsor, American Tobacco Company. The show was packaged by Wynn Wright Associates.

== Premise ==
Set in New York City, the series centers on police reporter Barney Blake and his secretary Jennifer Allen as they solve criminal cases.

The premiere episode was "Murder Me Twice". Other episodes included "E-String Murder" on May 6, 1948.

== Time slot ==
When Barney Blake debuted, NBC had a ban that prohibited "the airing of any radio crime show before 9:30 p.m." Eastern Time. The trade publication Variety reported that the show became "one of the first major studio productions to be aired at so late an hour." It was broadcast on Thursdays.

== Critical reaction ==
The show's premiere episode was panned in a review in the trade publication Billboard. Jerry Franken wrote that the script's shortcomings undermined the "slick, Class A production". Franken predicted that if the program's scripts did not improve, the show "will go down in history not only as the first but also the worst of its breed." Variety's review of the same episode said that the show succeeded in adapting the detective genre for TV and called it "a notable advance in dramatic fare on television." It commended the way direction and camera work resulted in a feeling of movement and action and noted that Ted de Corsia's performance as a murder outshone O'Donnell's starring role.

A brief comment in the trade publication Televiser described the show as a "fast moving mystery series".

== Personnel ==
Gene O'Donnell portrayed Barney Blake, and Judy Parrish played Jennifer Allen. Garry Simpson and David Lewis were the directors. Writers included Max Ehrlich.
