= Mollé Mystery Theatre =

American anthology radio program, 1943 to 1948

An advertisement from The Salt Lake Tribune, 7 September 1943.

Mollé Mystery Theatre is a 30-minute anthology radio program that ran from 1943 to 1948 on NBC prior to its moving to the CBS network, where it ran til 1951 and was altered to center around a single character, Inspector Hearthstone. It finally ran from 1951 to 1954 on ABC. The show, sponsored initially by Sterling Drugs, manufacturers of Mollé Brushless Shaving Cream, began airing on Tuesday evenings during prime time.

In 1948, Mollé ceased sponsoring the program, and its title became Mystery Theater. It featured stories of mystery and suspense and boasted performances from up-and-coming actors such as Richard Widmark and Frank Lovejoy. The show bears no relation to the radio series ABC Mystery Theater.

Frank Telford was the producer.
