= Betty Todd =

Elizabeth Todd née Winston (born 1908 Asheville, North Carolina - December 31, 1971) was a radio director and producer in the 1940s in New York City. Todd studied radio broadcasting at Columbia University before going to work for CBS Radio. Todd was forced to resign from CBS after she was subpoenaed by, and testified before, the House Un-American Activities Committee (HUAC) in 1950. Todd died in Bath, Maine.

== Education and career ==
Todd attended high school in Buncombe County, North Carolina, and attended the University of North Carolina-Chapel Hill from 1924 to 1927 but did not receive a degree. She moved to New Orleans and worked as a bookkeeper and secretary before returning to North Carolina in 1928, when she began work as a secretary in the Department of Conversation and Development. Todd worked as a secretary n North Carolina, California, Tennessee, and Washington, D.C. from 1928 to 1938. Her secretarial and stenography work occurred alongside her involvement with the Communist Party and labor organizing efforts.

Todd's radio career began in 1940 when she worked as writer at the WBT radio station in Charlotte, North Carolina, eventually also working as a director and producer there. After moving to New York City in 1941, Todd studied radio broadcasting at Columbia and in June 1942 began a position at CBS radio. Todd joined the CBS production department as an assistant director. Todd continued to work at CBS until 1950 and was active in the Radio Director's Guild. In 1948, Todd was nominated for an executive post with the Radio Director's Guild as a councilor-at-large and was also nominated for secretary of the Radio and Television Director's Guild in 1949. During her career at CBS Todd worked as an assistant director for the Radie Harris program, an interview show, directed the Arthur Godfrey Show, and served as assistant director of network operations. She also was the producer of Joyce Jordan, Girl Interne. CBS requested and accepted Todd's resignation in 1950 due to her refusal to answer questions during her appearance before the HUAC.

== Politics ==
Todd's affiliation with the Communist Party and labor organizations began when she became acquainted with Kenneth McConnell while working at J. Walter Thompson Advertising Company Francisco in the late 1920s. Todd married McConnell, a political activist, in 1930 and they moved to Chapel Hill in 1931. McConnell was recruited into the Communist Party in 1935 and Todd joined as a member of the Communist Party sometime in the mid-1930s. When McConnell was assigned to Knoxville by the Communist Party, Todd applied for a clerk position at the Tennessee Valley Authority (TVA). While working at the TVA, Todd recruited members for the Communist Party. Following her divorce from McConnell in 1937 and subsequent marriage to Merwin "Pat" Todd, an electrician, Todd moved to New York City in 1938 then back to North Carolina in 1940. In 1940, Todd was listed as one of forty-five suspected Communist Party members employed by the TVA in a letter sent to the chair of the TVA by J. Edgar Hoover. An internal TVA investigation could not confirm that Todd was a member of the Communist Party. In 1950, she was identified by William Remington in his testimony before the House Un-American Activities Committee.

After Todd invoked the Fifth Amendment, refusing to answer questions in a HUAC hearing, she ceased working for CBS on May 15, 1950. CBS described the separation as a "requested and accepted" resignation, while Todd described it as "my summary dismissal".
