= Ek Hasina Thi (song) =

Song by Kishore Kumar, Asha Bhosle

from the album Karz
- Language: Hindi
- Released: 1980
- Length: 4:22
- Label: Saregama
- Composer: Laxmikant–Pyarelal
- Lyricist: Anand Bakshi

"Ek Hasina Thi" (transl. There was A Beautiful Lady) is a song from the Hindi film Karz, composed by the duo of Laxmikant–Pyarelal, written by Anand Bakshi and sung by Kishore Kumar and Asha Bhosle. The guitar tune is plagiarized from George Benson's song , "We As Love".

== Picturization ==
In the film, Rishi Kapoor and Tina Munim features in the Happy Version of the song sung by Kishore Kumar and Asha Bhosle. Rishi Kapoor mentioned this song as one of the songs that he feared to shoot and one of his favorites.

== Remakes and versions ==
Throughout the years, the song has been remade several times and covered by many singers. In 2020, DJ Harshit Shah remixed the song along with Brazilian Bass. He made this song as a tribute to Rishi Kapoor, who just died then. Harshit Shah addressed him as the true showman of Bollywood.

In January 2022, actor Amit Tandon recreated this song with rehashed music. He himself sang it and cited that he is a big fan of Kishore Kumar, the singer of this song.

== Awards ==
- 19th Filmfare Awards
  - Best Music Director: Laxmikant–Pyarelal: Won

== See also ==
- Binaca Geetmala annual list 1980
