= The Reincarnation of Peter Proud (novel) =

1974 novel by Max Ehrlich

- First edition, cover artist: Bill Tinker
- Author: Max Ehrlich
- Language: English
- Publisher: Bobbs-Merrill
- Publication date: 1974
- ISBN: 0-672-52001-X (first edition)
- Dewey Decimal: 813.54
- LC Class: PZ3.E334 Re

The Reincarnation of Peter Proud was written by popular fiction author Max Ehrlich. It was published in 1974 by Bobbs-Merrill and a year later by Bantam.

== Plot ==
When college professor Peter Proud is overcome with a series of ever more frightening nightmares, he seeks professional help from a colleague in the Psychology department who recommends outside help. All of his nightmares are similar, and as he relates them to a psychologist, recordings are made of him for future reference. When they are strung together they have him swimming in a lake at night and drowning at the hands of a woman who strikes at him from the safety of a rowboat, mercilessly bludgeoning him with her paddle.

Deciding there is something to his nightmares, he travels from California to the Eastern Seaboard to locate the exact location of the places he sees in his dreams - a church steeple, a town hall building and, most importantly, the lake where he keeps drowning. It helps being independently wealthy as he finds himself taking an extended sabbatical as he painstakingly goes through old newspaper records for cases of death by drowning. He eventually locates and confronts individuals who can remember the death. Although they do not recognize him because he looks different, one of them recognizes his mannerisms and believes he has come back from the dead for unspeakable reasons.

Deciding he must get closer to the principals involved in his death, he begins a romance with the daughter of the woman that may have murdered him out on the lake. At first, he practices tennis with her. Later, it becomes more serious. Meanwhile, the woman who was married to him in his previous life has never remarried. She becomes suspicious of him, especially when he starts saying and doing things that remind her of her husband. Even though he does not look like her husband, his mannerisms appear to identify him in an undeniable way. She is so certain that he is the same man as her husband that she feels she must do something about it, and possibly call him on it, if not take him out to the center of the lake and kill him all over again.

== Adaptation ==
The novel was turned into a film released in 1975.

== See also ==
- Berkeley Square, a 1929 play by John L. Balderston
- Berkeley Square, a 1933 film
- On a Clear Day You Can See Forever, a 1965 Broadway play
- On a Clear Day You Can See Forever, a 1970 film
- Transmigration, by J. T. McIntosh
- Reincarnation in Venice, by Max Ehrlich
