= Murder at Midnight (radio series) =

Murder at Midnight is an old-time radio show featuring macabre tales of suspense, often with a supernatural twist. It was produced in New York and was syndicated beginning in 1946. The show's writers included Robert Newman, Joseph Ruscoll, Max Ehrlich, and William Morwood, and it was directed by Anton M. Leader. The producer was Louis G. Cowan. The host was Raymond Morgan, who delivered the lines of introduction over Charles Paul's organ theme: "Midnight, the witching hour when the night is darkest, our fears the strongest, and our strength at its lowest ebb. Midnight, when the graves gape open and death strikes."

A total of 50 episodes were produced. Ten shows were syndicated and rerun on Mutual in 1950.

Episodes
Ep	Title	Production Date	Original Airdate	Written by
1	"The Dead Hand"	April 30, 1946	September 16, 1946	Robert Newman
A concert pianist loses his left hand in an accident. He meets a pickpocket with very nimble hands and once the pickpocket is dead, he won't need them anymore.				
2	"The Man Who Was Death"	April 30, 1946	September 23, 1946	Robert Newman
A sculpture tries to perfect his sculpture of Death by putting himself in Death's shoes.				
3	"Secret of XR3"	May 9, 1946	September 30, 1946	Max Ehrlich
A man, tired of being 3 feet tall, takes a dose of XR3 to make himself grow. How much taller will he get? What will happen to those who laugh at him now?				
4	"Wherever I Go"	May 12, 1946	October 7, 1946	William Morwood
Gordon grows tired of his rich wife Ellen but knows she will never divorce him. He gets her to buy some rat poison, gives the cook the night off and has his wife write a suicide note for a character in his book. After she dies he believes he is finally free until a suspicious stranger starts following him.				
5	"Trigger Man"	May 12, 1946	October 28, 1946	Max Ehrlich
"Chicken" Charlie Nix is a hold up thug who has never been able to fire his gun. The mob boss takes him to a doctor who tells him he only has 6 months to live.				
6	"Death's Goblet"	May 23, 1946	October 21, 1946	Sigmund Miller
Harvey's friend Arthur brings back a mysterious goblet from his travels with a legend that all who drink from it will commit murder. Harvey is not only interested in the goblet but he thinks his rich business partner Gerald and Gerald's lovely wife Susan might be interested as well.				
7	"The Heavy Death"	May 23, 1946	November 4, 1946	Robert Newman
A mad scientist makes himself “heavy” (as in heavy water, or uranium.) His might crushes men’s skulls! He also has a death ray! But the ghost of a man with a crushed skull comes for revenge!				
8	"Nightmare"	May 28, 1946	November 11, 1946	Joseph Roscoll
A woman’s murderous nightmare is explained away by her husband’s dream analysis, from hamburgers to their anniversary. But once she falls asleep, the phone rings…				
9	"The Dead Come Back"	May 28, 1946	November 18, 1946	William Morwood
10	"Terror Out Of Space"	June 4, 1946	February 24, 1947	Robert Newman
11	"The Creeper"	June 11, 1946	November 25, 1946	Joseph Roscoll
12	"The Man Who Died Yesterday"	June 11, 1946	June 30, 1947	William Morwood
13	"Till Death Do Us Part"	June 11, 1946	December 9, 1946	Joseph Roscoll
14	"Murder is a Lonely Business"	June 16, 1946	December 16, 1946	William Morwood
15	"The House Where Death Lives"	June 16, 1946	December 23, 1946	Robert Newman
16	"The Kabala"	July 28, 1946	December 31, 1946	Robert Newman
17	"Ace of Death"	July 28, 1946	January 6, 1947	Max Ehrlich
Based on Robert Louis Stevenson's The Suicide Club John Evans: ill, broke and without family and friends decides to jump off a bridge to put an end to it all. A man, Fredrick Whitney, pulls him off and tells him that jumping off a bridge is rather dull and invites him to join the Hereafter club where a card game determines who will be killed and who will be the killer.				
18	"The House Time Forgot"	August 7, 1946	January 13, 1947	Sigmund Miller
19	"Death Tolls a Requiem"	August 7, 1946	March 17, 1947	Max Ehrlich
20	"The Thirteenth Floor"	August 16, 1946	January 27, 1947	Winifred Wolfe
21	"The Mark of Cain"	August 24, 1946	September 6, 1946	A. S. Ginnes
22	"Red Wheels"	August 28, 1946	September 13, 1946	Jack Gordon
23	"The Line Is Dead"	September 8, 1946	April 7, 1947	Bafe Blau
24	"Death Across the Board"	September 18, 1946		Robert Newman
25	"Murder Out Of Mind"	November 6, 1946		Sigmund Miller
26	"Death Worshipper"	September 25, 1946	March 10, 1947	Jay Williams
27	"We Who Are About To Die"	October 11, 1946	April 21, 1947	A. S. Ginnes
28	"The Black Curtain"	October 11, 1946	February 10, 1947	Max Ehrlich
29	"The Ape Song"	October 11, 1946	April 13, 1947	Peter Martin
30	"The Man With The Black Beard"	October 11, 1946	February 3, 1947	Sigmund Miller
31	"Death Ship"	October 18, 1946	April 14, 1947	William Morwood
32	"Outcast"	October 18, 1946	February 17, 1947	Max Ehrlich
33	"Fatal Interruption"	October 18, 1946	July 14, 1947	Bafe Blau
34	"The Dispossessed"	October 24, 1946	July 21, 1947	Jack Gordon
35	"The Black Swan"	October 31, 1946	August 18, 1947	Leon Meadow
36	"Island Of The Dead"	November 6, 1946	May 5, 1947	Robert Newman
37	"The Dark Chamber"	November 6, 1946	May 26, 1947	Robert Newman
38	"Death Is No End"	November 13, 1946	June 2, 1947	A. S. Ginnes
39	"The Dark Cellar"	November 13, 1946	June 9, 1947	Max Ehrlich
40	"Murder Is Not Enough"	November 13, 1946	June 16, 1947	Bafe Blau
41	"The Face Of The Dragon"	November 20, 1946	July 7, 1947	Jack Bordun
42	"The Man Who Died Again"	November 20, 1946		Robert Newman
43	"City Morgue"	November 27, 1946	May 19, 1947	Winifred Wolfe
44	"Terror"	November 27, 1946	February 24, 1947	Joseph Ruscoll
45	"The Corridor Of Doom"	December 4, 1946	May 12, 1947	Robert Newman
46	"Appointment"	December 4, 1946	July 28, 1947	Winifred Wolfe
47	"Glory Train"	December 11, 1946	August 4, 1947	Robert Newman
48	"A Week Ago Wednesday"	December 11, 1946		Winifred Wolfe
49	"The Living Dead"	December 20, 1946	April 28, 1947	Robert Newman
50	"The Face"	December 20, 1946	August 11, 1947	Paul Monash

== Critical response ==
A review in the trade publication Variety called Murder at Midnight "just another routine chiller series", comparing its writing to horror films from 10 years earlier. It described the acting as "fairly good" and found the direction to be "mechanical rather than imaginative".
