= The Big Story (radio and TV series) =

American radio and television crime drama 1947–1955

The Big Story is an American radio and television crime drama which dramatized the true stories of real-life newspaper reporters. The only continuing character was the narrator, Bob Sloane.

== Radio ==
The Big Story
- Genre: Crime drama
- Running time: 30 minutes
- Country of origin: United States
- Language: English
- Syndicates: NBC
- Starring: Bob Sloane
- Announcer: Ernest Chappell
- Written by: Gail Ingram; Arnold Perl; Max Ehrlich
- Directed by: Tom Vietor; Harry Ingram
- Produced by: Bernard J. Prockter
- Original release: April 2, 1947 – March 23, 1955
- Opening theme: Ein Heldenleben

Sponsored by Pall Mall cigarettes, the program began on NBC Radio on April 2, 1947. With Lucky Strike cigarettes sponsoring the last two seasons, it was broadcast until March 23, 1955.

The radio series was top rated, rivaling Bing Crosby's Philco Radio Time.

Produced by Bernard J. Prockter, the shows were scripted by Gail Ingram, Arnold Perl and Max Ehrlich. Tom Vietor and Harry Ingram directed the series. Gail and Harry Ingram were husband and wife. The theme was taken from Ein Heldenleben ("A Hero's Life"), a tone poem by Richard Strauss.

Prockter was inspired to create the program after hearing about a man who was freed from a life sentence in jail by the work of two newspaper reporters in Chicago. Most of the stories in the show dealt with stories about closed cases. Ross Eaman, in his book, Historical Dictionary of Journalism, wrote that the program was "originally intended to honor reporters ignored by Pulitzer committees ...." Jim Cox also cited that plan in his book, Radio Crime Fighters: More Than 300 Programs from the Golden Age.

Each week the program recognized the reporter who wrote the story on which that episode was based and the newspaper in which the story appeared. The reporter received $500, was interviewed on the air and was acknowledged in the introduction, as in this example:

Pall Mall, famous big cigarette, presents The Big Story, another in a thrilling series based on true experiences of newspaper reporters. Tonight, to Russ Wilson of the Des Moines Tribune goes the Pall Mall award for The Big Story. Now, the authentic and exciting story of "The Case of the Ambitious Hobo."

== Television ==
The Big Story
- Genre: Anthology
- Created by: Paul H Hedrick
- Directed by: Stuart Rosenberg; David Lowell Rich
- Presented by: Burgess Meredith; Norman Rose; Ben Grauer
- Country of origin: United States
- Original language: English
- No. of seasons: 9
- No. of episodes: 349

Production
- Producer: Bernard J. Prockter
- Camera setup: Single-camera
- Running time: 24–25 minutes
- Production company: Pyramid Productions

Original release
- Network: NBC (1949–1957); Syndication (1957–1958)
- Release: September 16, 1949 – 1958

The radio series was adapted for television where it debuted on NBC on September 16, 1949. The series continued to air on NBC until June 28, 1957, after which it appeared in syndication until 1958. The half-hour program was hosted by Robert Sloane, Norman Rose, Ben Grauer, and, finally, Burgess Meredith.

Guest stars included:

- James Dean
- Sam Jaffe
- Jack Klugman
- Diane Ladd
- Martin Landau
- Lee Marvin
- Walter Matthau
- Gregory Morton
- Lois Nettleton
- Leslie Nielsen
- Steve McQueen
- Warren Oates
- Anthony Perkins
- Read Morgan
- Mark Rydell
- Jerry Stiller
- Joyce Van Patten
- Jack Warden
- Martin Balsam

Among the episodes is "Harold Faller of the Huntington Advertiser of West Virginia" (January 19, 1951), starring Francis DeSales in his first screen appearance as newspaperman Harold Faller of Huntington, West Virginia.

The theme music was two of the main themes from the tone poem Ein Heldenleben (A Hero's Life) by the German composer Richard Strauss. The series was nominated for a Primetime Emmy Awards in 1953.

The series finished at #25 in the Nielsen ratings for the 1950–1951 season, #23 for 1952-1953 and #29 for 1953–1954.

=== Lawsuit ===
A 1952 broadcast led to a lawsuit when Charles Bernstein sued NBC for $1,000,000 in damages, saying that the episode invaded his privacy. The story related how a newspaper reporter found evidence that resulted in a pardon for Bernstein, whose name was not used in the broadcast. His attorneys said that he was entitled to privacy because seven years passed between the events and the broadcast. However, a U.S. Court of Appeals ruled in 1956 that dramatizing events that were a matter of public record did not constitution invasion of privacy, and the case was thrown out.

== See also ==
- Bright Star
- Ford Theater
- Nightbeat

== Listen to ==
- Same Time, Same Station: The Big Story (January 11, 1950)
- Streaming episodes of The Big Story from Old Time Radio Researchers Group Library
