= Reincarnation in Venice =

1979 novel by Max Simon Ehrlich

- First edition Cover artist: Fred Marcellino
- Language: English
- Publisher: Simon & Schuster
- Publication date: 1979

Reincarnation in Venice is a science fiction or mystery book written by popular fiction author Max Erlich and published in 1979 by Simon & Schuster in New York.

The author begins his story by declaring that on one balmy September morning in 1954 a 25-year-old Venetian man steps out of a mansion just off the Grand Canal and into the street:

He was young, perhaps no more than twenty-five, with a darkly handsome patrician face, and was, like most Venetians of his class, exquisitely tailored. He paused for a moment, in front of the great doors of the palazzo and looked up. His wife was at one of the upper windows. He smiled at her and blew her a kiss. She waved back at him. Page 13.

Before the day is through, he will have died unceremoniously, and his body thrown into one of the canals.

The story picks up again on page 23, apparently decades later in another part of the world when a young and wealthy computer programmer walking down East 50th Street in New York, notices in the window of an antique shop an item that catches his eye.

'The window was cluttered with a variety of articles for sale - guitars, typewriters, tape recorders, clocks, golf clubs, and a hodgepodge of jewelry, rings, necklaces, bracelets, and earrings. The medallion itself was large in size, about two inches in diameter, and hung on a gold chain. Mixed with the rest of the jewelry in the window, it was rather inconspicuous. Yet, somehow, it had drawn his attention. Page 27.

and he just has to have it, even if it is overpriced, and not a legitimate hedge against inflation. Even if it is gold, it is possibly overpriced. But the medallion carries a curious coat of arms upon its face, and must have been minted privately by some noble family in Italy. And thus begins a long journey that takes him back to another man's life - and death - in Venice.

== See also ==
The Reincarnation of Peter Proud (1973) by Max Ehrlich
