= Max Ehrlich (writer) =

American dramatist (1909–1983)

- Born: Max Simon Ehrlich; October 10, 1909; Springfield, Massachusetts, US
- Died: February 11, 1983 (aged 73); Los Angeles, California, U.S.
- Education: University of Michigan
- Occupation: Writer
- Spouse: Margaret Druckman
- Children: 2
- Writing career
- Period: 1940–1981
- Genres: Mystery, science fiction
- Notable awards: Writers' War Board Award (1944)

Max Simon Ehrlich (October 10, 1909 – February 11, 1983) was an American writer. He is best known for the novel The Reincarnation of Peter Proud and the movie of the same name.

== Early life and education ==
Max Simon Ehrlich was born in Springfield, Massachusetts on October 10, 1909, to Simon and Sarah Ehrlich. After attending White Street, Forest Park Junior High, and Central High schools, he attended Rensselaer Polytechnic Institute with plans to be a chemical engineer. He went from there to the University of Michigan, from which he received a B.A. degree in journalism in 1933.

== Career ==
Despite having a college degree, Ehrlich was unable to find work in the Great Depression economy. He said, "I couldn't even get a job mowing someone's lawn for 50 cents an hour." He decided to try writing, bought a used typewriter for $10, and left home with only that typewriter.

Ehrlich began his career in newspapers, working as a correspondent for the Albany, New York Knickerbocker Press and Evening News during his college years, then after graduating as a feature writer for the Springfield, Massachusetts Republican. From there he turned to radio, working as the chief writer of the script division of WSPR in 1938 and 1939, in the script division of the American Jewish Committee from 1939 to 1941, and from 1941 to 1945 he was the assistant script director of the radio division of the American Red Cross.

After 1945, Ehrlich was a novelist, playwright, radio and TV dramatist, and author of adaptations for radio, television, and feature films. He wrote radio scripts for series including The Big Story, The Shadow, Big Town, Mr. and Mrs. North, and Murder at Midnight. His television work included scripts for the series Barney Blake, Police Reporter, The Big Story, The Defenders, The Nurses, The United States Steel Hour, and Star Trek (episode "The Apple"). Three of his feature film scripts (listed below) were adaptations of his own novels.

== Personal life and death ==
Ehrlich married Margaret Druckman and had two daughters. One daughter, Amy Ehrlich, is a writer of books for children. He died on February 11, 1983, in Los Angeles, California, aged 73.

== Papers ==
Ehrlich's papers are stored in the Archives and Museum Collections of the Wisconsin Historical Society.

== Published books ==
- The Big Eye (Doubleday, 1949)
- Spin the Glass Web (Harper & Brothers, 1952)
- First Train to Babylon (Harper, 1955)
- The Takers (Harper, 1961)
- Deep is the Blue (Doubleday, 1964)
- The High Side (Fawcett Publications, 1970)
- The Edict (Doubleday, 1971)
- The Reincarnation of Peter Proud (Bobbs-Merrill, 1974)
- The Savage is Loose (Bantam Books, 1974)
- The Cult (Simon & Schuster, 1978)
- Reincarnation in Venice (Simon & Schuster, 1979)
- Naked Beach (Granada, 1979)
- The Big Boys (Houghton Mifflin, 1981)
- Shaitan (Arbor House, 1981)

== Filmography ==
=== Films ===
Year	Film	Credit	Notes
1953	The Glass Web	Story by	Based on his novel Spin the Glass Web
1954	The Lie	Written By	
1961	The Naked Edge	Story by	Based on his novel First Train to Babylon
1961	I Will Not Confess	Story by	
1967	Sail To Glory	Written By	Co-wrote screenplay with Gerald Schnitzer
1972	Z.P.G.	Written By, Associate Producer	Co-wrote screenplay with Frank De Felitta
1974	The Savage Is Loose	Written By	Co-wrote screenplay with Frank De Felitta
1975	The Reincarnation of Peter Proud	Written By	Based on the novel of the same name

=== Television ===
Year	TV Series	Credit	Notes
1950	Sure as Fate	Writer	2 Episodes
1950–52	Suspense	Writer	5 Episodes
1951–58	Studio One In Hollywood	Writer	4 Episodes
1952	Tales of Tomorrow	Writer	4 Episodes
1952	Man Against Crime	Writer	1 Episode
1954	The Big Story	Writer	2 Episodes
1954	The Mail Story	Writer	1 Episode
1956	Lux Video Theatre	Writer	1 Episode
1956	Navy Log	Writer	4 Episodes
1956–57	Assignment Foreign Legion	Writer	7 Episodes
1958	The Court of Last Resort	Writer	1 Episode
1959	Deadline	Writer	3 Episodes
1959–60	No Hiding Place	Writer, Script Editor	
1960	Winston Churchill: The Valiant Years	Writer	1 Episode
1961	The Witness	Writer	1 Episode
1961	Armstrong Circle Theatre	Writer	1 Episode
1961	The United States Steel Hour	Writer	1 Episode
1961	Tallahassee 7000	Writer	4 Episodes
1961–62	The Defenders	Writer	4 Episodes
1962	General Electric Theater	Writer	1 Episode
1962	Checkmate	Writer	1 Episode
1962	Target: The Corruptors!	Writer	1 Episode
1962	The Dick Powell Show	Writer	1 Episode
1963	The Untouchables	Writer	1 Episode
1963	Arrest and Trial	Writer	1 Episode
1965	For The People	Writer	1 Episode
1965	Voyage To The Bottom of the Sea	Writer	1 Episode
1966	Jericho	Writer	1 Episode
1966	Run For Your Life	Writer	1 Episode
1967	Star Trek	Writer	1 Episode
1967	The Wild Wild West	Writer	1 Episode

== Awards ==
- 1944: Writers' War Board Award
- 1963: Huntington Hartford Foundation Fellowship
