= List of women identified as communists in Red Channels =

During the early days of the Cold War, many prominent women were listed as communists or fellow travellers in the American anti-communist publication Red Channels: The Report of Communist Influence in Radio and Television in June 1950. As a result of being listed in the pages of this volume, many of these 41 women found it difficult to find employment in media industries.

== List ==
- Stella Adler: Actress, director
- Edith Atwater: Actress
- Vera Caspary: Writer, novelist
- Mady Christians: Actress; council member, Actors' Equity Association
- Louise Fitch: Actress
- Ruth Gordon: Actress, writer
- Shirley Graham: Musician; writer; founding member of Sojourners for Truth and Justice
- Uta Hagen: Actress, teacher
- Lillian Hellman: Playwright, author
- Rose Hobart: Actress; board member, Screen Actors' Guild
- Judy Holliday: Actress
- Lena Horne: Singer, actress
- Marsha Hunt: Actress
- Donna Keath: Actress
- Pert Kelton: Actress
- Adelaide Klein: Actress
- Gypsy Rose Lee: Burlesque artist; quiz show host; recording secretary American Guild of Variety Artists
- Madeline Lee: Actress, social activist
- Ray Lev: Concert pianist
- Ella Logan: Singer
- Aline MacMahon: Actress
- Margo, sometimes known as Margo Albert: Actress, dancer
- Jean Muir: Actress
- Meg Mundy: Actress
- Dorothy Parker: Writer; co-founder Hollywood Anti-Nazi League
- Minerva Pious: Actress
- Anne Revere: Actress; secretary, Screen Actors Guild
- Selena Royle: Actress
- Hazel Scott: Musician, actress
- Lisa Sergio: Radio commentator
- Ann Shepherd: Actress
- Gale Sondergaard: Actress
- Hester Sondergaard: Actress
- Helen Tamiris: Choreographer
- Betty Todd: Director; secretary, Radio and Television Directors Guild
- Hilda Vaughn: Actress
- Fredi Washington: Actress; journalist, The People's Voice; secretary, Negro Actors Guild of America
- Margaret Webster: Author, director, producer
- Ireene Wicker: Radio show host
- Betty Winkler: Actress
- Lesley Woods: Actress
- Adelaide Bean: Actress
