= List of Nina Foch performances =

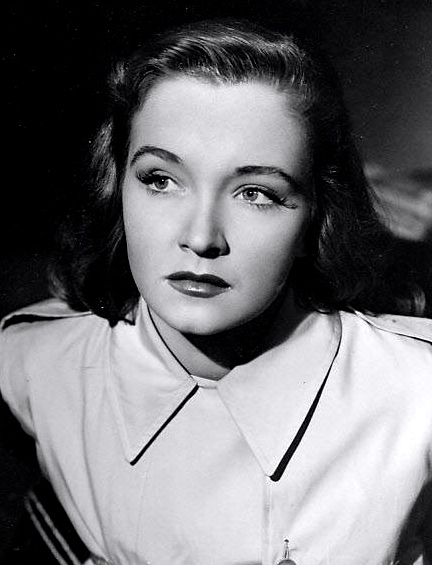
Foch in Escape in the Fog (1945)

Nina Foch (April 20, 1924 – December 5, 2008) was an American actress whose career spanned over six decades. She began her career appearing in B movies for Columbia Pictures at age 19, and subsequently starred in several Broadway productions in the late 1940s and 1950s. She went on to gain widespread attention for her role as Milo Roberts in An American in Paris (1951), and gained critical notice for her role in the drama Executive Suite (1954), for which she won a National Board of Review Award and was nominated for the Academy Award for Best Supporting Actress.

Other notable roles included as Bithiah in Cecil B. DeMille's The Ten Commandments (1956), and as Helena Glabrus in Stanley Kubrick's Spartacus (1960). Beginning in the 1960s, Foch shifted her focus to teaching, and began instructing at the University of Southern California's School of Cinematic Arts, but continued to appear in numerous television series and occasional films, such as the 1968 Columbo pilot TV-film Prescription: Murder, Mahogany (1975), The Great Houdini (1976), and the horror film Jennifer (1978).

Foch's later film credits include the thriller Hush, the independent comedy-drama Pumpkin (2002), and the romantic comedy How to Deal (2003). Foch made her final screen appearance in a 2007 episode of the television series The Closer, before her death in December 2008, aged 84.

== Film ==
Year	Title	Role	Notes	Ref.
1943	Wagon Wheels West	Jan Colburn	Short film	
1943	The Return of the Vampire	Nicki Saunders		
1944	Nine Girls	Alice Blake		
1944	She's a Soldier Too	Tessie Legruda		
1944	Shadows in the Night	Lois Garland		
1944	Cry of the Werewolf	Celeste		
1944	Strange Affair	Frieda Brenner		
1944	She's a Sweetheart	Jeanne		
1945	A Song to Remember	Constantia		
1945	I Love a Mystery	Ellen Monk		
1945	Escape in the Fog	Eileen Carr		
1945	Boston Blackie's Rendezvous	Sally Brown		
1945	A Thousand and One Nights	Harem Girl	Uncredited	
1945	My Name Is Julia Ross	Julia Ross		
1945	Prison Ship	Anne Graham		
1947	Johnny O'Clock	Harriet Hobson		
1947	The Guilt of Janet Ames	Susie Pearson		
1948	The Dark Past	Betty		
1949	The Undercover Man	Judith Warren		
1949	Johnny Allegro	Glenda Chapman		
1951	St. Benny the Dip	Linda Kovacs		
1951	An American in Paris	Milo Roberts		
1952	Young Man With Ideas	Joyce Laramie		
1952	Scaramouche	Marie Antoinette		
1953	Sombrero	Elena Cantu		
1953	Fast Company	Mercedes Bellway		
1954	Executive Suite	Erica Martin	National Board of Review Award for Best Supporting Actress; Special Jury Prize (Venice Film Festival); Nominated - Academy Award for Best Supporting Actress	
1954	Four Guns to the Border	Maggie Flannery		
1955	You're Never Too Young	Gretchen Brendan	Martin and Lewis comedy	
1955	Illegal	Ellen Miles		
1956	The Ten Commandments	Bithiah		
1956	Three Brave Men	Lt. Mary Jane McCoy		
1959	Ten Little Indians	Vera Claythorne	Television film	
1960	Cash McCall	Maude Kennard		
1960	Spartacus	Helena Glabrus		
1968	Columbo: Prescription: Murder	Carol Flemming	Television film	
1969	Gidget Grows Up	Bibi Crosby	Television film	
1971	Such Good Friends	Julie's mother		
1972	The Scarecrow	Goody Rickby	Television film	
1973	Female Artillery	Amelia Craig	Television film	
1973	Salty	Mrs. Penninger		
1975	Mahogany	Miss Evans		
1976	The Great Houdini	Rev. Le Veyne	Television film	
1978	Jennifer	Mrs. Calley		
1978	Child of Glass	Lavinia Culp	Television film	
1979	Ebony, Ivory and Jade	Dr. Adela Teba	Television film	
1981	Rich and Famous	Literary party guest		
1986	Nomads	Real estate agent		
1988	Dixie Lanes	Hazel Laidlaw		
1988	Outback Bound	Samantha's Mother	Television film	
1989	Skin Deep	Alex's Mother		
1992	In the Arms of a Killer	Mrs. Venible	Television film	
1992	The Sands of Time	Ellen Scot	Television film	
1993	Sliver	Evelyn McEvoy		
1993	Morning Glory	Miss Beasly		
1994	Alien Nation: Dark Horizon	Burak	Television film	
1996	It's My Party	Mrs. Theis		
1997	'Til There Was You	Sophia Monroe		
1998	Hush	Alice Baring		
1998	Family Blessings	Peg Miller	Television film	
1998	Shadow of Doubt	Sylvia Saxon		
2002	Pumpkin	Betsy Collander		
2003	How to Deal	Grandma Halley		
2004	Back When We Were Grownups	Mrs. Holmes	Television film	

=== Television ===
Year	Title	Role	Notes
1949	The Philco-Goodyear Television Playhouse	Elizabeth	Episode: "Three Cornered Moon"
1949	The Chevrolet Tele-Theatre	Wife	Episodes: "Temporarily Purple", "Half an Hour"
1949–1954	Suspense		
1950–1952	Lux Video Theatre		Episodes: "The Key", "The Magnolia Touch", "Dames Are Poison", "Mine to Have"
1951	Two Girls Named Smith		
1951	The Nash Airflyte Theater		Episode: "The Case of the Calico Dog"
1951	Faith Baldwin Romance Theatre		Episode: "The Bride from Broadway"
1951	Cameo Theatre		Episode: "Betrayal"
1951	Somerset Maugham TV Theatre		Episode: "In Hiding"
1951–1952	Lights Out		Episodes: "Blood Relation", "The House of Dust"
1951–1952	Pulitzer Prize Playhouse		Episodes: "The Jungle", "The Skin of Our Teeth", "The Buccaneer", "Icebound"
1952	Chesterfield Presents		Episode: "A Moment of Memory"
1952	Schlitz Playhouse		Episode: "World So Wide"
1952	Tales of Tomorrow		Episode: "Bound Together"
1952–1958	Studio One		Eight episodes
1953	Hollywood Opening Night		Episode: "Legal Affair"
1953	Armstrong Circle Theatre		Episodes: "Ski Story", "Only This Night"
1953	The Philip Morris Playhouse		Episode: "Room 203"
1954	Justice		Episode: "Ride with Terror"
1954	Danger		Episodes: "See No Evil", "Hand Me Down"
1954	Producers' Showcase	Kaye Thorndyke	Episode: "State of the Union"
1954–1960	The United States Steel Hour	Julia Walton / Grace Barlow	Four episodes
1955	The Colgate Comedy Hour	Sophia Teale	Episode: "Roberta"
1955–1957	Climax!	Caroline Emmet / Emily Rone	Episodes: "Deadly Climate", "Night of Execution"
1955–1959	The Loretta Young Show	Joan Rogers / Mrs. Graff	Episodes: "The Red Dress", "Reunion"
1956	The 20th Century-Fox Hour	Susan Harland / Joan Byrnes	Episodes: "One Life", "Yacht on the High Sea"
1956	Playwrights '56	Belle Thurmond / Mrs. Scott	Episodes: "The Undiscovered Country", "The Answer"
1956–1958	Playhouse 90		Three episodes
1957	The Alcoa Hour	Brita	Episode: "A Double Life"
1957	Kraft Theatre		Episodes: "Nothing Personal", "A Night of Rain"
1957	Wagon Train	Clara Beauhaump	Episode: "The Clara Beauchamp Story"
1958	Matinee Theatre	Beatrice	Episodes: "Much Ado About Nothing, Pt. 1", "Much Ado About Nothing, Pt.2"
1958	Pursuit	Mrs. Claire Holden	Episode: "Ticket to Tangier"
1959	The Thin Man		Episode: "Lady Frankenstein"
1959	Rawhide	Madrina Wilcox	Episode: "Incident of the Judas Trap"
1960	The Play of the Week	Andromache	Episode: "Tiger at the Gates"
1960	Moment of Fear	Sally Mellanby	Episode: "The Golden Deed"
1961	The Americans	Rose Greenbow	Episode: "The Rebellious Rose"
1961	Shirley Temple's Storybook	Merwitch	Episode: "The Little Mermaid"
1961	Checkmate	Anne Elliot	Episode: "State of Shock"
1961–1964	Route 66	Samantha / Autumn Ely / Lillian Aldrich	Four episodes
1962	Bus Stop	Kitty Blaine	Episode: "Cry to Heaven"
1962	The Dick Powell Theatre	Ginny Thatcher	Episode: "The Seeds of April"
1962	Theatre '62	Mrs. Danvers	Episode: "Rebecca"
1962	Naked City	Kitty Lamson / Maude Hutchinson	Episodes: "The Sweetly Smiling Face of Truth", "The Fingers of Henri Tourelle"
1963	The Virginian	Frances Graham	Episode: "Vengeance is the Spur"
1963	Sam Benedict	Nora Hildon	Episode: "Of Rusted Cannons and Fallen Sparrows"
1963	Arrest and Trial	Ellen Burnham	Episode: "My Name is Martin Burnham"
1963	Kraft Suspense Theatre	Sarah Middleton	Episode: "The End of the World, Baby"
1963	The Greatest Show on Earth	Angelica Cellini	Episode: "Leaves in the Wind"
1963	The Outer Limits	Eva Fraser	Episode: "The Borderland"
1964	Burke's Law	Anjanette Delacroix	Episode: "Who Killed 1/2 of Glory Lee?"
1964	Mr. Broadway	Maggie	Episode: "Maggie, Queen of the Jungle"
1965	Dr. Kildare	Georgia Pettigrew	Episode: "My Name is Lisa, and I Am Lost"
1965	Combat!	Madame Carmaux	Episode: "The Casket"
1966	A Man Called Shenandoah	Marlee Cole	Episode: "Marlee"
1966	The Long, Hot Summer	Carlotta	Episode: "Carlotta, Come Home"
1967	I Spy	Gerta	Episode: "Child Out of Time"
1967	Bob Hope Presents the Chrysler Theatre	Vera Stannard / Dee	Episodes: "A Time to Love", "And Baby Makes Five"
1967	Bonanza	Clarissa Cartwright	Episode: "Clarissa"
1968–1970	The Name of the Game	Mrs. Fredericks / Angela Morgan	Three episodes
1968–1973	The Mod Squad	Mrs. Dykstra / Virginia Westphal	Episodes: "Don't Kill My Child", "Love"
1969	The Wild Wild West	Duchess Sophia	Episode: "The Night of the Cossacks"
1969	Gunsmoke	Agatha Corey	Episode: "Coreyville"
1970	Paris 7000	Emma Torrance	Episode: "No Place to Hide"
1970	The F.B.I.	Terry Simms	Episode: "The Dealer"
1970	To Rome with Love	Diana Masterson	Episode: "Beautiful People"
1970	McCloud	Police Sergeant F.J. Dameron	Episode: "Walk in the Dark"
1971	That Girl	Frances Nelson	Episode: "That Script"
1971	Men at Law	Barbara Masters	Episode: "Marathon"
1973	Hawaii Five-O	Marian Scott	Episode: "Little Girl Blue"
1973	The Brian Keith Show	Mrs. Peterson	Episode: "Sean's Midas Touch"
1973	The Wide World of Mystery	Nellie	Episode: "A Little Bit Like Murder"
1973	Owen Marshall, Counselor at Law	Sylvia Mitchell	Episode: "A Lesson in Loving"
1973–1976	Barnaby Jones	Myra Westmore / Eleanor DeRoche	Episodes: "The Stalking Horse", "Divorce - Murderer's Style"
1974	The Magician	Irene Denore	Episode: "The Illusion of the Stainless Steel Lady"
1974	The ABC Afternoon Playbreak	Ceil	Episode: "Oh Baby, Baby, Baby"
1975	Kolchak: The Night Stalker	Madame Trevi	Episode: "The Trevi Collection"
1977	McMillan (formally McMillan and Wife)	Marietta Galway	Episode: "Phillip's Game"
1979	Lou Grant	Mrs. Polk	Episode: "Hollywood"
1985–1986	Shadow Chasers	Dr. Juliana Moorhouse	Three episodes
1986	Trapper John, M.D.	Julie Luden	Episode: "Play Your Hunch"
1986	Comedy Factory	Hannah Kingsley	Episode: "Chameleon"
1986	The New Mike Hammer	Mildred Hoftsteder	Episode: "The Golden Lady"
1988	War and Remembrance	Comtesse de Chambrun	Mini-series
1990	Room for Romance		Episode: "A Midsummer Night's Reality"
1990	L.A. Law	Marcia Schwartz	Episode: "Smoke Gets in Your Thighs"
1990	Hunter	Gloria Morrell	Episode: "Acapulco Holiday"
1990	Dear John	Mrs. Lacey	Episode: "Homeward Bound"
1991–1994	Murder, She Wrote	Rebecca Kinkaid / Katie Emhardt	Episodes: "Death in Hawaii", "Tainted Lady"
1992	Reasonable Doubts	Carmela Kaufman	Episodes: "Lifelines, Pt. 1", "Lifelines, Pt. 2"
1993	Armistead Maupin's Tales of the City	Frannie Halcyon	Five episodes
1994	Missing Persons	Bernice	Episode: "If You Could Pick Your Own Parents..."
1999	Dharma & Greg	Beatrice	Episode: "Death & Violins"
2000	Bull	Madeleine	Eight episodes
2000	Just Shoot Me!	Catherine DuChamp	Episode: "Dial 'N' for Murder"
2005–2006	NCIS	Mrs. Victoria Mallard	Episodes: "Untouchable", "The Meat Puzzle"
2007	The Closer	Doris Donnelly	Episode: "The Round File", (final appearance)

== Stage credits ==
Year	Title	Role	Notes	Ref.
1947	John Loves Mary	Mary McKinley	Music Box Theatre	
1949	Twelfth Night	Olivia	Empire Theatre	
1950	A Phoenix Too Frequent	Dynamene	Fulton Theatre	
1950	King Lear	Cordelia	National Theatre	
1955	Measure for Measure	Isabella	Phoenix Theatre; American Shakespeare Theatre at Stratford	
1955	The Taming of the Shrew	Katharine	Phoenix Theatre; American Shakespeare Theatre at Stratford	
1960	A Second String	Jane	Eugene O'Neill Theatre	
1967	Ways and Means	—N/a	Director; ANTA Theatre	

== Radio appearances ==
Year	Program	Episode	Ref.
1952	Cavalcade of America	"The Nurse Who Forgot Fear"	
1952	Philip Morris Playhouse	"The Room Beyond"	
1952	Theatre Guild on the Air	The Unguarded Hour	
1953	Theatre Guild on the Air	Cass Timberlane	
1953	Broadway Playhouse	Plan for Escape	
