= Joyce Jordan, M.D. =

Radio soap opera

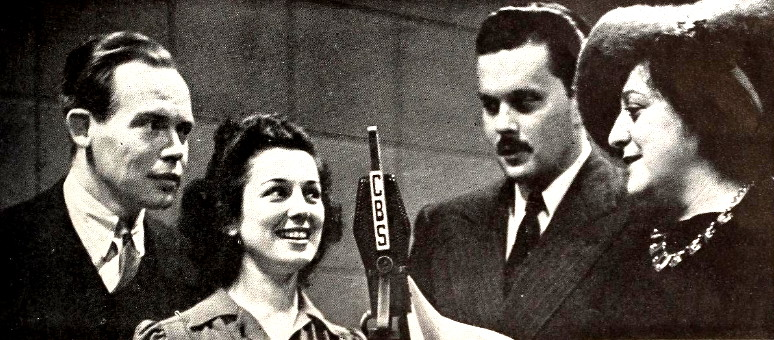
- Joyce Jordan — Girl Interne actors: Myron McCormick (as Paul Sherwood), Ann Shepherd (as Joyce Jordan), Erik Ralf (as Dr. Hans Simons) and Adelaide Klein (who played a variety of roles) in a photograph from 1940.
- Other names: Joyce Jordan, Girl Interne
- Genre: Soap opera
- Running time: 15 minutes
- Country of origin: United States
- Language: English
- Syndicates: CBS; NBC; ABC
- Announcer: Ron Rawson; Ken Roberts; Len Sterling
- Written by: Julian Funt
- Produced by: Himan Brown
- Original release: May 30, 1938 – July 1, 1955

Joyce Jordan, M.D. is a 1938-1955 radio soap opera in the United States. It was broadcast on ABC, CBS and NBC at various times during the era of old-time radio.

Donna Halper, in her book, Invisible Stars: A Social History of Women in American Broadcasting, cited Jordan as one of the women in soap operas who "had careers ... which, of course, became a struggle as they tried to balance their work with their desire for a family."

== Origin ==
Radio Varieties magazine reported in its September 1940 issue that the concept of the Joyce Jordan storyline originated during a ride on a bus in New York City. Producer Himan Brown and author Julian Funt sat behind a young couple "who were arguing the age-old theory that marriage and a career do not mix." As the two men who developed radio programs overheard the conversation, the storyline of Joyce Jordan emerged in their minds.

== Plot ==
The program's national network debut was May 30, 1938, on CBS as Joyce Jordan, Girl Interne. It had first been test-marketed for 21 weeks in 1937 on three stations in New England. On June 28, 1937, it was moved to WEAF in New York City, New York, to be carried on four stations.

The name changed to Joyce Jordan, M.D. in 1942 after the title character passed her medical exams and became employed at a "large city hospital."

Radio historian John Dunning wrote in his book On the Air: The Encyclopedia of Old-Time Radio, that despite some changes in plot, "the theme of a woman's difficulty in a man's world remained." In the early episodes, Dr. Jordan had to choose between a variety of suitors. On the February 19, 1940, episode, she married foreign correspondent Paul Sherwood, who was her patient. Later, she had to deal with her husband's "bitter and neurotic sister." She also had to struggle with the demands of being a physician and a wife.

After graduating from her internship, Dr. Jordan was a surgeon at Hotchkiss Memorial Hospital in a mythical place named Preston. Dr. Jordan's motto, as spoken at the beginning of each episode, was "The sick in body, I try to heal; the sick in soul, I try to comfort; For to everyone — rich or poor, young or old — a doctor's hand is a helping hand."

From the beginning, Brown and Funt sought to make the stories in the program more realistic than what listeners might have heard in other medically themed soap operas. Dr. Jordan never performed an operation on the program, never worked with experimental medicine and avoided psychological elements.

As time went on, Dr. Jordan's role morphed from active participant in the episodes to one that Jim Cox, in his book The Great Radio Soap Operas, described as "hostess of her long-running program, merely narrating the stories ..."

In 1948, Procter & Gamble contemplated merging Joyce Jordan, M.D. with its Road of Life program to create a single half-hour show. Combining scripts was found to be feasible, but the idea was dropped because the sponsor and the advertising agencies for the two programs "found that the commercial copy for the two products, Dreft and Duz, could not be suitably handled" in the proposed version.

== Schedule ==
The program's broadcast schedule is shown in the table below.

Beginning Date	Ending Date	Network	Sponsor
May 30, 1938	March 23, 1945	CBS	Calox Tooth Powder (1938–1939); General Foods (1939–1945)
April 2, 1945	October 8, 1948	NBC	Dreft
December 10, 1951	April 11, 1952	ABC	Lever Brothers
January 3, 1955	July 1, 1955	NBC	NA

Source: John Dunning: On the Air: The Encyclopedia of Old-Time Radio

In 1948, Joyce Jordan, M.D. was replaced by a spin-off, The Brighter Day. Jim Cox wrote: "The Brighter Day premiered on the NBC network on October 11, 1948. But it was actually rolled out on another drama some time before that." Dr. Jordan lived near the Dennis family's hometown of Three Rivers, and listeners of the Jordan program became acquainted with the Dennises in 1948. Cox wrote, "By the time Dr. Jordan said 'good-by' on her final broadcast on Friday, October 8, 1948, the fans were already acquainted with the family that would replace her. The following Monday listeners could easily connect with the new series growing out of the show they had been hearing for so long."

Joyce Jordan, M.D. returned for several months in 1951–52 on ABC, and was then revived for another six months in 1955 on NBC. The cancellation on NBC in 1955 was reported to be part of a reshaping of the network's daytime programming, as executives "hoped to stave off TV awhile longer" by replacing its soap operas with "an innovative multihour magazine called Weekday" that was similar in format to its weekend Monitor program.

== Cast ==
Seven actresses — Helen Claire, Rita Johnson, Ann Shepherd, Betty Winkler, Elspeth Eric, Gertrude Warner and Fran Carlon — had the title role at various times. Other characters and the actors and actresses who played them included those shown in the table below.

- Ethel Owen as Cassie
- Myron McCormick as Paul Sherwood
- Eric Rolf as Dr. Hans Simons
- Lesley Woods as Margot Sherwood
- Richard Widmark as Dr. Alan Webster
- Irene Hubbard as Dr. Tracy
- Ethel Owen
  Eda Heinemann as Dr. Molly Hedegrow
- Alan Devitt as Roger Walton
- Patricia Ryan as Myra Lee
- Raymond Edward Johnson as Dr. Cliff Reed
- Raymond Edward Johnson as Dr. Alexander Grey
- Boyd Crawford as Greg Ogden
- Ethel Blume as Gloria Blaine
- Frank Lovejoy as Victor Manion
- Vera Allen as Ada Manion
- Charles Webster as Mike Malone
- James Monks as Edgar Jarvis
- Charlotte Holland
- Hope Allison
- Bud Collyer as Dr. Henry Powell
- Bill Johnstone as Dr. Hunt
- George Coulouris as Neil Reynolds
- Stefan Schnabel as Herbert Yost

Source: Terrace, Vincent (1999). Radio Programs, 1924-1984: A Catalog of More Than 1800 Shows, except as noted.

Others who often appeared on the program were Mary Jane Higby, Michael Fitzmaurice, Rex Ingram, Agnes Moorehead and Theodore Newton. Announcers included Ron Rawson, Ken Roberts and Len Sterling. Himan Brown was the producer, and Julian Funt was the writer.
