= NBC Bandstand =

American radio music series (1956–1959)

- Other names: Bert Parks' Bandstand
- Genre: Big band
- Running time: 55–120 minutes
- Hosted by: Bert Parks
- Starring: Skitch Henderson; Richard Hayes; Dorothy Olsen
- Directed by: Parker Gibbs
- Produced by: Bob Sadoff
- Recording studio: NBC Radio City Studios
- Original release: July 30, 1956 – April 24, 1959

NBC Bandstand is an American music radio program that was broadcast on NBC July 30, 1956 - April 24, 1959, with portions simulcast on NBC television.

== Overview ==
Bert Parks was the master of ceremonies for the program, which presented live music from big bands. Musical performances were supplemented with Parks's interviews of guest performers. He also sang and provided "amusing commentary".

The premiere episode featured James Petrillo leading an orchestra that included bandleaders Carmen Cavallaro, Larry Clinton, Jimmy Dorsey, Tommy Dorsey, Ted Lewis, Guy Lombardo, Johnny Long, and Russ Morgan, with each man playing a solo of about 30 seconds of the song most closely identified with him. For the rest of the first week, Lombardo and his orchestra were featured on Monday, Wednesday, and Friday, with the Dorsey Brothers Orchestra featured on Tuesday and Thursday. Other guests during the first week were Oscar Hammerstein II and Mr and Mrs. Arthur Murray. Other leaders who appeared later on the series with their orchestras included Les Elgart, Wayne King, Freddy Martin, and Claude Thornhill. Guest singers who appeared on the program included Blossom Dearie and Al Hibbler.

Skitch Henderson led the program's studio orchestra. Richard Hayes was the regular male singer. Effective June 17, 1957, Dorothy Olsen was added as a regular.

Beginning on January 14, 1957, the program conducted a "Jingle-Jangler Contest" that offered a prize of $1,000 or more to a listener who could correctly identify a mystery celebrity. A mystery person gave a clue each day with a disguised voice. Once during each half-hour of the program Parks called a person who had sent in a postcard. (Cards were drawn from an on-stage barrel by members of the studio audience.) Correct identification during the first week resulted in a prize of $1,000. If no correct identification was made, another $1,000 was added for each week.

== Production ==
The radio portion of the program was initially broadcast on weekdays from 10 a.m. to noon Eastern Time. Beginning April 29, 1957, the show's length was cut to 85 minutes. Effective March 3, 1958, the program was shortened to run from 11:05 a.m. to noon and was retitled Bert Parks' Bandstand. NBC executive William R. Goodheart coordinated the show. Bob Sadoff was the producer, and Parker Gibbs was one of the directors.

NBC renovated a studio in its Radio City facilities in New York for the show. The conversion created "a permanent hotel-style setting, with an ornate wrought iron motif, some 40 dining tables, elevated balconies on either side, and a tiered bandstand".

== Television ==
The TV simulcast presented the 10:30 to 11 a.m. E. T. segment of the radio program. On November 26, 1956, The Price Is Right replaced the simulcast. The New York Times reported that lack of a sponsor and "operational problems" led to ending the telecast. A report in TV Radio Mirror said, "... it was decided that the radio audience was losing out on many things that were clear to TV viewers, so it became strictly radio, slanted to a listening audience". The simulcast's competition included Arthur Godfrey Time and The Garry Moore Show.

== Critical response ==
A review of the premiere episode in The New York Times said, "The array of talent on this first show was, indeed, impressive" and said that the musical styles were varied enough to interest almost anyone who might listen or watch. The review added that Parks was inclined to detract from featured performers because of his "energetic style", which made him "inclined to dominate a program".

A review in the trade publication Billboard said that the June 19, 1958, episode provided "a good intro to jazz for the housefrau". The review also complimented the work of the studio musicians.

== Recognition ==
NBC Bandstand was named Favorite Radio Music Program in the TV Radio Mirror Awards for 1956-57 and 1957-58. Parks was named Favorite Radio Musical Master of Ceremonies in the same awards for 1957-58.
