= Peter Chambers =

Peter Chambers may refer to:

- Peter Chambers (rower) (born 1990), British rower
- Peter Chambers (footballer) (1878–1952), English footballer
- Peter Chambers (died 1609), Catholic seminarian who converted to Protestantism, convicted of sodomy and hanged in Exeter
- Peter Chambers, private detective protagonist of Crime and Peter Chambers, American old-time radio program
