= Lights Out (1949 TV series) =

1949 American TV anthology series

- Directed by: William Corrigan; Kingman T. Moore
- Presented by: Jack La Rue; Frank Gallop
- Country of origin: United States

Production
- Producers: Herbert Swope Jr.; Fred Coe

Original release
- Network: NBC
- Release: July 12, 1949 – September 29, 1952

Lights Out is an American television anthology series that featured dramas of thrills and suspense. Broadcast on NBC from July 12, 1949, until September 29, 1952, it was the first TV dramatic program to use a split-screen display.

== Overview ==
Lights Out was an adaptation of the radio series of the same name. The series was preceded by four Lights Out TV specials in 1946.

Jack LaRue was the initial host for the program. Frank Gallop, who replaced him in 1950 was described as "the hollow-voiced man with the ectoplasmic eyebrows." Episodes in the first season featured actors who were relatively unknown. The last two seasons had better-known actors, including Eddie Albert, Billie Burke, Yvonne DeCarlo, Boris Karloff, Raymond Massey, Burgess Meredith, Leslie Nielsen, and Basil Rathbone.

The program's demise began on October 15, 1951, with the debut of I Love Lucy as its competition on CBS. Mike Dann, who was then program chief at NBC, said later, "We never knew what had happened, but it happened and it happened fast."

== Episodes ==
Each episode began with "a close shot of a pair of eyes, then a bloody hand reaching to turn out the lights, followed by an eerie laugh and the words, 'Lights out, everybody ...'" Another version had Gallop blow out a candle. Helen Wheatley wrote in the book Gothic Television that Lights Out "sought to terrify viewers through the deployment of low budget sound effects and minimal orchestration, which both betrayed a radiophonic background and would become specific to Gothic television (the sepulchral tonal quality of the narrator's voice, the combination of resonant musical instruments to create eerie sound effects, and so on)."

Some episodes were created for the show, and some were adaptations of other material. Stories frequently included lonely country roads, people who returned from the dead, and spooky houses.

Partial List of Episodes of Lights Out
Date	Episode	Actor(s)
September 23, 1949	"The Whisper"	Paul Winchell
December 5, 1949	"The Fall of the House of Usher"	Helmut Dantine, Pamela Conroy, Stephen Courtleigh
January 2, 1950	"The Elevator"	Jack Hartley, Helene Dumas, James Van Dyk, Delores Badloni, Royal Dano, Jack Jason
April 10, 1950	"Faithful Heart"	Anne Francis
June 12, 1950	"The Determined Lady"	Ethel Griffies, Donald Foster, Robert Eckles, Gene Blakely, Lee Nugent, Fred Barron
June 19, 1950	"A Child Is Crying"	David Cole, Frank M. Thomas, Nielsen, Mary Stuart MacDonald, Florence Robinson, Sam Alexander, Martin Brandt, Jason Johnson
June 26, 1950	"Encore"	Don Hanmer, Adelaide Klein, Denise Alexander, Heywood Hale Braun, Reginald Mason
September 18, 1950	"The Leopard Lady"	Martin Brandt, A. J. Herbert, Karloff, Ronald Long
October 2, 1950	"The Posthumous Deed"	Ed Begley, Biff Elliott, Arthur Hansen, Kenneth Renard, Blair Davis, Roland Hogue, Leonard Sherer
October 9, 1950	"Just What Happened"	John Howard, Dick Purdy, Rita Lynn, Alan Stevenson, Lolla Hespon, William Reed, James Rafferty, Garr Smith, William Branch
December 4, 1950	"Beware This Woman"	Veronica Lake
February 5, 1951	"The House of Dust"	Anthony Quinn, Nina Foch
April 23, 1951	"The Fonceville Curse"	Patric Knowles, Rosalind Ivan, Alma Lawton, Donald Morrison
April 30, 1951	"Grey Reminder" (adaptation of Edith Wharton's "The Pomegranate Seed")	Beatrice Straight, John Newland, Helene Dumas, Parker McCormick
May 7, 1951	"The Lost Will of Dr. Rant"	Leslie Nielsen, Russell Collins, Pat Englund, Eva Condon, John Gerstad, Marvin Paige, Florence Anguish, Fred Ardath
May 14, 1951	"Dead Man's Coat"	Basil Rathbone, William Post Jr., Norman Rose, Heywood Hale Broun, Harvey Hays, Pat Donovan
April 7, 1952	"The Pit and the Pendulum"	Murvyn Vye
April 21, 1952	"A Lucky Piece"	Adelaide Klein, Henry Jones, Oliver Thorndike, Abe Simon, Stephen Gray
September 29, 1952	"The Hollow Man"	William Bendix

== Production ==
Lights Out was broadcast live. Initially it was on Tuesdays from 9 to 9:30 p.m. Eastern Time. In November 1949 it was moved to Mondays from 9 to 9:30 p.m. E. T., and it remained in that time slot. Sponsors included Admiral Corporation, Ennds chlorophyll tablets, and Eye-Gene eye drops.

Engineers at NBC developed a "newly perfected" split-screen technology for use on the series. The New York Times reported, "The new development, it is said, makes it possible for the first time to maintain continuity of action, including scene change, on both sides of the screen ..." Other effects used on the series included the first-person camera approach, an amorphous shadow, people walking through walls, and vanishing spirits.

Visual elements of the show were supplemented by musical effects. Arlo Hults played an organ throughout the show's run. In 1949 Paul Lipman played a theremin, and from 1950 through 1952, Doris Johnson played a harp.

Herbert Swope Jr. and Fred Coe were the producers. Directors included William Corrigan and Kingman T. Moore. Don Pike was the technical director. Writers included Ernest Kinoy, Douglas Wood Gibson, Douglas Gilbert and James Lee.

Authors whose works were adapted for the program included Edgar Allan Poe, John J. MacDonald, Gerald Kersch, Dorothy L. Sayers, and Harry Junkin.

Coe staged a pre-broadcast performance of the initial episode a week before the show's on-air premiere. The episode was recorded via kinescope and evaluated to determine possible changes. Two scenes were cut before the broadcast, and the opening and ending were revised.

== Critical response ==
A review in The New York Times contained praise for the program's third episode, "Long Distance". Val Adams wrote that the broadcast had "memorable effect" and called Jan Miner's acting "a sterling performance". The review focused on the episode's use of a split-screen technique that enabled viewers to see and hear both ends of multiple telephone conversations as the wife of a condemned man tried to find a judge who would intervene to prevent her husband's execution. Adams wrote that the technique "underscored anew video's possibilities when motivated by imagination tempered with common sense."

Another review in the Times found a May 1952 episode of Lights Out less impressive. Jack Gould summarized a plot that "fell on its supernatural ... It tried to put mind over matter and found itself only holding a jar of chlorophyll tablets."

A review of the episode "Dr. Heidegger's Experiment" in the trade publication Billboard noted that it had "little suspense or impact in the script." The review said that Burke and Gene Lockhart performed well, but "the supporting players, generally, delivered wooden performances, and the omnipresent organ made far too much commotion at times."

Bob Goddard wrote in the St. Louis Globe-Democrat that the TV version of Lights Out was "mild by comparison" to its radio counterpart. "At its peak moments," Goddard said, the TV show "barely ruffled me", whereas the radio program "scared the socks off of you". He attributed the different impacts to video's leaving little to the imagination. With radio, in contrast, "You hear a moan or a clank of a ghostly chain and you can conjure up all manner of ghastly sights." Goddard also criticized the placement of the first commercial after LaRue had set the tone for the episode in the opening. Goddard suggested beginning with the commercial, then having LaRue's opening lead directly into the story.

== Preservation ==
The episode "The House of Dust" was preserved by the UCLA Film & Television Archive from a 16mm composite kinescope. Preservation funding was provided by the John H. Mitchell Television Preservation Endowment. The preserved episode screened at the 2024 UCLA Festival of Preservation.
