= Stanley Leonard =

American musician and educator (born 1931)

Stanley Sprenger Leonard (born September 26, 1931) is a timpanist, composer and educator. He was principal timpanist for the Pittsburgh Symphony Orchestra from 1956 to 1994. As a solo artist, he premiered several major new works for solo timpani and orchestra with the Pittsburgh Symphony Orchestra. When William Steinberg retired as music director of the Pittsburgh Symphony the Pittsburgh Post Gazette of May 21, 1976 quoted Steinberg in an article as saying ".....Stanley Leonard, Pittsburgh's first timpanist. He is such a fabulous figure, the number one man in the orchestra. He is not just a tympanist, he is the embodiment of tympanum playing." In 2010, he was inducted into the Percussive Arts Society Hall of Fame.

He has composed more than 206 pieces for percussion instruments. His compositions for percussion, voice, choral, piano, violin, and handbells are listed in "An Annotated Bibliography of Percussion Works by Stanley Leonard." He also wrote method books, including Pedal Technique for the Timpani.

Leonard taught percussion at Carnegie Mellon University from 1958 to 1978, and then at Duquesne University from 1989 to 2001.

His music and recordings are cataloged and archived at the Sibley Music Library of the Eastman School of Music. (See External Links below).

Stanley Leonard’s percussion oeuvre occupies a distinctive position within late 20th century and early 21st-century American percussion literature, shaped by his long tenure as principal timpanist of the Pittsburgh Symphony Orchestra and by a compositional philosophy rooted in orchestral practice rather than experimental percussion aesthetics. His works demonstrate a synthesis of instrumental idiom, structural clarity, and expressive intent, revealing a composer who approached percussion not as a novelty medium but as a fully capable vehicle for musical discourse.

== Career timeline ==
1943–1949

Studied snare drum and marimba with Vera McNary Daehlin of the Kansas City Philharmonic

1945-1950

Performed timpani with the Independence Little Symphony

1946-1949

Studied timpani with Ben Udell of the Kansas City Philharmonic

1948–1950

Performed as percussionist with the Kansas City Philharmonic, Hans Schwieger, Music Director

1950–1951

Studied timpani with Edward Metzinger of the Chicago Symphony and Northwestern University

1951-1954

Studied percussion and timpani with William Street of the Eastman School of Music. Graduated 1954, Bachelor of Music, Performers Certificate in Percussion

1953-1954

Performed as percussionist with the Rochester Philharmonic, Erich Leinsdorf, Music Director

1952–1954

Charter member of Eastman Wind Ensemble, percussionist then timpanist; made first two recordings of the Eastman Wind Ensemble, Frederick Fennell, Conductor

1955–1956

Timpanist with the 19th Army Band; performed on ABC network series Soldier Parade with Arlene Francis and twice on the Ed Sullivan Show

1956-1994

Principal Timpanist Pittsburgh Symphony Orchestra
Music Directors: 1956-1976 William Steinberg, 1976-1984 Andre Previn, 1985-1994 Lorin Maazel
- Made national and international tours
- Made over fifty recordings for Capitol, Columbia, Philips, Angel, Command, Everest, and Sony; one received a Grammy Award (Maazel) and one a Gramophone Award, UK, (Previn)
- Appeared in the television series on PBS: Previn and the Pittsburgh Symphony Orchestra
- Made five solo appearances:

Date	Composer	Title of composition	Conductor
1958	Milhaud	"Concerto for Percussion and Small Orchestra"	Steinberg
1964	Tharichen	"Concerto for Timpani and Orchestra" (American premier)	Steinberg
1973	McCulloh	"Symphony Concertante for Timpanist and Orchestra" (world premier)	Johanos
1981	Panufnik	"Concertino for Timpani, Percussion, and Strings" (American premier)	Previn
1984	Premru	"Celebrations" (world premier)	Previn

== Discography ==
On the CDs Canticle, Collage, Acclamation, and Reunion, Leonard directs and performs his compositions for percussion. Retrospections features his music and music by Brett W. Dietz. All CDs are available through the Sibley Music Library. Also directly from Stanley Leonard at www.StanleyLeonard.com

- Canticle (1995) — Duquesne University Alumni Percussion Ensemble, Stanley Leonard
- Collage (2007) — Hamiruge Percussion Group Louisiana State University, Stanley Leonard
- Acclamation (2010) — Stanley Leonard, Timpani, James Cochran, Organ, Matthew Sonneborn, Trumpet
- Reunion (2012) — Tempus Fugit Percussion Ensemble, Hamiruge Percussion Group, Stanley Leonard
- Jubilate (2015) — Three Rivers Ringers Handbell Ensemble
- Retrospections (2020) — Hamiruge Percussion Group Louisiana State University, Stanley Leonard

== Compositions for percussion music ==
=== Etude and method books ===
- Contemporary Album for Snare Drum (1986) LudwigMasters Publications
- Forty Hymns and Carols for Timpani (2002) PerMus Publications
- Four Duets for Timpani (2014) Alfred Music
- Orchestral Repertoire for the Timpani. An Introduction (1997) LudwigMasters Publications
- Pedal Technique for the Timpani (1988) LudwigMasters Publications
- Seventeen Technical Studies for Timpani (2014) Alfred Music
- The Timpani: Music and Mechanics (2000) Stanley S. Leonard
- Twelve Solo Etudes for the Advanced Timpanist (2015) Alfred Music

=== Unaccompanied timpani solos ===
- "Canticle" (1972) LudwigMasters Publications
- "Collage for Solo Timpani" (2009) C. Alan Publications
- "Danza" (2014) Bachovich Music Publications
- "Doubles" (1995) LudwigMasters Publications
- "Echoes of Seven" (2012) Mostly MarImba Music Publications
- "Echoes of Eight" (2014) Alfred Music
- "Echoes of Nine" (2002) LudwigMasters Publications
- "Flashback" (2023) C. Alan Publications
- "Forms" (1986) LudwigMasters Publications
- "Madras" (1981) Bachovich Music Publications
- "March and Scherzo" (2010) Bachovich Music Publications
- "Solo Dialogue for Four Timpani and Three Tom Toms" (1991) LudwigMasters Publications
- "Solus, with Multiple Percussion" (2000) RowLoff Productions

=== Timpani solo with other instruments ===
- "Canto for Solo Timpani and Trombone" (2004) Stanley S. Leonard
- "Canto II for Solo Timpani and French Horn" (2007) Stanley S. Leonard
- "Concertino for Timpani and Keyboard Percussion Ensemble" (1996) LudwigMasters Publications
- "Duetto Concertino for Timpani and French Horn" (1995) LudwigMasters Publications
- "Fanfare and Allegro for Solo Timpani and Trumpet" (1974) Boosey and Hawkes
- "Recitative and Scherzo for Solo Timpani and Percussion Ensemble" (2007) C. Alan Publications
- "Rhythmix for Solo Timpani and Percussion Quartet" (2015) C. Alan Publications

=== Timpani duos ===
- "Duo for Two Timpanists" (1997) LudwigMasters Publications
- "Duologue" (2012) Bachovich Publications
- "Four Duets for Timpani" (2014) Alfred Music
- "Pairs" (2001) Rowloff Productions

=== Timpani and organ and other instruments ===
- "Alleluia" (2003) C. Alan Publications
- "Ballad and Dance with Flute" (2013) Stanley S. Leonard
- "Celebration Hymn" (2005) Stanley S. Leonard
- "Easter Fanfare with Trumpet" (2009) Stanley S. Leonard
- "Easter Prologue with Trumpet" (2012) Stanley S. Leonard
- "Fanfare and Celebrations" (2018) Stanley S. Leonard
- "Fantasia on Luther’s Hymn" (2003) C. Alan Publications
- "Fantasia on St. Denio" (2007) Stanley S. Leonard
- "He Is Risen with Trumpet" (2005) PerMus Publications
- "Hornpipe" G. F. Handel, arranged by S. Leonard (2010) Stanley S. Leonard
- "Hymn of Joy" (2010) Stanley S. Leonard
- "In Dulci Jubilo" (2009) Stanley S. Leonard
- "O Come Emmanuel" (2005) PerMus Publications
- "Praise Ye The Lord" (2010) Stanley S. Leonard
- "Prelude" (2014) Stanley S. Leonard
- "Prelude on an Ancient Hymn with Flugelhorn" (2015) Stanley S. Leonard
- "The Rejoicing" G. F. Handel, arranged by S. Leonard (2010) Stanley S. Leonard
- "Theme and Variations" (2011) Stanley S. Leonard
- "Voluntary with Trumpet" (2003) Stanley S. Leonard

=== Percussion solos unaccompanied ===
- "Choirs" (2001) Alfred Music
- "Cascades" (2012) Stanley S. Leonard
- "Sonnet" (1978) Stanley S. Leonard
- "Ubique" (1970) Stanley S. Leonard

=== Percussion with other instruments ===
- "Collage with Flute" (1972) Stanley S. Leonard
- "On That Day with Organ" (1972) Stanley S. Leonard
- "Shadows with Keyboard Percussion Ensemble" (2006) C. Alan Publications
- "Triptych with organ, One Brass Instrument and Reader" (1970) Stanley S. Leonard
- "Will O' The Wisp with Bass Clarinet/Clarinet" (2005) Stanley S. Leonard

=== Two percussionists ===
- "Continuum" (1968) Stanley S. Leonard
- "Duales" (2014) Stanley S. Leonard.
- "Pairs" (2001) Rowloff Productions

=== Keyboard percussion ensemble ===
- "Ballade" (2018) LudwigMasters Publications
- "Four Canons" (1958) LudwigMasters Publications
- "Fanfares and Celebration (2022) Stanley S. Leonard
- "Masquerade" (Waltz)" (1974) Stanley S. Leonard
- "Mirror Canon" (1976) Boosey and Hawkes.
- "Mirrors" (2012) Mostly Marimba Publications
- "Prelude for Four Marimbas" (1972) LudwigMasters Publications
- "Processional" (1997) Stanley S. Leonard
- "Quarimba" (1995) LudwigMasters Publications
- "Rise Up O Flame" (1970) Stanley S. Leonard
- "Scherzo" (1975) Stanley S. Leonard
- "Serenade" (1997) LudwigMasters Publications
- "Two Contemporary Scenes" (1968) Stanley S. Leonard

=== Percussion ensemble ===
==== Three players ====
- "Three Spaces" (1969) Stanley S. Leonard
- "Trilogy" (2019) Stanley S. Leonard
- "Trioso" (2003) C. Alan Publications

==== Four players ====
- "Bachiana for percussion" (1974) Boosey and Hawkes
- "Cycle for Percussion" (1969) Stanley S. Leonard
- "Dance Suite" (1969) Stanley S. Leonard
- "Four to Seven" (2023) Stanley S. Leonard
- "Housemusic for Percussion" (1968) Stanley S. Leonard.
- "Kiwi" (2022) with optional fifth player Stanley S. Leonard
- "Reflections" (2023) Stanley S. Leonard
- "Telin-Ting" (1974) Stanley S. Leonard
- "Time and Space" (2019) Stanley S. Leonard

==== Five players ====
- "Beachwalk" (1997) LudwigMasters Publications
- "Circus" (1972) LudwigMasters Publications
- "Closing Piece" (1969) Stanley S. Leonard
- "Low Bridge" (2023) Stanley S. Leonard
- "Metonymy" (2025) Stanley S. Leonard
- "Presenting Percussion" (2007) PerMus Publications
- "The Advancing Gong" (1971) Stanley S. Leonard
- "Three Rivers" (2012) Stanley S. Leonard
- "Tupinam" (2022) Stanley S. Leonard
- "Winged Chariot" (2003) C. Alan Publications
- "Word Games II" (1973) Stanley S. Leonard

==== Six players ====
- "Chapoka" (2025) Stanley S. Leonard
- "Descant" (2023) C. Alan Publications
- "Danza Bamboo" (2016) C. Alan Publications
- "Four Images" (1978) LudwigMasters Publications
- "Marche" (2001) RowLoff productions
- "Promenade" (1997) LudwigMasters Publications
- "Ritmicas" (2026) Stanley S. Leonard
- "The Gathering" (2021) Stanley S. Leonard
- "Zanza" (2003) Stanley S. Leonard

==== Seven players ====
- "Heptades" (2024) Stanley S. Leonard
- "Interiors" (2017) Stanley S. Leonard
- "Journeys" (2022) Stanley S. Leonard
- "Neves" (2026) Stanley S. Leonard
- "Metalliques" (2022) Stanley S. Leonard
- "Refractions" (2025) Stanley S. Leonard
- "Sacred Stones" (2004) C. Alan Publications

==== Eight players ====
- "Antiphonies" (2000) RowLoff Productions
- "Encounters" (2019) Stanley S. Leonard
- "Ex Machina" (2000) RowLoff productions
- "Etowah" (2020) Stanley S. Leonard
- "Fanfare, Meditation, and Dance" (1982) Stanley S. Leonard
- "Main Street" (2017) LudwigMasters Publications
- "Rituals" (2023) Stanley S. Leonard
- "Pickerington" (2022) Stanley S. Leonard
- "Six Bagatelles" (2011) C. Alan Publications
- "Stickometry"(2023) Stanley S. Leonard

==== Nine players ====
- "Dream" (2020) Stanley S. Leonard
- "Kymbalon" (2006) C. Alan Publications
- "Symphony for Percussion" (2009) RowLoff Productions.

==== Ten players ====
- "Skies" (2000) RowLoff Productions
- "Traveling Music" (2013) LudwigMasters Publications
- "Voices" (2011) Stanley S. Leonard

==== Eleven Players ====
- "Palindrome" (2023) Stanley S. Leonard

==== Twelve players ====
- "Festival Fanfare" (2001) Stanley S. Leonard

==== Thirteen Players ====
- "Drum Celebration" (2022) Alfred Music

==== Fourteen players ====
- "Hurricane" (2006) C. Alan Publications
- "Janissary Band" (2011) C. Alan Publications
- "Retrospections Fanfare" (2013) Stanley S. Leonard

=== Percussion ensemble with other instruments or voice ===
- "Good Christian Men Rejoice" (2000) Handbells RowLoff Productions
- "Winter Fantasy" (2000) Handbells Rowloff Productions
