= Adelaide Klein =

American actress (1900–1983)

- Klein in the 1930s
- Born: July 8, 1900; New York City, U.S.
- Died: March 18, 1983 (aged 82)
- Education: Julia Richman High School
- Occupation: Actress
- Years active: 1929–1948
- Known for: The Naked City; Two Girls Named Smith; Terry and the Pirates

Adelaide Klein (July 8, 1900–March 18, 1983) was an American actress who performed on radio, television, films, and the stage. She was best known for her dialects as a radio performer. Over the course of her thirty-year career, Klein performed in radio comedies and soap operas, appeared in eight shows on Broadway, four films, and on thirteen television series.

== Early life ==
Klein was born in New York City on July 8, 1900. While she attended Julia Richman High School, she prepared for a career in business but also was exposed to drama. After graduation, she began working as a secretary.

== Career ==
Klein began her radio as a singer in the late 1920s. However, demand for her talents with dialect and as a character actress led her to acting full-time by 1933. She performed in a variety of radio programs, including portraying Hilda, the maid in We, The Abbotts, Dragon Lady in Terry and the Pirates, Agatha Meek in Meet Mr. Meek, and a Russian countess in The House on Q Street. She also was heard in Sometime Before Morning. Klein mastered use of 12 dialects in radio performances.

Klein performed in a USO production of Blithe Spirit during World War II. Broadway shows in which she appeared included Double Dummy (1936), Brooklyn, U.S.A. (1941), Uncle Harry (1942), Collector's Item (1952), The Immoralist (1954), Once Upon a Tailor (1955), Jane Eyre (1958), and Marathon '33 (1963). Her film credits included The Naked City (1948) and The Enforcer (1951). She was signed to play the role of Martha in director Otto Preminger's Where the Sidewalk Ends and scenes were shot in New York City, but the role was ultimately played by another actress.

On television, Klein portrayed the landlady on the situation comedy Two Girls Named Smith (1951). She also had roles on other TV shows, including The Boris Karloff Mystery Playhouse (1949), Studio One in Hollywood (1949), The Ford Theatre Hour (1950), and The Philco-Goodyear Television Playhouse (1950).

== Blacklist ==
In the mid-1940s, Klein was active in the American Federation of Radio Artists (AFRA) and served as a delegate for New York at national conferences in 1943 and 1944. Klein was one of 56 delegates for New York at national conferences in 1943 and 1944, where she worked with others, including Donna Keath, Minerva Pious, Ann Shepherd, Selena Royle, and Hester Sondergaard.

Along with Keath, Pious, Shepherd, Royle, Sondergaard, Klein was listed in the blacklisting publication, Red Channels: The Report of Communist Influence in Radio and Television in 1950. She continued to perform in theatre, but television roles dried up as a consequence of Klein being labelled a communist.

== Personal life ==
Klein married Louis S. Wettels in Manhattan in the late 1920s. She later married Norman Annenberg. Klein died of a brain tumor on March 18, 1983, at the age of 82.

== Filmography ==
Film
| Year | Title | Role | Notes |
|---|---|---|---|
| 1948 | The Naked City | Mrs. Batory | |
| 1949 | C-Man | Minnie Hoffman | |
| 1951 | The Enforcer | Olga Kirshen | |
| 1964 | The Troublemaker | Psychiatrist | (final film role) |
Television
| Year | Title | Role | Notes |
| 1949 | Suspense | Mrs. Broder | Episode: "Collector's Item" |
| 1949 | The Big Story | | Episode: "Frank Shenkel of the Pittsburgh Sun Telegraph" |
| 1949 | The Boris Karloff Mystery Playhouse | | Episode: "Mad Illusion" |
| 1949 | Studio One in Hollywood | Mrs. Bruhl / Psychotic Woman | 2 episodes |
| 1949-1951 | The Clock | | 2 episodes |
| 1950 | The Ford Theatre Hour | Maw | Episode: "The Barker" |
| 1950 | The Philco-Goodyear Television Playhouse | | Episode: "The End Is Known" |
| 1950 | Hands of Mystery | | 2 episodes |
| 1950 | The Web | | Episode: "Blessed Are the Meek" |
| 1951 | Two Girls Named Smith | Landlady | Episode: "Premier" |
| 1951 | Somerset Maugham TV Theatre | | Episode: "Appearances and Reality" |
| 1951-1952 | Lights Out | Mrs. Manifold | 2 episodes |
| 1958 | Decoy | Mrs. Kramer | Episode: "The Lost Ones" |

== Broadway ==
- Double Dummy (November 11, 1936 – December 1936)
- Brooklyn, U.S.A. (December 21, 1941 – February 7, 1942)
- Uncle Harry (May 20, 1942 – May 9, 1943)
- Collector’s Item (February 8, 1952 – February 9, 1952)
- The Immoralist (February 8, 1954 – May 1, 1954)
- Once Upon A Tailor (May 23, 1955 – May 28, 1955)
- Jane Eyre (May 1, 1958 – June 14, 1958)
- Marathon ‘33 (December 22, 1963 – February 1, 1964)
