= Behind the Rising Sun (film) =

1943 film by Edward Dmytryk

- Film poster
- Directed by: Edward Dmytryk
- Written by: Emmet Lavery
- Based on: Behind the Rising Sun by James R. Young
- Produced by: Edward Dmytryk; Howard Hughes
- Starring: Margo; Tom Neal; J. Carrol Naish; Robert Ryan; Gloria Holden
- Cinematography: Russell Metty
- Edited by: Joseph Noriega
- Music by: Roy Webb
- Distributed by: RKO Pictures
- Release date: August 1, 1943
- Running time: 88 minutes
- Country: United States
- Languages: English; Japanese
- Budget: US$239,000
- Box office: $1.5 million (US rentals)

Behind the Rising Sun is a 1943 American war film based on the 1941 book Behind the Rising Sun written by James R. Young. Later-blacklisted Edward Dmytryk directed the film, and it stars Margo, Tom Neal, J. Carrol Naish, Robert Ryan and Gloria Holden.

== Plot ==
In 1943, Reo Seki is presented with the ashes of his dead son, Taro Seki. He blames himself for his son's death.

Back in 1936, at the time of the February 26 incident, Taro Seki returns to Japan after studying in America, with plans to work for an American engineer, Clancy O'Hara. Taro falls in love with Clancy's secretary, Tama Shimamura and they plan to marry. His father does not accept their marriage because Tama is not from a respectable family. Taro is then drafted to the war in China. Tama and Taro write frequent letters to each other and Tama attempts to show Reo Seki all the letters Taro has sent but he refuses to see them or have anything to do with his son.

Meanwhile, in China, Taro experiences the brutality of war and witnesses the cruelty of the Japanese to the poor in China. He is told to accept it by a higher-ranked officer. Sara Braden is an American reporter in China as well as Clancy O'Hara's girlfriend, and she complains to Taro about the violence that the Japanese soldiers are showing towards others. Taro, remembering what the higher-ranked officer had told him, shrugs it off. Outraged, Sara tells him that the war has changed him.

Tama and Reo receive news that Taro is coming home and arrange for a celebration with Clancy, Boris and Max. When Taro arrives, he is different. Reo explains that he has arranged for Tama to be adopted into a respectable family and will allow them to marry. But then, Sara comes in and tells everyone about the children that Taro let die in China to which Tama is in shock. Clancy comments on the Japanese which angers Taro and he demands a fight. They both choose a proxy; Clancy brings American Lefty O'Doyle and Taro chooses a Japanese judo expert. Lefty O'Doyle wins and the judo wrestler is killed for the shame he has brought on the Emperor. Clancy warns Tama that Sara was right, Taro has changed but she has arranged an outing to the countryside to see her parents for the last time before her adoption.

When they arrive in the countryside, Tama finds out that her younger sister has been sold in order for her parents to attain more money for Tama and her wedding. Tama begs for Taro to buy back her younger sister and he agrees. Reo warns Clancy that he should leave Japan immediately and return to America because he knows that they will attack Pearl Harbor. Back in the countryside, Taro has now heard news of the attack on Pearl Harbor and the Emperor's call to all his men and leaves the country home. Tama asks if he will save her sister in Tokyo but he replies that there is no time for personal issues when the Emperor is in their need and that her sister was a noble sacrifice. Tama returns to Tokyo in search of her sister but is taken to prison under suspicion of being a spy for working under Clancy. A year later, Taro, now in the air corps regiment, testifies against Tama, Clancy and Sara saying that he was "suspicious of them from the first time he met them". Soon after, Clancy proposes to Sara and there is an American bombing raid on Tokyo in which Reo attempts to save Tama, Clancy and Sara but Tama refuses at last minute. At the same time, Taro's plane is hit and he dies.

The film ends back in 1943. Reo repudiates the Emperor and then commits suicide through seppuku/hara-kiri (stomach cutting) in hope that his own death will bring the people of Japan back to their senses.

== Cast ==
- Margo as Tama Shimamura
- Tom Neal as Taro Seki
- J. Carrol Naish as Reo Seki
- Robert Ryan as Lefty O'Doyle
- Gloria Holden as Sara Braden
- Donald Douglas as Clancy O'Hara (as Don Douglas)
- George Givot as Boris
- Adeline De Walt Reynolds as Grandmother
- Leonard Strong as Tama's Father

== Production ==
The film was from the writer and director of Hitler's Children which had been a huge success. Edward Dmytryk wrote "We bought a book for its title... Then we concocted a story based largely on incidents as they had been reported from the Orient before Pearl Harbor. For example: The slapping of American women, the dispersal of opium to Chinese to keep them docile, etc. On a not very original plot, we strung ten or twelve incidents calculated to increase the flow of patriotic juices. It worked. This one was a little more expensive — $250,000 (fake eyelids don’t come cheap) — and the film returned some $5,000,000. No Hitler’s Children, but still a tidy profit."

At one stage the film was known as The Mad Brood of Japan.

A writer RKO's John Tynan, claimed RKO breached copyright in his story, Yank Meets Jap in Fight to Finish, in producing the film.

== Reception ==
Variety said it "should hit hefty grosses".

The film was enormously popular and earned RKO a profit of $1.48 million.
