= All About Faces =

Television game show, 1971–1972

- Genre: Game show
- Created by: Dan Enright
- Presented by: Richard Hayes
- Countries of origin: United States; Canada
- No. of seasons: 1

Production
- Producer: Screen Gems
- Production locations: CFTO-TV; Toronto, Ontario, Canada

Original release
- Network: Syndicated; CTV Television Network
- Release: August 30, 1971 – September 1972

All About Faces is a weekly game show which ran from August 30, 1971, to September 1972. The series incorporated a "hidden camera" format similar to Candid Camera. The program was produced in Toronto by Screen Gems, at the studios of CFTO-TV in Scarborough, Toronto, Ontario. Richard Hayes was host, and the show's producer was Dan Enright. The show was short-lived, lasting only one season in U.S. television syndication and on Canada's CTV.

== Format ==
Two teams, each consisting of a celebrity and a friend or relative, would be shown a clip of an unsuspecting person placed in an embarrassing situation, recorded by a hidden camera, and as the film was frozen on a closeup of the person's face, the contestants had to wager on how the person would react. For example, a person in a taxicab is told by the driver that he is nearsighted and color blind; the contestants would guess whether the passenger would exit the cab or not. Each team started with $50 and could bet up to that amount in each round; the team with the most money after four rounds won the game, with their winnings donated to their favorite charity (and if the team's final score was under $50, they would still be credited with said amount).

== Broadcast history ==
The show was produced in Toronto. The show is a derivative of the 1961 ABC show About Faces. This was one of several Canadian game shows Dan Enright worked on following his post-quiz show scandals exile; he would later make a comeback to American game shows when former partner Jack Barry brought him in to produce the final network season of Barry's own successful comeback series, The Joker's Wild.

The show was adapted into the 1972 CBS series The Amateur's Guide to Love. The format of guessing the outcome of a "hidden camera" video would subsequently be reused in two later game shows, Anything for Money and Hold Everything!.

== Reception ==
Variety reviewer Bill praised All About Faces, writing, "The show has a rapid pace, what with the number of situations presented in each half hour, and a beneficial comedic spontaneity via ad lib aspects by the actors on location. The intriguing twist of the audience being in on something the subject isn't, works here as it did in Candid Camera. Host Richard Hayes suits the comedy format nicely." Newsday television critic Marvin Kitman called the show "uninspired nonsense" that "dup[ed] people into doing silly things which degrade human foibles", writing that it "began competing for the title of the most idiotic games show last August". The author Alex McNeil called All About Faces a "lackluster game show".
