= Margo (actress) =

Mexican actress (1917–1985)

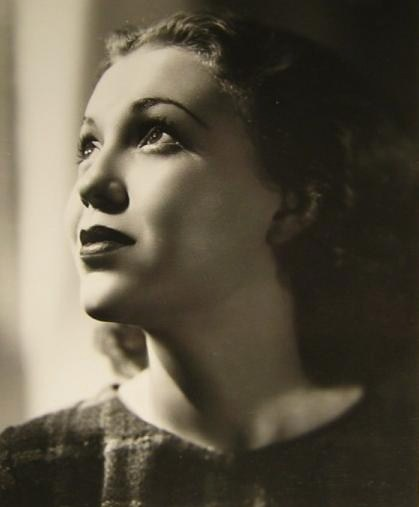
- Margo in 1936
- Born: María Margarita Guadalupe Teresa Estela Bolado Castilla y O'Donnell; May 10, 1917; Mexico City, Mexico
- Died: July 17, 1985 (aged 68); Pacific Palisades, California, U.S.
- Resting place: Westwood Village Memorial Park Cemetery, U.S.
- Other names: Margo Albert; Margarita Alonso y Castilla; Margo Bolado
- Occupations: Actress, dancer
- Years active: 1934–1965
- Spouses: Francis Lederer (m. 1937; div. 1940) Eddie Albert (m. 1945)
- Children: 2; Including Edward

Margo (born María Margarita Guadalupe Teresa Estela Bolado Castilla y O'Donnell, May 10, 1917 – July 17, 1985) was a Mexican actress and dancer. She appeared in many film, stage, and television productions, including Lost Horizon (1937), The Leopard Man (1943), Viva Zapata! (1952), and I'll Cry Tomorrow (1955). She married actor Eddie Albert in 1945 and was later known as Margo Albert.

== Early life and career ==
Margo was born into a musically talented family in Mexico City in 1917. As a child, she trained as a dancer with Eduardo Cansino, the father of Rita Hayworth. At the age of nine, she began dancing professionally with her uncle Xavier Cugat and his band in performances at Mexican nightclubs.

Margo travelled to the United States as a child, living in New York City with her aunt, singer Carmen Castillo. While accompanying her uncle's band during a performance at the Waldorf Astoria in New York City, Margo was noticed by producer and director Ben Hecht and screenwriter Charles MacArthur, who cast the 17-year-old performer as the lead in their film Crime Without Passion. Margo also played the character of Miriamne Esdras both on stage and in the 1936 film version of Winterset, which one critic called a "cinemagoer's must". Other notable roles in the 1930s include parts in the 1937 film Lost Horizon and Broadway productions of Maxwell Anderson's Masque of Kings (1937) and Sidney Kingsley's The World We Make (1939).

== Blacklisting ==
While Margo continued to act in films until the 1960s, her career was curtailed by the television blacklist that began in 1950, with the targeting of Gypsy Rose Lee, Jean Muir, Hazel Scott, and Ireene Wicker. Margo held progressive political views, but she was not a member of the Communist Party. In 1950, her name and that of her husband, Eddie Albert, were published in Red Channels, an anti-Communist pamphlet that purported to expose Communist influence within the entertainment industry. Red Channels labeled her a communist because of her support for the Hollywood Ten, her advocacy for peace, and her support for refugees.

In 1964, she played the role of Selena in the Rawhide episode "A Man Called Mushy".

Albert's son spoke of his parents' blacklisting in an interview published in December 1972, crediting Albert's service during World War II with ultimately saving his career.

My mom was blacklisted for appearing at an anti-Franco rally; she was branded a Communist, was spat upon in the streets, and had to have a bodyguard. And my dad found himself unemployable at several major studios, just when his career was gathering momentum. During the second World War, dad joined the Navy and saw action at Tarawa, and because he came back something of a hero, he was able to get work again. But he never got as far as he should have gotten.

Eddie Albert's film career survived the blacklist, but Margo was blacklisted by the major Hollywood studios.

== Arts activism and engagement ==
In the years after the blacklist, Margo pursued her advocacy for arts and education. In 1970, along with Frank Lopez, a trade union activist, Margo founded Plaza de la Raza (Place of the People) in East Los Angeles. A cultural center for arts and education, Plaza de la Raza remains in operation today, providing year-round programming in arts education. Her work with Plaza de la Raza included serving as the artistic director and as chairwoman of the board. Albert's commitment to the arts extended beyond her work in East Los Angeles: she served as a steering committee member on the President's Committee on the Arts and Humanities and was a member of the board of the National Council of the National Endowment for the Arts.

== Personal life ==
Margo was married twice. In 1937, she wed actor Francis Lederer, but they divorced in 1940. In December 1945, three years after she became a naturalized citizen of the United States, she married actor Eddie Albert. She and Albert had two children, a son (actor Edward Albert) and an adopted daughter (Maria Carmen Zucht, who served as her father's business manager). The couple were married for 40 years, until 1985 when she died from brain cancer at age 68 in their home in Pacific Palisades, California.

== Stage work ==
- September 25, 1935 – March 1936: Winterset
- February 8, 1937 – April 24, 1937: The Masque of Kings
- November 20, 1939 – January 27, 1940: The World We Make
- February 4, 1941 – February 23, 1941: Tanyard Street
- December 6, 1944 – October 27, 1945: A Bell for Adano

== Filmography ==
This filmography of theatrical features is believed to be complete.

- 1934: Crime Without Passion
- 1935: Rumba
- 1936: The Robin Hood of El Dorado
- 1936: Winterset
- 1937: Lost Horizon
- 1939: Miracle on Main Street
- 1943: The Leopard Man
- 1943: Behind the Rising Sun
- 1943: Gangway for Tomorrow
- 1952: Viva Zapata! as Soldadera
- 1955: I'll Cry Tomorrow as Selma
- 1957: Wagon Train as Mrs. John Darro
- 1957: Mambo Girl
- 1958: From Hell to Texas as Mrs. Bradley
- 1962: Who's Got the Action? as Roza
- 1965: Rawhide as Selena
- 1970: Diary of a Mad Housewife as Valma

== See also ==
- List of women identified as communists in Red Channels
