= Peggy Ann Garner =

American child actress (1932–1984)

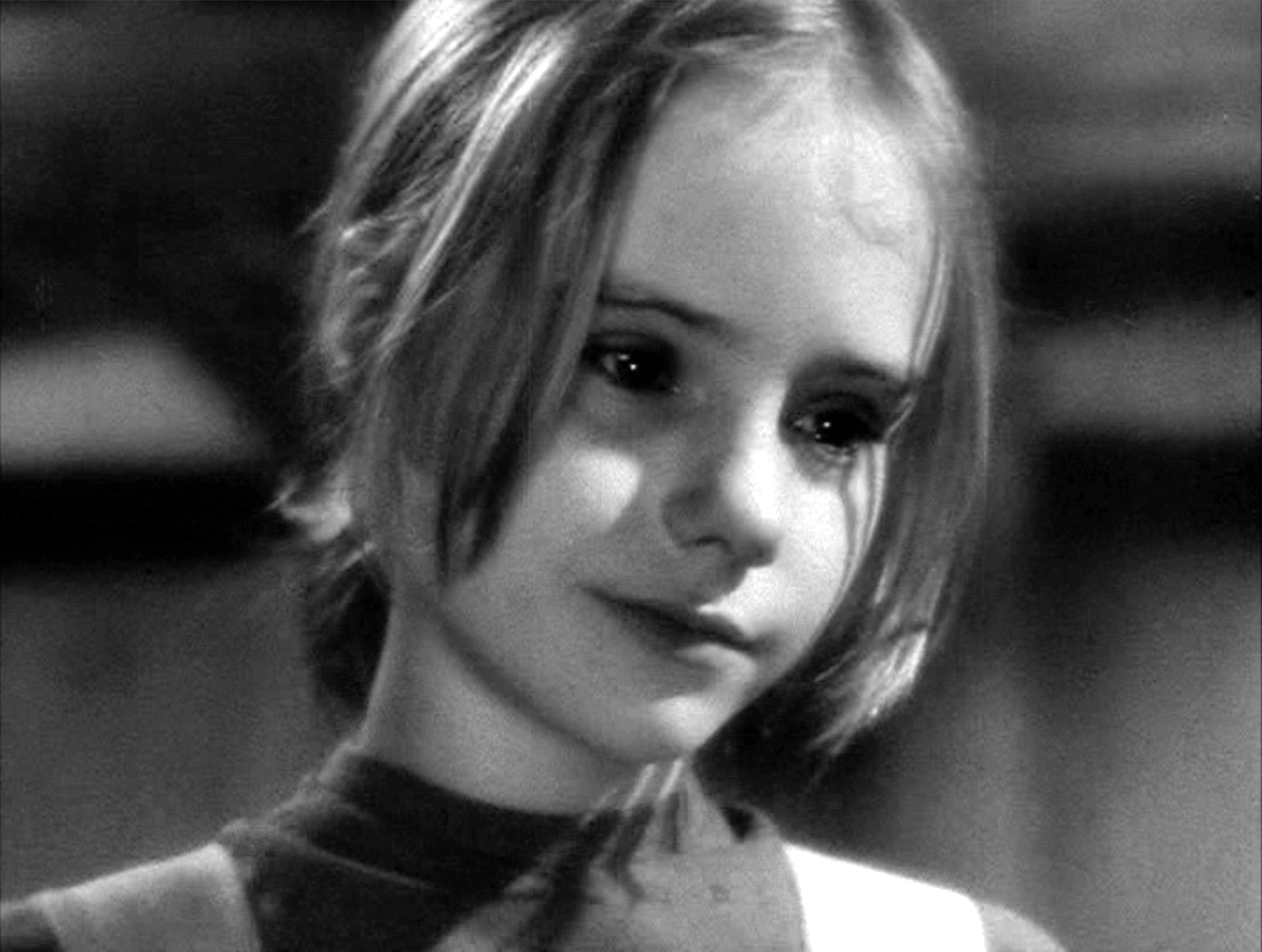
- Garner in Jane Eyre (1943)
- Born: February 3, 1932; Canton, Ohio, U.S.
- Died: October 16, 1984 (aged 52); Woodland Hills, California, U.S.
- Occupations: Actress; real estate agent; fleet car executive
- Years active: 1938–1980
- Spouses: Richard Hayes (m. 1951; div. 1953) Albert Salmi (m. 1956; div. 1963) Kenyon Foster Brown (m. 1964; div. 1968)
- Children: 1

Peggy Ann Garner (February 3, 1932 – October 16, 1984) was an American actress.

As a child actress, Garner had her first film role in 1938. At the 18th Academy Awards in 1946, Garner won the Academy Juvenile Award, recognizing her body of contributions to film in 1945, particularly in A Tree Grows in Brooklyn and Junior Miss.

Featured roles in such films as Black Widow (1954) did not help to establish her in mature film roles, although she progressed to theatrical work and she made acting appearances on television as an adult.

== Early years ==
Peggy Ann Garner was born on February 3, 1932, at Aultman Hospital in Canton, Ohio. She was the daughter of William H. Garner, an attorney, and Virginia Craig Garner; they were married in Toledo, Ohio on April 7, 1931. She attended University High School in Los Angeles. She was pushed by her mother into the limelight and entered in talent quests while still a child. Her parents divorced on February 26, 1947.

Garner was a child model for still photographers for two years before she began working in films in 1938.

== Film ==
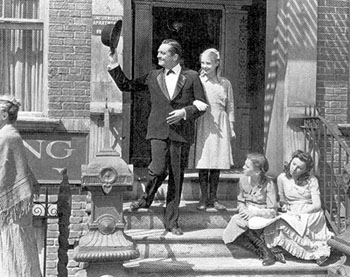
James Dunn and Peggy Ann Garner in A Tree Grows in Brooklyn (1945)

In 1938, Garner made her first film appearance at the age of six in the Warner Bros. film Little Miss Thoroughbred (1939), in which she had a small role as an orphan. Over the next few years, she continued to appear in small roles in the films In Name Only (1939), Blondie Brings Up Baby (1939), Abe Lincoln in Illinois (1940), and Eagle Squadron (1942). She was offered a more substantial role in The Pied Piper (1942) after the actress originally cast came down with measles.

In 1943, she was cast in Twentieth Century Fox's Jane Eyre (1943), in which she played the young Jane Eyre. Her performance received acclaim from critics, who praised her acting skills.

She played Young Nora in The Keys of the Kingdom (1944). Metro-Goldwyn-Mayer wanted her to star in their film National Velvet (1944), but Twentieth Century Fox wouldn't allow her contract to be half-sold. Instead, the part went to Garner's Jane Eyre co-star Elizabeth Taylor.

In 1944, she was cast as Francie Nolan in Elia Kazan's adaptation of the Betty Smith novel A Tree Grows in Brooklyn. Her performance in A Tree Grows in Brooklyn (1945) was universally acclaimed. At the 18th Academy Awards she was awarded the Academy Juvenile Award largely for this performance.

After the success of A Tree Grows in Brooklyn, she had a relatively smaller role in the musical Nob Hill (1945). That same year, she starred in the comedy Junior Miss (1945), which Twentieth Century Fox produced specifically with Garner in mind for the leading role.

Garner continued to star in films throughout the rest of the 40's including Home Sweet Homicide (1946), Thunder in the Valley (1947), Daisy Kenyon (1947), The Sign of the Ram (1948), Bomba, the Jungle Boy (1949), The Big Cat (1949), and The Lovable Cheat (1949). In 1947, Garner appeared as herself in a promotional trailer for Miracle on 34th Street.

Like many child performers, Garner was unable to make a successful transition into adult film roles and she only had roles in two films throughout the 50's, Teresa (1951), and Black Widow (1954).

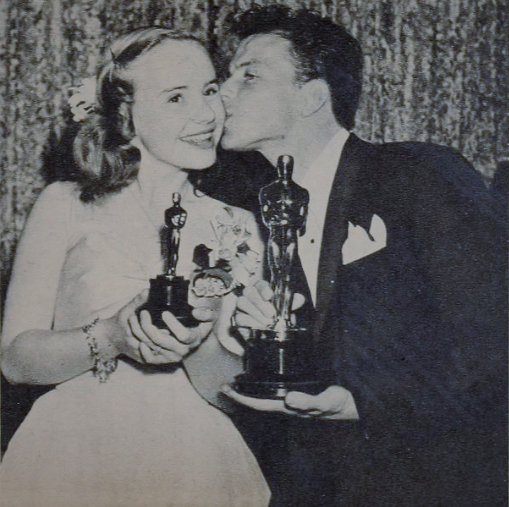
Garner with Frank Sinatra, 1946

== Stage ==
In 1949, Garner starred in Peg O' My Heart at the Famous Artists Playhouse in Fayetteville, New York. In 1954, she toured with a troupe in several states, performing in The Moon Is Blue. Garner headlined the national tour of the William Inge hit Broadway play Bus Stop beginning in 1955. She starred with Albert Salmi, who later became her husband. Garner also appeared with Dick York in the touring production.

Garner's Broadway credits include Home Is the Hero, First Lady, The Royal Family, and The Man.

== Radio and television ==
In 1950, Garner starred as Esther Smith in the radio comedy Meet Me in St. Louis. The program ran two months on NBC.

Garner was a panelist in two television programs, Leave It to the Girls on ABC and NBC and Who Said That? on NBC. In 1951, she starred in the comedy Two Girls Named Smith on ABC.

In summer 1960, Garner appeared in "The Unfamiliar", an episode of Producer's Choice, and she was cast as Julie in the episode "Stopover" of David McLean's Western series Tate. In 1960 and again in 1962, Garner was cast in the episodes "Once Around the Circuit" and "Build My Gallows Low", respectively, on the ABC series Adventures in Paradise, with Gardner McKay. Garner appeared as Edie Brewer in the 1961 Naked City episode "Button in the Haystack" alongside Albert Salmi, to whom she was married at the time, and in which the couple played husband and wife onscreen. In 1961, she starred with Richard Boone in the episode "Dream Girl" on Have Gun – Will Travel. During the early 1960s, Garner also appeared in one episode each of Bonanza ("The Rival") and Combat!, both under director Robert Altman (see next section).

== Later years ==
After Garner's film career ended, she ventured into stage acting and had some success, but also worked as a real estate agent and fleet car executive between acting jobs to support herself. After a decade away from work in feature films, she appeared as the pregnant aunt in the critically acclaimed film, A Wedding (1978), directed by Robert Altman, with whom she had worked on television in the early 1960s. Her final screen performance was a small part in a made-for-television feature This Year's Blonde (1980).

== Personal life and death ==
Garner married singer/game show host Richard Hayes on February 22, 1951; the couple divorced in 1953. She then married actor Albert Salmi on May 16, 1956; they divorced on March 13, 1963. (Another source says that Garner and Salmi were married May 18, 1956.) Garner's final marriage was to Kenyon Foster Brown. After a few years, that marriage also ended in divorce.

In 1984, at age 52, Garner died from pancreatic cancer in the Motion Picture & Television Country House and Hospital in Los Angeles. Her only child, Catherine Ann Salmi, died of heart disease on May 17, 1995. She was 38 years old. Peggy's mother, Virginia, outlived both her only child and only grandchild.

== Filmography ==
=== Film ===
Year	Title	Role	Notes
1938	Little Miss Thoroughbred	Praying Orphan	Uncredited
1939	In Name Only	Ellen	
1939	Blondie Brings Up Baby	Melinda Mason	
1940	Abe Lincoln in Illinois	Little Girl	Uncredited
1942	Eagle Squadron	Child	
1942	The Pied Piper	Sheila Cavanaugh	
1943	Jane Eyre	Jane Eyre as a child	
1944	The Keys of the Kingdom	Young Nora	
1945	A Tree Grows in Brooklyn	Francie Nolan	Academy Juvenile Award
1945	Nob Hill	Katie Flanagan	
1945	Junior Miss	Judy Graves	
1946	Home Sweet Homicide	Dinah Carstairs	
1947	Thunder in the Valley	Maggie Moore	
1947	Daisy Kenyon	Rosamund O'Mara	
1948	The Sign of the Ram	Christine St. Aubyn	
1949	Bomba, the Jungle Boy	Patricia Harland	
1949	The Big Cat	Doris Cooper	
1949	The Lovable Cheat	Julie Mercadet	
1951	Teresa	Susan Cass	
1954	Black Widow	Nancy "Nanny" Ordway	
1966	The Cat	Susan Kilby	
1978	A Wedding	Candice Ruteledge	

=== Television ===
Year	Title	Role	Notes
1949	The Ford Theatre Hour	Beth March	Season 2 Episode 6: "Little Women"
1950	Prudential Family Playhouse	Catherine Hilton	Season 1 Episode 3: "Call It a Day"
1951	Two Girls Named Smith	Barbara "Babs" Smith	TV series (46 episodes)
1952	Lux Video Theatre	Judy	Season 2 Episode 36: "Salad Days"
1952	Lux Video Theatre	Girl	Season 2 Episode 51: "Orchard"
1952	Robert Montgomery Presents	Claire Ambler	Season 3 Episode 21: "Claire Ambler"
1952	Westinghouse Studio One	Honey Weber / Frances Weston	Season 5 Episode 8: "Plan for Escape"
1954	Eight Witnesses	Helen Hildebrand	TV movie
1954	Robert Montgomery Presents		Season 5 Episode 40: "Once Upon a Time"
1955	Robert Montgomery Presents		Season 6 Episode 20: "Deadline"
1955	The Best of Broadway	Kaye Hamilton	Season 1 Episode 8: "Stage Door"
1955	Climax!	Nora Wallen	Season 1 Episode 23: "The First and the Last"
1955	Westinghouse Studio One	Jenny	Season 7 Episode 35: "Strange Companion"
1955	Stage 7	Miranda Abbelard	Season 1 Episode 18: "The Time of Day"
1957	DuPont Show of the Month	Lena Anderson	Season 1 Episode 3: "Beyond This Place"
1957	Kraft Television Theatre		Season 10 Episode 52: "The Killer Instinct"
1958	Kraft Television Theatre	Jane Bell	Season 11 Episode 15: "The Velvet Trap"
1958	General Electric Theater	Janey	Season 6 Episode 25: "The Unfamiliar"
1958	Westinghouse Studio One	Katey	Season 10 Episode 39: "Man Under Glass"
1959	The United States Steel Hour	Frances Barclay	Season 6 Episode 23: "Wish on the Moon"
1959	The Lineup	Yvonne	Season 6 Episode 5: "Thrills"
1960	Dick Powell's Zane Grey Theatre	Sarah Malloy	Season 4 Episode 28: "Deception"
1960	Tate	Julie	Season 1 Episode 2: "Stopover"
1960	Alcoa Presents One Step Beyond	Laura Perkins	Season 3 Season 11: "Tonight at 12:17"
1960	Adventures in Paradise	Deborah Baxter	Season 2 Episode 3: "Once Around the Circuit"
1961	Naked City	Edie Brewer	Season 2 Episode 16: "Button in the Haystack"
1961	Bonanza	Cameo Johnson	Season 2 Episode 28: "The Rival"
1962	Have Gun – Will Travel	Virginia "Ginger" Adams	Season 5 Episode 22: "Dream Girl"
1962	Adventures in Paradise	Lorrie Hamilton	Season 3 Episode 20: "Build My Gallows Low"
1962	Alfred Hitchcock Presents	Madeline Drake	Season 7 Episode 32: "Victim Four"
1962	The Untouchables	Margaret Radick / Margaret Wilson	Season 4 Episode 8: "Elegy"
1963	Alcoa Premiere	Bernice Meredith	Season 2 Episode 14: "Impact of an Execution"
1963	Perry Mason	Letty Arthur	Season 6 Episode 16: "The Case of Constant Doyle"
1963	Combat!	Nurse Lieutenant Amelia Marsh	Season 1 Episode 20: "Off Limits"
1963	The Untouchables	Barbara Sultan	Season 4 Episode 25: "The Giant Killer"
1963	The Patriots	Patsy Jefferson Randolph	TV movie
1964	The Eleventh Hour	Myra Hopp	Season 2 Episode 18: "Who Chopped Down the Cherry Tree?"
1964	The Man from U.N.C.L.E.	Anne Donfield	Season 1 Episode 9: "The Project Strigas Affair"
1965	The Outer Limits	Amanda Frank	Season 2 Episode 17: "The Probe"
1967	Batman	Betsy Boldface	Season 3 Episode 2: "Ring Around the Riddler"
1968	The Big Valley	Mrs. Whittaker	Season 4 Episode 11: "The Prize"
1978	Betrayal	Mrs. Carol Stockwood	TV movie
1979	Lou Grant	Dixie Collins	Season 3 Episode 13: "Kids"
1980	This Year's Blonde	Father's Wife (Stepmother)	TV movie (final appearance)
