= Little Miss Thoroughbred =

1938 film by John Farrow

- Directed by: John Farrow
- Screenplay by: Albert DeMond; George Bricker
- Produced by: Bryan Foy
- Starring: John Litel; Frank McHugh; Ann Sheridan; Janet Chapman
- Cinematography: L. William O'Connell
- Edited by: Everett Dodd
- Music by: Howard Jackson
- Distributed by: Warner Bros. Pictures
- Release date: June 4, 1938
- Running time: 65 minutes
- Country: United States
- Language: English

Little Miss Thoroughbred is a 1938 film directed by John Farrow. Peggy Ann Garner made her debut in the film. It was also known as Little Lady Luck.

== Plot ==
Knowing her father's out there somewhere, little Janet runs away from an orphanage. A couple of gamblers, Nails Morgan and Todd Harrington, are running late to get a wager down, but Nails lies to a cop, O'Reilly, pretending the little girl is his daughter; Janet plays along.

Madge Perry is charmed by her sweetheart Nails's new "child." The superstitious Nails wins at a dice game with the little girl nearby, so Madge convinces him that Janet is good luck. Madge picks a sure thing at the racetrack, having gotten a tip, but pretends it was Janet who suggested betting on the horse.

O'Reilly brings his own daughter by for a visit. Discovering what is going on, he says Janet can only stay if Nails and Madge immediately get married. They do, but after Janet's photo runs in the newspaper, the orphanage feels being around gamblers is bad for the child and asks to regain custody. Nails wins in court, but only by vowing to find a proper job.

== Cast ==
- John Litel as Nails
- Ann Sheridan as Madge
- Janet Chapman as Janet
- Frank McHugh as Harrington
- Robert Homans as O'Reilly

== Production ==
The film was announced in January 1938 as Little Lady Luck. It was inspired by the success of Little Miss Marker (1934). George Bricker and Albert Demond worked on the story and John Farrow was announced as director. Warners said instead of using established child actors they look for talent from orphanages. Lead roles were given to Ann Sheridan and John Litel.

Four year old Janet Chapman was cast in the lead. Peggy Moran was signed. Filming began late January 1938. Chapman was signed to a seven-year contract. In March the title was changed to Little Miss Thoroughbred.

The film marked the debut of Peggy Ann Garner.
