= The Old Master Painter =

Song
- Published: 1949
- Composer(s): Beasley Smith
- Lyricist(s): Haven Gillespie

"The Old Master Painter" is a song composed by Beasley Smith with lyrics by Haven Gillespie about a spiritual rendering of a sunset which evokes God. Published in 1949, it has since been recorded by many different artists, including Jackie Paris, Richard Hayes, Dick Haymes, Frank Sinatra, Snooky Lanson, Peggy Lee, Phil Harris and Mel Tormé.

In 1966, the Beach Boys recorded the song as "My Only Sunshine" in medley with "You Are My Sunshine" during sessions for their unfinished concept album Smile.

== Sources ==
- Badman, Keith (2004). The Beach Boys: The Definitive Diary of America's Greatest Band, on Stage and in the Studio. Backbeat Books. ISBN 978-0-87930-818-6.
- Furia, Philip, ed. (2002). American song lyricists, 1920-1960. Detroit: Gale Group. ISBN 9780787660093.
- Giddins, Gary (2004). Weather Bird : Jazz at the Dawn of Its Second Century: Jazz at the Dawn of Its Second Century. Oxford University Press. ISBN 9780195348163.
