= Miracle on Main Street =

- Theatrical release poster
- Directed by: Steve Sekely
- Screenplay by: Frederick J. Jackson
- Story by: Samuel Ornitz; Boris Ingster
- Produced by: Jack H. Skirball
- Starring: Margo; Walter Abel; William Collier Sr. Jane Darwell; Lyle Talbot; Wynne Gibson
- Cinematography: Charles Van Enger
- Edited by: Barney Rogan
- Music by: Walter Jurmann
- Production company: Arcadia Pictures
- Distributed by: Columbia Pictures
- Release date: December 19, 1939
- Running time: 78 minutes
- Country: United States
- Language: English

Miracle on Main Street is a 1939 American drama film directed by Steve Sekely and written by Frederick J. Jackson. The film stars Margo, Walter Abel, William Collier Sr., Jane Darwell, Lyle Talbot and Wynne Gibson. The film was released on December 19, 1939, by Columbia Pictures.

== Plot ==
Maria Porter, a belly dancer in a carnival side show in the Mexican quarter of Los Angeles, is unhappily married to Dick, a carnival barker with a criminal nature. Attempting to drum up business on Christmas Eve, the pair try to rob an undercover policeman disguised as a lecherous drunk, and when the officer announces that they are under arrest, they flee. Maria joins a crowd entering a church, where she finds an abandoned infant in the Christ child's manger. As a disguise, she picks up the baby and carries it to her boardinghouse. To avoid the police, Dick leaves Maria to fend for herself and disappears. The deserted Maria is helped by Dr. Miles and her landlady, Mrs. Herman, and soon finds herself unable to part with the infant. To support herself, Maria takes a job sewing so that she can stay home with the baby, but she is unable to earn enough money to pay her bills. When Mrs. Herman urges her to return to dancing, Maria goes to Pepito's nightclub to ask for work. At the club, Jim Foreman, a lonely, recently divorced rancher, overhears Maria imploring Pepito for a job and, taking pity on her, invites her for a drink. Their drink initiates a courtship, and Maria, with Jim's support, becomes a fashion designer. Jim falls in love with Maria, but his proposal of marriage puts her into a quandary about revealing her sordid past. Just as she is about to confess all to Jim, Dick returns and offers to get out of his wife's life for a price. To prevent Dick from extorting money from Jim, Maria pretends that she still loves the man who caused her such anguish. In revenge, Dick tells the welfare department that Maria is an unfit mother. All ends happily, however, when Dick is killed in an attempted robbery, and Jim returns to take care of Maria and the baby.

== Cast ==
- Margo as Maria Porter
- Walter Abel as Jim Foreman
- William Collier Sr. as Dr. Miles
- Jane Darwell as Mrs. Herman
- Lyle Talbot as Dick Porter
- Wynne Gibson as Sade Blake
- Veda Ann Borg as Flo
- Pat Flaherty as Detective
- George Humbert as Pepito
- Jean Brooks as Nina
- Susan Miller as Singer
- Willie Best as Duke
- Dorothy Devore as Woman in Church
- Ottola Nesmith as Welfare worker
