= Lesley Woods =

American actress

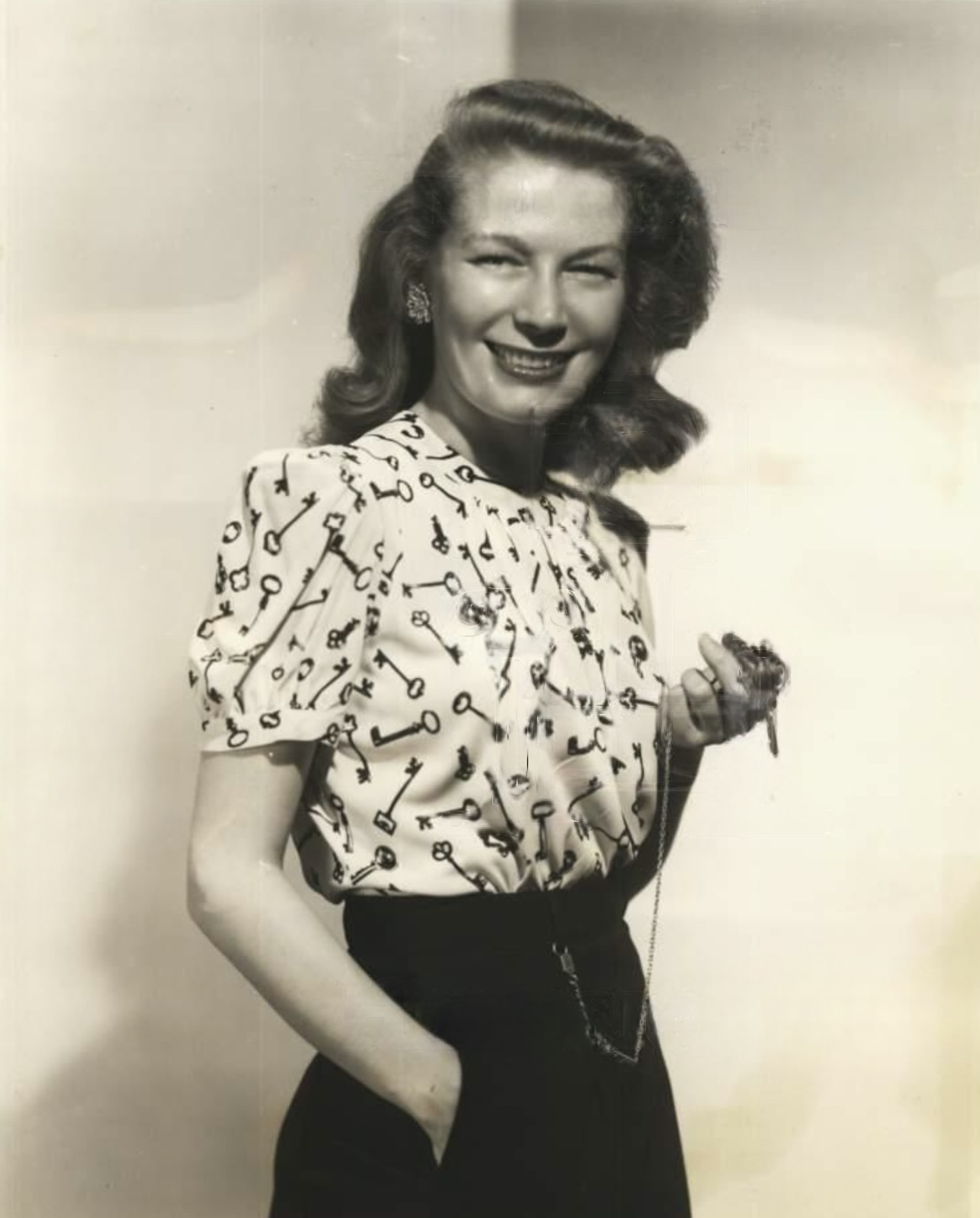
- Woods in 1946
- Born: August 22, 1910; Berwick, Iowa, U.S.
- Died: August 2, 2003 (aged 92); Los Angeles, California, U.S.
- Education: Goodman School of Drama
- Occupation: Actress
- Years active: 1936–2001
- Known for: The Shadow; The Bold and the Beautiful
- Spouse: Richard McMurray
- Children: Sam McMurray (stepson)

Lesley Woods (August 22, 1910 – August 2, 2003) was an American radio, stage and television actress. She was a graduate of the Goodman School of Drama in Chicago.

== Early years ==
Woods was born in Berwick, Iowa, and enrolled in a midwestern dramatic school.

== Personal life and death ==
Woods was married to actor Richard McMurray. Sam McMurray is her stepson. She died on August 2, 2003.

== Stage ==
When Woods was 19 years old she joined a summer stock theater company in Benton Harbor, Michigan. She went to New York, where a friend helped her to find work with a stock company in Spring Lake, New Jersey.

Woods' acting on Broadway included being in Double Dummy (1936), Excursion (1937), Comes the Revelation (1942), The Assassin (1945), and A Case of Libel (1963–64). She was a member of Theatre West. A Billboard review of Comes the Revelation summarized Woods' acting as follows: "Small, blond and attractive, Miss Woods plays with an honesty and restraint that are as rare as they are commendable. Quiet, sincere and tremendously effective, she does one of the finest jobs of the entire season."

== Radio ==
Woods' roles on radio programs included those shown in the table below.

Program	Role
Backstage Wife	Maida
Boston Blackie	Mary Wesley
Bright Horizon	Rosie; Margaret Anderson McCarey
Bulldog Drummond	"heroine roles" "the feminine lead"
Casey, Crime Photographer	Ann Williams
Guiding Light	Helene Cunningham
Joyce Jordan, Girl Interne	Margot Sherwood
The Man I Married	Evelyn Waring
Midstream	Meredith Conway
Portia Faces Life	Elaine Arden
Road of Life	Carol Martin
The Romance of Helen Trent	Tember Adams
Rosemary	Audrey Roberts
The Shadow	Margo Lane
This Is Nora Drake	Peg Martinson
We Love and Learn	Mickey
Woman in White	Janet Munson Adams

Other programs on which Woods was a regular included Crime and Peter Chambers, Inner Sanctum Mystery, The Private Files of Rex Saunders, Treasury Star Parade, and It Can Be Done.

== Television ==
A veteran of at least 10 daytime serials, Woods' daytime debut was as Claire Bannister Steele on Young Dr. Malone from 1959-1963 as the serial's leading villainess. Following that, she appeared on The Secret Storm as Evelyn Dark (1964), A Flame in the Wind as Miriam Bentley (1964–66), The Nurses (where she starred with McMurray) as Vivian Gentry (1965-1967), Search for Tomorrow as the original Andrea Whiting (1967), Bright Promise as Isabel Jones (1971-1972), Return to Peyton Place as Zoe Tate (1972-1973), and Days of Our Lives as Dorothy Kelly (1978). On General Hospital, she played the role of Edna Hadley (1977-1978, 1980), the New York landlady who arranged for Heather Grant to sell her baby, Steven Lars. She guest-starred in an episode of Gibbsville in 1976, originated the role of Amanda Ewing, Jock's first wife, on Dallas, and had a recurring role as Chase Gioberti's housekeeper, Mrs. Miller, on Falcon Crest (1984-1987). She played Langley Wallingford's first wife, Betty Miller (Hilary's mother) on All My Children in 1984, and was part of the original cast of The Bold and the Beautiful as Helen Logan from 1987 to 1989, and again in 2001, when her character was a great-great-grandmother.

== Television appearances ==
Year	Program	Episode/source
1956	Robert Montgomery Presents	-----
