= Richard Hayes (singer) =

American singer and actor

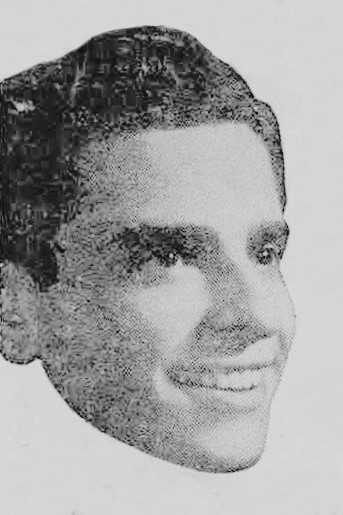

Background information
- Born: Richard Herbert Hayes; January 5, 1930; Brooklyn, New York, U.S.
- Died: March 10, 2014 (aged 84) Los Angeles, California, U.S.
- Genres: Swing, pop
- Occupations: Singer, actor
- Instrument: Vocals
- Years active: 1948–1990
- Labels: Mercury (1948–1954); ABC (1956–1957); Decca (1957–1959); Columbia (1960–1961); Contempo (1964)
- Formerly of: Mitch Miller; Kitty Kallen; George Bassman; Xavier Cugat; Joe Reichman; Richard Hayman
- Military career
- Allegiance: United States of America
- Branch: United States Army
- Service years: 1953–1955
- Rank: Second lieutenant
- Commands: Fort Dix; Governors Island
- Conflicts: Korean War; Cold War

Richard Herbert Hayes (January 5, 1930 – March 10, 2014) was an American singer and actor and, in his latter career, a game show host and talk radio host. Hayes was well known during television's golden age as the unnamed boyfriend opposite his real-life wife Peggy Ann Garner on the ABC sitcom Two Girls Named Smith for two seasons in 1951.

Hayes was best-known and remembered for his music. Born in Brooklyn, New York, on January 5, 1930, Hayes had much success as a recording artist while in his late teens. Between 1948 and 1953, Hayes had fourteen top 25 hits. That included four top-10 hits recorded and produced during his time at Mercury Records. His most successful record was his rendition of "The Old Master Painter" which was released in 1949. The song, produced by Mitch Miller, reached no. 2 on the national charts in December 1949 and remained on the charts for twelve weeks until March 1950.

In addition to Mercury, Hayes recorded and produced songs for ABC, Decca, Columbia and finally Contempo Records. After leaving Contempo in 1964, Hayes pursued a further career in television, making several appearances on The Ed Sullivan Show and The Robert Q. Lewis Show. Hayes also was a regular guest on Arthur Godfrey's television and radio series between 1958 and 1972.

Hayes was also noted for his military service and career during that time. He was drafted into the army in 1953. His rank was second lieutenant. Hayes was stationed at Fort Dix, New Jersey, then Governors Island, New York. He served during the Korean War which ended in June 1953, a few months after Hayes's conscription, and the Cold War. The fact that he was in the army and his musical/acting background, Hayes earned a permanent spot as the emcee and co-host with Arlene Francis on the ABC competition series Soldier Parade in 1954. He was hired after the departure of Steve Allen. He remained on the show until its cancellation in June 1955. He left the army that same year.

In the 1970s, Hayes retired from acting and became a game show host of All About Faces. He also worked as a talk-radio host at several radio stations in Philadelphia and New York City before retiring in 1990.

Hayes died on March 10, 2014, at the age of 84 in his home in Los Angeles, California, after battling a long illness.

== Early life ==
Richard Herbert Hayes was born on January 5, 1930, in Brooklyn, New York. Hayes was a part of the glee club in high school. Hayes got his first singing job on Bob Emery's Rainbow House children's radio program. He heard the program on WOR radio one day when he was 14. After auditioning to sing on the show, he got a part in the show's choir. The series was cancelled shortly after Hayes joined the cast.

== Career ==
=== Music ===
==== Mercury Records (1948-54) ====
Hayes was discovered by a personnel from Mercury Records in 1948. Hayes was singing at the Leon & Eddie's nightclub in New York City. He was approached by somebody who invited Hayes to perform on Art Ford's local Saturday night TV series on station WPIX in New York. Hayes eventually became a regular performer on Art Ford Saturday Night. A vice president from Mercury saw Hayes on the series and invited him to record for Mercury. Between 1948 and 1949, Hayes made three recordings for Mercury that weren't that successful. But his fourth recording, a version of the song "The Old Master Painter", became an instant success.

The song had been previously recorded by singers Dick Haymes, Peggy Lee & Mel Tormé, Phil Harris, Snooky Lanson and Frank Sinatra. But it was Hayes's recording of this song that made the charts. The song was ranked number 2 on the Billboard Hot 100 charts and remained there for twelve weeks.

The next song he recorded for the Mercury label was a version of the song "My Foolish Heart" in 1950. He again enjoyed the producing accompaniment of Mitch Miller. Hayes also enjoyed another hit. Although not as popular as his previous song, "My Foolish Heart" did manage to rank number 21 on the charts. Shortly after the release of the song, Miller left Mercury and joined rival label Columbia Records. Hayes remained with Mercury and recorded four more songs that did not place on the charts. But the fifth song he recorded, a duet with Kitty Kallen entitled "Our Lady Of Fatima", managed to reach number 10 on the charts beginning in September 1950 and remained there for three months.

In March 1951, Hayes recorded another duet with Kallen entitled "The Aba Daba Honeymoon". The song was also on the charts for three months. Before Hayes and Kallen recorded the song, it was made famous by Debbie Reynolds and Carleton Carpenter in the movie Two Weeks with Love the year earlier.

During the summer of 1951 Hayes recorded a version of Nat King Cole's hit "Too Young" on the Mercury label. It reached number 24 on the pop charts. That side charted at number fourteen as did the flip side "Go! Go! Go!" both recorded with George Bassman's orchestra. In late October 1951, Hayes had another big seller for Mercury entitled "Out in the Cold Again" with The Joe Reichman Orchestra. The record again made it into the top ten best sellers in the country and remained on the charts for close to three months. Hayes's next hit came in May 1952 with the tune "I'll Walk Alone" which, despite a number of versions including the big hit version by Don Cornell, Hayes's recording got to number 24. At the same time his recording of "Junco Partner", recorded with Eddie Sauter's Orchestra, was released. The record had a three-month stay on the charts and was ranked number fifteen.

His next two songs were recorded with the accompaniment of The Jimmy Carroll Orchestra. They were "The Mask Is Off" and "Forgetting You". Both of the songs were recorded in 1952, the latter being ranked number 15 on the charts. Hayes's last hit song with Mercury was entitled "Midnight in Paris", recorded in the summer of 1953 with The Richard Hayman Orchestra, which was a top twenty-five seller.

==== ABC, Decca and Columbia Records (1956-61) ====
Hayes left Mercury Records in 1954 in hopes of joining Columbia Records where Miller had gone four years earlier. But when Columbia turned him down, Hayes joined the ABC label. He left ABC in 1957 and joined the Decca label. He remained with Decca for two years before Columbia finally signed Hayes in 1960. He left Columbia in 1961. He released more than 40 sides with ABC, Decca and Columbia but none of them ever made the charts.

=== Television and military career ===
Hayes was drafted into the military in 1953. He served in the Army and was stationed originally in Fort Dix, New Jersey, then in Governors Island, New York. He served during the last few months of the Korean War. During his service in the military, Hayes was selected to become the co-host of Arlene Francis and replacement for Steve Allen on the game show Talent Patrol. He remained with the series until its cancellation in 1955 and left the military that same year.

Hayes made frequent guest star appearances on The Ed Sullivan Show and The Robert Q. Lewis Show between 1956 and 1964. Hayes also made frequent appearances on Arthur Godfrey's radio and television programs between 1958 and 1972.

=== Later career ===
Shortly after the release of his last record in 1964, Hayes worked on several game shows. He first worked as an announcer on the original ABC game show Supermarket Sweep from 1965 to 1967, followed by a stint as host of the 1967–1968 series The Baby Game. From 1971 to 1972, Hayes was the host of the Canadian syndicated hidden camera game show All About Faces.

In the late 1970s, Hayes moved back to New York where he became a congenial radio host. He first spent several years at WMCA in New York, then went to WWDB in Philadelphia, and from there to WCAU 1210am (now WPHT), where he stayed until 1990. While on radio in Philadelphia, he wrote and recorded his radio show theme song to the tune of "Secret Agent Man".

== Personal life and death ==
Hayes was originally married to actress Peggy Ann Garner from 1951 to 1953. Hayes was Garner's co-star on Two Girls Named Smith. Garner and Hayes divorced in 1953. Hayes married a second time. With his second wife, Hayes had four children; Drew, Jackie, Jim and Gideon. His son Jim is a TV sportscaster for the St. Louis Cardinals Major League Baseball team. His son Drew works for Cumulus Talk Radio in Los Angeles.

Hayes died on March 10, 2014, in Los Angeles, California, at the age of 84 after battling a long illness. He was survived by his children and several grandchildren.

== Filmography ==
Year	Title	Role	Notes
1951	Two Girls Named Smith	Babs' Boyfriend	Cast regular Unknown episodes
1951	The Kate Smith Hour	Himself	
1952	Star of the Family	Himself	
1952	Stars for Sale	Himself	
1952–1956	The Ed Sullivan Show	Himself	Various episodes
1954–1955	Soldier Parade	Emcee	Series regular Replacement for Steve Allen
1954–1956	The Robert Q. Lewis Show	Himself (singer)	
1957–1961	Tonight Starring Jack Paar	Himself (Guest)	15 episodes
1958	Country Style, USA	Himself	1 episode
1962	To Tell the Truth	Guest panelist	Game show
1963	The Jerry Lester Show	Various roles	Series regular
1965–1967	Supermarket Sweep	Announcer	Game show
1967–1968	The Baby Game	Host	Game show
1970	The David Frost Show	Himself	
1971–1972	All About Faces	Host	Game show
