= Betty Winkler =

American actress

- Signed fan photo
- Born: April 19, 1914; Berwick, Pennsylvania
- Died: June 6, 2002 (aged 88); Miami, Florida
- Occupation: Radio actor
- Known for: Joyce Jordan, M.D.

Betty Winkler (April 19, 1914 Berwick, Pennsylvania – June 6, 2002 Miami, Florida) was an American radio actor. She studied acting at the Cleveland Playhouse. She was a radio performer in Chicago and New York City in the 1930s and 1940s. She performed in a number of radio shows, including dramas, comedies, and variety shows. During the late 1930s, Winkler was considered one of radio's top stars.

== Personal life ==
Winkler married her Rosemary co-star George Keane in January 1948 at Fort Lee, New Jersey. When Keane was forced to give up his role due to illness, Winkler gave up her role as well and they both moved to Europe.

== Career ==
Winkler's radio career began in Chicago in the 1930s. In the early 1940s, Winkler relocated from Chicago to New York City. In New York, Winkler continued to build her performance career, appearing in shows such as Attorney at Law, Abie's Irish Rose, Joyce Jordan, M.D., and Rosemary.

By the mid-1940s, Winkler had become one of the most successful radio performers in the country. An article in Billboard magazine published in December 1944 considered Winkler to be the fourth highest paid woman in radio and called her a "heavy dough collecting" soap player. In the late 1940s, Winkler became involved with New Stages, Inc., a collective of radio professionals. In 1947, Winkler was listed as a member the New Stages, Inc. project; a project composed of radio professionals who were also shareholders that sought to advance models of broadcasting. The following year, New Stages, Inc. developed radio and television packages to be sold and Winkler was listed as part of the permanent acting company. Winkler served as a committee member on the board of directors for New Stages, Inc. until fall of 1948.

== The House Un-American Activities Committee and Red Channels ==
In 1955, Winkler was named as a member of the Communist party in a witness hearing for the House Un-American Activities Committee. George Hall, an actor who admitted being a member of the Communist party, named Winkler along with seven others, including Winkler's husband George Keane. Hall stated that Winkler was a member of a "Midtown Branch" of the Communist party that met in New York in 1946 and 1947. Prior to Hall's testimony Winkler had not been officially mentioned in connection with HUAC or the Communist party.

== Sensory awareness and later career ==
Winkler was listed in Red Channels in 1950. Unable to continue to work in broadcasting, she went on to have a career as a sensory therapist. Following the recommendation of her psychiatrist, Clara Thompson, Winkler took classes with Charlotte Selver, a German therapist who coined the name "sensory awareness" to describe her approach. Influenced by Selver, Winkler went on to develop a successful career in sensory awareness. Winkler was known as innovator in the study of sensory awareness and taught courses privately and at the Human Relations Center of the New School of Social Research in New York City.

== Radio Roles (Partial List) ==
- Lights Out (1935-1939)
- Fantasies from Lights Out (1945)
- Lone Journey (1940-1943, 1946–1947, 1951–1952)
- Attorney at Law (1938)
- Romance (1943-1944)
- The O'Neills (1934-1942)
- Grand Hotel
- The Chicago Theater of the Air (1940-1955)
- Abie's Irish Rose (1942-1944)
- Curtain Time (1945-1948)
- This Life Is Mine (1943-1945)
- Edgar A. Guest (1932-1938)
- Joyce Jordan, M.D. (1942)
- Fibber McGee and Company
- Girl Alone (1935-1941)
- Tommy Riggs (1938)
- Rosemary (1944-1945)
- The Last Man (1939)
- One Thousand and One Wives (1939)
