= Talent Patrol =

- Also known as: Soldier Patrol
- Genre: Game show
- Directed by: Edward Nugent
- Presented by: Steve Allen; Arlene Francis
- Announcer: Steve Allen; Bud Collyer; Richard Hayes
- Country of origin: United States
- Original language: English

Production
- Producer: Dave Myers
- Running time: 30 minutes (season 1-2); 60 minutes (season 3)

Original release
- Network: ABC
- Release: January 19, 1953 – June 1955

Talent Patrol is an American game show that was broadcast during the 1950s. The series starred Steve Allen and later Arlene Francis as the hosts. The series ran on the American Broadcasting Company from 1953-1955.

== Overview ==
The program served as a recruiting tool for the U. S. Army, with each episode featuring four acts from an Army camp. The winner was taken to one of the top plays in New York City and was given "a whirlwind tour of Manhattan night spots". Different places were visited each week. The Ninth Infantry Division Band from Fort Dix, New Jersey provided music.

== Broadcast history ==
Talent Patrol originally was broadcast on Monday nights from 9:30-10:00 pm.

Starting with season two, the series moved to Saturdays at 8-8:30 pm. Its primetime competition was The Jackie Gleason Show on CBS, Bonino on NBC and National Football League Professional Football on DuMont. Beginning in April 1954, the series moved to Thursdays at 8-8:30 pm. Its third and last season aired on Sunday nights from 9:30-10:00 pm.
