= Crime and Peter Chambers =

American old-time radio detective program

- Country of origin: United States
- Language(s): English
- Syndicates: NBC
- Starring: Dane Clark
- Announcer: Fred Collins
- Created by: Henry Kane
- Written by: Henry Kane
- Directed by: Fred Weihe
- Produced by: Henry Kane
- Original release: April 6 – September 7, 1954

Crime and Peter Chambers is an American old-time radio detective program. It was broadcast on NBC from April 6, 1954, until September 7, 1954.

== Format ==
Crime and Peter Chambers brought to radio a fictional private detective created by author Henry Kane, who also produced the show and wrote for it. Kane introduced Chambers in the 1947 novel A Halo for Nobody. and featured him in a series of novels, the last of which was Kill for the Millions (1972).

Chambers was based in New York City, and his fee was $500 per day. Unlike many private detectives on radio, Chambers usually coordinated his work with that of the police. In fact, his best friend was police Lieutenant Louis Parker.

Radio historian John Dunning described the program as "an undistinguished half-hour, filled with glib dialogue that played into Dane Clark's image as a screen tough guy."

== Personnel ==
Dane Clark starred as Peter Chambers, and Bill Zuckert played Lieutenant Louis Parker. Actors often heard in supporting roles included Fran Carlon, Roger DeKoven, William Griffis, Leon Janney, Bryna Raeburn, Elaine Rost, Everett Sloane, Edgar Stehli, Evelyn Varden, Patricia Wheel, Lesley Woods, and Lawson Zerbe. Fred Collins was the announcer, and Fred Weihe was the director.
