= Donna Keath =

American actress

- Died: 1962
- Occupation: Radio actor
- Spouse(s): Peter Neubauer and Jerre Mangione

Donna Keath (died 1962) was an actress who worked in radio and on the stage.

Although Keath was better known for her work in radio, she performed on stage in The Playboy of Newark at the Provincetown Playhouse in March 1943. She also played the character of Irene Halenczik in the short-running Broadway production of Sophie in December 1944. Keath gained fame playing the character of Lynne Dineen in the long running soap opera radio program Young Dr. Malone (1939 -1960).

Keath was a founding member of Stage for Action (SFA), a “progressive theatre company” founded in December 1943. Keath became the chairman of SFA in April 1944. According to Keath, the project was broadly educational: “We are willing," she said, "to use the talents by which we make a living to explain the significance behind the headlines.”

In 1943, she co-authored Leave It As You Find It with Andrew Rosenthal. A few years later, the New York Times noted that Keath had co-authored an untitled piece with playwright Alden Nash, which was eventually registered for copyright in July 1946 as a three-act play entitled Soon the Morning. Keath also was a national board member of the American Federation of Radio Artists (AFRA) and one of the New York delegates at the 1943 AFRA National Convention in Chicago.

On October 24, 1945, Keath married psychiatrist Peter B. Neubauer. On March 14, 1955, she married Jerre Mangione.

Keath was blacklisted in television in June 1950, when her name appeared in the anti-communist publication Red Channels: The Report of Communist Influence in Radio and Television.
