= Two Girls Named Smith =

American television situation comedy series (1951)

- Genre: Sitcom
- Country of origin: United States
- Original language: English

Original release
- Network: ABC
- Release: January 20 – October 13, 1951

Two Girls Named Smith is an American television situation comedy that was broadcast on ABC from January 20, 1951, through October 13, 1951.

== Premise ==
Frances Smith and Barbara Smith were cousins who moved to New York City from Omaha hoping to become a fashion designer and a singer, respectively. They shared an apartment at 514 East 51st Street. Their landlord, Mr. Basmany, became advisor and friend to them.

== Cast ==
Characters and Actors in Two Girls Named Smith
Character	Actor(s)
Frances Smith	Peggy French
Babs Smith	Peggy Ann Garner, Nina Foch, Marcia Henderson*
Mr. Basmany	Joseph Buloff
Babs's boyfriend	Richard Hayes
Jeffrey Carter (another boyfriend)	Kermit Kegley

- Foch replaced Garner in several episodes in July and August; Henderson appeared in the role after Garner left the show in September.

== Production ==
Richard Lewis produced Two Girls Named Smith. Its directors included Charles Durbin, Mervyn Nelson, and Cort Steen. Peter Barry was one of the writers, and Jacques Press provided the music.

The show was broadcast on Saturdays at noon Eastern Time. The sponsor was B. T. Babbitt (for Bab-O soap and Glim dishwashing detergent). It originated live from WJZ in New York City. Its competition included The Big Top on CBS. It was replaced by the Betty Crocker Star Matinee after the Babbitt company dropped it.

== Lawsuit ==
The program was the focus of a lawsuit for piracy. Jerome Chodorov, Joseph A. Fields, and Ruth McKenney considered the show's characters and premise to be too much like those of the book My Sister Eileen and the film of the same title, which they created. The suit, filed in Federal Court in May 1951, said that Lewis and Bernard Schubert had a deal with the plaintiffs that permitted use of the book "under specified conditions", but that those rights were to be terminated if the resulting script was not used prior to November 25, 1950. Schubert adapted the film for ABC in 1950, making a pilot titled Ruth and Eileen on July 13, 1950, but the episode was never broadcast. The project, which had originally been titled My Sister Eileen, was reworked into Two Girls Named Smith.

== Critical response ==
A review in the trade publication Billboard called Two Girls Named Smith "a well-cast, slickly produced, cleverly scripted concoction that should find its way into many TV homes."

A review of the premiere episode in the trade publication Variety said, "the series opener was a cute story" and called the series "a topflight situation comedy". The review noted "some delightful moments" in the script, that were "well played" by the actors.
