= Shaindel Kalish =

American actress

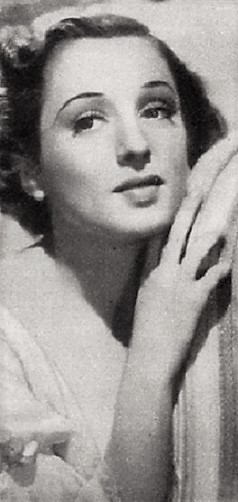
- Kalish (as Ann Preston, 1936)
- Born: January 15, 1910; Chicago, Illinois, U.S.
- Died: November 30, 2002 (aged 92); Chatham County, North Carolina, U.S.
- Other names: Judith Blake; Ann Shepherd; Ann Preston; Shaindel Kalish Freeman; Judith Preston Blake; Ann S. Sheps; Jennie Shaludel Libman; Ann Shepherd Mann
- Education: Marshall High School
- Alma mater: Goodman Theatre School of Drama
- Occupation: Actress
- Known for: Joyce Jordan, Girl Interne
- Spouses: Charles K. Sherman; Yisrol Paul Mann Libman

Shaindel Kalish (January 15, 1910 – November 30, 2002) was an American actress on stage, on old-time radio, and in films. Her first name was sometimes spelled "Scheindel". She was also known at various times as Judith Blake, Ann Shepherd, Ann Preston, Judith Preston Blake, Ann S. Sheps, and Ann Shepherd Mann. She was a victim of the Hollywood Blacklist.

== Early years ==
Born in Chicago, Kalish was the daughter of Yiddish theater producer Abraham Kalish and his wife, Esther Naidith, and she attended Marshall High School.

She participated in dramatic activities with the Institute Players of the Jewish People's Institute, winning first individual prize for women in a competition in 1932. Kalish also attended the Goodman Theatre School of Drama in Chicago.

== Stage ==
In 1933, Kalish had a leading role in Girls in Uniform, presented at the Blackstone Theatre in Chicago. During the play's run, she turned down an opportunity to meet with representatives from the Radio-Keith-Orpheum film company, saying that she preferred to continue acting on stage. After that play, she had the lead in Sixteen, which was also presented at the Blackstone.

Billed as Ann Shepherd, Kalish acted on Broadway in the 1940s. Her plays included Sophie (1944), Truckline Cafe (1946), and All My Sons (1947).

== Film ==
In February 1936, soon after signing a contract with Universal Pictures, Kalish was "being hailed as an Elizabeth Bergner type", and the studio had plans to change her name. By March 30, 1936, she was known as Ann Preston.

Her film debut came when she had the female lead in Parole! (1936), after which she appeared in Magnificent Brute (1936). Later in 1936, she had a new studio and another new name. After she signed with RKO Pictures, officials at that studio changed her name to Judith Blake. At RKO, she had a supporting role in Wanted: Jane Turner (1936).

== Radio and television ==
In 1935, Kalish joined the casts of the radio programs Eyes of Youth, Masquerade and Nickelodeon. She played "most of the heavy parts" in Lights Out, portrayed Betty Fairfield in Jack Armstrong, the All-American Boy, and was a member of the casts of The First Nighter Program and Grand Hotel.

Billed as Ann Shepherd, Kalish played the title character in the soap opera Joyce Jordan, Girl Interne. played "Hope Melton Evans" on Big Sister, and portrayed Pearl Sutton on Just Plain Bill. She was also a regular on Everyman's Theater,, Green Valley, U.S.A., and Hilda Hope, M.D.

In the 1970s, she returned to radio to perform in episodes of CBS Radio Mystery Theater. She reprised the role of "Hope Melton Evans" on October 9, 1945 in an experimental CBS television broadcast of Big Sister. On April 18, 1945, she performed in an experimental TV variety program, Women in Wartime, also on CBS.

Kalish made appearances in three episodes ("Salt of the Earth", "The Midway", "Terror in the Streets") of the ABC series Actors Studio. In 1951, she appeared in two episodes ("The Fatal Step", "The Undertaker Calls") of the CBS anthology series Danger. Later, in 1952, she appeared in the premiere episode ("Bury Her Deep") of the WOR-TV New York series Dark Destiny.

== Personal life ==
Kalish was married to director Charles K. Freeman, who also was her manager. Later she married actor and director Yisrol Paul Mann Libman. During that marriage, she was known as Jennie Shaludel Libman and Ann Shepherd Mann.

== Death ==
On November 30, 2002, Shepherd died in Chatham County, North Carolina, aged 92. She was then known as Ann Kalish Sheps.
