= So Big =

So Big may refer to:

- So Big (novel), a 1924 novel written by Edna Ferber
- So Big (1924 film), a 1924 film adaptation directed by Charles Brabin
- So Big (1932 film), a 1932 film adaptation starring Barbara Stanwyck
- So Big (1953 film), a 1953 film adaptation directed by Robert Wise
- So Big! (book), a Sesame Street spin-off book, see Sesame Beginnings
- "So Big" (song), a song by Iyaz
