= Sandra Michael =

American radio soap opera writer

- Born: Anna Marie Mikkelsen; May 20, 1906; Aarhus, Denmark
- Died: August 29, 2003 (aged 97); Rancho Santa Fe, San Diego County, California, U.S.
- Education: University of Illinois, University of Chicago
- Occupations: radio soap opera writer; radio host/announcer; radio actor; television writer
- Spouse: John Gibbs (m. 1935; died 1997)
- Writing career
- Language: English

Sandra Michael (born Anna Marie Mikkelsen; May 20, 1906 – August 29, 2003) was an American writer—and sometimes host/announcer or actor—who had a relatively brief but high-profile career spent primarily in old-time radio, best known for creating ambitious daytime dramas (she disdained the term "soap opera"). Most notable among these was Against the Storm, which, in 1942, became the first and only daytime radio drama to ever win a Peabody Award.

== Life and career ==
Born in Denmark and raised in Lewistown, Montana and Chicago, Illinois, Michael was one of four children born to Jens Mikkelsen and Catherine Nørgård. She attended the University of Illinois and University of Chicago.

In 1935, Michael hosted The House Party on WGN in Chicago.

Looking back on her signature work, Against the Storm, in a series of articles written in 1948 for The New Yorker, James Thurber wrote, "Its success was immediate and, for a soap opera, phenomenal. [...] Its prose, often sensitive, occasionally poetic, was a startling change from the general run of factory-made wordage. So was its aware, realistic, and outspoken story. It was concerned with a college professor alive to the dangers of Fascism and plagued by the complacency and opposition of his colleagues. It became the only daytime serial ever to win one of the George Foster Peabody awards for radio excellence, given annually by the University of Georgia. 'Against the Storm' was canceled in 1942. The reason for its closing is still a controversial issue. The Michaels insist that pressure was brought to bear by the agency to make it more like a typical daytime show, and that Sandra asked that her contract be terminated. The agency contends that the plot ran its course in the first two years and that the serial then deteriorated into a series of charming vignettes peopled by interesting and worthy personalities, with just no story line left. At any rate, the large number of listeners this program had originally attracted began to decrease steadily, according to figures of the Crossley system of audience research subscribed to at that time by the sponsor of the show."

== Personal life and death ==
On September 10, 1935, Michael, as Anna Marie Mickelsen, married her future producer, John Geibish (aka Gibbs). They remained married until his death, on February 6, 1997.

On August 29, 2003, at age 97, Michael died of undisclosed causes in Rancho Santa Fe, San Diego County, California.

== Legacy ==
In 1967, radio historian Jim Harmon sought to articulate what it was that set Michael apart from her better known contemporaries.

Michael was a writer who dealt in matters of stronger import, perhaps the only matters of any genuine import ever in a daytime soap opera. Her writings were often gentle and poetic and struck a note of realism and truth missing from the work of the financially more successful Elaine Carrington and Frank and Anne Hummert. Just as Louis Armstrong might do, she took a simple, trite melody and for a fleeting note blew a note too clean and sweet to last.

== Works ==
=== Radio ===
Year	Title	Role	Notes
1935–?	House Party	Host	
1935–1938	Monticello Party Line	Creator, writer	
1938–?	Valiant Lady	Creator, writer	
1938–1940	The Affairs of Anthony	Creator, writer	
1939—	1001 Wives	Writer	Alternating with writers Fayette Krum, Al Barker and William Hodapp
1939	The Story of Mary Marlin	Writer	Substituted that summer for the show's creator, a vacationing Jane Crusinberry.
1939–1942, 1949–1952	Against the Storm	Creator, writer	
1940	Lone Journey	Creator, writer	
October 9, 1942	The Kate Smith Show; Ep. "My Brother in Stalingrad"	Writer	With Margaret Webster, Selena Royle and Hester Sondergaard
1943–1944	The Open Door	Creator, writer	
October 29, 1943	Who Is Charlie?	Creator, writer	Original half-hour radio drama produced by CBS to benefit the National War Fund, featuring Orson Welles as narrator.
January 29, 1950	Unborn Child	Creator, writer	

=== Television ===
Year	Title	Role	Notes
May 25, 1953	Robert Montgomery Presents	Original teleplay	Episode, "All Things Glad and Beautiful"
November 23, 1953	Robert Montgomery Presents	Original teleplay	Episode, "Harvest"
February 22, 1954	Robert Montgomery Presents	Adaptation	Episode, "Land of Happiness"
December 6, 1954	Robert Montgomery Presents	Original teleplay	Episode, "Fairyland Clinic" aka "Dr. Ed"
March 1, 1955	Robert Montgomery Presents	Original teleplay	Episode, "Such a Busy Day Tomorrow"
December 26, 1955	Robert Montgomery Presents	Original teleplay	Episode, "The Second Day of Christmas"
August 6, 1956	Robert Montgomery Presents	Original teleplay	Episode, "Maybe Tomorrow"
