= Roger De Koven =

American actor (1906–1988)

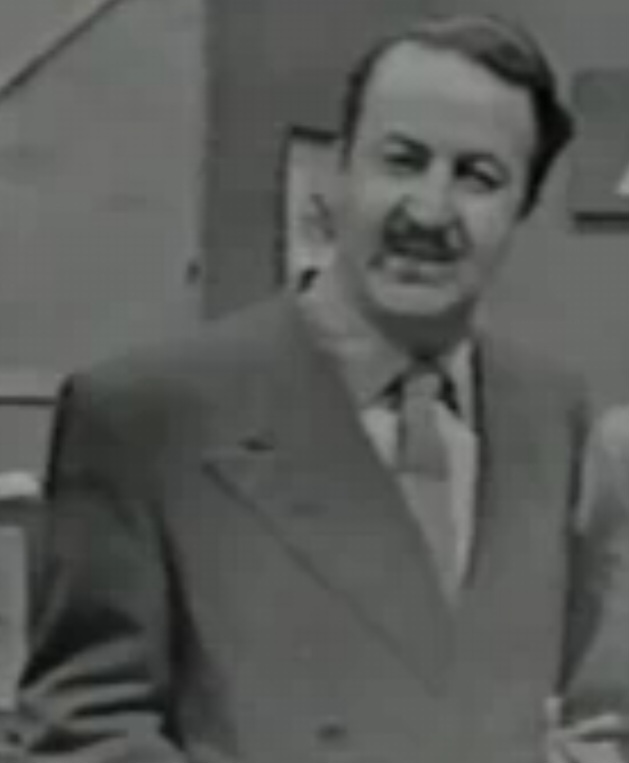
- De Koven in an episode of Tales of Tomorrow (1952)
- Born: Roger Bemet DeKoven; October 22, 1907; Chicago, Illinois, U.S.
- Died: January 28, 1988 (aged 80); Manhattan, New York City, U.S.
- Other names: Roger DeKoven, Roger de Koven
- Occupation: Actor
- Years active: 1925–1984
- Spouse: Mina Meltz
- Children: 2

Roger De Koven (born Roger Bemet DeKoven; October 22, 1907 – January 28, 1988) was an American actor on stage, radio, television and film, known for his versatility, and, in particular, for his portrayals of Florenz Ziegfeld Jr. in the Broadway musical, Funny Girl, and of Professor Jason Allen in the landmark anti-war—and anti-Nazi—radio drama Against the Storm. H appeared frequently on Grand Central Station, Dimension X, and Yours Truly, Johnny Dollar, and—while employed as leading man/director of a stock company in the mid-1930s—directed the young Danny Kaye.

== Early life and career ==
A native of Chicago, Illinois, DeKoven was one of seven children born to Bernard DeKoven and Clara Turner. His father was a Russian-born Jew known for his active participation in Zionist affairs and Jewish charitable work.

Following his graduation from John Marshall High School, DeKoven attended the University of Chicago, Northwestern, and Columbia. He made his Broadway debut in 1926 in Franz Werfel's Juarez and Maximilian. That same year, De Koven performed with Moscow's Habima Theatre troupe during their tour of the US.

In 1940, De Koven appeared at The New School for Social Research in Shakespeare's King Lear (the first American production staged by the school's founder, Erwin Piscator), playing Edmund to Sam Jaffe's Lear.

Variety's Tom Morse, at the conclusion of his article assessing Off Broadway's 1965–1966 season, includes de Koven's performance in Deadly Game—an adaptation of Swiss writer Friedrich Dürrenmatt's A Dangerous Game—in his list of the year's outstanding performances. Of his performance as Paul Hirsch in the touring company of Leonard Spigelgass's Dear Me, the Sky is Falling, reviewed at the Tappan Zee Playhouse, Nyack Journal-News critic Mariruth Campbell writes, "DeKoven [...] gives the role wondrous value by impressing the audience with Paul's basic solidity while seemingly the too-easily led marriage partner. He clearly shows Paul admires as well as adores his fix-it mama." Regarding De Koven's portrayal of Justice Lawrence Walgrave in a 1969 production of Agatha Christie's 10 Little Indians, Home News drama critic Ernest Albrecht notes, "DeKoven is particularly good at making an enormous change in character go down without our gagging on it."

== Personal life and death ==
From June 6, 1927, DeKoven was married to the former Mina Meltz. They had two children.

On January 28, 1988, DeKoven died of cancer at his home in Manhattan.

== Acting credits ==
=== Stage ===
| Opening date | Closing date | Title | Role | Theatre | Notes | Refs |
|---|---|---|---|---|---|---|
| Jan 26, 1927 | Apr 1927 | The Mystery Man | Anson | Nora Bayes Theatre | | |
| Mar 20, 1936 | Apr 1936 | Murder in the Cathedral | First Knight | Manhattan Theatre | Written by T.S. Eliot; music by A. Lehman Engel | |
| Jan 7, 1937 | May 15, 1937 | The Eternal Road | Fanatic | Manhattan Opera House | Music by Kurt Weill; text by Franz Werfel. Adapted by William A. Drake, from translation by Ludwig Lewisohn; staged by Max Reinhardt. | |
| Dec 21, 1941 | Feb 7, 1942 | Brooklyn, U.S.A. | Albert | Forrest Theatre | Written by John Bright and Asa Bordages. | |
| Oct 17, 1945 | Oct 27, 1945 | The Assassin | Admiral Marcel Vespery | National Theatre | Written by Irwin Shaw | |
| Nov 16, 1946 | May 10, 1947 | Joan of Lorraine | Jeffson | Alvin Theatre | Written by Maxwell Anderson; produced by The Playwrights' Company | |
| Nov 18, 1954 | Dec 4, 1954 | Abie's Irish Rose | Dr. Jacob Samuels | Holiday Theatre | Written by Anne Nichols | |
| Nov 17, 1955 | Jun 2, 1956 | The Lark | The Promoter | Longacre Theatre | Written by Jean Anouilh; book adapted by Lillian Hellman; incidental music by Leonard Bernstein. | |
| Jan 23, 1957 | Mar 16, 1957 | The Hidden River | Dr. Montalti | Playhouse Theatre | Written by Ruth Goetz and Augustus Goetz, based on the novel by Storm Jameson; directed by Robert Lewis. | |
| Oct 24, 1957 | Feb 22, 1958 | Compulsion | Ferdinand Feldscher | Ambassador Theatre | Adapted from his novel of the same name by Meyer Levin; late made into like-named film. | |
| Oct 19, 1959 | Jul 1, 1961 | The Miracle Worker | Doctor | Playhouse Theatre | Written by Anton Chekhov; translation by Constance Garnett | |
| Dec 8, 1959 | Feb 20, 1960 | The Fighting Cock | The Milkman | ANTA Playhouse | Lucienne Hill's adaptation of Jean Anouilh's play | |
| Mar 18, 1963 | Nov 9, 1963 | Tovarich | Gorotchenko - Replacement (May 27, 1963 - ?) | Civic Repertory Theatre | Musical based on the comedy by Robert E. Sherwood and Jacques Deval; | |
| Nov 11, 1963 | Nov 16, 1963 | Arturo Ui | The Actor | Lunt-Fontanne Theatre | Written by Bertolt Brecht; book adapted by George Tabori; incidental music by Jule Styne; directed by Tony Richardson | |
| Mar 26, 1964 | Jul 1, 1967 | Funny Girl | Florenz Ziegfeld Jr. | Winter Garden Theatre, Majestic Theatre, Broadway Theatre | Jule Styne-Bob Merrill musical with book by Isobel Lennart, based on her original story; directed by Garson Kanin | |
| Jan 4, 1968 | Feb 10, 1968 | Saint Joan | The Archbishop of Rheims | Vivian Beaumont Theatre | Written by George Bernard Shaw | |
| Feb 29, 1938 | Apr 6, 1968 | Tiger at the Gates | Priam | Vivian Beaumont Theatre | Adapted by Christopher Fry from Jean Giradoux's play. | |
| Apr 25, 1968 | Jun 8, 1968 | Cyrano de Bergerac | Jodelet, A Spanish Officer | Vivian Beaumont Theatre | Written by Edmond Rostand; book adapted by James Forsyth; incidental music by William Bolcom. | |
| Nov 30, 1976 | Dec 5, 1976 | Herzl | Jacob Herzl | Palace Theatre | Written by Benjamin Glazer and Vicki Baum | |
| Nov 14, 1979 | May 18, 1980 | Strider | Vaska/ Mr. Willingstone | Helen Hayes Theatre | Written by Mark Rozovsky, adapted from "Kholstomer: The Story of a Horse" by Leo Tolstoy | |

=== Radio ===
| Year | Title | Role | Notes |
|---|---|---|---|
| 1938–1944 | Myrt and Marge | Randy Greenspring | |
| 1939–? | The O'Neills | Chris Mamanos | |
| 1939–1942, 1949–1950, 1951–1952 | Against the Storm | Professor Jason McKinley Allen | |
| 1940 | Amanda of Honeymoon Hill | Charlie Harris | |
| | Grand Central Station | | |
| December 31, 1940 | Ep. | NA | With Arline Blackburn, Alan Reed, DeKoven |
| 1941–1946 | Famous O. Henry Jury Trials | Narrator | |
| February 25, 1941 | Ep. | NA | Starring Sidney Lumet, w/ Florence Edney, Everett Sloane, DeKoven, Katherine Locke, Richard Kollmar |
| February 13, 1942 | Ep. | NA | Starring Sonya Stokowski, w/ Hugh Marlowe, DeKoven, Bill Johnstone and Sam Roskyn |
| 1942 | Abie's Irish Rose | Rabbi Samuels (aka Dr. Samuels) | Succeeded Richard Gordon and preceded Martin Wolfson, beginning in April 1942 and finishing sometime that year. |
| 1942 | Suspense; Ep. "The Ketler Method" | Dr. Ketler | |
| 1942–? | The Anderson's | NA | Co-starring with Elizabeth Watts |
| 1942–? | The Man Behind the Gun | | |
| 1942 | This We Have Done | | |
| 1943–? | Men at Sea | | |
| 1943–? | Words at War | | |
| 1943–1944 | Brave Tomorrow | Hal Lambert | |
| 1943 | Manhunt | | |
| 1943–1944 | Stella Dallas | Count Rudolph Tulana | |
| 1943–1952 | The Mysterious Traveler | Various roles | |
| 1944 | Voice of the Army; Ep. "Memorial Day, 1944" | NA | "[P]ays tribute to members of the Women's Army Corps and the Army Nurse Corps." Also feat. Ted Osborn, Lesley Woods, Jone Allison, Michael Fitzmaurice; written by Louis Pelletier |
| 1945 | The Living People | NA | Mini-Series of six weekly 15-minute transcriptions which aired during Lent in February and March 1945. |
| 1945–? | The Strange Romance of Evelyn Winters | | |
| 1945–? | Gang Busters | Narrator | |
| 1945–1946; 1950- | Road of Life | Dr. Fraser; Reid Overton | |
| 1946–? | The Schools Are Yours | Tom Webber | |
| 1947–? | This Is Nora Drake | Andrew King | |
| August 30, 1947 | Ep. | NA | Starring Helen Claire, w/ Sydney Smith, DeKoven, Kathleen Cordell |
| October 30, 1948 | Ep. "The Millionth Guest" | NA | Starring Arnold Moss, w/ Leif Ericson, Richard Newton, Viola Roache, Philippa Bevans, DeKoven |
| June 1, 1950 | Hallmark Playhouse; Ep. "Crossroads of America" | NA | |
| August 11, 1952 | Crime Does Not Pay; Ep. "The Lady Loves Kittens" | NA | |
| 1952–1953 | Police Blotter | | 5-minute "capsule thriller" starring DeKoven. |
| October 1952 | The Eternal Light; Ep. "The Song of Berditchev" | Levi Yitzchok of Berditchev | |
| December 30, 1976 | Radio Mystery Theater; Ep. "Your Move, Mr. Ellers" | Tim Whelan (the "snoopy insurance investigator") | |

=== Film ===
| Year | Title | Role | Director | Other cast members | Notes | Refs. |
|---|---|---|---|---|---|---|
| 1943 | The Promise | | | Eleonora Von Mendelssohn (as Eleanora Mendelssohn) | Short subject "starring Eleanora Mendelssohn and Roger DeKoven" | |
| 1945 | A Pass to Tomorrow | Himself - Narrator | Joseph Krumgold | Fredric March | March and De Koven narrate this 28-min Technicolor documentary produced for the United Palestine Appeal | |
| 1951 | Up Front | Sabatelli | Alexander Hall | Tom Ewell, David Wayne | | |
| 1961 | Something Wild | NA (uncredited) | Jack Garfein | Carroll Baker, Ralph Meeker | | |
| 1974 | Seizure | Serge | Oliver Stone | Jonathan Frid, Martine Beswick, Hervé Villechaize | | |

=== Television ===
| Year | Title | Role | Notes | Refs. |
|---|---|---|---|---|
| 1943 | | NA | A Christmas Carol | |
| 1949 | The Big Story | NA | "Frank Shenkel of the Pittsburgh Sun Telegraph" | |
| 1957 | Camera Three | Imre Nagy | "The United Nations Hungarian Report" | |
| 1958 | The Investigator | NA | | |
| 1958 | Camera Three | Social man | "The Necessity for Solitude" | |
| 1961 | The Detectives | NA | "One Lucky Break" | |
| 1962 | Alfred Hitchcock Presents | Nate | "A Piece of the Action" | |
| 1965 | Eavesdrop | Himself | 3/28 episode of local talk show on KDKA-TV, Pittsburgh, hosted by Marie Torre and Bill Burns | |
| March 12, 1967 | The Vine | NA (voice only) | Life of Christ recreated with strictly non-pros onscreen; other actors heard inc. Douglass Watson, John Heffernan, Nancy Marchand, Whitfield Connor and Barnard Hughes. | |
| 1978 | Trial in Heaven | NA | "A Fable for the Day of Atonement" starring Lou Jacobi, with De Koven, Albert M. Ottenheimer, Jacqueline Brookes, Marilyn Chris | |
| 1979 | Guiding Light | NA (an "international type") | | |
