= Valiant Lady (radio series) =

American radio soap opera

- Other names: The Valiant Lady
- Running time: 15 minutes
- Country of origin: United States
- Language: English
- Home station: WGN
- Syndicates: ABC; CBS; NBC
- TV adaptations: Valiant Lady
- Announcer: Art Millet; Dwight Weist
- Written by: Ruth Borden; Basil Loughrane; Sandra Michael; Addy Richton; Lynn Stone; Lawrence Klee; Howard Teichman
- Directed by: Ted Corday; Roy Lockwood; Ernest Ricca; Rikel Kent
- Produced by: Basil Loughrane; Wynn Orr; Dan Sutter
- Original release: January 3, 1938 (WGN); March 7, 1938 (CBS) – February 29, 1952
- Opening theme: "Estrellita"

Valiant Lady is an American radio soap opera that was broadcast on ABC, CBS, and NBC at various times from March 7, 1938, through August 23, 1946, and later between October 8, 1951, and February 19, 1952.

== Characteristics ==
Episodes of Valiant Lady were introduced with the summary: "... the story of a woman and her brilliant but unstable husband -- the story of her struggle to keep his feet firmly planted on the pathway to success." The main character was "an actress who relinquishes her career to marry Truman Scott, a noted plastic surgeon." Because "Truman was extremely jealous and unstable," the story centered on "efforts to guide his life."

A 1946 article in the trade publication Broadcasting noted:

General Mills' radio shows are beamed at all class levels and all age groups. But each character, from Valiant Lady to the Lone Ranger, has a common denominator: financially they are neither poor nor rich, but just right. They also belong to no one church and to no one segment of society. They are, in essence, the radio counterpart of "Everyman," with heavy accent on virtues that inspire listeners to become better mentally, morally and physically.

Joan Blaine, the program's star for most of its time on the air, wrote in a 1942 Pittsburgh Press article:

We, in radio, are all specialty artists. Valiant Lady is content to deal with the stories of ordinary Americans, and not so ordinary when you get into their lives. We leave more complex drama treatment to other programs.

In a 1943 article in The Milwaukee Journal, Blaine commented that Valiant Lady "deals with current issues — all substantial contemporary material."

== Origin ==
Valiant Lady was created by Frank and Anne Hummert. General Mills test-marketed the program on WGN in Chicago, Illinois, beginning January 3, 1938. An article in a trade publication noted that the tentative title Magnificent Lady had been changed to the permanent title Valiant Lady. Initial cast members were Joan Blaine, Francis X. Bushman, Sally Agnes Smith and Olan Soule. The author was Sandra Michaels.

== Networks ==
Beginning March 7, 1938, after two months of testing on WGN, Valiant Lady was moved to CBS to be broadcast "five mornings weekly," replacing Hollywood in Person as part of the Gold Medal Hour. The 15-minute program continued to originate in Chicago.

On May 30, 1938, General Mills moved Valiant Lady and four other programs from CBS to NBC. By that time, Valiant Lady was originating from New York City. General Mills ended its sponsorship of the Valiant Lady and Light of the World effective August 23, 1946, citing "government restrictions on wheat and labor difficulties"; the programs advertised Gold Medal Flour and Cheerios, respectively. An article in a trade publication estimated, "Cancellation means a $1,000,000 loss in billing for CBS."

== Personnel ==
Joan Blaine was the star, playing "an actress with a wide assortment of personal problems" who gave up her acting career to care for her injured father. The character's name is given in various old-time radio reference works as Joan Blake, Joan Barrett, Joan Scott, and Joan Hargrave-Scott. Blaine's importance to the program was such that she received "billing up front before the title."

The program's characters and the actors and actresses who played them are as follows. (Source except as noted.)

Character	Actor/Actress
The Valiant Lady	Joan Blaine; Joan Banks; Florence Freeman
Jim Barrett	Richard Gordon; Bill Johnstone; Gene Leonard
Mike Hagen	Teddy Bergman; Parker Fennelly; Bill Adams
Mr. Wright	Teddy Bergman
Paul Morrison	Raymond Edward Johnson
Emma Stevens	Judith Lowry
Agnes Westcott	Linda Carlon
Estelle Cummings	Elsie Mae Gordon
Clarissa Clarke	Ethel Intropidi
Edward Curran	Adelaide Klein
Mr. Collins	Dwight Weist
Mr. Barclay	Maurice Tarplin
Grace Wilson	Jeannette McGrady
Norman Price	Albert Hayes
Mr. Carson	Bernard Lenrow
Judge Kruger	Jerry Macy
Mr. Trent	Sidney Slon
Lilienthal	Milton Herman
Billy	Kingsley Colton; Jackie Grimes
Abbey Trowbridge	Ethel Owen
Dudley Trowbridge	Shirling Oliver
Carla Scott	Elsa Grsi
Emilio	Luis van Rooten
Mrs. Scott	Charme Allen
Dr. Lanson	James Trantor
Oliver	Jackie Kelk
Lafe Simms	Lawson Zerbe
Thomas R. Clark	Charles Webster
Jeffrey Clark	Lawson Zerbe
Margie Cook	Jean Ellyn
Mrs. Evans	Kate McComb
Nelson, the butler	A.T. Kaye
Eleanor Richards	Elspeth Eric
Mr. Richards	Everett Sloane
Lester Brennan	Everett Sloane
Jolly Rogers	Clifford Stork; Craig McDonnell
Pamela Stanley	Ethel Intropidi
Dr. Abendroth	William Shelley
Dr. Alec Gordon	Eric Dressler
Myra Gordon	Irene Winston
Mrs. Scott	Charlotte Garrity
Dr. Truman "Tubby" Scott	Charles Carroll; Bartlett Robinson; Martin Blaine
Monica Brewster	Cathleen Cordell
Colin Kirby	Ned Wever
Amy Bingham	Elaine Kent
Pixie Jefferys	Joan Lazer
Dr. Christopher Ellerbe	Frank Lovejoy
Norman Price Sr.	John Brewster
Edward Curran	Santos Ortega
Ivy Lane	Joan Vitez
Dr. Malcolm Donaldson	Julian Noa
Jack Eastman	Ralph Bell
Mrs. Hunter	Blanche Yurka
Mrs. Selby	Eleanore Audley

Others who acted in the program over the years included Vivian Holt, Sue Reed, Richard Sanders, Florence Malone, Barbara Lee, Arthur Elmer, Gilbert Mack, Roy Fant, Ray Morgan, Louise Larabee, Jackson Beck, Howard St. John, George Herman, and Aileen Poe.

Announcers were Art Millet and Dwight Weist, and the organists were Jesse Crawford and Theodore Wick.

Directors were Ted Corday, Basil Loughrane, Roy Lockwood, Ernest Ricca, and Rikel Kent. Writers were Sandra Michael, Ruth Borden, Addy Richton, Lynn Stone, Lawrence Klee, and Howard Teichman. Laughrane was also the producer for part of the program's run. Other producers were Dan Sutter and Wynn Orr.
