= Snow Village Sketches =

Comedy-drama radio series broadcast from 1928 to 1946

Snow Village Sketches, aka Soconyland Sketches, was a comedy-drama radio series broadcast on three different networks from 1928 to 1946.

Beginning February 29, 1928, on NBC, Socony Oil sponsored Soconyland Sketches, scripted by William Ford Manley (1896–1954). The series featured Arthur Allen and Parker Fennelly as rural New England farmers. Socony continued to sponsor the show when it moved to CBS on October 16, 1934, and was retitled Snow Village Sketches. It continued on CBS until May 21, 1935.

Loose Wiles Biscuit was the sponsor for a run on NBC from October 3, 1936, to June 26, 1937, broadcast on Saturday evenings. During the early years of World War II, Procter & Gamble sponsored the series as a weekday quarter-hour serial, airing from December 28, 1942, to November 12, 1943. The final series was heard on Sunday mornings on the Mutual Broadcasting System from January 13 to June 16, 1946.

The stories took place in the small New Hampshire community of Snow Village where truant officer Hiram Neville (Parker Fennelly), a man of old-fashioned values, often encountered game warden Dan'l Dickey (Arthur Allen) and Dan'l's wife, Hattie Dickey (Agnes Young, Kate McComb).

Scripter Manley lived in Snowville, New Hampshire, named after the Snow family who had operated a sawmill there in 1825. In the mid-1930s, because of the radio program, Snowville temporarily changed its name to Snow Village.
