= Against the Storm (radio program) =

- The poet John Masefield portrayed himself in Against the Storm. (Photograph by E.O. Hoppé)
- Genre: Daytime Serial, Drama
- Running time: 15 min
- Country of origin: USA
- Language: English
- Syndicates: NBC Red, MBS, ABC
- Starring: Gertrude Warner, Arnold Moss, Roger DeKoven, Joan Alexander
- Announcer: Ralph Edwards, Richard Stark
- Created by: Sandra Michael
- Written by: Sandra Michael
- Directed by: Axel Gruenberg
- Recording studio: New York, NY
- Original release: 1939 – 1952
- No. of series: 3
- Audio format: Mono
- Opening theme: The Song of Bernadette
- Other themes: Ich Liebe Dich
- Sponsored by: Ivory, Philip Morris
- Podcast: Stream from Archive.org

Against the Storm is a radio daytime drama which had three separate runs over a 13-year period; the initial run was on the NBC Red Network from October 16, 1939, to December 25, 1942, with revivals of the series on Mutual from April 25 to October 21, 1949, and ABC from October 1, 1951, to June 27, 1952. Created and written by Sandra Michael, the drama was the only daytime radio serial to ever win a Peabody Award, for "Outstanding Entertainment in Drama" in 1941.

The program pivoted around the activities of Professor Jason McKinley Allen (Roger DeKoven, who starred in all three runs), his wife, daughters and friends. Allen, who lived in Hawthorne, Connecticut, at Deep Pool Farm, taught classes at the fictional Harper University.

With Allen an outspoken pacifist, war resistance and the dangers of fascism were underlying themes, and his position as a professor made it possible for Sandra Michael to incorporate literature and poetry readings into her storylines. In one memorable episode, a shortwave broadcast from England enabled real-life Poet Laureate John Masefield to speak in Allen's fictional classroom.

Axel Gruenberg directed Sandra Michael's scripts. The show's theme music was by Alfred Newman, taken from his score for The Song of Bernadette.

Variety praised a 1941 episode about a girl refugee seeing the skyscrapers of Manhattan as "one of the most distinguished and stirring broadcasts in the history of commercial daytime radio."

The serial's title was taken from King Lear: "... disconnect in watching Lear rage against the storm in a sun-drenched redwood... His rage against the storm and decline into madness are laced with lightning..."

Ed Downes was the director.

== Listen to ==
- Against the Storm in the Internet Archive's Old-Time Radio Collection

== See also ==
- List of radio soaps
