= Elinor Harriot =

American actress

Elinor Harriot (born Elinor Harriet Hirschfield; August 30, 1910 - June 10, 2000) was an American actress who became active in education and civic affairs after she left acting.

== Early years ==
Harriot was born Elinor Harriet Hirschfield in Duluth, Minnesota. Her father was a doctor, and her mother was a teacher. She had two older sisters. She was taught voice and elocution from an early age, and her performance in a high school play led to her being hired to act with a touring stock company when she was 17 years old. She attended the University of Wisconsin (UW) for one year.

== Career ==
Harriot's career began in Louisville, Kentucky, when she started performing with a theater troupe. In 1930–31, Harriot was the ingenue with a stock company in Lexington, Kentucky.

During the Great Depression, Don Ameche (a friend from Harriot's year at UW), turned her interest to radio. She portrayed Dorothy Wright on The Couple Next Door and acted on the daily shows Bachelor's Children, Backstage Wife, in addition to being an announcer. In 1935, she began acting on Amos 'n' Andy, providing the voices of Amos's wife, Amos's baby, Mrs. Kingfish, and a 6-year-old girl. She was the first regular cast member on the show other than Freeman Gosden and Charles Correll, who portrayed the title characters. Harriot was selected because of her "authentic southern accent" and ability to take direction. She left the program in 1937 because of her marriage, but she returned in 1943 and continued in her roles until the series ended in 1955, even though she had dropped other work on radio. Other programs on which Harriot acted included The Story of Mary Marlin, Princess Pat Players.

On Broadway, Harriot performed in The Bride the Sun Shines On and The Bonds of Interest. Harriot's role as a member of a wedding party in The Bride the Sun Shines On led to an unanticipated opportunity for her in 1932. Dorothy Gish, the play's star, collapsed in the theater and was taken to a hospital shortly before a scheduled matinee. Gish's understudy was unprepared, and theater management was about to announce that the performance was canceled. Harriot, however, had been studying Gish's lines and movements because she hoped to become a leading lady. She filled in until Gish was able to return, after which Harriot was made the official understudy. She also received a contract to perform at Lawrence Langer's Country Playhouse in Westport in the summer of 1932.

== Public service ==
When her daughters were in school, Harriot held several offices in the parent-teacher association. Beginning in 1963, she served two terms on the Beverly Hills Board of Education and was president of the board for two years. While she was on the board she helped to abolish school dress codes and remove racial barriers for student and teachers in schools of Beverly Hills.

Harriot campaigned for a bond issue to create the Beverly Hills Library and was a founder of the Friends of the Beverly Hills Library. She also helped to raise funds for the Museum of Contemporary Art in Los Angeles and worked as a volunteer with it. Other community organizations for which she volunteered included Community Relations Conference of Southern California, Helping Hand, Service League, and Urban Coalition.

Beginning in 1971, Harriot was a member of the board of trustees of Pitzer College. She was designated a "trustee for life" after 25 years on the board, and in 1995, the college granted her an honorary degree.

== Personal life and death ==
Harriot was married to Frank Nathan, an insurance executive, and they had two daughters. They had been married 62 years when she died on June 10, 2000, in Beverly Hills, aged 89.
