= Eloise Kummer =

American actress

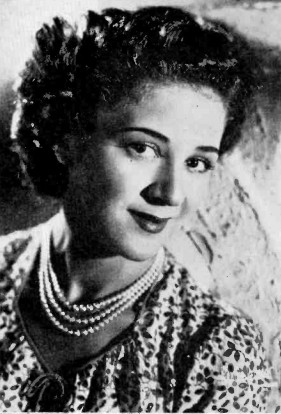
- Kummer (circa 1944)
- Born: June 17, 1916; Sheboygan, Wisconsin
- Died: August 24, 2008 (aged 92)
- Education: University of Wisconsin
- Occupation: Actress
- Known for: Acting in old-time radio
- Spouse: Raymond A. Jones (1946–78; his death)
- Children: 1 son 1 daughter

Margery Eloise Kummer (June 17, 1916 – August 24, 2008) was an American radio and television actress.

== Early years ==
Kummer was born in Sheboygan, Wisconsin, the daughter of Mr. and Mrs. Martin Kummer. After graduating in 1933 from Sheboygan High School, where she won honors in dramatics, she attended the University of Wisconsin, graduating from its School of Speech. Later, working at the perfume counter in a department store in Chicago allowed her to study "manners of speech, reactions, opinions, and characteristics in general" of women. After working in the store, she began acting on radio.

== Career ==
=== Radio ===
In October 1937, Krummer successfully auditioned for a part in Curtain Time and, as a result, appeared in the program's October 15, 1937, broadcast on WGN. A March 11, 1938, newspaper item reported, "Miss Kummer has been heard frequently on programs over Chicago stations ..." By October 2, 1938, she had been chosen as a member of the permanent cast of Fortunes of Emily on WGN.

Kummer's roles on radio programs included those shown in the table below:

Program	Character
American Women	Host-narrator
Backstage Wife	Marcia Mannering
Betty and Bob	Kathy Stone
Dear Mom	Jane
Doctors at Home	Mrs. Riggs
Guiding Light	Norma Greenman
Hot Copy	Patricia Murphy
Island Venture	Nancy
Lone Journey	Nita Bennett
Lora Lawton	Marcia Trevor
The Right to Happiness	Carolyn Allen
Road of Life	Carol Evans
The Story of Mary Marlin	Mary Marlin

In 1957, Kummer was co-host with Josh Brady of two 15-minute daily talk programs on WBBM in Chicago. The Eloise and Josh Show aired in the mornings, and The Josh and Eloise Show was broadcast in the evenings.

She returned to radio drama in 1980, taking the role of Circe in a 12-hour, $1.5 million National Radio Theater production of Homer's Odyssey.

=== Television ===
In 1949, Kummer portrayed Kay Carter on These Are My Children, which has been inaccurately described as the first televised daytime soap opera (it was actually preceded by the DuMont series Faraway Hill in 1946 and Highway to the Stars in 1947), but was the first soap opera strip. Kummer also played Nancy Bennett on The Bennetts.

=== State fair narration ===
In 1962, Kummer recorded the narration for an exhibit at Hawaii's State Fair. The "talking glass lady" was described in an article in the Honolulu Star-Bulletin as "a plexiglass model of a 28-year-old woman." As the exhibit's lighting changed to focus on first one internal organ and then another, Kummer's narration described how each spotlighted organ functioned.

== Personal life ==
On August 3, 1946, in Sheboygan, Wisconsin, Kummer married Raymond A. Jones, an officer of the American Federation of Radio Artists. They had two children and remained married until his death in 1978. Their daughter, Amanda Jones, won the Miss USA title in 1973.
