= So Big (1932 film) =

1932 film

So Big!
- Theatrical release poster
- Directed by: William A. Wellman
- Written by: J. Grubb Alexander; Robert Lord
- Based on: So Big; 1924 novel by Edna Ferber
- Produced by: Jack L. Warner
- Starring: Barbara Stanwyck
- Cinematography: Sidney Hickox
- Edited by: William Holmes
- Music by: W. Franke Harling
- Production company: Warner Bros. Pictures
- Distributed by: Warner Bros. Pictures
- Release date: April 30, 1932
- Running time: 81 minutes
- Country: United States
- Language: English

So Big is a 1932 pre-Code American drama film directed by William A. Wellman and starring Barbara Stanwyck. The screenplay by J. Grubb Alexander and Robert Lord is based on the 1924 Pulitzer Prize-winning novel of the same name, by Edna Ferber.

So Big was the second full-scale screen adaptation of the Ferber novel. The first was a 1924 silent film of the same name directed by Charles Brabin and starring Colleen Moore. A 1953 remake was directed by Robert Wise and starred Jane Wyman. The story was also made as a short in 1930, with Helen Jerome Eddy, Jody K. Lance.

== Plot ==
Following the death of her mother, Selina Peake and her father, Simeon, move to Chicago, where she enrolls in finishing school. Her father is killed, leaving her penniless, and Selina's friend, Julie Hemple, helps her find a job as a schoolteacher in a small Dutch community. Selina moves in with the Poole family and tutors their son Roelf. Selina eventually marries immigrant farmer Pervus De Jong, and gives birth to Dirk, nicknamed "So Big", who becomes the primary focus of her life. When Pervus dies, Selina struggles to keep the farm afloat so she can afford to finance her son's education, hoping he will become an architect.

Dirk becomes involved with a married woman, who arranges for him to get a job as a bond salesman in her husband's firm, making much more money than as an apprentice architect. Eventually he meets and falls in love with unconventional artist Dallas O'Mara, but she refuses to marry him because of his lack of ambition. Roelf, now a renowned sculptor, meets Dirk and, learning Selina is his mother, reunites with his former tutor. She is pleased to know her influence helped mold Roelf's character, even as she accepts her own son's weaknesses and disappointments.

== Cast ==
- Barbara Stanwyck as Selina Peake De Jong
- George Brent as Roelf Pool
- Dickie Moore as Dirk De Jong (younger)
- Bette Davis as Miss Dallas O'Mara
- Mae Madison as Julie Hempel
- Hardie Albright as Dirk De Jong
- Alan Hale, Sr. as Klass Poole
- Earle Foxe as Pervus De Jong
- Robert Warwick as Simeon Peake, gambler
- Dorothy Peterson as Maartje Pool
- Noel Francis as Mabel, a "fancy woman"
- Dick Winslow as Roelf, age 12
- Lionel Belmore as Reverend Dekker (uncredited)
- Olin Howland as Jacob Pogadunk (uncredited)
- John Larkin as Jeff (uncredited)
- Elizabeth Patterson as Mrs. Tebbit (uncredited)

== Production ==
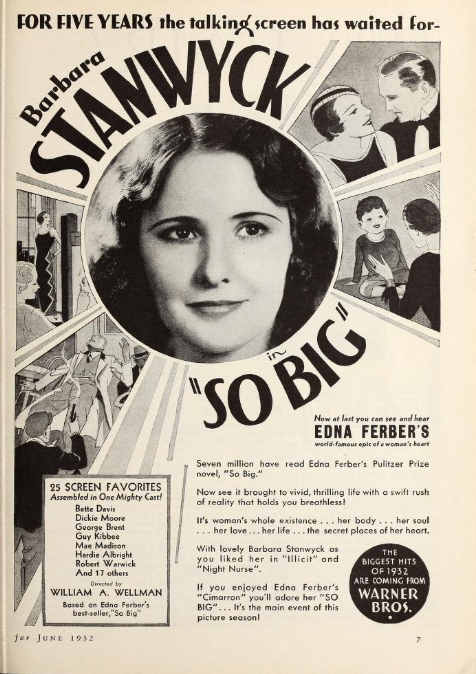
Published by Screenland Magazine, Inc. (1932)

After Cimarron became the top-grossing film of 1931 and won multiple Academy Awards, a newfound interest was spurred in American historical cinema- particularly that of Ferber's. Considered "box-office material", Warner Bros. decided to remake So Big into a talking cinema, paying Ferber an additional $20,000 for sound rights. Despite Hollywood still recovering from its worst year in the Depression, the film underwent production in 1932 with an estimated budget of $228,000 and a solid cast, including well-known actress Barbara Stanwyck. The credit title was shared between Ferber, who was given director approval, and Wellman as the creator of So Big!. The film was shot from January 11 to February 3, finished in just under a month.

This film distinguished itself from the 1924 adaption starring Colleen Moore because screenwriters J. Grubb Alexander and Robert Lord maintained Ferber's theme of art versus materialism. A prevailing issue in 1932, the hardship farmers faced as a result of the crashing stock market, was accurately portrayed by the film, garnering the support of the public. This, alongside a new wave of American historical films (Abraham Lincoln, 1930; Cimarron, 1931; Silver Dollar, 1932) and Ferber's popularity, made the movie a success.

=== Casting ===
Bette Davis, cast in the relatively small role of Dallas O'Mara, filmed So Big! simultaneously with The Rich Are Always with Us. Following The Man Who Played God, it was her second film for Warner Bros., and the first in which she appeared with George Brent, who co-starred with her in eleven more films. Davis considered her casting in a prestigious Barbara Stanwyck project a sign Jack L. Warner was acknowledging her value to the studio. In her 1962 autobiography A Lonely Life, she recalled, "It was a source of tremendous satisfaction, and encouraged me to unheard-of dreams of glory.".

Barbara Stanwyck, a rising star, was brought to even bigger fame with the release of So Big!. A year after her role in So Big!, she starred in Baby Face (1933) and The Bitter Tea of General Yen (1933). Her role as Stella Dallas in the 1936 eponymous film was Academy Award nominated largely due to the role she perfected as a mother in So Big!.

== Critical reception ==
Andre Sennwald of The New York Times called the film "a faithful and methodical treatment of Miss Ferber's novel, but without fire or drama or the vitality of the original." He added, "A fine actress, Miss Stanwyck seems ill-suited to a role that hustles her in jerky steps from girlhood to old age; a role in which she is asked to express rugged grandeur and the beauty of a life well-lived from behind a mask of grease paint ... Little Dickie Moore is delightful as the younger So Big. Bette Davis ... is unusually competent."

Variety noted, "Wellman's endeavor at kaleidoscopic flashes in the life of Selina Dejong ... make for a choppy continuity ... As it is, the 83 minutes are overly long, but in toto, it's a disjointed affair."

The New Yorker considered Barbara Stanwyck's performance "the best work she has yet shown us", while the New York Daily Mirror called her "exquisite" and added, "Her great talent as an actress never has been demonstrated more brilliantly. A sparkling performance. She is magnificent."

Critics of the Motion Picture Herald commented, "Warner has remade Edna Ferber's So Big for the talking screen with Barbara Stanwyck in the virile part of a typical American mother whose simple life epic is the backbone of America's greatness... The Ferber classic should not disappoint those who enjoyed the silent version..."

The film was regarded not only for its great cast and detailed adaptation of the novel, but its unusual plot line for Hollywood movies typical of that time. Commentators praised the film for its "characterization...revelation of plain folk doing the things they think, striving always toward a goal of useful citizenship...It goes back to the days when farm life was drudgery, but it brings it up to the day of the tractor, the radio, the automobile, paved highways and so many other conveniences which have radically altered rural life."
