= Hot Copy =

US radio program

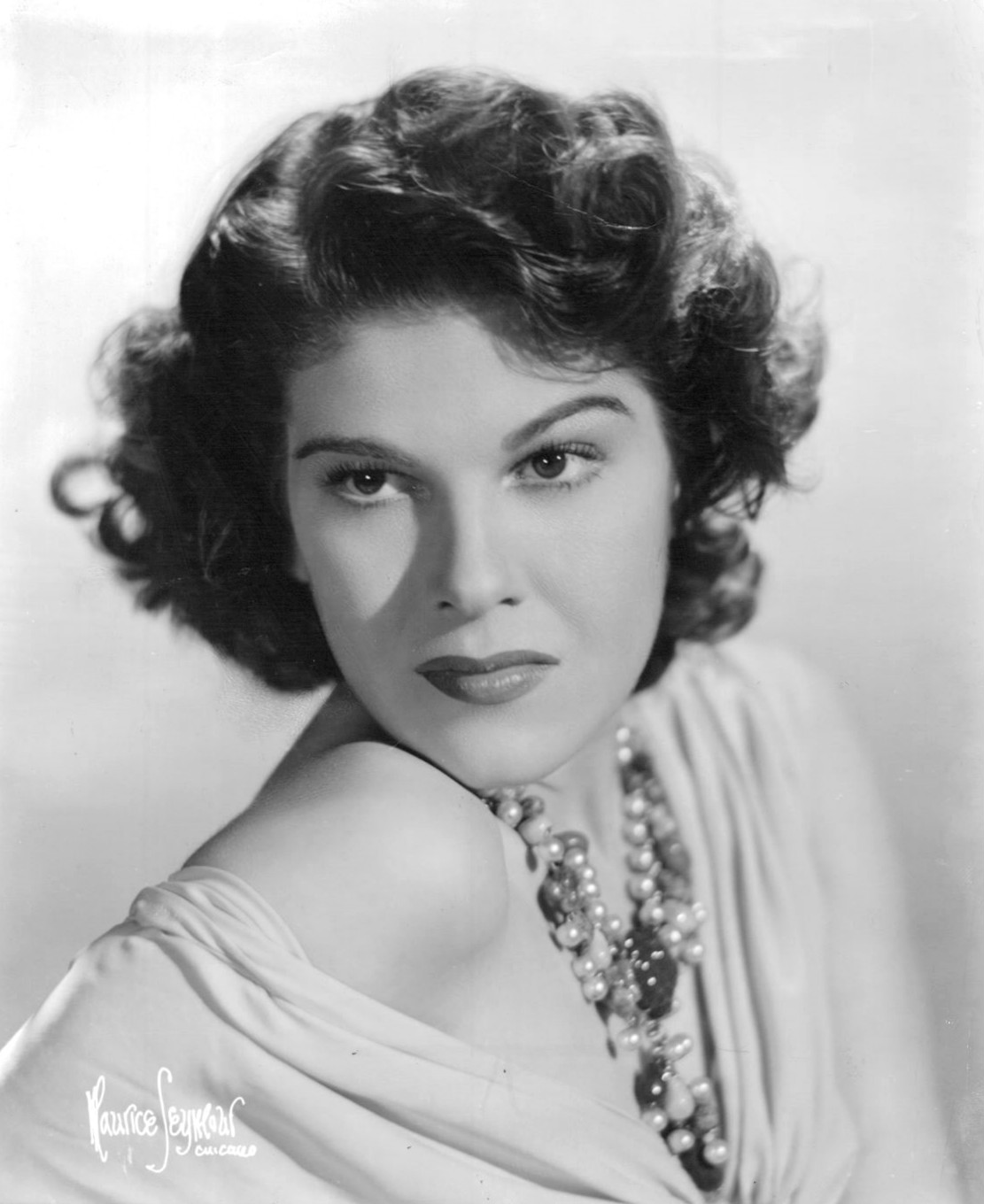
- Betty Lou Gerson was the last actress to star as Anne Rogers in Hot Copy.
- Genre: Mystery drama
- Country of origin: United States
- Language(s): English
- Syndicates: NBC; NBC-Blue
- Starring: Betty Lou Gerson; Eloise Kummer; Fern Persons
- Written by: Nelson Bond; Edwin H. Morse
- Directed by: Wynn Wright; Albert Crews; Burr E. Lee; Martin Magner
- Original release: October 4, 1941 – November 19, 1944
- Sponsored by: O-Cedar (1943 -1944)

Hot Copy is an American old-time radio mystery drama. It was broadcast on NBC from October 4, 1941, until September 26, 1942, and on NBC-Blue from July 18, 1943, until November 19, 1944. It was also carried on stations in Canada.

== Format ==
The program's two-man characters were Anne Rogers and Sergeant Flannigan. Rogers went beyond her profession of being a syndicated newspaper reporter and columnist to investigate crimes, including murders and wartime espionage activities. Flannigan, a police detective, often found himself perplexed as Rogers solved crimes and patiently explained her interpretation of clues.

An article in the October 19, 1944, edition of The Jackson Sun commented about Rogers: "Her search for off-the-record stories brings her in contact with priest and gangster, society matron and panhandler, banker and bum — all the colorful figures which are part of the texture of metropolitan America."

Hot Copy originated in Chicago.

== Personnel ==
Rogers was played by Betty Lou Gerson, Eloise Kummer, and Fern Persons. Flannigan was played by Hugh Rowlands. Directors included Wynn Wright, Albert Crews, Burr E. Lee, and Martin Magner. Writers included Nelson Bond and Edwin H. Morse. Orchestra directors included Roy Shield and Joseph Gallicchio.

== Sponsors ==
O-Cedar sponsored Hot Copy for a year and 13 weeks, ending its support on November 19, 1944.
