= Joan Blaine =

American actress (1900–1949)

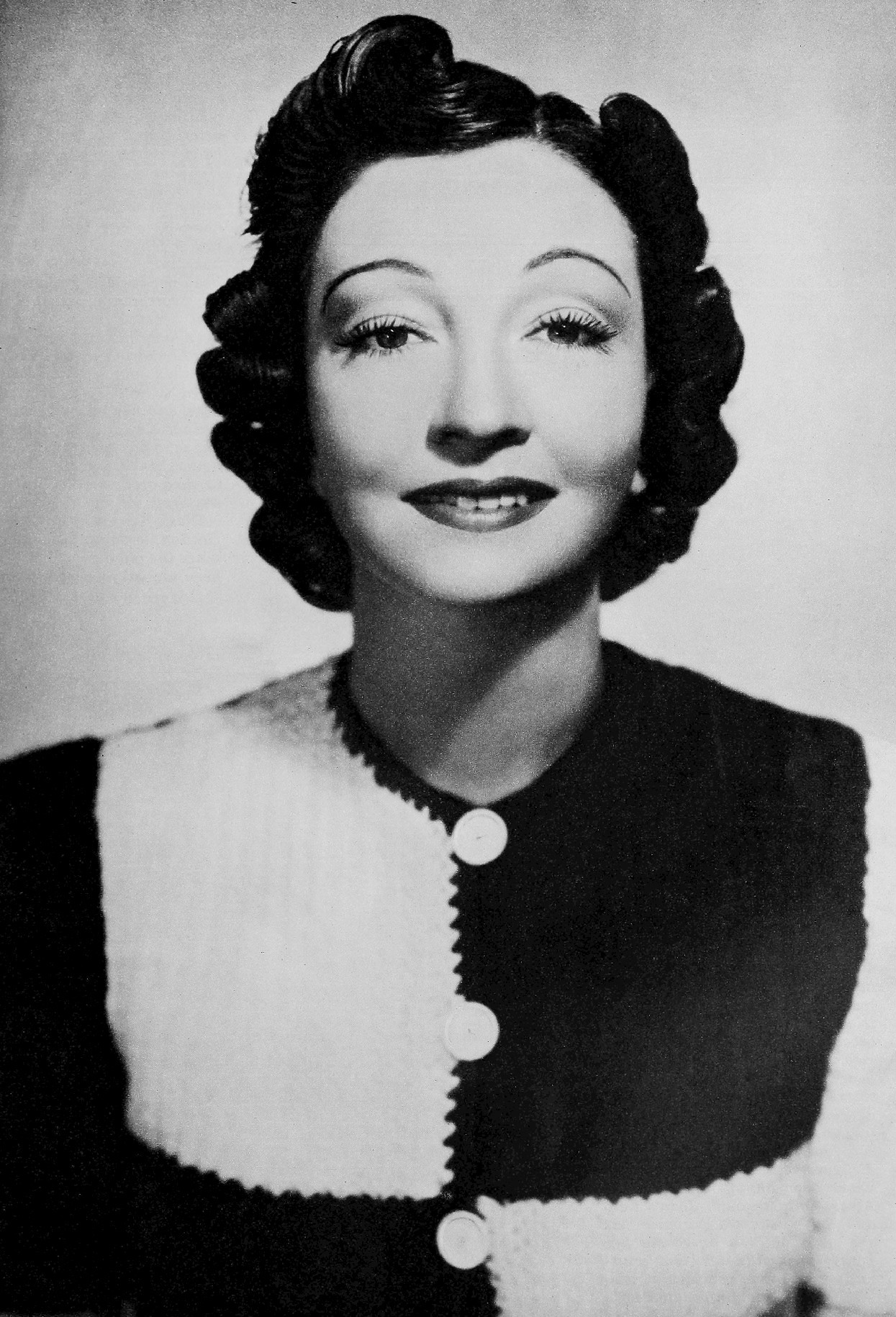
- Blaine in 1942
- Born: April 20, 1900; Fort Dodge, Iowa, U.S.
- Died: April 18, 1949 (aged 48); New York City, U.S.
- Education: Northwestern University
- Occupation: Actress
- Known for: Acting in soap operas on radio
- Spouse: William Pitts

Joan Blaine (April 20, 1900 – April 18, 1949) was an American actress best known for her work in soap operas on old-time radio.

== Early years ==
Blaine was born April 20, ca. 1900 in Fort Dodge, Iowa, and was a descendant of James G. Blaine, a 19th-century American politician who twice was the Republican candidate for president of the United States. Her father was a lawyer.

She graduated from Northwestern University and practiced law in Chicago for a year after receiving her degree. She also attended Columbia University Graduate School of Journalism.

== Radio ==
A 1938 newspaper article described Blaine as "one of radio's leading actresses," and one in 1943 reported, "Joan was acclaimed the most popular daytime radio actress in the country." She was described in one old-time radio reference book as "one of the first real stars of the [soap opera] form, getting billing up front before the title."

One of Blaine's earliest roles on radio was playing the title character in The Story of Mary Marlin, beginning in 1934. She left the program March 26, 1937, "to fulfill a movie contract." She was featured in The House by the Side of the Road in 1934-1935 and had a role called "mysterious guest" in the Edgar Guest Welcome Valley program in 1936.

In 1937, she was featured in We Are Four, a "dramatic serial" on the Mutual Broadcasting System.

She starred in Valiant Lady, beginning March 7, 1938, on CBS, and continued in the lead role of Joan Barrett for most of the program's nine years on the air.

Blaine was also featured in A Tale of Today and Welcome Valley and was the "narrator and reader of prose selections" on Music Magic.

== Stage ==
Blaine had an apprenticeship with the Chicago Theater Guild. She had roles in two Broadway theatre productions -- Mystery Square and The Ghost Parade and appeared in the New York productions Spitfire, And So to Bed, and Winter's Tale. She also portrayed the lead character, Selena Peake, in summer stock theatre productions of So Big.

== Film ==
Blaine appeared in a movie, The Knife.

== Personal life ==
Blaine was married to William Pitts of the Young and Rubicam advertising agency.

== Death ==
Blaine died April 18, 1949, in New York Hospital.

== Radio appearances ==
Year	Program	Episode/source
1934	NBC Armistice Day presentation	A Good Soldier
1942	Stories America Loves	So Big
