= Robert Montgomery Presents =

- Sandra Michael scripted the 1953 Robert Montgomery Presents drama "Harvest" with James Dean and Nancy Sheridan
- Also known as: Robert Montgomery Presents Your Lucky Strike Theater
- Genre: Drama
- Directed by: Vincent J. Donehue; Norman Felton; Perry Lafferty; John Newland; James Sheldon; Herbert B. Swope Jr.
- Presented by: Robert Montgomery
- Country of origin: United States
- Original language: English
- No. of seasons: 8
- No. of episodes: 276

Production
- Executive producer: Robert Montgomery
- Running time: 47–50 minutes

Original release
- Network: NBC
- Release: January 30, 1950 – June 24, 1957

Robert Montgomery Presents is an American drama television series which was produced by NBC from January 30, 1950, until June 24, 1957. The live show had several sponsors during its eight-year run, and the title was altered to feature the sponsor, usually Lucky Strike cigarettes, for example, Robert Montgomery Presents Your Lucky Strike Theater, ....The Johnson's Wax Program, and so on.

== Evolution ==
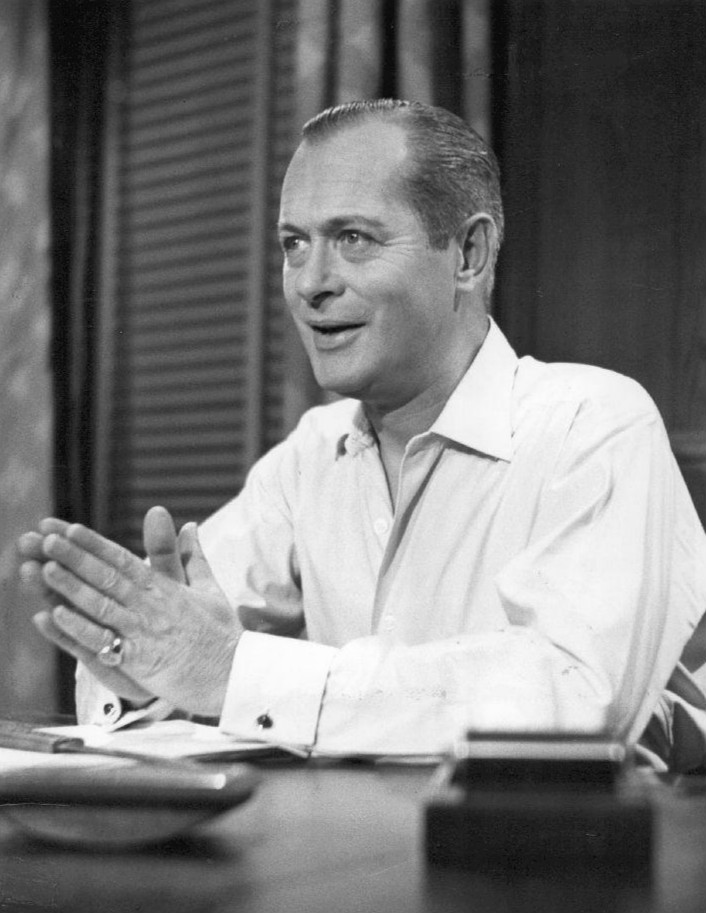
Robert Montgomery, producer and host of Robert Montgomery Presents

Initially offering hour-long dramas adapted from successful Hollywood films, the series was hosted and produced by Robert Montgomery. His presence lent a degree of respectability to the new medium of television, and he was able to persuade many of his Hollywood associates to appear. Montgomery introduced each episode and also acted in many episodes.

The program was noted for the high level of production values and the consistent attempt to present quality entertainment within the constraints of a live presentation. A drama built around the Hindenburg disaster, including interviews with survivors of the actual event, was one example of the ambitious nature of the program. In the 1950–51 season, the series finished #11 in the Nielsen ratings, followed by finishing #26 in 1951–52.

== Productions ==
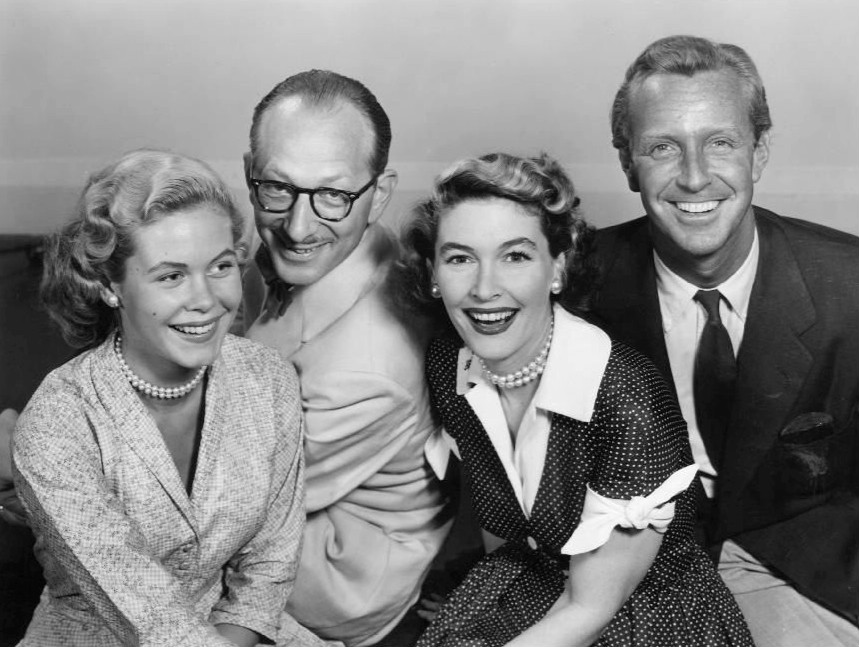
Ensemble cast of Robert Montgomery Presents (from left): Elizabeth Montgomery, Vaughn Taylor, Margaret Hayes and John Newland

The debut episode was W. Somerset Maugham's The Letter, starring Madeleine Carroll in her television debut. The broadcast raised concern with regard to how television rights to a story related to film rights to the same story. Warner Bros. produced the film The Letter (1940), and after the TV broadcast studio executives considered suing NBC and others connected with the program for copyright infringement.

During its first season, the movie adaptations included Rebecca, The Egg and I, Dark Victory and Montgomery's Ride the Pink Horse. Over the following seasons it adapted highly respected works but also showcased new writers and original dramas written expressly for the series. On Christmas Eve 1956, in a departure from its usual non-musical format, the series telecast Gian-Carlo Menotti's opera Amahl and the Night Visitors, which had already become an annual television event.

From 1952, a repertory cast appeared on the show along with guest artists (and featured during the series' Summer Theater seasons as well). Montgomery's daughter, Elizabeth Montgomery, made her acting debut as a repertory player in 1951 and remained with the show until 1956. Cliff Robertson also made his acting debut as part of the same group in 1954.

The announcer was Nelson Case.

On November 20, 1950, the program presented "The Canterville Ghost", starring Cecil Parker and Margaret O'Brien.

== Guest stars ==
Notable guest stars included:

- Luther Adler
- Brian Aherne
- Eddie Albert
- Robert Alda
- Mary Astor
- Jean-Pierre Aumont
- Jim Backus
- Fay Bainter
- Barbara Bel Geddes
- Constance Bennett
- Edna Best
- Claire Bloom
- Lee Bowman
- Ray Boyle
- Lloyd Bridges
- Sally Brophy
- Vanessa Brown
- James Cagney
- Madeleine Carroll
- Christopher Cary
- John Cassavetes
- Gage Clarke (as Gage Clark)
- Claudette Colbert
- Jackie Cooper
- Aneta Corsaut
- Kathleen Crowley
- Robert Culp
- Robert Cummings
- James Dean
- Gloria DeHaven
- Charles Drake
- Joanne Dru
- James Dunn
- June Duprez
- Bill Erwin
- Tom Ewell
- Peter Falk
- Mary Fickett
- Betty Field
- Geraldine Fitzgerald
- John Forsythe
- Peggy Ann Garner
- Dorothy Gish
- Lillian Gish
- Thomas Gomez
- Farley Granger
- Signe Hasso
- Hurd Hatfield
- June Havoc
- Helen Hayes
- Van Heflin
- Wanda Hendrix
- Charlton Heston
- Kim Hunter
- Diana Hyland
- Louis Jourdan
- Boris Karloff
- Grace Kelly
- Phyllis Kirk
- Elsa Lanchester
- Angela Lansbury
- Piper Laurie
- Anna Lee
- Jack Lemmon
- Audra Lindley
- June Lockhart
- Paul Lukas
- Diana Lynn
- Jeffrey Lynn
- Raymond Massey
- Osa Massen
- Carole Mathews
- Walter Matthau
- Roddy McDowall
- Darren McGavin
- Dorothy McGuire
- Burgess Meredith
- Jan Miner
- Elizabeth Montgomery
- Roger Moore
- Chester Morris
- John Newland
- Leslie Nielsen
- David Niven
- Margaret O'Brien
- Una O'Connor
- Gale Page
- Geraldine Page
- Vincent Price
- Ella Raines
- Lydia Reed
- Lee Remick
- Gena Rowlands
- Ann Rutherford
- Eva Marie Saint
- Reinhold Schünzel
- Martha Scott
- Zachary Scott
- Anne Seymour
- Jane Seymour
- Alexis Smith
- Kent Smith
- Lois Smith
- Brett Somers
- Jean Stapleton
- Inger Stevens
- Grant Sullivan
- E. W. Swackhamer (as E. L. Swackhammer)
- Joan Taylor
- Franchot Tone
- Natalie Trundy (as Natalie Trunde)
- Jo Van Fleet
- Mary K. Wells
- Estelle Winwood
- Joanne Woodward
- Teresa Wright
- Jane Wyatt
- Gig Young
- Frank Wilson

== Episodes ==
- April 20, 1953 - "World by the Tail" - Diana Lynn
- March 22, 1954 - "Pink Hippopotamus" - Oscar Homolka

== Awards and nominations ==
Year	Award	Result	Category
1952	Nominated	Emmy Award	Best Dramatic Show
1953	Won	Emmy Award	Best Dramatic Program
1954	Nominated	Emmy Award	Best Dramatic Show
