= So Big (1953 film) =

1953 film by Robert Wise

- Theatrical release poster
- Directed by: Robert Wise
- Screenplay by: John Twist
- Based on: So Big; 1924 novel by Edna Ferber
- Produced by: Henry Blanke
- Starring: Jane Wyman; Sterling Hayden; Nancy Olson
- Cinematography: Ellsworth Fredericks
- Edited by: Thomas Reilly
- Music by: Max Steiner
- Color process: Black and white
- Production company: Warner Bros. Pictures
- Distributed by: Warner Bros. Pictures
- Release date: October 31, 1953
- Running time: 102 minutes
- Country: United States
- Language: English
- Box office: $2 million (US)

So Big is a 1953 American Drama Western film directed by Robert Wise and starring Jane Wyman, Sterling Hayden and Nancy Olson.

The screenplay by John Twist was based on the 1924 novel by Edna Ferber. It was the third adaptation of the book, following a 1924 silent film with Colleen Moore and So Big! with Barbara Stanwyck, released in 1932.

== Plot ==
Sterling Hayden and Jane Wyman in So Big

In the late 1890s, boarding school student Selina Peake learns of the death of her father, who has left her penniless as the result of bad business transactions. August Hempel, the father of her best friend Julie, secures her a teaching position in New Holland, a small Dutch farming community outside Chicago. There she rents a room in the home of Klaas Pool, who lives with his unhappy wife Maartje and intelligent but troubled adolescent son Roelf.

After discovering the boy has an ear for music, Selina gives Roelf piano lessons and encourages his artistic talents, leading him away from juvenile delinquency. She meets Pervus DeJong and eventually accepts his proposal of marriage, settling into the daily routine of a farmer's wife. The two have a son they name Dirk, but as he grows older he is nicknamed So Big.

Dirk, like Roelf, exhibits signs of artistic abilities. His mother encourages him, despite her husband's disapproval. When the boy is eight years old, Pervus dies and Selina struggles to run the farm alone. She and Dirk travel to the Chicago Haymarket to sell their produce, but no one there will deal with a woman.

Facing financial difficulties, Selina reunites with Julie, now the divorced mother of two. Her father offers to invest in Selina's plan to grow exotic vegetables. Her asparagus is a huge success and she is able to send Dirk to college to study architecture. Following graduation, he finds employment as a draughtsman and continues his relationship with Julie's daughter Paula, a social climber who convinces him to forgo his career in favor of becoming a more immediate financial success. Dirk accepts a job in sales, disappointing his mother so much, she no longer calls him So Big.

Dirk falls in love with artist Dallas O'Mara and proposes marriage. Although she likes him, she declines his offer, telling him she wants a man whose hands have been roughened by physical labor. Roelf, now a famous composer, arrives in Chicago and reunites with Dallas, whom he had met in Paris. He, Dallas, and Dirk visit Selina, and the two women become friends.

Roelf and Dallas leave together, and Dirk bemoans the path his life has taken. His mother tells him it is not too late to pursue his creative dreams. Taking him in her arms, she calls him So Big once again.

== Cast ==
- Jane Wyman as Selina De Jong
- Sterling Hayden as Pervus De Jong
- Nancy Olson as Dallas O'Mara
- Steve Forrest as Dirk De Jong
- Elisabeth Fraser as Julie Hempel
- Martha Hyer as Paula Hempel
- Walter Coy as Roelf Pool
- Richard Beymer as Roelf, Age 12–16
- Tommy Rettig as Dirk, Age 8
- Jon Provost as Dirk - Age 2
- Roland Winters as Klaas Pool
- Jacques Aubuchon as August Hempel
- Ruth Swanson as Maartje Pool
- Dorothy Christy as Widow Paarlenberg
- Oliver Blake as Adam Ooms
- Lillian Kemble-Cooper as Miss Fister (as Lily Kemble Cooper).

== Marketing ==
Warner Bros. promoted So Big provocatively and scandalously in its advertising, even associating the title of the movie with Pervus's manhood through a picture of Sterling Hayden grasping Jane Wyman's shoulders as she looks up at him captioned "He stood there so big. Love had come, intense, unashamed. -- She was ready to forget she'd ever been a lady."

On October 31, 1953, Warner Bros. also put on a "carriage trade" premiere of So Big at the Hollywood Paramount Theatre. True to its name, at least 23 of the fanciest horse-drawn carriages on the West Coast transported the stars and actors to the theater along Hollywood Boulevard for publicity.

Warner Bros. also provided trade showings of So Big on Wednesday, September 30, 1953, around a month before it would be released. Some cities for the showings included Boston, Chicago, Des Moines, Detroit, Indianapolis, Kansas City, Milwaukee, Minneapolis, New Haven, Omaha, Philadelphia, Pittsburgh, St. Louis, and Washington.

== Critical reception ==
Bosley Crowther of The New York Times wrote

Despite the fact that the story is "dated," that it offers a very familiar theme and that the present production is loaded with some typical "Hollywood" flaws, there is still a great deal of solid substance in this latest retelling of the tale ...For the better part of the picture, we are largely indebted to Jane Wyman...remarkably strong and effective in every forthright little bit she does. From her earliest appearance...to her ultimate poignant scene...she is humble, restrained and sure...Where the picture falls down is in those phases in which the grown-up son goes to Chicago and gets himself infected with false notions of a successful career. Here John Twist's adaptation and Mr. Wise's direction are unsure, and the acting by all and sundry has a specious and artificial quality...As a consequence of its downward tangent toward the end, the whole picture loses force. The poignance of the mother's disappointment in her dearly loved son goes awry. Even so, the performance of Miss Wyman holds up right through to the end, and the character she sets throughout the first part stands firm amid the flow of glycerin tears.

Radio Times rated the film three out of five stars and commented "The tale's a mite old-fashioned for today's tastes, but under skilled editor-turned-director Robert Wise the Warner Bros gloss is not too intrusive, and there are nicely honed performances from big Sterling Hayden and lovely Nancy Olsen in support."

TV Guide rated the film three out of four stars and added "A good production, but a bit inflated, So Big commits the same error as the 1932 picture in that it stuffs a quarter of a century and many characters into not enough time."

The General Federation of Women's Clubs (GFWC) had a special preview in Washington of the highly influential group in 1953, and it was a big hit with the toppers. According to Mrs. Dean Gray Edwards, chairman of the m.p. division of the Federation, they were "enchanted with the splendid filming of the Edna Ferber novel. Several said they had never seen a finer picture and that this is the type of picture greatly needed today." The millions of women who create the Federation will receive that message, and the Independent Exhibitors Film Bulletin claims that will assure a pre-sold audience. They also recommend a similar preview for all feminist types of movies to women's groups.

On October 3, 1953, Harrison's Reports wrote "Despite its length, this remake of Edna Ferber's prize-winning novel is only a fair drama...The trouble with this third version is that it lacks unity of plot -- it wanders all over the lot, and is packed with details which, for the most part, are tiresome. Another drawback is the fact that the spectator feels sympathy for the boy characters in the first half of the picture, but finds it difficult to transfer his affections to them in the second half, where they are shown as grown men. Still another weakness is the fact that the farm background in the first half of the picture is drab and dreary. No fault can be found with Jane Wyman's acting: she can always be depended on to do her part right. There is some human interest here and there, and some mild comedy, but with a better script the picture might have been a powerful drama. The black-and-white photography is fair:--

On October 5, 1953, Independent Exhibitors Film Bulletin rated So Big as good, with three dollar signs out of four, four being "tops." The review headlines with "New version of Edna Ferber novel filmization well-fashioned tear-jerker. Wyman performance ranks with her "Johnny Belinda" role. Strong fem appeal. Fine family attraction. Will build on word-of-mouth." The review states "Success of previous two (1925, 1932) versions of Ferber novel, plus Jane Wyman name and formidable word-of-mouth makes "So Big" good b.o. bet, except, perhaps, in action houses. Wyman's superb performance, matches Blue Veil and Johnny Belinda portrayals, makes bid for Oscar nomination...Roles are excellently portrayed, interest held throughout, no mean feat in episodic tale of this sort, Plenty of sure-fire angles and incidents to wet eyes, and bring a warm glow. Family spots will thrive on it."

== Release ==
There is no record that a VHS version of the film has been released; So Big was released on VHS then the copies mysteriously disappeared. In 2019, the film was released in Australia on Region-free DVD.

== Awards and nominations ==
Steve Forrest was awarded the Golden Globe Award for New Star of the Year – Actor with Hugh O'Brian and Richard Egan.

== Adaptations to other media ==
So Big was adapted as an hour-long radio play on Studio One's December 29, 1947 broadcast with Joan Blondell, and on Lux Radio Theatre's September 21, 1954 broadcast with Ida Lupino and Robert Stack.
