= So Big (novel) =

1924 novel by Edna Ferber

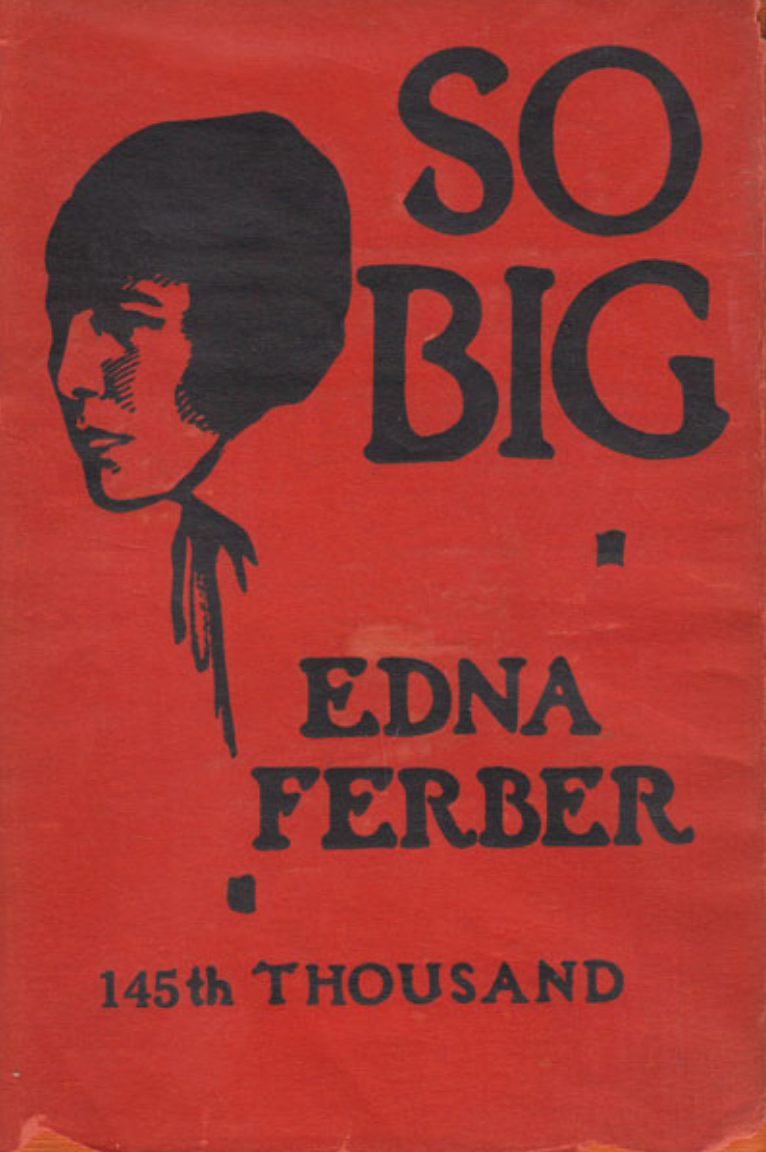
- First edition (publ. Doubleday, Page)
- Author: Edna Ferber
- Language: English
- Publication date: 1924

So Big is a 1924 novel written by Edna Ferber. The book was inspired by the life of Antje Paarlberg in the Dutch community of South Holland, Illinois, a Chicago suburb. It was a best-seller in the United States and won the Pulitzer Prize for the Novel in 1925.

== Plot summary ==
The story follows the life of a young woman, Selina Peake De Jong, who decides to be a school teacher in farming country. During her stay on the Pool family farm, she encourages the young Roelf Pool to follow his interests, which include art. Upon his mother's death, Roelf runs away to France. Meanwhile, Selina marries a Dutch farmer named Pervus. They have a child together, Dirk, whom she nicknames "So Big," from the common question and answer "How big is baby? " "So-o-o-o big!" (Ferber, 2). Pervus becomes ill and dies, and Selina is forced to take over working on the farm to give Dirk a future. As Dirk gets older, he works as an architect but is more interested in making money than creating buildings and becomes a stock broker, much to his mother's disappointment. His love interest, Dallas O'Mara, an acclaimed artist, echoes this sentiment by trying to convince Dirk that there is more to life than money. Much later in life, Selina is visited by Roelf Pool, who has since become a famous sculptor. Dirk grows very distressed when, after visiting his mother's farm, he realizes that Dallas and Roelf love each other and he cannot compete with the artistically minded sculptor. In the end, Dirk comes to appreciate the wisdom of his mother, who always valued aesthetics and beauty even as she scraped out a living in a stern Dutch community. Ultimately, Dirk is left alone in his sumptuous apartment, saddened by his abandonment of artistic values.

== Publication ==
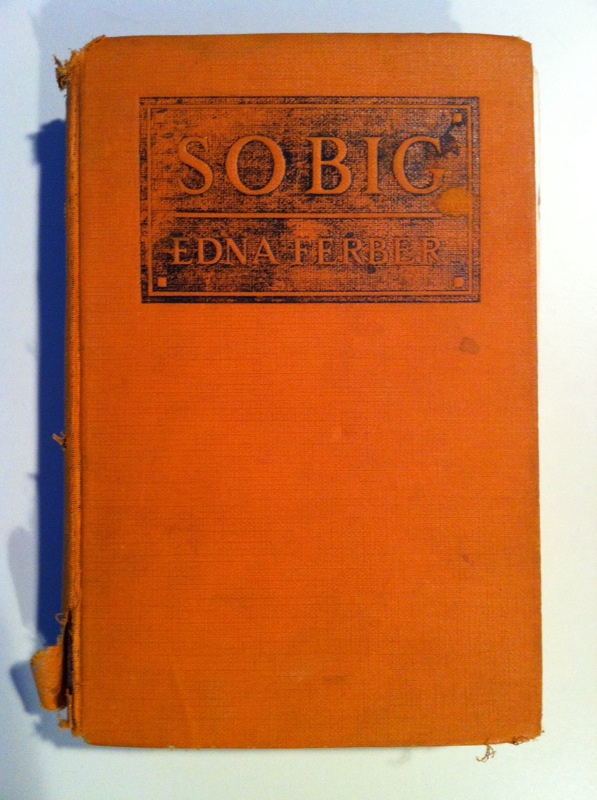
First edition (publ. Grosset & Dunlap, 1924).

Edna Ferber was not confident about So Big. On page 32 of J. E. Smyth's biography of Ferber called Edna Ferber’s Hollywood: American Fictions of Gender, Race, and History, Ferber states, “I wrote it against my judgment; I wanted to write it...Nothing ever really happened in the book. It had no plot at all, as book plots go. It had a theme, but you had to read that for yourself between the lines.” She argued if anything, “it was a story of the triumph of failure.”

She sent the book off to her publisher Doubleday apologizing, saying to Russell Doubleday, “I think its publication as a book would hurt you, as publishers, and me as an author.” Additionally, she later wrote, “Who would be interested in a novel about a middle-aged woman in a calico dress with wispy hair and bad teeth, grubbing on a little truck farm south of Chicago?”

To Ferber's surprise, Doubleday loved the novel. It was a commercial success, sold hundreds of thousands of copies in its first year of publication, and became the best-selling work of fiction in America for the year 1924, according to Publishers Weekly.

== Film, television or theatrical adaptations ==
A number of film adaptations of the novel have been made. The first adaptation, directed by Charles Brabin, was released the same year the novel was published, with Colleen Moore in her first significant dramatic role. The 1932 adaptation, directed by William A. Wellman, featured an ensemble cast led by Barbara Stanwyck, George Brent and Bette Davis. The most recent adaptation, directed by Robert Wise in 1953, starred Jane Wyman and Sterling Hayden. This one softened the ending considerably by including a reconciliation between Dirk and his mother.

A satirical version of the novel appears in Bob Clampett's 1946 cartoon Book Revue. A fugitive wolf is running away from the authorities and runs past the book, which features Jimmy Durante on the cover. Durante sticks his famously large nose out and trips the wolf.

== Radio adaptations ==
So Big was presented on Lux Radio Theater on March 13, 1939, with Stanwyck reprising her role from the film. It was presented again on Stories America Loves in 1942. Joan Blaine had the role of Selina Peake in that adaptation.
