= The Story of Mary Marlin =

American soap opera radio program

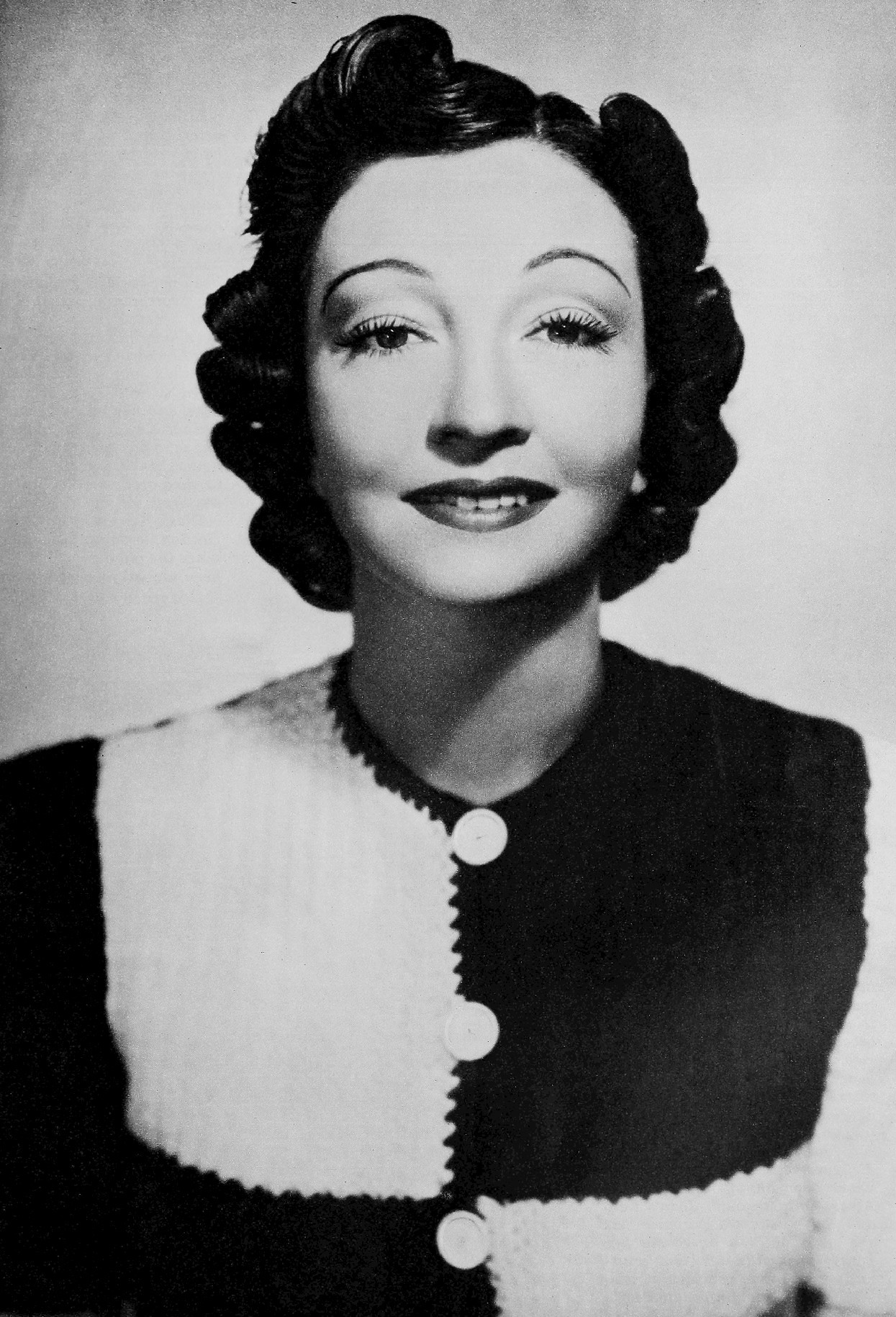
- Joan Blaine, the first actress to portray Mary Marlin
- Genre: Soap opera
- Country of origin: United States
- Language: English
- Home station: WMAQ
- Syndicates: NBC; CBS; ABC
- Starring: Joan Blaine; Anne Seymour; Betty Lou Gerson; Muriel Kirkland; Eloise Kummer; Linda Carlon
- Announcer: Truman Bradley; Nelson Case; Tip Corning; John Tillman
- Created by: Jane Crusinberry
- Written by: Jane Crusinberry
- Directed by: Don Cope; Kirby Hawkes; Gordon Hughes; Basil Loughrane; Ed Rice; Maury Lowell
- Original release: October 3, 1934 – April 11, 1952
- Opening theme: "Clair de Lune"
- Sponsored by: Kleenex; Ivory Soap; Tenderleaf Tea

The Story of Mary Marlin is an American soap opera radio program. It was broadcast from October 3, 1934, until April 12, 1945, and returned from September 24, 1951, until April 11, 1952. After 1937 it was among the highest-rated soap operas. A version was also broadcast in Australia in 1959-1960.

== Premise ==
The title character began the series as a forgiving wife after her husband had an affair with a secretary in the law firm in which he was a partner. The couple lived in Cedar Springs, Iowa, until he won a seat in the United States Senate and they moved to Washington, D. C., with their newborn son, Davey. Joe again became involved in an affair, this time with the wife of a powerful politician. A trip to Russia took Joe away from the affair and set the stage for the ongoing story of the serial's future.

Unbeknownst to his wife, Joe survived a plane crash on an Asian mountain, beginning what radio historian John Dunning described as "the father of all amnesia cases". As he searched for his identity, his wife hired a detective to search for him. Meanwhile, Iowa's governor appointed Mary to replace Joe in the Senate. Episodes of her adapting to her new position were intermingled with those about Joe's adventures "facing storm-tossed seas and rubbing elbows with gurus and generalissimos".

== Personnel ==
Joan Blaine initially portrayed the title character. She was succeeded in that role by Anne Seymour, Betty Lou Gerson, Muriel Kirkland, Eloise Kummer, and Linda Carlon. Other characters and the actors who played then are shown in the table below.

Partial List of Characters in The Story of Mary Marlin and the Actors Who Portrayed Them
| Character | Actor(s) |
|---|---|
| Joe Marlin | Robert Griffin |
| David Post | Carlton Brickert, Arthur Jacobson |
| Oswald Ching | Peter Donald, Bob Jellison |
| Frazier Mitchell | Phil Lord, Fred Sullivan |
| Bunny Mitchell | Fran Carlon, Templeton Fox |
| Tootie | Rosemary Garbell |
| Rufus Kane | Rupert LaBelle |
| Eve Underwood | June Meredith |
| Henrietta Dorn | Betty Lou Gerson |
| Michael Dorn | Harvey Hays, Francis X. Bushman |
| Never-Fail Hendricks | Frank Dane, William Lee |
| Davey Marlin | Jerry Spellman, Dolores Gillen, Bobby Dean Maxwell |
| Timothy Kent | Frankie Pacelli |
| Giles | Arnold Moss |
| Cynthia Adams | Loretta Poynton |
| Sally Gibbons | Elinor Harriot |
| Henry Matthews | Raymond Edward Johnson |
| Frances Matthews | Bess Johnson |
| Arnold | Arthur Kohl, Robert White |
| Sara Jane Kane | Helen Behmiller, Charme Allen |
| Dennis McKenzie | Eddie Firestone Jr., Bill Lipton |
| Arthur Adams | DeWitt McBride, Bob Fiske |
| Marge Adams | Constance Crowder, Isabel Randolph |
| Peter Fortune | Jesse Pugh |
| Annie | Judith Lowry |
| Doc Sharpe | Murray Forbes |
| Daniel P. Burke | Gene Morgan |

Truman Bradley, Nelson Case, Tip Corning, Les Griffith, and John Tillman were announcers. Jane Crusinberry created the series and wrote its scripts. Directors were Don Cope, Kirby Hawkes, Gordon Hughes, Basil Loughrane, Ed Rice, and Maury Lowell.

Pianists Harvey Harding, Allen Grant and Joe Kahn played the theme, "Clair de Lune".

== Schedule ==
The Story of Mary Marlin debuted on WMAQ radio in Chicago on October 3, 1934, and it remained a local program through December 28, 1934. On January 1, 1935, it became a network program. The list below outlines changes in network, sponsor, and time over the years (all times Eastern).

- 1935: Kleenex on NBC at noon.
- April 2, 1935-1936: Kleenex on CBS at noon.
- 1937-1941: Ivory Soap on NBC Blue in late morning and on NBC Red in mid-afternoon.
- 1941-1942: Procter & Gamble on NBC at 11 a.m. and on CBS at 5 p.m.
- 1942-1943: Procter & Gamble on NBC at 3 p.m.
- 1943-1945: Tenderleaf Tea on CBS at 3 p.m.

Source: On the Air: The Encyclopedia of Old-Time Radio except as noted.

ABC brought the program back on a sustaining basis from September 24, 1951, until April 11, 1952, at 3:15 on weekdays. A version of the program was also broadcast in Australia in 1959-1960.

== Impact ==
In its September 11, 1944, issue, Life magazine reported that Mary Marlin had "occupied a substantial place in American households for more than nine years. By now its listeners have come to learn that no matter how big and numerous their worries may seem, Mary's are bigger and more numerous." The article was accompanied by photographs of re-enactments of some of the program's major situations up to that point. "Mary Marlin," the article said, "is based on the assumption that the American woman likes to be reminded that it is always darkest before the dawn."

For some listeners, Marlin became more than a character on a radio program. Bruce Lenthall related one example in his book, Radio's America: The Great Depression and the Rise of Modern Mass Culture. In 1938, Grace Squires, who was visiting her daughter in Washington, D. C., asked to be taken to Alexandria, Virginia, "so I can see where Mary Marlin lives". The daughter reminded her that Marlin was a fictional character. To Squires and many other listeners, however, Marlin became a bridge between their private lives and the larger world. They invited Marlin into their homes via radio and, in turn, she enabled them "to enter into a new community".

Lenthall wrote that "a sizable minority of the fans of The Story of Mary Marlin who wrote to Mary Marlin accepted that program as real", such as one who wrote asking for a job as governess for one of the characters. More often, he added, fans accepted the program's fictional status, "but believed in it to some degree anyway". An example of the latter group was a man whose letter to the program complained about a different actress portraying Marlin but also recommended a doctor whom the writer felt could cure a character's blindness.

== Behind-the-scenes conflicts ==
Marlin dealt with problems that few female characters on soap operas of her era encountered. Michele Hilmes, in her book, Only Connect: A Cultural History of Broadcasting in the United States, noted that Marlin's political role meant that the character had to deal with "real social and political issues". Prior to World War II, Crusinberry faced severe censorship from network and advertising agency officials as she tried to include political issues into the program. Restrictions on her writing were relaxed—if not removed—during the early years of the war, and the program's ratings reached a peak in 1943.

In 1944, Procter & Gamble ended its sponsorship "due to discomfort with the show's increasingly political tone and Crusinberry's increasingly hostile resistance to the changes her producers wanted her to make". The new sponsor, Standard Brands (promoting Tenderleaf Tea), brought in pioneering soap opera creator Irna Phillips as a consultant, and Phillips recommended toning down Marlin's activities to make her less political and more like the women who listened. By the end of 1944, Crusinberry had been fired from the soap opera that she had created. Marlin's on-air situation changed when the plot had her facing possible loss of custody of her son if she continued in politics. The program's ratings declined sharply, and cancellation followed in 1945.

== Listener response ==
=== Unsolicited letters ===
In the early years, at least, of Mary Marlin, letters from listeners sometimes influenced the course of the show's story. The sponsor's employees read unsolicited letters and created a log that included a brief summary of each letter's contents. The logs were sent to Crusinberry for her consideration with regard to developments in the story line. Samples from one page of a log from late September 1935 included the following comments:

- "Mary should marry Peter."
- "Mary becoming affected -- laughs too much. Don't know whether Sally or Mary heroine. Hope Joe and Mary are united."
- "Leave music out -- blots out some words."

In addition to suggestions about the story, some listeners requested changes in the time of broadcast or the station, and some asked for copies of songs or poems that were used on the show. Elena Razlogova, in her book, The Listener's Voice: Early Radio and the American Public, commented, "Most authors addressed their letters directly to Mary Marlin or other characters on the show, rather than writing to the sponsor or writer, thus betraying a strong personal connection to these fictional people."

From 1925 to 1944, letters from listeners helped Cruisberry "take control over daily production decisions" of Mary Marlin.

=== Advertising and promotion ===
Three promotions in 1935 and 1936 indicated the size of Mary Marlin's audience.

When a free packet of Kleenex tissues was offered to listeners who wrote to NBC's Chicago affiliate in 1935 to support the show's continuation, 67,300 responses arrived — the largest response any radio station had ever had to a promotion. A 1936 promotion offered prizes totaling $10,000 for suggestions in two areas: names for Marlin's baby and ways to use Kleenex with babies. A total of 168,207 responses arrived at NBC, and Kleenex sales increased 13 percent.

Also in 1935, Klennex's manufacturer, International Cellucotton Products Company (ICPC), launched a new deodorant, Quest, that was advertised only on Mary Marlin. Within months after Quest debuted, "a consumer survey showed that the product had captured first place in the powder deodorant field".

Such results did not last, however. In 1937, the advertising agency representing ICPC decided that Mary Marlin "had reached its saturation point". The sponsorship ended, and advertising for Kleenex returned to print media.

== Documentation ==
The Jane Crusinberry Papers at the Wisconsin Historical Society contain documents related to The Story of Mary Marlin, including a full set of scripts from the 1934-1945 broadcasts and a 1959-1960 version in Australia. It also has "character sketches, show music, outlines, publicity, commercials, reference material, scenarios, story summaries, and synopses" and other content about the show.
