= Kate McComb =

American actress

- Born: Kate Norton Scudder; 1871; Sacramento, California, U.S.
- Died: 1959 (aged 87–88); New York, New York, U.S.
- Burial place: Mahaiwe Cemetery, Great Barrington, Berkshire County, Massachusetts, U.S.
- Other names: Kate Walker; Kate Walker McComb
- Occupation(s): Radio and stage actress
- Spouse: John Rector McComb
- Children: 1

Kate Norton McComb (née Scudder, formerly Walker; 1871–1959) was an American radio and stage actress who performed on Broadway. She also played the piano and sang. Originally not wanting to act professionally, McComb began her professional career at age 52. The Kate McComb Playhouse in Great Barrington, Massachusetts, was dedicated in her honor.

== Biography ==
McComb was born in Sacramento, California in 1871. As a child, she attended boarding school and played the piano, until she contracted pneumonia at age 17. Due to her pneumonia, her doctor advised that she not become a concert pianist and should sing instead.

She later married John Rector McComb (1862–1920), and when he contracted cerebral meningitis, they relocated from New York City to Great Barrington, Massachusetts, in hopes that it would help him recover. In her amateur career, McComb organized a dramatic production in June 1914 for the local Visiting Nurse Association. In May 1916, she performed in Petticoat Perfidy in Albany, New York. McComb was a soloist at Great Barrington's Episcopal Church and the choir director at its Congregational Church in 1918.

In 1923, McComb sang and played piano on WJZ radio in New York City. At age 52, after her husband and mother had died and her son had moved away to attend college, she decided to pursue a professional career as a stage actress. She debuted in a stock production of St. Elmo's Fire, and appeared on Broadway in Juno and the Paycock. She played a small part in Silver Flute and appeared with Parker Fennelly in the NBC radio show Snow Village Sketches from 1928 to 1930.

She was in the radio sketch comedy A House Divided. Back on Broadway, she performed in Blood Money, Magnolia, Riddle Me This, and No Questions Asked. Her other roles included the radio serial The Rise of the Goldbergs, the play Harvey, Mrs. O'Neill in the 1930s soap opera The O'Neills, Maggie in the 1944 radio serial The Strange Romance of Evelyn Winters, and Dr. Brent's mother in Road of Life. Although The O'Neills was on the radio for almost 10 years, only one episode from 1938 still exists.

Kate McComb died in 1959.

== Legacy ==
On October 13, 1959, the Kate McComb Playhouse opened in Great Barrington, Massachusetts, with a performance of The Wizard of Oz. The theater was established by Mr. and Mrs. Malcolm McComb in honor of his mother.
