= The O'Neills =

US television program

The O'Neills is a radio and TV serial drama. The radio iteration of the show aired on Mutual, CBS and NBC from 1934 to 1943. Created by actress-writer Jane West, the series was sponsored at various times by Gold Dust, Ivory Snow, and Standard Brands. It was telecast on the DuMont Television Network in 1949 and 1950.

== Characters and story ==
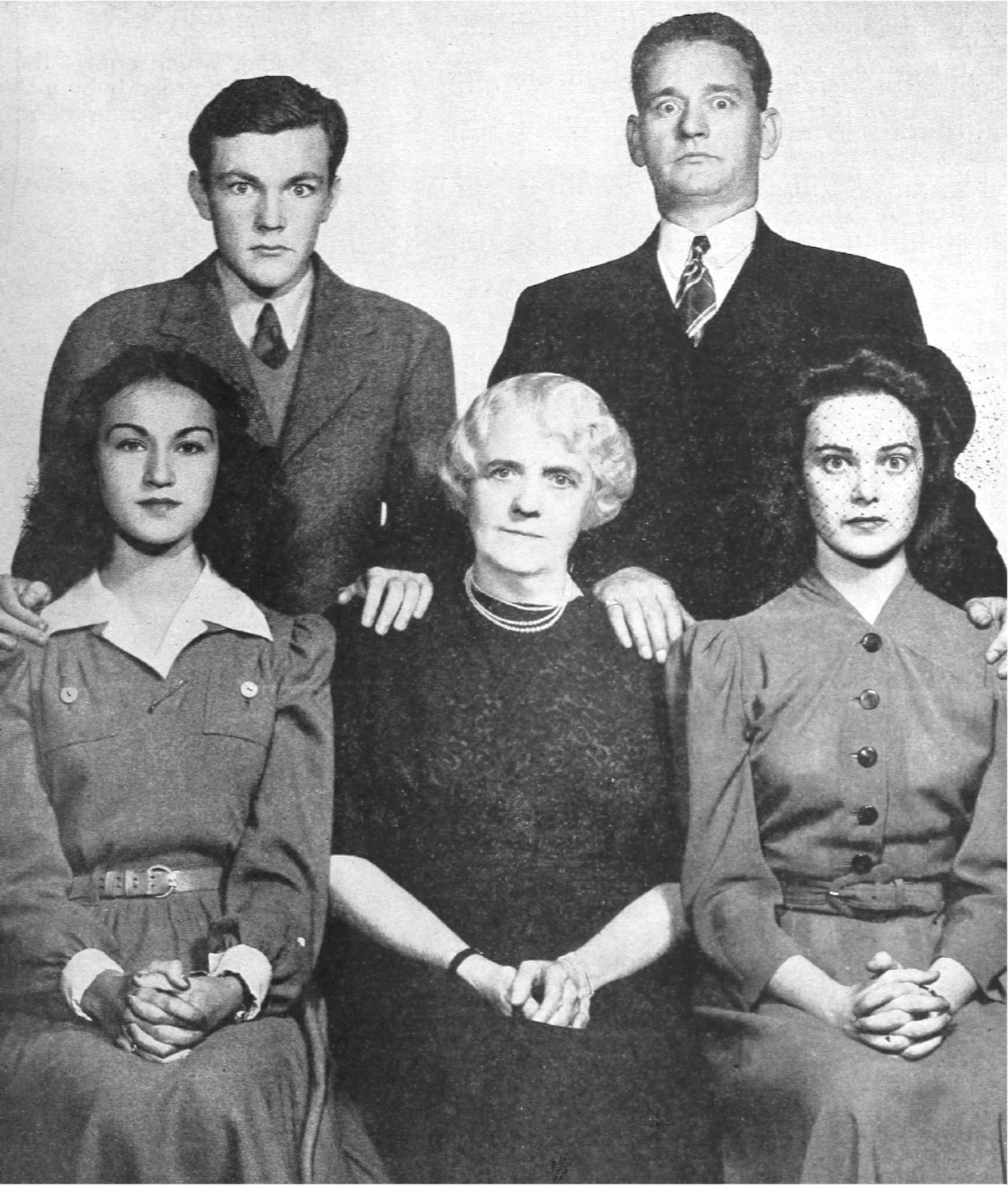
The O'Neills in January 1941 Seated from left: Janice Gilbert (Janice), Kate McComb (Mother O'Neill), Claire Neisen (Peggy). Standing from left: Jimmy Donnelly (Eddie) and James Tansey (Danny)

In the midwestern town of Royalton, the widowed Mother O'Neill (Kate McComb) raises her children, Danny (Jimmy Tansey) and Peggy (Joan Banks) Living upstairs in the O'Neill's two-family house was Mother O'Neill's friend, the meddling Trudy Bailey (Jane West). After their father's death, teenager Janice Collins (Janice Gilbert) and her brother Eddie Collins (Jimmy Donnelly) move into the O'Neill house. Helen Shields played Eileen Turner. In 1941, Claudia Morgan joined the cast in the role of Laura Penway.

Organist William Meeder supplied the music. The announcers were Ed Herlihy and Howard Petrie.

== Television ==
The O'Neills
- Starring: Janice Gilbert; Vera Allen; Michael Lawson; Ian Martin; Celia Budkin; Benjamin Fishbein
- Theme music composer: William Meeder
- Country of origin: United States
- Original language: English

Production
- Running time: 30 minutes

Original release
- Network: DuMont
- Release: September 6, 1949 – January 10, 1950

Writer-creator Jane West reprised her radio role as the busybody Mrs. Bailey. Radio cast member Janice Gilbert also returned for the series, again playing Janice O'Neill. The show was telecast on DuMont Tuesdays at 9pm ET from September 6, 1949, until January 10, 1950.

== Films ==
In December 1936, plans were announced for a series of three films based on The O'Neills, the first of which was to be The Trial of Danny O'Neill. West was to collaborate on the script.

== Bibliography ==
- David Weinstein, The Forgotten Network: DuMont and the Birth of American Television (Philadelphia: Temple University Press, 2004) ISBN 1-59213-245-6
- Alex McNeil, Total Television, Fourth edition (New York: Penguin Books, 1980) ISBN 0-14-024916-8
- Tim Brooks and Earle Marsh, The Complete Directory to Prime Time Network and Cable TV Shows 1946–Present, Ninth edition (New York: Ballantine Books, 2007) ISBN 978-0-345-49773-4

== See also ==
- List of programs broadcast by the DuMont Television Network
- List of surviving DuMont Television Network broadcasts
- 1949-50 United States network television schedule
