= So Big (1924 film) =

1924 film by Charles Brabin

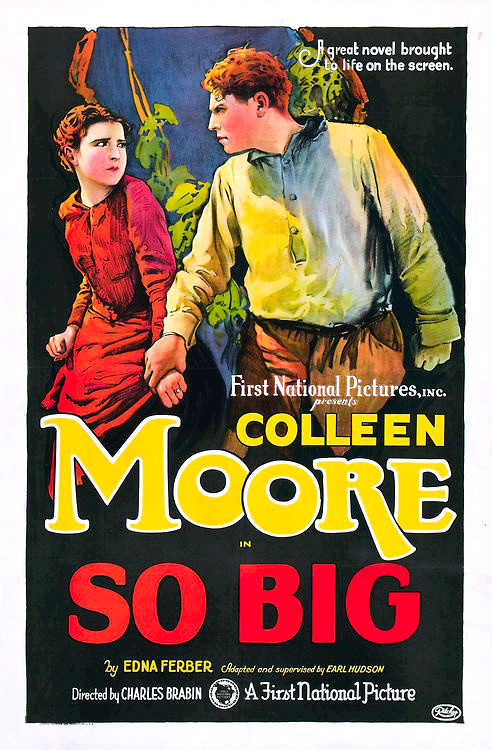
- Film poster
- Directed by: Charles Brabin
- Written by: Adelaide Heilbron (scenario); Earl Hudson (adaptation)
- Based on: So Big; 1924 novel by Edna Ferber
- Produced by: Earl Hudson
- Starring: Colleen Moore
- Cinematography: Ted D. McCord
- Edited by: Arthur Tavares; Marion Fairfax (edit. director)
- Distributed by: Associated First National
- Release date: December 28, 1924 (USA)
- Running time: 9 reels
- Country: United States
- Language: Silent (English intertitles)

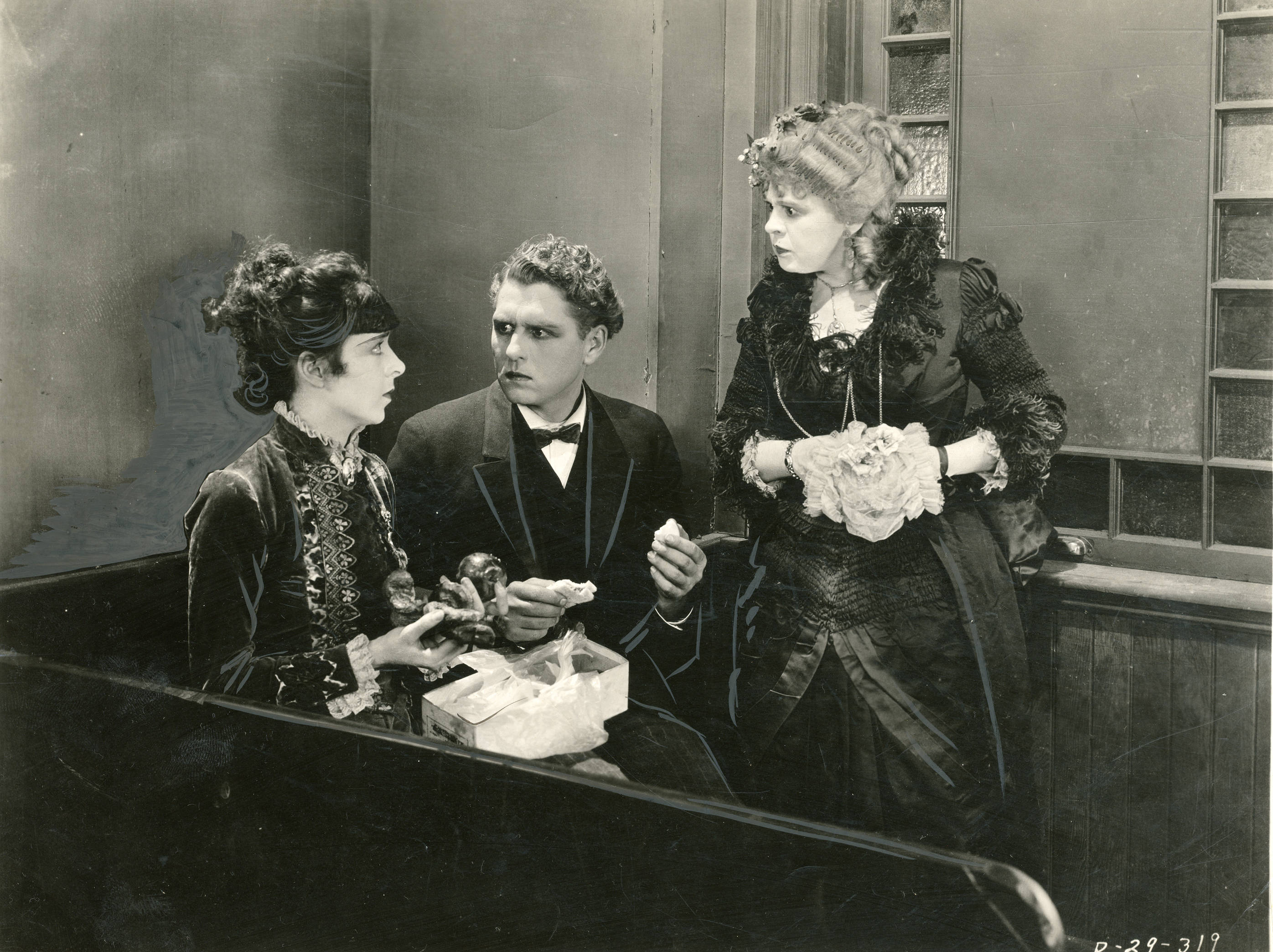
So Big, film still

So Big is a 1924 American silent film based on Edna Ferber's 1924 novel of the same name which won the Pulitzer Prize for the Novel in 1925. The film featured a breakout role for its star Colleen Moore, who had previously specialized in flapper roles. It was produced by independent producer Earl Hudson the film and distributed through Associated First National.

== Plot ==
As described in a review in a film magazine, Selina Peake (Moore) is the daughter of Simeon Peake, a wealthy American businessman. In 1888, she graduates from a finishing school and tours Europe with her father.

One day Selina learns that her father has died in a gambling den, leaving her with no money. She takes a job as a school teacher at High Prairie in Illinois and marries Pervus DeJong (Bowers), a simple, poor farmer. Selina's sole consolation is her son Dirk (Lyon), whom she calls "So Big." When Pervus dies, Selina is forced to peddles vegetables to survive. The father of a former school friend advances her a little money.

Eighteen years later, Selina has made the farm profitable. Dirk is educated as an architect and wins a big competition. However, he owes much of his success to Paula Storm (Theby), the wife of William Storm (Herbert). Dirk is loved by Dallas O'Meara (Haver), an artist.

Paula persuades Dirk to elope with her. When Selina learns about this plan, she begs them to reconsider. After learning of his wife's intentions, William threatens to name Dirk in a divorce lawsuit and destroy his reputation. Selina persuades William to drop the lawsuit. A chastened Dirk goes with Selina to see Dallas.

== Cast ==
- Colleen Moore as Selina Peake
- Joseph De Grasse as Simeon Peake
- John Bowers as Pervus DeJong
- Ben Lyon as Dirk DeJong
- Wallace Beery as Klaus Poole
- Gladys Brockwell as Maartje Poole
- Jean Hersholt as Aug Hempel
- Charlotte Merriam as Julie Hempel
- Dot Farley as Widow Paarleburg
- Ford Sterling as Jacob Hoogenduck
- Frankie Darro as Dirk DeJong (as a child)
- Henry Hebert as William Storm (credited as Henry Herbert)
- Dorothy Brock as Dirk DeJong (as an infant)
- Rosemary Theby as Paula Storm
- Phyllis Haver as Dallas O'Meara

== Preservation ==
So Big is currently presumed lost. In February of 2021, the film was cited by the National Film Preservation Board on their Lost U.S. Silent Feature Films list.

== See also ==
- List of lost films
